= Michele Bredenkamp =

U.S. Army general

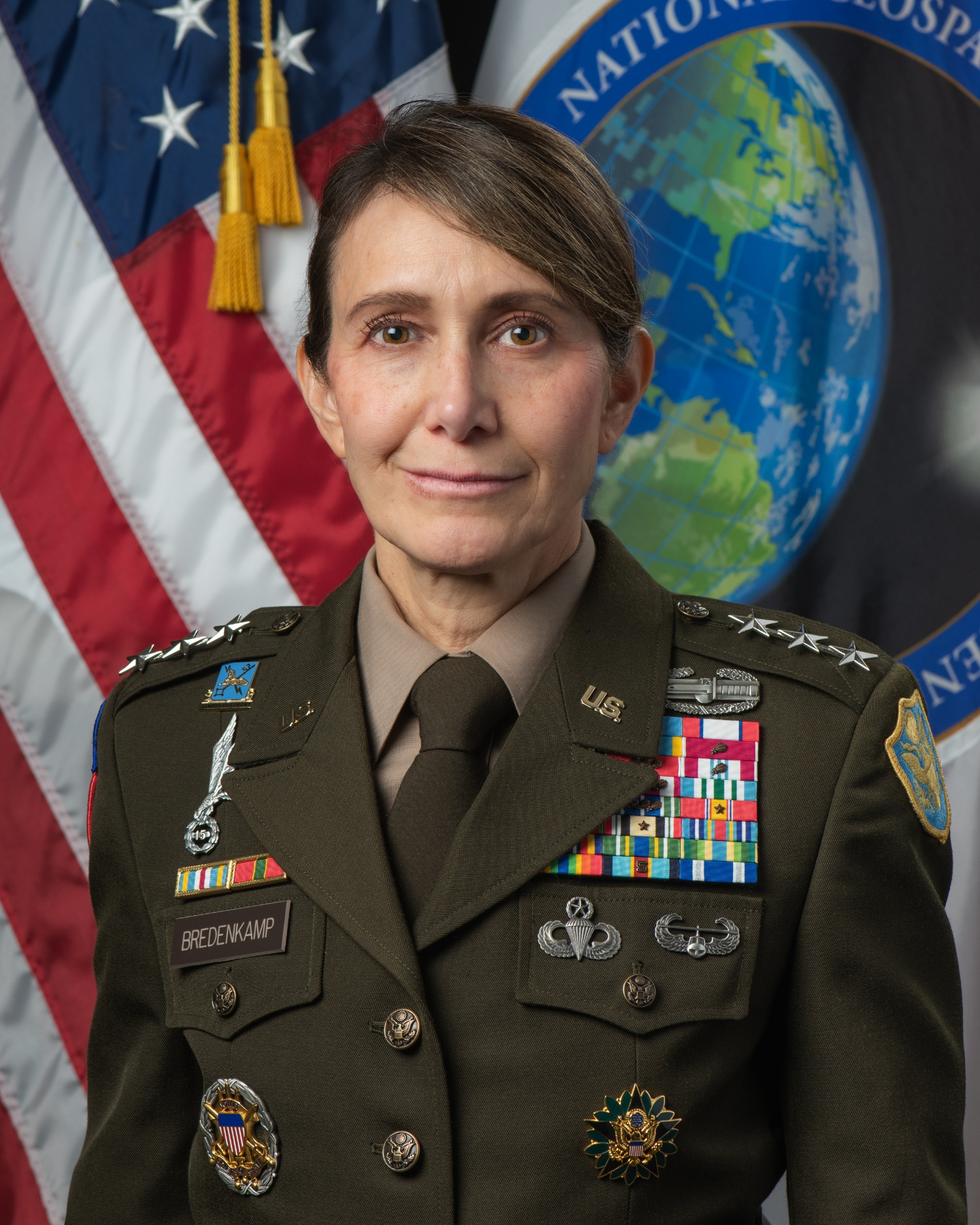
- Official portrait, 2025
- Spouse: Trevor J. Bredenkamp
- Military career
- Allegiance: United States
- Branch: United States Army
- Service years: 1990–present
- Rank: Lieutenant General
- Commands: National Geospatial-Intelligence Agency; United States Army Intelligence and Security Command; 704th Military Intelligence Brigade; Targeting Squadron, Joint Special Operations Command; 524th Military Intelligence Battalion
- Awards: Defense Distinguished Service Medal; Defense Superior Service Medal; Legion of Merit (2)

Michele Herman Bredenkamp is a United States Army lieutenant general who has served as director's advisor for military affairs to the director of national intelligence since January 2024. She most recently served as the Commanding General of the United States Army Intelligence and Security Command from 2021 to 2023. She previously served as the director of intelligence of the United States Forces Korea and deputy director of intelligence of the Combined Forces Command.

On November 5 2025, she took command as the ninth director of the National Geospatial-Intelligence Agency (NGA).

Military offices
Preceded by ???	Deputy Director for Program Analysis and Evaluation of the United States Army; 2018	Succeeded by Karl Gingrich
Preceded by Charles H. Cleveland	Vice Director for Intelligence of the Joint Staff; 2018–2020	Succeeded by Michael L. Downs
Preceded by Michael L. Downs	Director of Intelligence of the United States Forces Korea and Deputy Director of Intelligence of the Combined Forces Command; 2020–2021	Succeeded by Richard T. Appelhans
Preceded by Gary W. Johnston	Commanding General of the United States Army Intelligence and Security Command; 2021–2023	Succeeded by Timothy D. Brown
Preceded by Jeffrey A. Kruse	Advisor for Military Affairs to the Director of National Intelligence; 2024–2025	Succeeded by Melvin G. Carter
Preceded by Frank D. Whitworth	Director of the National Geospatial-Intelligence Agency; 2025–present	Incumbent
