= Erik C. Peterson (general) =

U.S. Army general

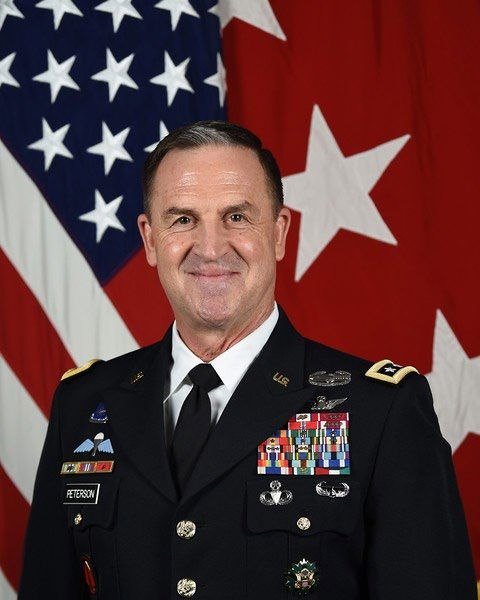
- Military career
- Allegiance: United States
- Branch: United States Army
- Service years: 1986–2024
- Rank: Lieutenant General
- Commands: First Army Division West; United States Army Special Operations Aviation Command
- Erik C. Peterson's voice Peterson's opening statement at a House Armed Services Tactical Air and Land Forces Subcommittee hearing on FY2024 Army modernization programs Recorded April 26, 2023

Erik C. Peterson is a retired United States Army lieutenant general who last served as the deputy chief of staff for programs of the United States Army from 2021 to 2024. Previously, he was director of force development of the same directorate, and prior to that was the Commanding General of First Army Division West.

Military offices
Preceded by Clayton M. Hutmacher	Commanding General of the United States Army Special Operations Aviation Command; 2014–2016	Succeeded by John R. Evans Jr.
Preceded by ???	Director of Army Aviation of the United States Army; 2016–2017	Succeeded by Frank W. Tate
Preceded by Jeffrey Colt	Commanding General of the First Army Division West; 2017–2019	Succeeded by Frank W. Tate
Preceded by John C. Ulrich	Director of Force Development of the United States Army; 2019–2021	Succeeded by Michael C. McCurry II
Preceded by James Pasquarette	Deputy Chief of Staff for Programs of the United States Army; 2021–2024	Succeeded by Karl Gingrich
