= Dan Caine =

American general (born 1968)

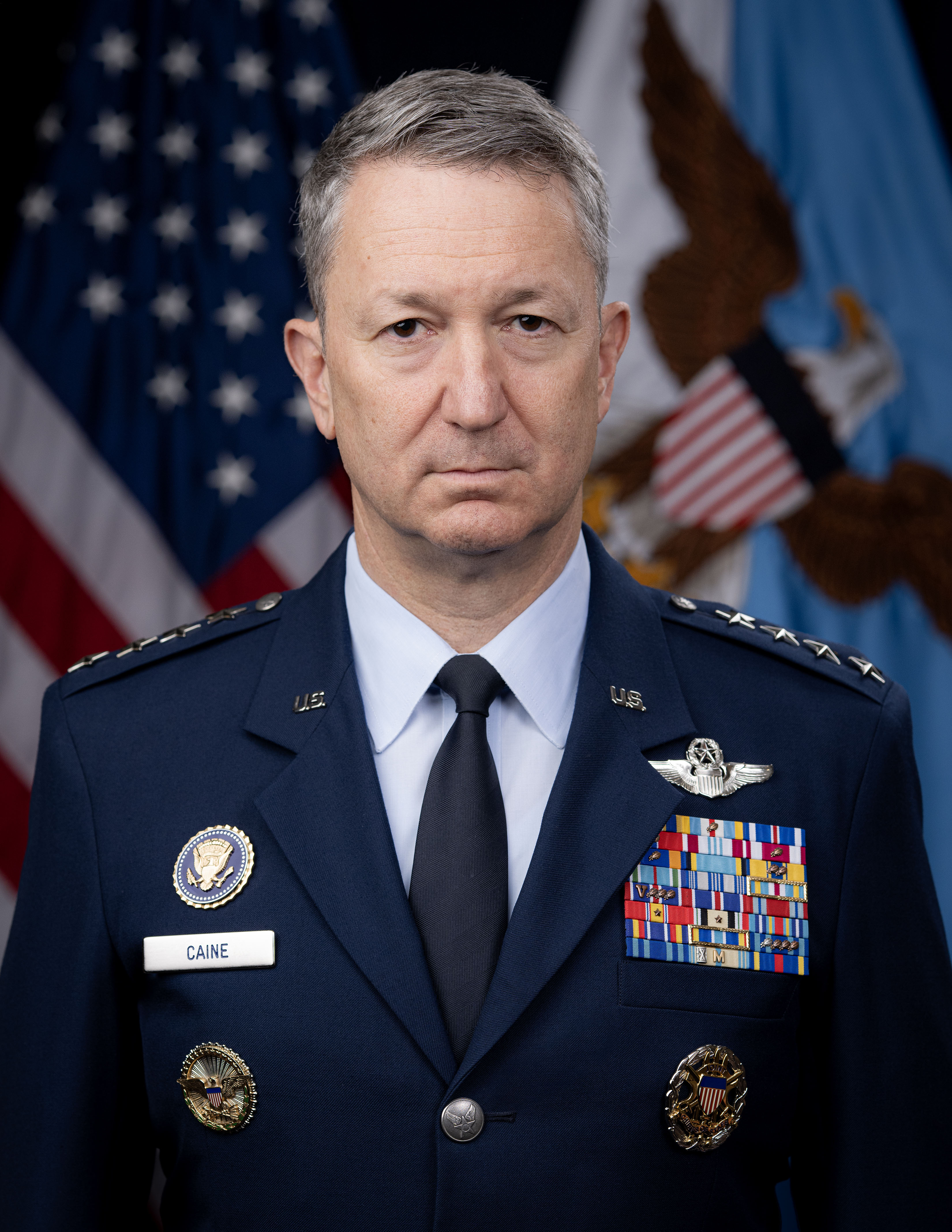
- Official portrait, 2026
- Born: John Daniel Caine; August 10, 1968 (age 58); Elmira, New York, U.S.
- Education: Virginia Military Institute (BA); American Military University (MA)
- Military career
- Allegiance: United States
- Branch: United States Air Force
- Service years: 1990–2024; 2025–present
- Rank: General
- Nickname: "Razin" Caine
- Commands: Chairman of the Joint Chiefs of Staff; Associate Director for Military Affairs, Central Intelligence Agency; Special Access Programs Central Office
- Conflicts: Iraqi no-fly zones conflict; Operation Southern Watch; Iraq War; 2003 invasion of Iraq; War against the Islamic State; Operation Inherent Resolve; Twelve-Day War; Operation Midnight Hammer; Operation Southern Spear; Operation Absolute Resolve; 2026 Iran war
- Awards: Air Force Distinguished Service Medal; Defense Superior Service Medal; Distinguished Flying Cross; Bronze Star Medal (2)
- Caine's voice Caine describes the timeline of Operation Midnight Hammer. Recorded 22 June 2025

John Daniel "Razin" (Note: The spelling of Caine's nickname varies between "Raizin Caine" and "Raisin Caine". In his announcement nominating Caine as chairman of the Joint Chiefs of Staff, President Donald Trump wrote "Razin Caine".) Caine (born August 10, 1968) is an American general who has served as the chairman of the Joint Chiefs of Staff since 2025. He served as the associate director for military affairs at the Central Intelligence Agency from 2021 to 2024.

Caine graduated from the Virginia Military Institute's Air Force Reserve Officer Training Corps in 1990 and served in various roles within the United States Air Force, mainly as an F-16 pilot. As of 2025, Caine has 2,800 flight hours and served two tours in Iraq. He was the assistant commanding general (CG) of Joint Special Operations Command from 2016 to 2018, a deputy commander for the Operation Inherent Resolve special operations task force from 2018 to 2019, and the director of special-access programs in the Office of the Under Secretary of Defense for Acquisition and Sustainment from 2019 to 2021. He retired from the military in 2024.

In February 2025, President Donald Trump nominated Caine as the chairman of the Joint Chiefs of Staff. Caine was confirmed by the U.S. Senate in April. He is the first chairman of the Joint Chiefs of Staff who never served at the rank of four-star general or admiral before being nominated. Furthermore, Caine is the first to be nominated while in retirement, and the first to have been nominated as a member of a reserve component. (Note: Maxwell D. Taylor, who had been called back into active duty in 1960 after retiring in 1959, was nominated as chairman of the Joint Chiefs of Staff in 1962 by president John F. Kennedy.)

== Personal life and education ==
John Daniel Caine was born in Elmira, New York, on August 10, 1968. His father, Steve Caine, is a retired USAF fighter pilot with the rank of lieutenant colonel. Caine is a graduate of Hahn American High School in Hahn, Rhineland-Palatinate, Germany. In 1990, he earned a bachelor of arts in economics from Virginia Military Institute. There, he played soccer for the VMI Keydets. In 2005, he earned a master of arts in air warfare from American Military University.

He has been married to Erin Colleen Carty since 2003, and they have two daughters together.

== Career ==
=== Bartender ===
Upon Caine earning his bachelor's degree, he moved to Carlisle, Pennsylvania, while his father was studying there at the U.S. Army War College. He went to every bank in Carlisle and could not get hired as a bank teller. Caine was walking dejectedly down High Street and saw a help wanted sign at Fast Eddie's Billiard Parlor & Saloon and was hired on the spot as their new bartender, though he did not have any mixology knowledge at the time.

=== Military service and training (1990–2024) ===
Caine was commissioned as a second lieutenant through the Virginia Military Institute's Air Force Reserve Officer Training Corps in October 1990, and was inducted into the Euro-NATO Joint Jet Pilot Training Program at Sheppard Air Force Base, Texas. He completed the program as a distinguished graduate in December 1993, but because the Air Force was being downsized around that time he was concerned that he might end up with a non-flying job. To avoid this he applied to a large number of Air National Guard (ANG) units, and was selected to be an F-16 pilot in the 138th Fighter Squadron at the Syracuse New York Air National Guard Base. Caine had that assignment from January 1994 to July 1998, and was also the squadron's chief of training and chief of weapons at different times.

In 1998, he completed the Squadron Officer School by correspondence. From July 1998 to January 1999, he was an F-16 instructor pilot and the chief of weapons for the 121st Fighter Squadron at Andrews Air Force Base, Maryland. Caine underwent further F-16 training at the USAF Weapons School, at its main location of Nellis Air Force Base, Nevada, and graduated from its Instructor Course in June 1999 as an outstanding graduate.

After his graduation from the USAF Weapons School he returned to his previous role with the 121st Fighter Squadron. Caine was among the pilots who patrolled Washington, D.C. airspace, in the aftermath of the September 11 attacks as the chief of weapons and tactics for the squadron. From November 2001 to February 2002 he was the chief of group weapons and tactics for the 332nd Air Expeditionary Wing in Kuwait and until January 2003 he was a counter-SCUD project officer for U.S. Central Command, at MacDill Air Force Base, Florida. During the 2003 invasion of Iraq, Caine developed a plan to counter Scud missiles possessed by Iraqi forces.

Caine was the chief of weapons and tactics for the 410th Air Expeditionary Wing until May 2003, when he was assigned to the Test Center at the Tucson Air National Guard Base, Arizona, as its head of operations. He held that position until August 2005, and in 2004 he completed the Air Command and Staff College by correspondence. Starting in 2005 he worked at the White House, and from October 2006 to January 2008 Caine was the policy director for counterterrorism and strategy at the Homeland Security Council. From January to July 2008 he was back in Iraq as the commander of the Joint Special Operations Task Force – Air Directorate.

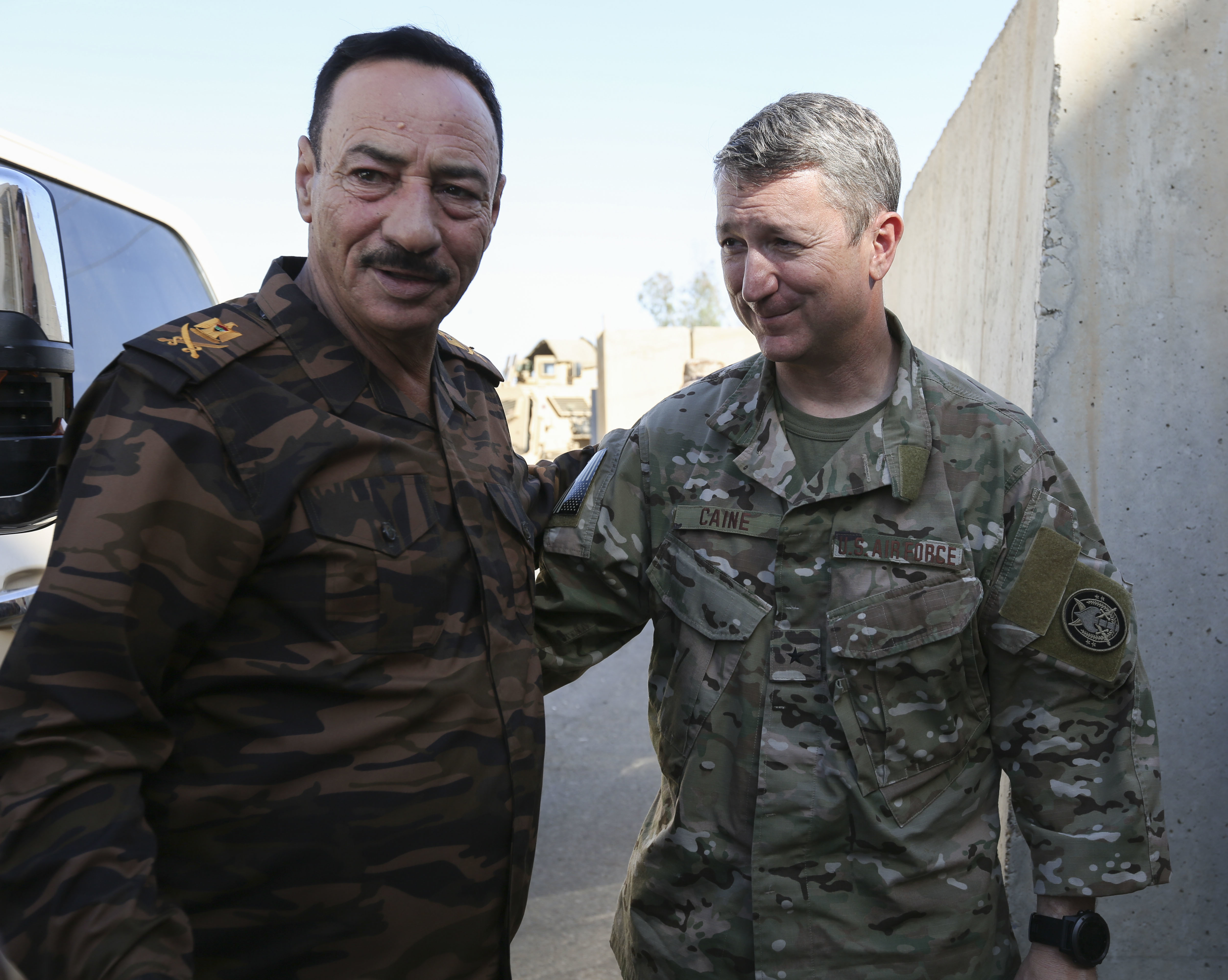
Major General Najim Abdullah al-Jubouri (left) with Caine in Mosul, Iraq, June 2018

In July 2008, he became an instructor pilot at the 121st Fighter Squadron and a Special Tactics Air Liaison Officer at the 24th Special Tactics Squadron of the Air Force Special Operations Command, remaining in those roles until 2010. Caine was a part-time member of the ANG from 2009 to 2016 and held several senior positions in the District of Columbia ANG.

After returning to active duty, he was simultaneously an assistant to the vice commander of the U.S. Special Operations Command and the assistant CG of the Joint Special Operations Command from 2016 to 2018. Caine completed the Joint and Combined Warfighting Course in 2017. He simultaneously served as a deputy CG of Special Operations Command Central and of the special operations joint task force in Operation Inherent Resolve, the campaign against the Islamic State in Iraq and Syria, from 2018 to 2019. After that Caine was the director of special-access programs in the Office of the Under Secretary of Defense for Acquisition and Sustainment from 2019 to 2021. Caine was promoted to three-star lieutenant general in 2021, and served as the CIA's associate director for military affairs from November 2021 until December 2024.

As of February 2025, Caine has 150 combat hours and two tours in Iraq. He has a total of 2,800 flight hours, including more than 100 combat hours in the F-16.

=== Public and private sector (since 2003) ===
From 2005 to 2006, as part of the White House Fellows program, Caine was a special assistant to the United States Secretary of Agriculture and did work related to the response to Hurricane Katrina. From 2006 to 2008, he served within the Homeland Security Council as a policy director for counterterrorism.

In 2010 he founded The Caine Group, an investment and consulting firm focusing on national security and homeland security.

His LinkedIn page notes that he has advised Voyager, a space technology company. In January 2025, he joined Shield Capital, a venture capital firm. Caine is a partner at Ribbit Capital and an advisor for Thrive Capital. He was the co-founder and chief operating officer of RISE Air, an airline company acquired by Surf Air in 2017 (unrelated to the Canadian airline Rise Air). His USAF service biography describes him as a "serial entrepreneur and investor".

== Chairman of the Joint Chiefs of Staff (since 2025) ==
=== Nomination and confirmation ===
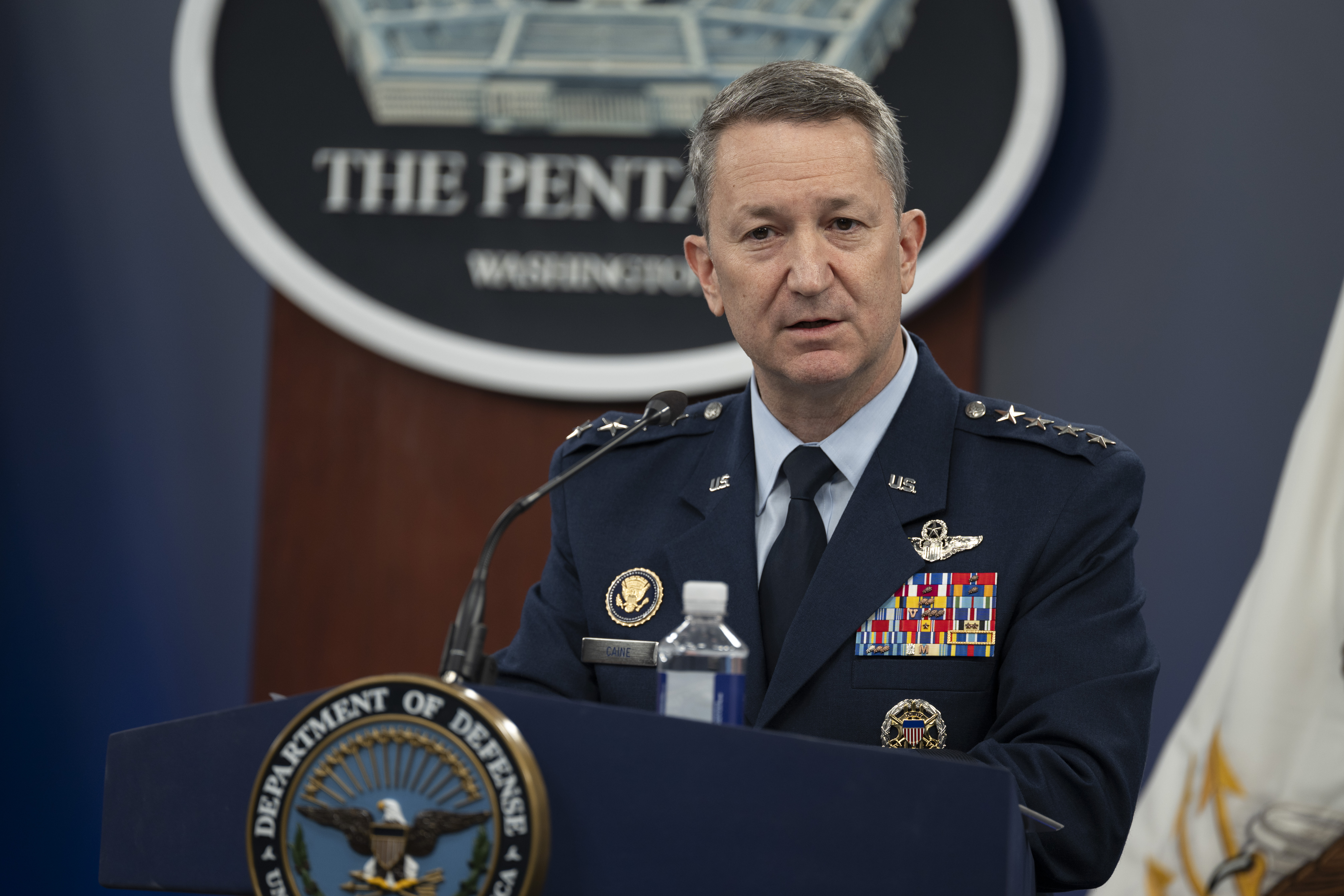
Caine speaking at the Pentagon following airstrikes on Iranian nuclear facilities, June 2025

On 21 February 2025, President Donald Trump named Caine as his nominee to replace Charles Q. Brown Jr., the chairman of the Joint Chiefs of Staff. Speaking at the 2019 Conservative Political Action Conference, Trump said he had met Caine in Iraq in December 2018. According to Trump, Caine told him, "I love you, sir. I think you're great, sir. I'll kill for you, sir." Allegedly, he claimed that ISIS could be defeated in a week. Trump also said that Caine was wearing a MAGA hat at the time, a detail denied by Caine.

According to The New York Times, Caine met with Trump and vice president JD Vance during the week prior to the announcement of the nomination. The Times later reported that Caine was considered for the position over Michael Kurilla, the commander of United States Central Command. Title 10 of the United States Code requires the chairman of the Joint Chiefs of Staff to be selected from the officers of the regular components of the armed forces and only if the officer had served as a combatant, unified, or specified commander, the Vice Chairman of the Joint Chiefs of Staff, or, if the officer had served as the highest uniformed officer in one of the six military service branches (although that requirement may be waived if "necessary in the national interest").

Caine's nomination was sent to the Senate on 10 March. He testified before the Senate Committee on Armed Services on 1 April. The committee voted to advance his nomination 23–4 on 8 April. Caine was confirmed on 11 April in a 60–25 vote. He was promoted to a four-star general prior to the vote. Caine was sworn in on 14 April. He is the first chairman of the Joint Chiefs of Staff who never served at the rank of four-star general or four-star admiral before assuming the position and the first to have been retired at the time of confirmation. Caine is the second retired general to serve as chairman after Maxwell D. Taylor in 1962, although Taylor had been recalled to active duty the year prior to his appointment (after he had retired in 1959). Caine is the first chairman since Hugh Shelton in 1997 who never served within the Joint Chiefs of Staff. He is the first Air National Guardsman to become chairman.

=== Initial tenure ===
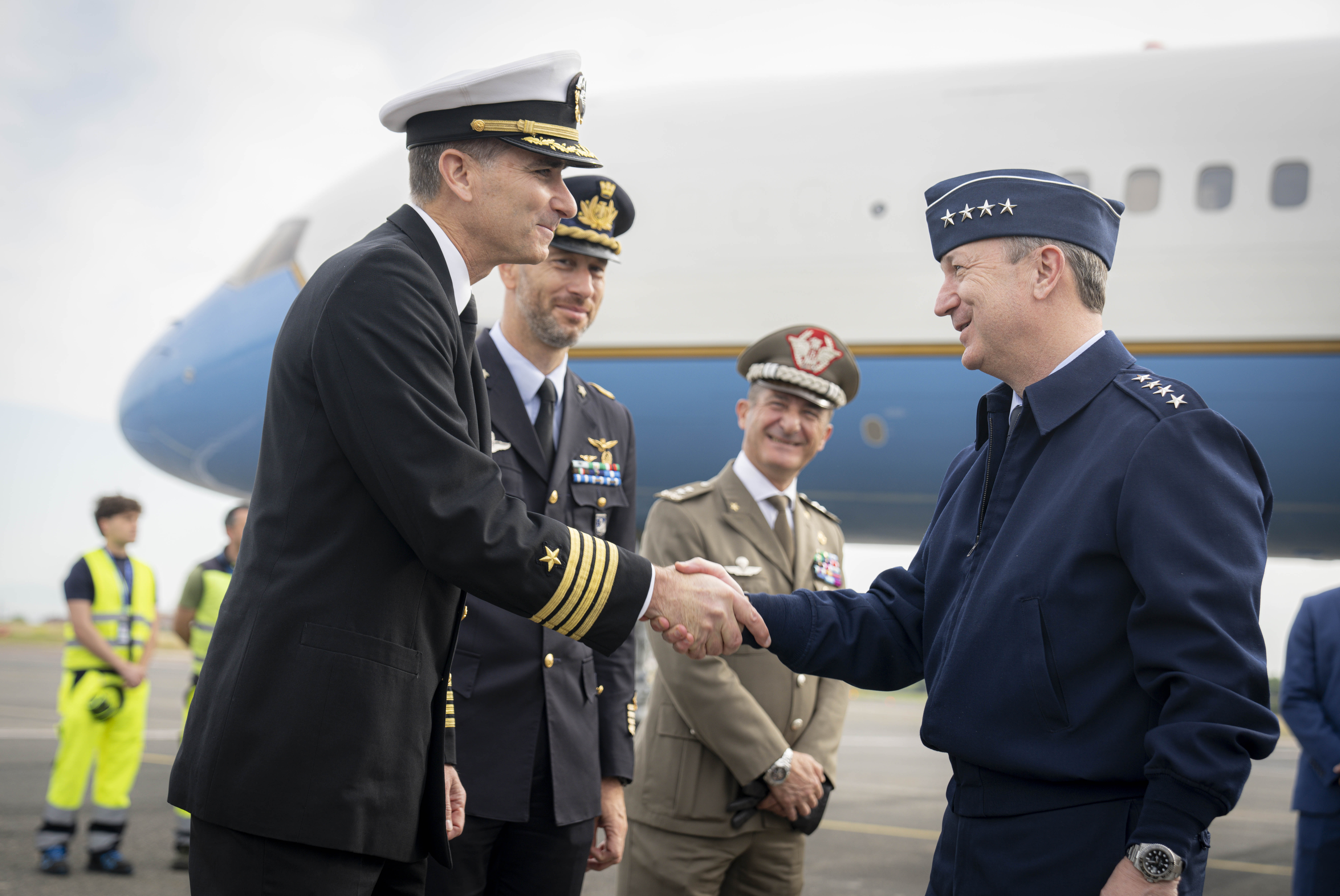
Caine (right) arrives at Ciampino Airport in Rome, Italy, 15 May 2025

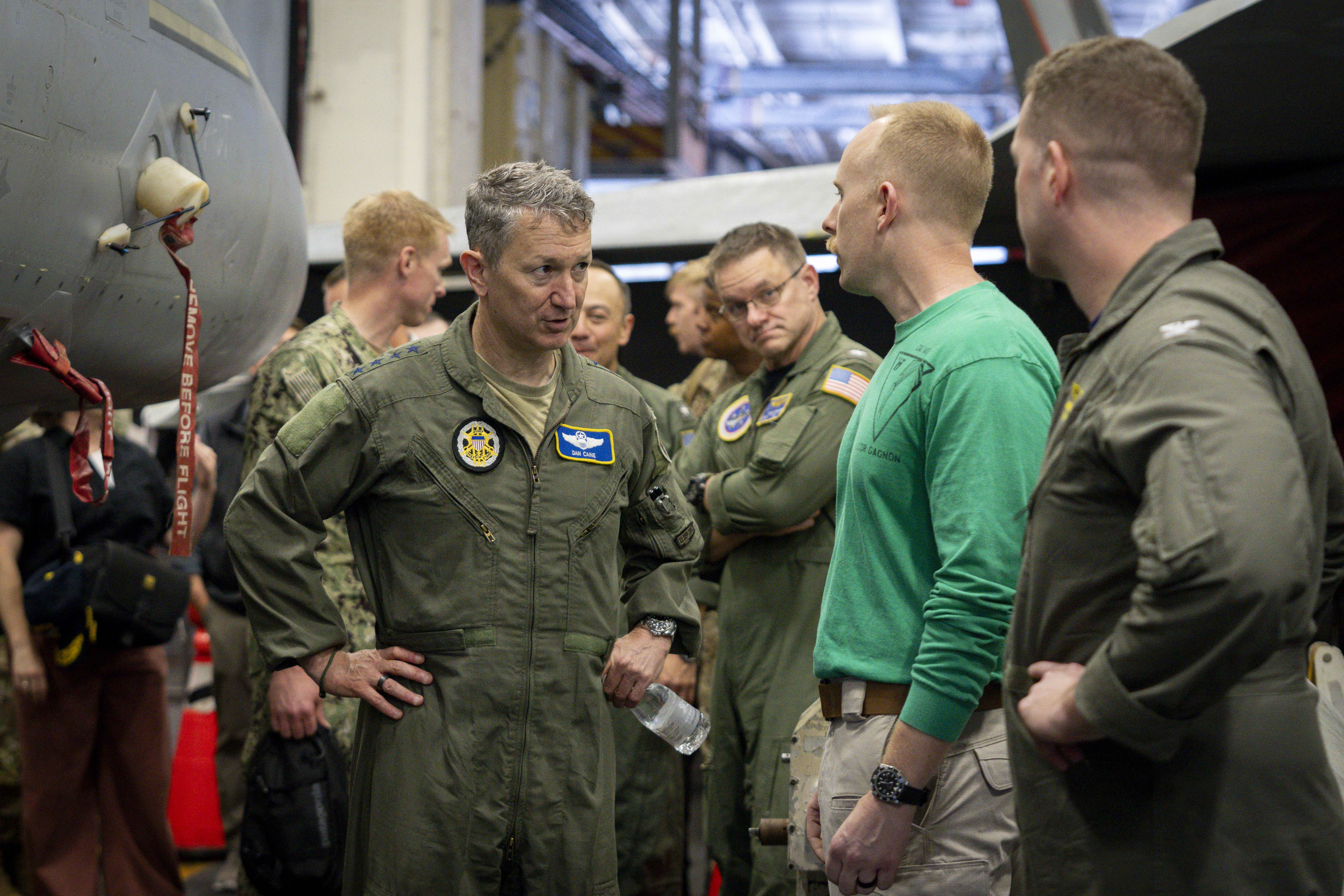
Caine aboard the aircraft carrier USS Nimitz in the Arabian Sea on 21 September 2025

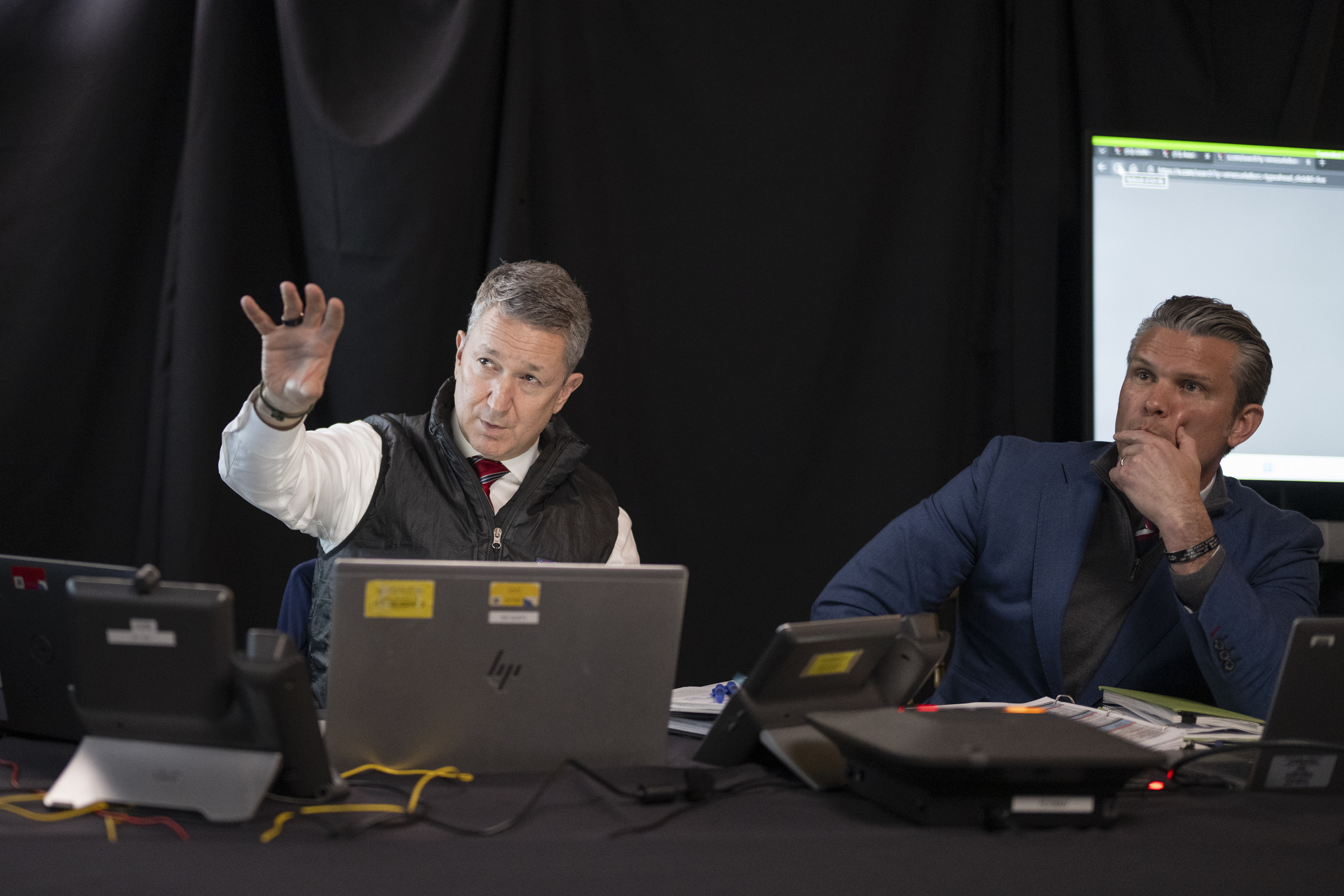
Caine and Secretary of Defense Pete Hegseth monitor Operation Absolute Resolve, 3 January 2026

After being confirmed, Caine made an unannounced visit to the Mexico–United States border during which he met with troops who were taking part in the U.S. Northern Command mission in support of Customs and Border Protection. In May 2025, Caine attended a NATO summit at the organization's headquarters in Brussels in which he deliberated on bolstering the alliance. That month, he privately expressed concern that extending the military campaign against the Houthis in Yemen would stress supply of assets he viewed as necessary, contributing to Trump's decision to immediately declare victory.

In June, Caine appeared before the Senate Appropriations Subcommittee on Defense, offering a view of the Russo-Ukrainian war that suggested that—if victorious—Russian president Vladimir Putin would initiate wars against other countries, refuting Trump's assessment of Putin. Caine rejected Trump's claim that the U.S. was being invaded, the pretense for Trump's 2025 decision to federalize the California National Guard in response to protests in Los Angeles.

Leading up to the June 2025 Twelve-Day War, Caine and John Ratcliffe, the director of the Central Intelligence Agency, gave an assessment to Trump on Israel's imminent attack on Iran from Camp David. Caine, with Michael Kurilla, the commander of United States Central Command, led plans for the U.S. military to strike at Iranian nuclear sites in 2025. He appeared with secretary of defense Pete Hegseth to provide details on the strike the following day. Caine's muted description of the strikes contrasted with Hegseth's assertion that mirrored Trump's description that the strikes had "obliterated" Iran's nuclear sites. At a second press conference with Hegseth days later, Caine focused on the service members responsible for the strike, which was interpreted as seeking to avoid politicizing the military while serving Trump's interests. According to The Wall Street Journal, the strikes, in addition to his follow-up comments, helped earn Caine the trust of Trump.

Following the 3 January 2026 U.S. intervention in Venezuela that led to the capture of Nicolás Maduro, Caine appeared alongside Trump and other senior officials in a press conference to report on the operation. During the Greenland crisis later in January, Trump asked Caine to present potential options and the impacts of using military force to invade and annex Greenland, part of the Kingdom of Denmark, ultimately resulting in Trump deciding against an invasion.

=== Iran war ===
During the Iran–United States crisis in February 2026, Caine advised Trump about the potential risks of a prolonged war with Iran, which Trump later denied. Caine had been the only military leader briefing Trump on Iran. He was supportive of the operation in Venezuela, but was more hesitant about Iran because of the higher risk of entanglement and U.S. casualties. Despite this, Caine helped convince Trump that such a war was viable. Caine himself reached this conclusion in part because of his conversations in early February with the Israel Defense Forces chief of staff, Lt. Gen. Eyal Zamir, who was critical in convincing him and Central Command chief Brad Cooper about its viability. Zamir, IDF intelligence chief Maj. Gen. Shlomi Binder, and Mossad director David Barnea visited Washington to make their case to U.S. officials, especially to Caine. Zamir emphasized to Caine the risk posed by Iran's ballistic missile program to Israel if imminent action was not taken, and that there was a unique moment of opportunity after the January protests in Iran.

At the meeting between Donald Trump and Israeli Prime Minister Benjamin Netanyahu on 12 February in Washington, Netanyahu presented a four-step plan. Caine and Cooper supported the first two steps of Netanyahu's plan, the assassination of Ali Khamenei and airstrikes on Iran's ballistic missile program and drone program, while being more hesitant on the last two steps of fomenting an uprising and using Kurdish groups to achieve regime change. Caine and Cooper briefed Trump on military options regarding Iran on 26 February. Neither of them provided much information to Trump about the potential closure of the Strait of Hormuz. At the start of the 2026 Iran war that began on 28 February, Caine and Hegseth monitored the U.S. operation with Trump at his Mar-a-Lago resort in Florida. Caine, along with the support of Cooper, kept the involvement of U.S. forces focused on striking Iran's military capabilities, while leaving the goal of regime change—attacks on Islamic Revolutionary Guard Corps leaders and command centers—to the Israeli military. Caine did not publicly endorse the goal of regime change, despite Trump calling for it on multiple occasions during the war.

On 10 March, Caine acknowledged that Iran was fighting back, but not harder than the U.S. expected before the war. During hearings held by Congress in May, Caine avoided answering questions about the U.S. military strategy in the war. In late July, amidst the two-week bombing campaign in southern Iran, Caine advised Trump that a shortage of air defense interceptors that could leave American forces vulnerable to Iranian attacks. This contributed to Trump's decision to halt the air campaign on 24 July.

== Dates of rank ==
Caine's dates of rank are:

Insignia	Rank	Date
	General	11 April 2025
	Lieutenant general	3 November 2021
	Major general	9 September 2019
	Brigadier general	5 May 2016
	Colonel	10 January 2011
	Lieutenant colonel	8 April 2005
	Major	28 December 2000
	Captain	10 October 1995
	First lieutenant	1 October 1993
	Second lieutenant	1 October 1990

== Awards and decorations ==
Caine's awards and decorations include:

Command Pilot Badge
Office of the Joint Chiefs of Staff Identification Badge	Presidential Service Badge	Office of the Secretary of Defense Identification Badge
Air Force Distinguished Service Medal		Defense Superior Service Medal
Distinguished Flying Cross	Bronze Star Medal with bronze oak leaf cluster	Defense Meritorious Service Medal
Meritorious Service Medal with bronze oak leaf cluster	Air Medal with bronze oak leaf cluster	Aerial Achievement Medal
Air and Space Commendation Medal with two bronze oak leaf clusters	Joint Service Achievement Medal	Air and Space Achievement Medal
Air and Space Outstanding Unit Award with three bronze oak leaf clusters and "V" device	Air and Space Outstanding Unit Award	Combat Readiness Medal
National Defense Service Medal with bronze service star	Iraq Campaign Medal with two bronze service stars	Global War on Terrorism Expeditionary Medal
Global War on Terrorism Service Medal	Air and Space Expeditionary Service Ribbon with gold frame	Air and Space Longevity Service Award (9 awards)
Air and Space Longevity Service Award (10th award)	Armed Forces Reserve Medal with silver hourglass and "M" device	Air and Space Training Ribbon

- He is also a recipient of the Weapons School Graduate Patch.
- In 2026, Caine received the Golden Plate Award of the American Academy of Achievement.

== Notes ==
Military offices
Preceded by Timothy Szymanski	Assistant Commanding General of Joint Special Operations Command; 2016–2018	Succeeded by David H. Tabor
Preceded by James F. Glynn	Deputy Commanding General of Special Operations Joint Task Force – Operation Inherent Resolve; 2018–2019	Succeeded by
Preceded by Dawn Dunlop	Director of Special Access Program Central Office of the Office of the Under Secretary of Defense for Acquisition and Sustainment; 2019–2021	Succeeded by David W. Abba
Preceded by Colin J. Kilrain	Associate Director for Military Affairs of the Central Intelligence Agency; 2021–2024	Succeeded by Michael L. Downs
Preceded by Christopher W. Grady; Acting	Chairman of the Joint Chiefs of Staff; 2025–present	Incumbent
U.S. order of precedence (ceremonial)
Preceded by Troy Meink as Secretary of the Air Force	Order of precedence of the United States as Chairman of the Joint Chiefs of Staff	Succeeded by Kevin Warsh as Chair of the Federal Reserve
