= Larry O. Spencer =

US Air Force general

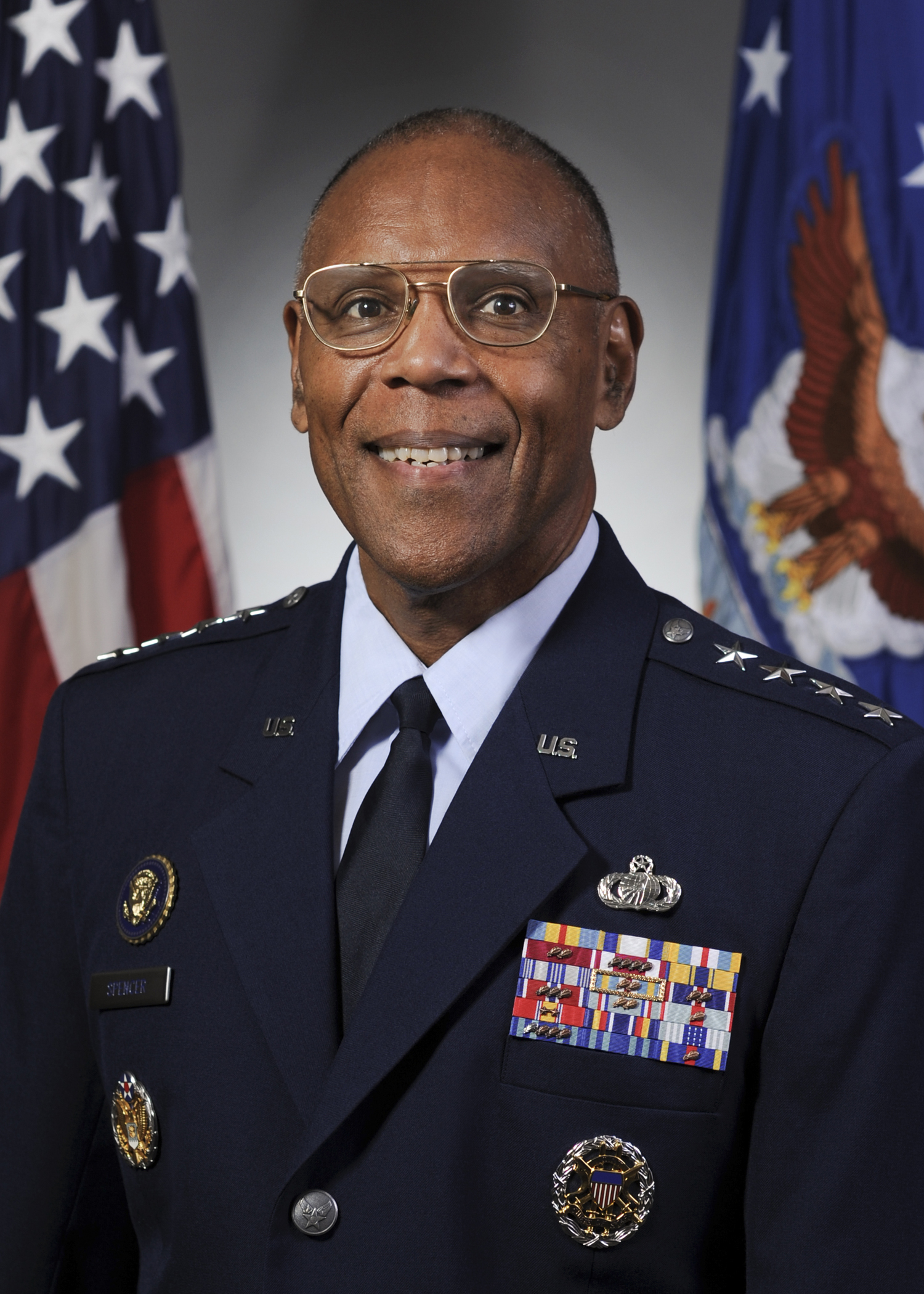
- General Larry O. Spencer in 2012
- Born: 1 August 1954 (age 72); Washington, D.C., United States
- Military career
- Allegiance: United States
- Branch: United States Air Force
- Service years: 1971–2015
- Rank: General
- Commands: Vice Chief of Staff of the United States Air Force; 75th Air Base Wing; 72nd Support Group; 4th Comptroller Squadron
- Awards: Defense Distinguished Service Medal; Air Force Distinguished Service Medal (2); Defense Superior Service Medal; Legion of Merit (3)

Larry Oneil Spencer (born 1 August 1954) is a retired United States Air Force general who served in many command, comptroller, and leadership roles during the course of his career. Some of his leadership roles included being the Vice Chief of Staff of the United States Air Force, commander of the 75th Air Base Wing at Hill AFB, commander of the 72nd Support Group at Tinker AFB, and the commander of the 4th Comptroller Squadron at Seymour Johnson AFB. He retired 1 October 2015 after more than 44 years of service. He received the Defense Distinguished Service Medal, the Air Force Distinguished Service Medal, the Defense Superior Service Medal, and the Legion of Merit.

== Personal life ==
Spencer was born in Washington, D.C., on 1 August 1954. He later moved with his family to Seat Pleasant in Prince George's County, Maryland, a suburb just outside Washington. Spencer attended Central High School in Prince George's County, where he participated in academic and varsity sports programs that helped him develop leadership and personal discipline.

Spencer is married to Ora Mae Spencer. Together they have three children; Larry O'neil Spencer II (married to Reem Spencer), Derrick Lajuane Spencer (married to Gina Spencer), and Shannon Christine Spencer-Watson (married to Michael Watson).

== Enlisted service ==
In 1971, Spencer walked into a recruiting office in Suitland, Maryland, and signed up for the Air Force. His first job as an airman was as an administrative clerk at Pope Air Force Base in North Carolina. He was then sent to Taiwan, where he was promoted to airman first class. After his overseas assignment, the Air Force sent Spencer to Whiteman Air Force Base in Missouri, a Strategic Air Command base.

As Spencer's period of enlistment came to an end, he was offered a football scholarship at Clemson University. However, he decided to re-enlist and focused his attention on getting his bachelor's degree while he continued to serve in the Air Force. He began taking weekend classes from Southern Illinois University. In 1979, he was awarded a bachelor's degree in industrial engineering technology. Spencer then applied and was accepted into Officer Training School. He finished the training program as a distinguished graduate and was commissioned a second lieutenant in February 1980.

== Air Force officer ==
As a second lieutenant, Spencer was assigned to the financial management career field. His first officer assignment in 1980 was as a cost analyst for the Air Force Reserve Command at Robins Air Force Base in Georgia. During that three-year tour Spencer served as the chief of the headquarters cost analysis branch. In 1982, he was transferred to the Pentagon. He served on the Air Staff for four years, first as a cost analyst and then a budget officer.

In August 1986, Spencer was reassigned to Military Airlift Command headquarters at Scott Air Force Base in Illinois. He served three years there, first as a budget officer and then as an executive officer. He attended the Marine Corps Command and Staff College in Quantico, Virginia from July 1989 until January 1990. After graduating from that military education program, he was selected to his first command. Spencer was commander of the 4th Comptroller Squadron at Seymour Johnson Air Force Base in North Carolina for three years. During his tenure as commander, the 4th Comptroller Squadron was selected as the best comptroller unit in the Air Force, first in 1991 and then again in 1992. This was the first time a comptroller squadron had received best in the Air Force recognition two consecutive years.

In August 1993, Spencer was selected to attend the Industrial College of the Armed Forces at Fort Lesley J. McNair, receiving a Master of Science degree from the college in June 1994. This was followed by an assignment to the White House Military Office, where he was the first Air Force officer to serve as assistant chief of staff. Spencer was then selected for group command. He served as commander of the 72nd Support Group at Tinker Air Force Base in Oklahoma from August 1996 to January 1998. He was promoted to colonel during that assignment. As a result of his successful tour as a group commander, Spencer was selected for a wing command. He took command of the 75th Air Base Wing at Hill Air Force Base in Utah, serving there from February 1998 until July 1999. His next assignment was at Headquarters Air Combat Command at Langley Air Force Base in Virginia, where he served as the command's comptroller from September 1999 until June 2003.

== Flag rank service ==
Spencer was transferred to Wright-Patterson Air Force Base in Ohio in June 2003, where he became director of mission support at Headquarters Air Force Materiel Command. In this role, Spencer was responsible for overseeing installation support for the command. This included civil engineering, communications, force protection, and base morale and welfare services. These functions supported daily operations at 10 installations across the United States. Spencer was promoted to brigadier general in July 2004. In August 2005, he was transferred to the Oklahoma City Air Logistics Center at Tinker Air Force Base, where he served as the center's vice commander for one year.

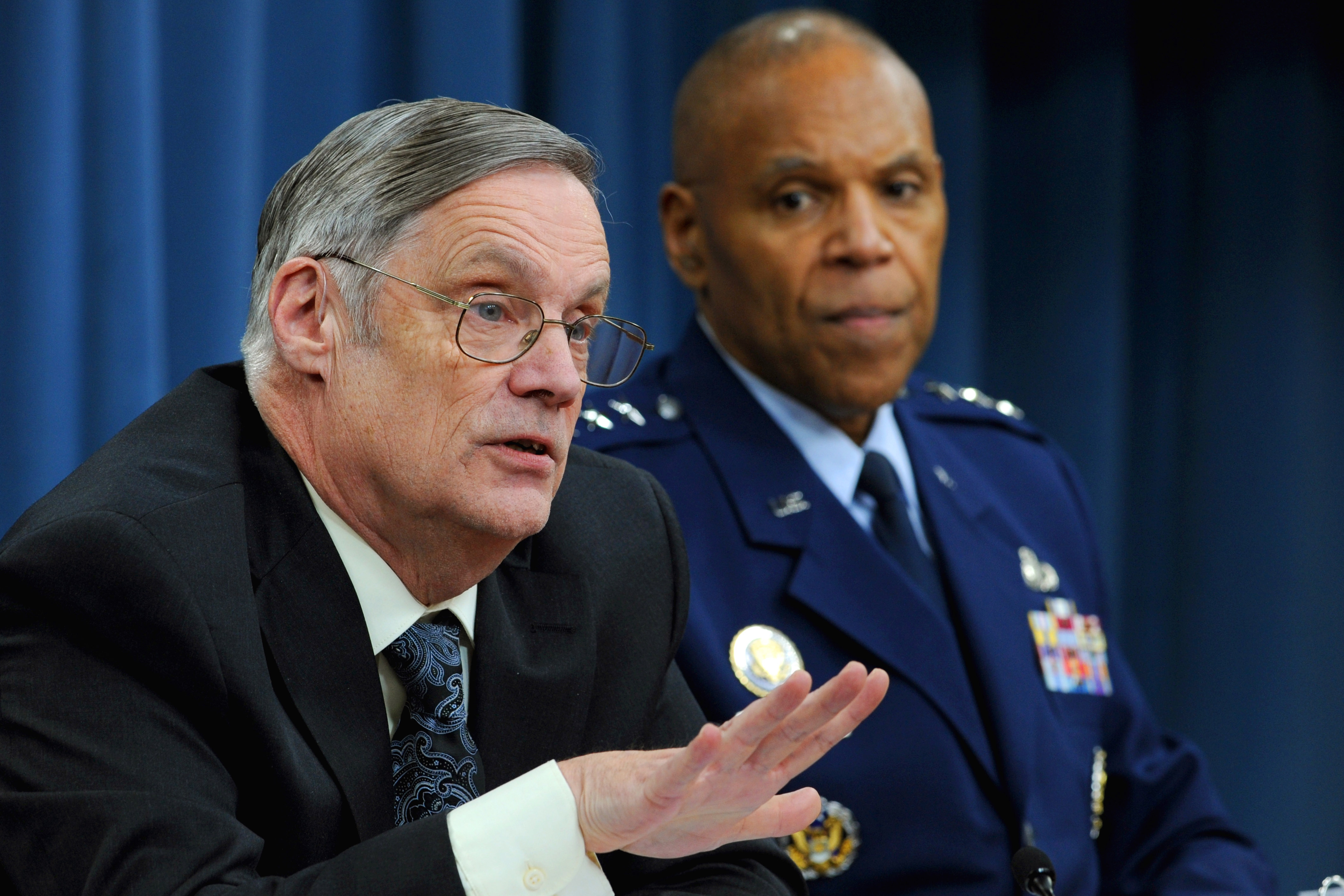
General Spencer and Robert Hale discussing DOD's budget

In August 2006, Spencer returned to the Pentagon to serve as director of budget operations and personnel in the office of the Assistant Secretary of the Air Force for Financial Management and Comptroller. In August 2007, he was promoted to major general. He became the Air Force's Deputy Assistant Secretary for Budget in October of that year. During his tour as deputy assistant secretary for budget, Spencer received the Eugene M. Zuckert Management Award. The award cited his leadership in developing the President's 2008 budget and his work to secure the 2007 and 2008 supplemental appropriations needed to fund war operations in Iraq and Afghanistan. During this period, Spencer also served on the Army and Air Force Exchange Service board of directors and the Air Force Aid Society board of directors.

Spencer was promoted to lieutenant general in April 2010, prior to moving to the Pentagon's Joint Staff as director of Force Structure, Resources and Assessment (also known as "J8"). In this position, he was responsible for overseeing the developing defense weapon systems, conducting studies and analysis of military force structure and requirements, and evaluating military programs and resourcing strategies for the Joint Chiefs of Staff. Spencer also served as chairman of the Joint Capabilities Board and secretary for the Joint Requirements Oversight Council. In 2010, US Black Engineer and Information Technology Magazine honored Spencer with the Black Engineer of the Year Career Achievement in Government Award.

On 11 May 2012, the President nominated Spencer for promotion to general and recommended him for appointment as Vice Chief of Staff of the Air Force. The United States Senate confirmed his nomination and appointment as Vice Chief on 24 May 2012. He was officially promoted to four-star general 27 July 2012, the same day he assumed the duties of Vice Chief of Staff of the Air Force. As Vice Chief of Staff, Spencer directed the Air Staff and was the Air Force's representative on the Joint Requirements Oversight Council and several other joint service boards. He also assisted the Chief of Staff of the Air Force with the organizing, training, and equipping of the 690,000 active-duty, Air National Guard, Air Force Reserve, and civilian personnel who make up the United States Air Force. Spencer retired from the Air Force on 1 October 2015.

== Post-military career ==
After retiring from the Air Force in 2015, Spencer became president of the Air Force Association. In that position, he oversees the association's professional staff and manages the organization's day-to-day operations. He is also the publisher of Air Force Magazine, the association's professional journal. Under his leadership, the Air Force Association set records for membership growth and revenue generation.

In 2019, Spencer left the Air Force Association. The following year, he became president of the Armed Forces Benefit Association and 5Star Life Insurance Company. Spencer has been a member of the Whirlpool Corporation board of director since 2016, and as of 2021, he is also a member of the board of directors for Triumph Group and Haynes International. In addition, he is a distinguished senior fellow of University of Pennsylvania's Fels Institute of Government and a member of the Defense Business Board, a group that provides the Secretary of Defense with independent private sector advice on business management related issues.

== Legacy ==
There are two Air Force awards named in Spencer's honor. In June 2015, the Air Force created an award to recognize innovation and efficiency within the Service, naming it in honor of Spencer. The General Larry O. Spencer Innovation Award is an outgrowth of two programs Spencer created as Vice Chief of Staff, The Make Every Dollar Count and Airmen Powered by Innovation programs encouraged airmen bring new ideas into Air Force operations, helping to create a culture of innovation throughout the Air Force. The Air Force also presents, the General Larry Spencer Special Acts and Services Award.

Spencer is the author of two books. His first book is titled The Green Eyeshades of War. Published in 2016, it is a history of military financial management during war time. His second book is an autobiography titled Dark Horse, published in 2021.

The following four sections are from this Public Domain source.

== Education ==
- 1979 Bachelor of Science in industrial engineering technology, Southern Illinois University, Carbondale
- 1980 Officer Training School (distinguished graduate), Lackland Air Force Base, Texas
- 1983 Squadron Officer School (distinguished graduate), Maxwell Air Force Base, Alabama
- 1987 Master of Science in business management, Webster College, St. Louis, Missouri
- 1990 Marine Corps Command and Staff College, Quantico, Virginia
- 1994 Master of Science in resource strategy (distinguished graduate), Industrial College of the Armed Forces, National Defense University, Fort Lesley J. McNair, Washington, D.C.
- 2005 Logistics Technology, University of North Carolina, Chapel Hill, North Carolina
- 2005 Black Sea Region Seminar, John F. Kennedy School of Government, Harvard University, Cambridge, Massachusetts
- 2007 Systems Acquisition Management Course, Defense Acquisition University, Fort Belvoir, Virginia
- 2011 Pinnacle, Joint, Coalition and Interagency Studies program, National Defense University, Fort Lesley J. McNair, Washington, D.C.

== Assignments ==
1. February 1980 – July 1982, Chief, Cost Analysis Branch, Headquarters Air Force Reserve, Robins Air Force Base, Georgia
2. July 1982 – August 1986, cost and budget officer, Headquarters United States Air Force, Pentagon, Washington, D.C.
3. August 1986 – July 1989, budget officer and executive officer, Headquarters Military Airlift Command, Scott Air Force Base, Illinois
4. July 1989 – June 1990, student, Marine Corps Command and Staff College, Quantico, Virginia
5. June 1990 – August 1993, commander, 4th Comptroller Squadron, Seymour Johnson Air Force Base, North Carolina
6. August 1993 – June 1994, student and research fellow, Industrial College of the Armed Forces, Fort Lesley J. McNair, Washington, D.C.
7. June 1994 – August 1996, assistant chief of staff, White House Military Office, Washington, D.C.
8. August 1996 – January 1998, commander, 72nd Support Group, Tinker Air Force Base, Oklahoma
9. February 1998 – July 1999, commander, 75th Air Base Wing, Hill Air Force Base, Utah
10. September 1999 – June 2003, command comptroller, Headquarters Air Combat Command, Langley Air Force Base, Virginia
11. June 2003 – August 2005, director of mission support, Headquarters Air Force Materiel Command, Wright-Patterson Air Force Base, Ohio
12. August 2005 – August 2006, vice director, Oklahoma City Air Logistics Center, Tinker AFB, Oklahoma
13. August 2006 – October 2007, director of budget operations and personnel, Office of the Assistant Secretary of the Air Force for Financial Management and Comptroller, Pentagon, Washington, D.C.
14. October 2007 – March 2010, deputy assistant secretary for budget, Office of the Assistant Secretary of the Air Force for Financial Management and Comptroller, Pentagon, Washington, D.C.
15. April 2010 – July 2012, director of force structure, resources and assessments, Joint Staff, Pentagon, Washington, D.C.
16. July 2012 – August 2015, Vice Chief of Staff of the Air Force, Headquarters United States Air Force, Pentagon, Washington, D.C.

== Awards and decorations ==
Spencer's awards and decorations include:

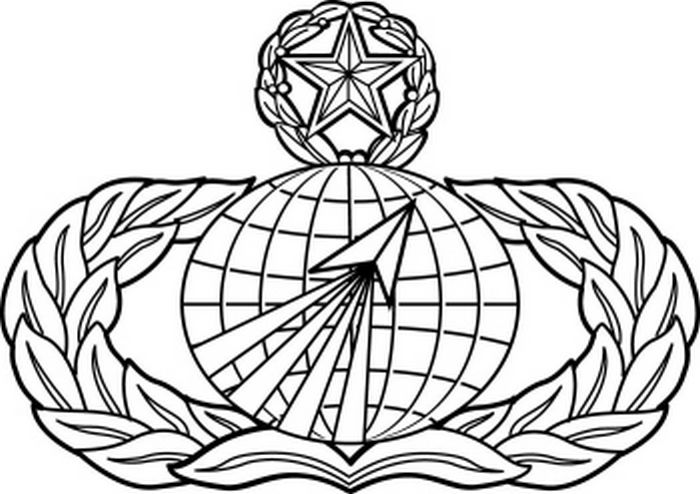
Basic Maintenance and Munitions Badge
Master Acquisition and Financial Management Badge
Joint Chiefs of Staff Badge
Headquarters Air Force Badge
Presidential Service Badge

Defense Distinguished Service Medal
Air Force Distinguished Service Medal with one bronze oak leaf cluster
Defense Superior Service Medal
Legion of Merit with two bronze oak leaf clusters
Meritorious Service Medal with four bronze oak leaf clusters
Air Force Commendation Medal
Air Force Achievement Medal
Joint Meritorious Unit Award with two bronze oak leaf clusters
Air Force Outstanding Unit Award with two bronze oak leaf clusters
Air Force Organizational Excellence Award with three bronze oak leaf clusters
Air Force Good Conduct Medal with two bronze oak leaf clusters
Air Force Recognition Ribbon with one bronze oak leaf cluster
National Defense Service Medal with two bronze service stars
Global War on Terrorism Service Medal
Air Force Overseas Short Tour Service Ribbon
Air Force Longevity Service Award with two silver oak leaf clusters
Air Force Training Ribbon with one bronze oak leaf cluster

== Effective dates of promotion ==
Insignia	Rank	Date
	General	July 27, 2012
	Lieutenant general	April 3, 2010
	Major general	Aug. 29, 2007
	Brigadier general	July 1, 2004
	Colonel	Jan. 1, 1998
	Lieutenant colonel	April 1, 1992
	Major	Dec. 1, 1988
	Captain	Feb. 14, 1984
	First lieutenant	Feb. 14, 1982
	Second lieutenant	Feb. 14, 1980

- General Spencer served as a non-commissioned officer for around nine years before receiving his commission in 1980.

Military offices
Preceded by P. Stephen Stanley	Director for Force Structure, Resources, and Assessment of the Joint Staff; 2012–2012	Succeeded by Mark F. Ramsay
Preceded by Philip M. Breedlove	Vice Chief of Staff of the United States Air Force; 2012–2015	Succeeded by David L. Goldfein
