= James Pasquarette =

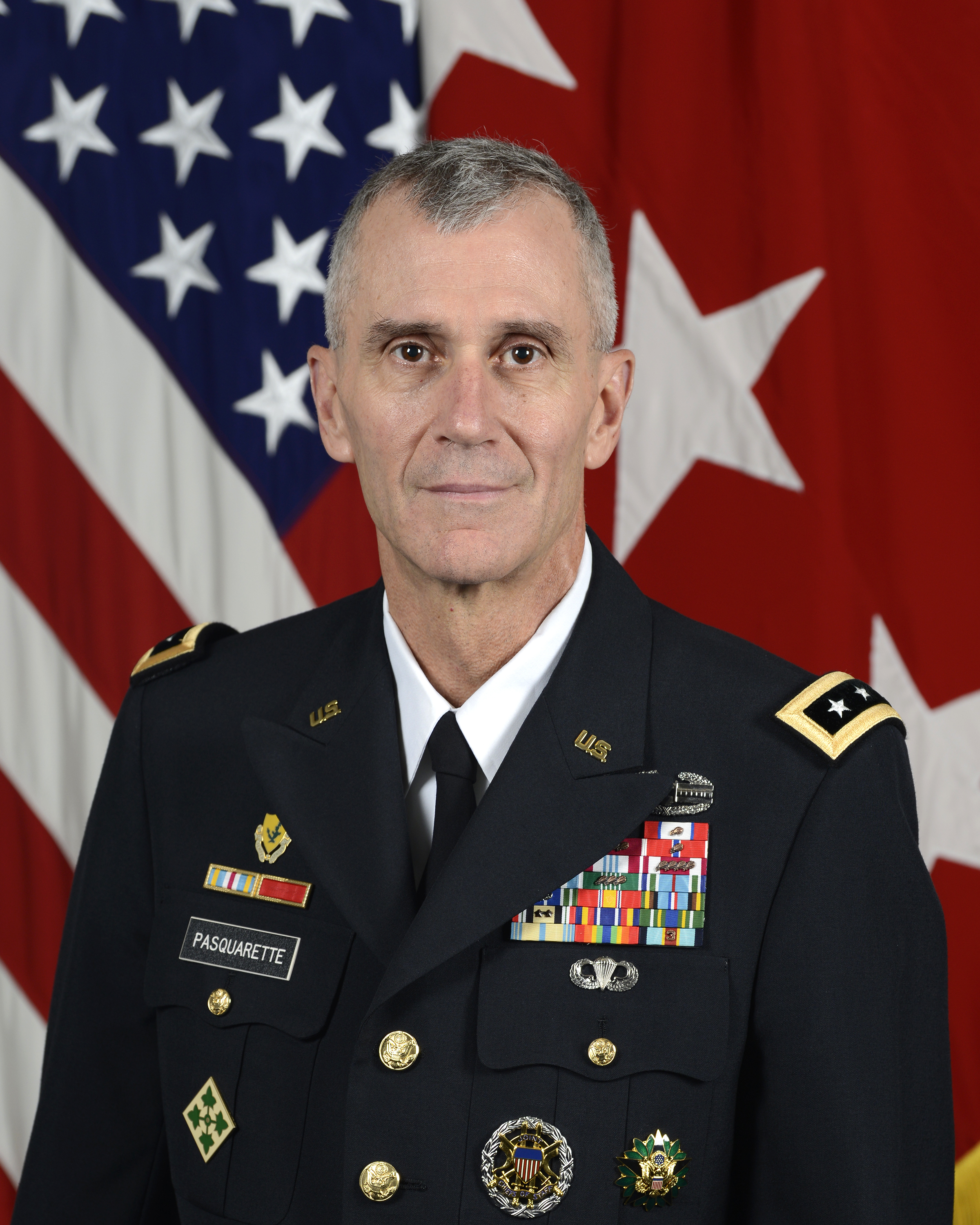
- Born: 1961 (age 64–65)
- Spouse: Liz Pasquarette
- Children: 3 (sons)
- Military career
- Allegiance: United States
- Branch: United States Army
- Service years: 1983–2021
- Rank: Lieutenant General
- Commands: 1st Brigade, 4th Infantry Division; 2nd Battalion, 12th Cavalry Regiment
- Conflicts: Iraq War
- Awards: Army Distinguished Service Medal (2); Legion of Merit (3); Bronze Star Medal (2)

James F. Pasquarette (born 1961) is a retired lieutenant general in the United States Army, who last served as the deputy Chief of Staff of the Army G-8, previously serving as Commanding General of United States Army Japan. He is a graduate of Furman University and was commissioned in 1983.

Pasquarette retired from the Army effective May 27, 2021.

== Dates of rank ==
Rank	Date
Brigadier General	September 15, 2010
Major General	July 2, 2013
Lieutenant General	August 29, 2018

Military offices
Preceded by ???	Chief of Staff of the United States Army Pacific; 2013–2014	Succeeded by Todd B. McCaffrey
Preceded by ???	Deputy Commanding General of the United States Army Pacific; 2014–2015	Succeeded by Todd B. McCaffrey
Preceded by James C. Boozer Sr.	Commanding General of the United States Army Japan; 2015–2018	Succeeded by Viet Xuan Luong
Preceded by Anthony R. Ierardi	Deputy Chief of Staff for Programs of the United States Army; 2019–2021	Succeeded by Erik C. Peterson
