= CIA's relationship with the United States Military =

The Central Intelligence Agency needs to liaise with the United States Armed Forces, and a range of organizational structures have been used since the formation of the CIA to facilitate this liaison.

== National Intelligence Support Team ==
A NIST normally is composed of personnel from DIA, NSA, NIMA, and the CIA who are deployed upon request by the military commander to facilitate the flow of timely all-source intelligence between a Joint Task Force (JTF) and Washington, DC, during crises or contingency operations.

== Bureaucratic structure ==
Associate Deputy Director of Operations for Military Affairs (ADDO/MA)

This position 'faded off the org chart' after the creation of the ADCI/MS c. 1995

Associate Director of Central Intelligence for Military Support (ADCI/MS)
or Associate Director of Military Support
or Assistant Director for Military Support
and finally, Associate Director for Military Affairs

This position was created by CIA Director John Deutch in 1995 He called it the 'Associate Director for Military Affairs' in a report in 1996, but that name was not used until the late 1st decade of the 21st century in official documents, like org charts, and the 110th congress DoD appropriations bill says that Title IX Subtitle D will undergo changes "necessitated by the redesignation of the CIA's Assistant Director for Military Support as the Associate Director for Military Affairs."

Office of Military Affairs

- 1992 - Created by CIA after problems during the Gulf War
- 1995/1996 - Moved out of the Directorate of Operations by ADCI/MS Dennis C. Blair, to be directly under his office, which reported directly to the Director

OMA is staffed by CIA and military personnel. As the agency's single POC for military support, OMA negotiates, coordinates, manages, and monitors all aspects of agency support for military operations. This support is a continuous process that can be enhanced or modified to respond to a crisis or developing operation. Interaction between OMA and the DCI representatives to the OSD, the Joint Staff, and the combatant commands facilitates the provision of national-level intelligence in support of joint operations, operation planning, and exercises.

== List of associate directors for military affairs ==
No.	Portrait	Name	Term of office			Service branch	Ref.
No.	Portrait	Name	Took office	Left office	Time in office	Service branch	Ref.
		Vice Admiral Dennis C. Blair	1995	1996	ayd	United States Navy	
		Lieutenant General John A. Gordon	1996	1997		United States Air Force	
		Lieutenant General John H. Campbell	2000	2003		United States Air Force	
		Vice Admiral Albert Calland III	2004	2005		United States Navy	
		Major General John T. Brennan	2006	2008		United States Air Force	
		Lieutenant General Mark A. Welsh III	2008	2010		United States Air Force	
		Lieutenant General Kurt A. Cichowski	2010	2013		United States Air Force	
-		Lieutenant General; Raymond A. Thomas III	2013	2014	1 year, 0 days	United States Army	
-		Lieutenant General; John F. Mulholland Jr.	January 9, 2015	October 4, 2016	1 year, 269 days	United States Army	
-		Vice Admiral; P. Gardner Howe III	October 4, 2016	November 8, 2019	3 years, 35 days	United States Navy	
-		Vice Admiral; Colin J. Kilrain	November 8, 2019	October 20, 2021	1 year, 346 days	United States Navy	
-		Lieutenant General; John D. Caine	November 3, 2021	December 2, 2024	3 years, 29 days	United States Air Force	
-		Lieutenant General; Michael L. Downs	December 2, 2024	Incumbent	1 year, 139 days	United States Air Force	
