= Mark F. Ramsay =

US Air Force officer (born c. 1958)

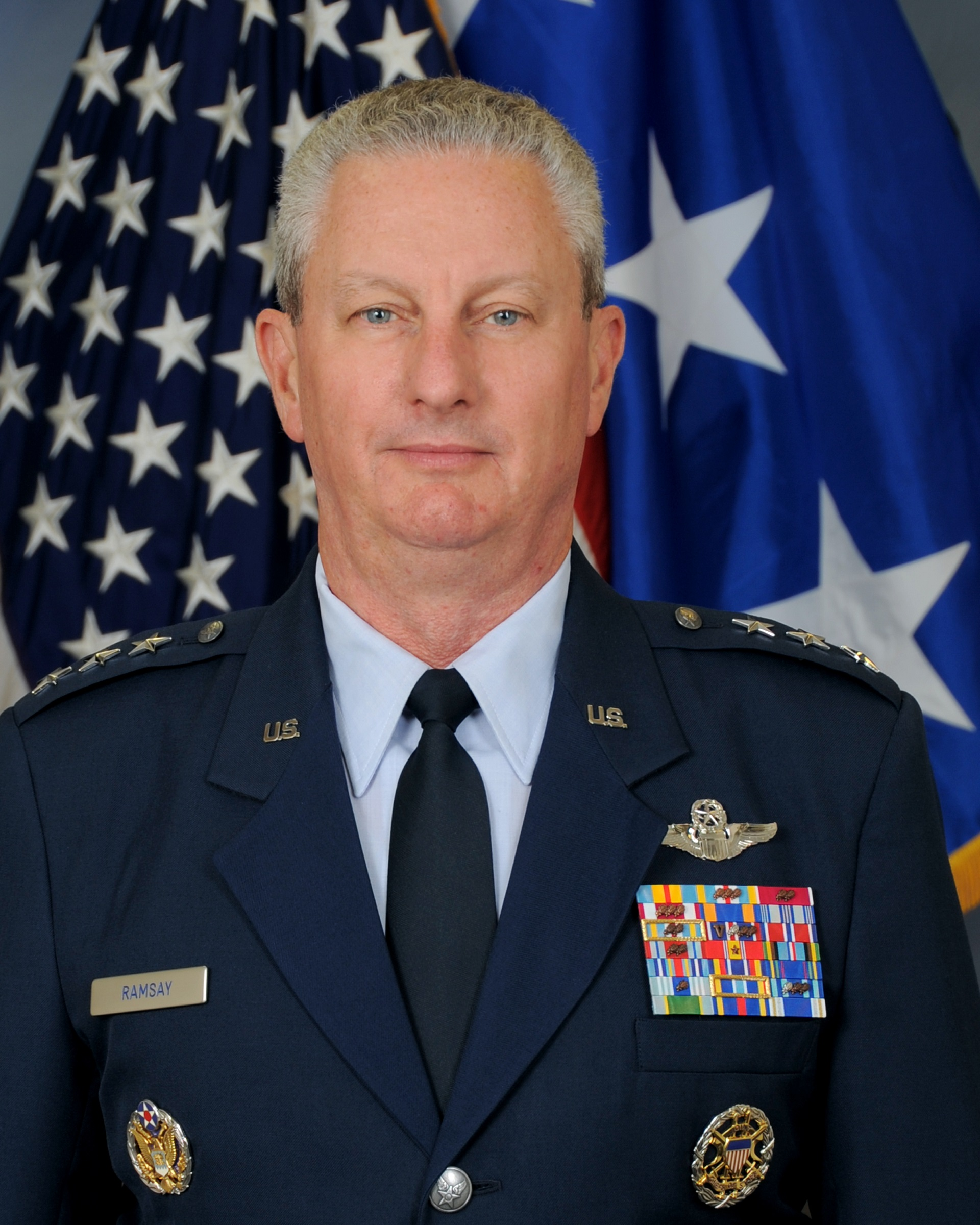
- Lieutenant General Mark F. Ramsay c. 2012
- Born: c. 1958 (age 67–68)
- Alma mater: Embry-Riddle (BS, MS); Naval War College (MA)
- Military career
- Allegiance: United States
- Branch: United States Air Force
- Service years: 1982–2015
- Rank: Lieutenant General
- Commands: 18th Air Force; 319th Air Refueling Wing; 89th Operations Group; 98th Air Refueling Squadron
- Awards: Defense Distinguished Service Medal; Defense Superior Service Medal (4); Legion of Merit (3)

Lieutenant General Mark F. Ramsay (born c. 1958) is a retired United States Air Force officer who served as the Director of Force Structure, Resources, and Assessment, on the Joint Chiefs of Staff from August 2012 to October 2015. He concurrently served as the Joint Requirements Oversight Council Secretary and as the Chairman of the Joint Capabilities Board. Prior to that, he served as the commanding general of 18th Air Force from September 2011 to August 2012.

== Military career ==
Ramsay entered the United States Air Force in 1982 as a distinguished graduate of the Officer Training School. He has commanded air refueling and expeditionary air refueling squadrons, an operations group, an air refueling wing and a numbered air force.

Ramsay's staff tours include Chief of the Programs and Mobility Division at Headquarters United States European Command and the chief of two programming divisions, Global Mobility and Program Integration, at Headquarters United States Air Force. He also served as Deputy Director of Politico-Military Affairs for Europe, NATO, Russia and Africa on the Joint Staff, and the Deputy Chief of Staff for Operations and Intelligence at Supreme Headquarters Allied Powers Europe in Casteau, Belgium.

Ramsay is a Command Pilot with over 4,900 hours of flight time. He has primarily flown the T-37 Tweet, T-38 Talon, C-9A, C-9C, C-20B, C-37A, C-40B, KC-135R, KC-135T and UH-1N aircraft.

== Education ==
- 1980 Bachelor of Science degree in aeronautical science, Embry-Riddle Aeronautical University, Fla.
- 1987 Distinguished graduate, Squadron Officer School, Maxwell Air Force Base, Ala.
- 1992 Master of Science degree in aviation management, Embry-Riddle Aeronautical University
- 1993 Air Command and Staff College, Maxwell AFB, Ala.
- 1997 Air War College, by correspondence
- 1999 Master of Arts degree in national security and strategic studies, with highest distinction, Naval War College, Newport, R.I.
- 2003 National Security Studies, Syracuse University, N.Y.
- 2009 Defense Policy Seminar, George Washington University, Washington, D.C.
- 2011 Joint Flag Officer Warfighting Course, Maxwell AFB, Ala.
- 2013 Pinnacle Course, National Defense University, Washington D.C.
- 2014 Leadership at the Peak, Center for Creative Leadership, Colorado Springs, Colo.

== Military assignments ==
1. January 1983 – December 1983, Student, undergraduate pilot training, Laughlin AFB, Texas
2. December 1983 – May 1989, C-9A Evaluator Pilot and assistant Chief of Standardization and Evaluation, 11th Aeromedical Airlift Squadron, Scott AFB, Ill.
3. May 1989 – August 1992, C-9C Instructor Pilot, assistant Chief of Wing Programs and Requirements, and Wing Executive Officer, 89th Airlift Wing, Andrews AFB, Md.
4. August 1992 – June 1993, Student, Air Command and Staff College, Maxwell AFB, Ala.
5. June 1993 – June 1995, Deputy Division Chief and Strategic Airlift Program Element Monitor, Mobility, Training and Special Operations Requirements Division, Directorate of Operational Requirements, Headquarters U. S. Air Force, Washington, D.C.
6. June 1995 – July 1998, Operations Officer and Commander, 98th Air Refueling Squadron, Fairchild AFB, Wash.
7. July 1998 – July 1999, Student, Naval War College, Newport, R.I.
8. August 1999 – July 2001, Chief, Programs and Mobility Division, Logistics and Security Assistance Directorate (ECJ4), Headquarters U.S. European Command, Stuttgart-Vaihingen, Germany
9. July 2001 – August 2003, Commander, 89th Operations Group, Andrews AFB, Md.
10. September 2003 – March 2005, Commander, 319th Air Refueling Wing, Grand Forks AFB, N.D. (October 2004 – March 2005, CENTAF Deputy Director of Mobility Forces, Southwest Asia)
11. March 2005 – February 2006, Chief, Global Mobility Division, Directorate of Programs, Deputy Chief of Staff for Strategic Plans and Programs, Headquarters U.S. Air Force, Washington, D.C.
12. February 2006 – January 2007, Chief, Program Integration Division, Directorate of Programs, Deputy Chief of Staff for Strategic Plans and Programs, Headquarters U.S. Air Force, Washington, D.C.
13. January 2007 – September 2008, Deputy Director for Politico-Military Affairs for Europe, NATO, Russia and Africa (J5), Joint Staff, the Pentagon, Washington, D.C.
14. September 2008 – October 2009, Director, Air Force Strategic Planning, Deputy Chief of Staff for Strategic Plans and Programs, Headquarters U.S. Air Force, Washington, D.C.
15. October 2009 – September 2011, Deputy Chief of Staff, Operations and Intelligence, Supreme Headquarters Allied Powers Europe, NATO, Casteau, Belgium
16. September 2011 – August 2012, Commander, 18th Air Force, Scott AFB, Ill.
17. August 2012 – present, Director, Force Structure, Resources and Assessment, Joint Staff, the Pentagon, Washington, D.C.

== Effective dates of promotion ==
- Second Lieutenant (December 22, 1982)
- First Lieutenant (December 22, 1984)
- Captain (December 22, 1986)
- Major (May 1, 1993)
- Lieutenant Colonel (January 1, 1997)
- Colonel (April 1, 2000)
- Brigadier General (May 30, 2007)
- Major General (December 4, 2009)
- Lieutenant General (September 23, 2011)

Military offices
Preceded by Larry O. Spencer	Director for Force Structure, Resources, and Assessment of the Joint Staff; 2012–2015	Succeeded by Anthony R. Ierardi
