= Charles H. Cleveland =

U.S. Army general

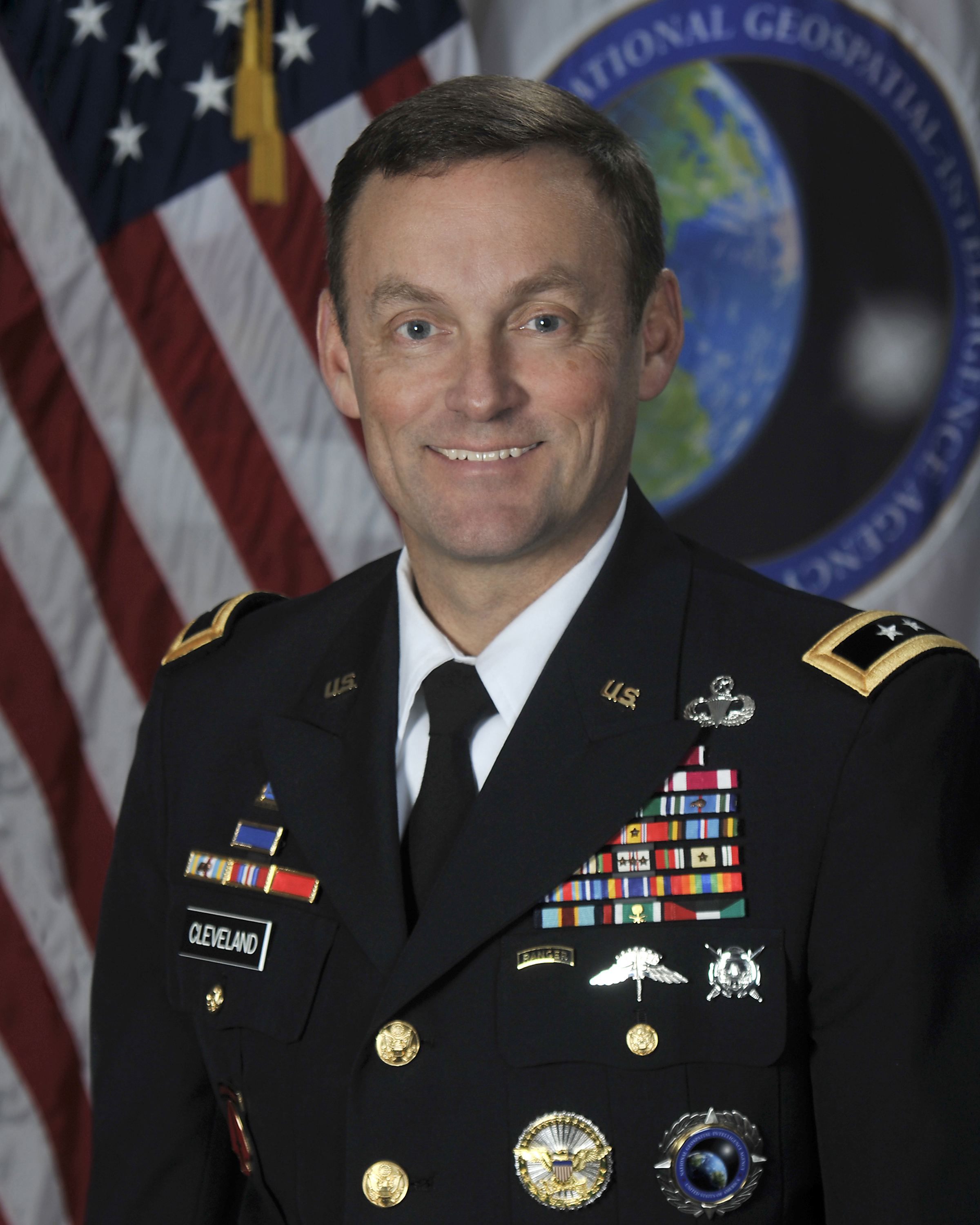
- Official portrait, 2019
- Military career
- Allegiance: United States
- Branch: United States Army
- Service years: 1989–2022
- Rank: Major General
- Conflicts: Gulf War; War in Afghanistan; Iraq War
- Awards: Defense Superior Service Medal; Legion of Merit; Bronze Star Medal

Charles H. Cleveland is a retired United States Army major general who served as the Director of Operations and Military Deputy of the National Geospatial-Intelligence Agency from January 2019 to July 2022. Previously, he served as the Vice Director for Intelligence of the Joint Staff from June 2017 to December 2018.

Military offices
Preceded by Philip D. Gentile	Senior Military Assistant to the Under Secretary of Defense for Intelligence; 2013–2016	Succeeded by James R. Cluff
Preceded by Wilson A. Shoffner Jr.	Deputy Chief of Staff for Communications of the Resolute Support Mission; 2016–2017	Succeeded by Scott E. Brower
Preceded by Raúl E. Escribano	Vice Director for Intelligence of the Joint Staff; 2017–2019	Succeeded by Michele H. Bredenkamp
Preceded by Linda R. Urrutia-Varhall	Director of Operations and Military Deputy of the National Geospatial-Intelligence Agency; 2019–2022	Succeeded by Max E. Pearson
