= Deputy Chief of Staff G-8 Programs of The United States Army =

Part of the Department of the Army Headquarters

Deputy Chief of Staff G-8 of the United States Army
- Country: United States
- Branch: Army
- Type: Headquarters, Department of the Army Staff
- Garrison/HQ: The Pentagon, Washington, D.C.

Commanders
- DCS G-8: LTG Peter N. Benchoff

United States Army Deputy Chief of Staff G-8 (DCS G-8) (Note: See the Continental Staff System for an explanation of "letter-number" designations (e.g. G-8 "Ground Staff - Finance and Contracts").) is part of the Department of the Army Headquarters (HQDA) and reports to the Chief of Staff of the United States Army (CSA) and Vice Chief of Staff of the United States Army (VCSA).

== Mission ==
The DCS G-8 is responsible for integrating Army funding, fielding, and equipping actions with the Office of the Secretary of Defense (OSD), Joint, and Army Staff (ARSTAF) organizations and processes for the purpose of meeting current and future force requirements of the Joint Force. The DCS G-8 is the principal military advisor to United States Assistant Secretary of the Army for Financial Management and Comptroller (ASA (FM&C)) and advises VCSA on Joint Requirements Oversight Council (JROC) issues as well. The DCS G-8 also serves as a member of Joint Capabilities Board (JCB), Army Requirements and Resourcing Board (AR2B), Army Requirements Oversight Council (AROC), and Army-Marine Corps Board (AMCB).

== List of Deputy Chiefs of Staff for Programs ==
No.	Deputy Chief of Staff		Term		
No.	Portrait	Name	Took office	Left office	Term length
1	Benjamin S. Griffin	Lieutenant General; Benjamin S. Griffin (born 1946)	2002	November 2004	~2 years, 305 days
2	David Melcher	Lieutenant General; David Melcher (born 1954)	November 2004	December 2006	~2 years, 30 days
3	Stephen M. Speakes	Lieutenant General; Stephen M. Speakes (born 1952)	December 2006	~November 2, 2009	~2 years, 336 days
4	Robert P. Lennox	Lieutenant General; Robert P. Lennox	November 2, 2009	~July 27, 2012	~2 years, 268 days
5	James O. Barclay III	Lieutenant General; James O. Barclay III	July 27, 2012	December 2014	~2 years, 127 days
6	Anthony R. Ierardi	Lieutenant General; Anthony R. Ierardi (born 1960)	December 2014	August 2015	~243 days
7	John M. Murray	Lieutenant General; John M. Murray (born 1959/1960)	August 2015	~August 29, 2018	~3 years, 28 days
8	James Pasquarette	Lieutenant General; James Pasquarette (born 1961)	~August 29, 2018	May 27, 2021	~2 years, 271 days
-	Krystyna M. Kolesar	Krystyna M. Kolesar; Acting	May 27, 2021	June 2, 2021	6 days
9	Erik C. Peterson	Lieutenant General; Erik C. Peterson	June 2, 2021	February 2, 2024	2 years, 245 days
10	Karl Gingrich	Lieutenant General; Karl Gingrich	February 2, 2024	January 5, 2026	1 year, 337 days
11	Peter N. Benchoff	Lieutenant General; Peter N. Benchoff	January 5, 2026	Incumbent	20 days

== See also ==
- Chief of Staff of the United States Army
- Vice Chief of Staff of the United States Army
