= Joseph Votel =

United States Army general

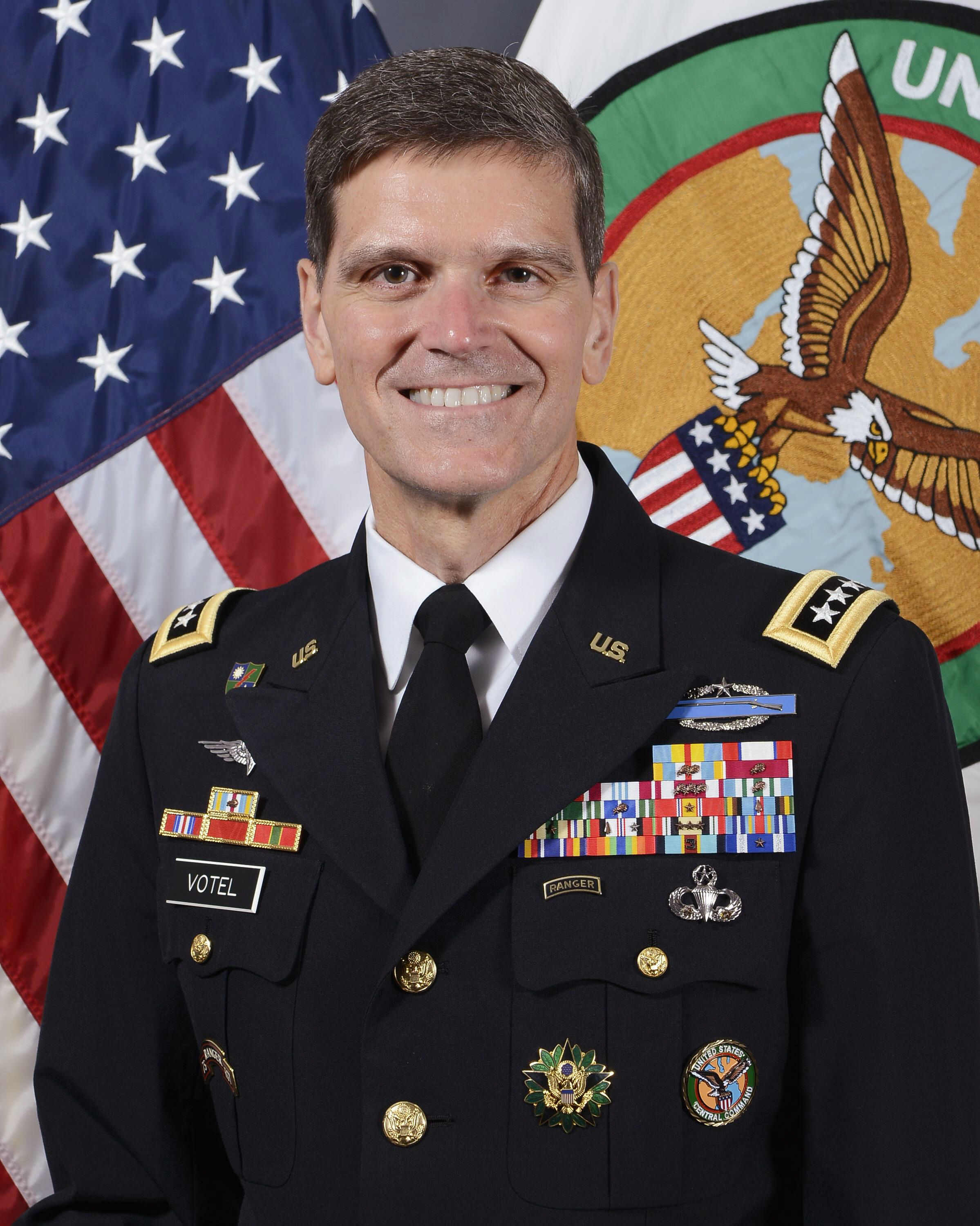
- Official portrait, 2016
- Born: 14 February 1958 (age 68); Saint Paul, Minnesota, U.S.
- Allegiance: United States
- Branch: United States Army
- Service years: 1980–2019
- Rank: General
- Commands: United States Central Command; United States Special Operations Command; Joint Special Operations Command; Combined Joint Task Force 82; Joint Improvised Explosive Device Defeat Organization; 75th Ranger Regiment; 2nd Battalion, 22nd Infantry, 10th Mountain Division
- Conflicts: War in Afghanistan; Iraq War
- Awards: Defense Distinguished Service Medal (3); Army Distinguished Service Medal; Defense Superior Service Medal (3); Legion of Merit (2); Bronze Star (4)
- Education: United States Military Academy (BS); United States Army Command and General Staff College (MS); United States Army War College (MS)

Joseph Leonard Votel (born 14 February 1958) is a retired four-star general in the United States Army who was commander of United States Central Command from March 2016 to March 2019. Before that, he served as commander of the United States Special Operations Command.

Votel most recently served as president and CEO of Business Executives for National Security (BENS) – a national, nonprofit composed of senior business and industry executives who volunteer their time and expertise to assist the U.S. national security community.

== Early life and education ==
Born on 14 February 1958, in Saint Paul, Minnesota, Votel attended the United States Military Academy and was commissioned in 1980 as an Army Infantry officer.

His military schools include Infantry Officer Basic and Advanced Courses, United States Army Command and General Staff College, and the United States Army War College.

== Military career ==
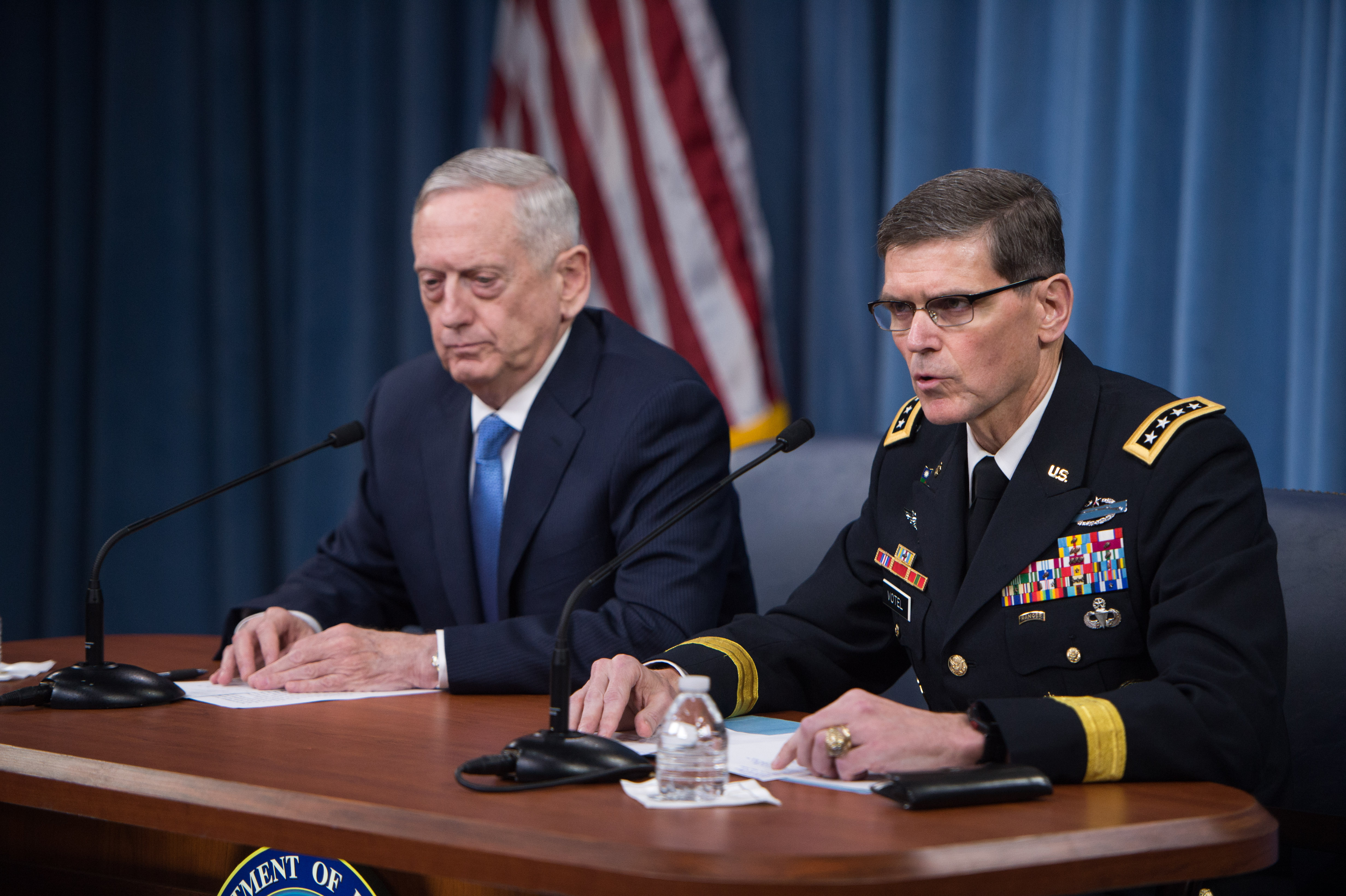
Votel with Secretary of Defense James Mattis who was Votel's predecessor as Commander of U.S. Central Command at the Pentagon, 11 April 2017.

Votel's initial assignments were to the 3rd Infantry Division in Germany, where he served as a rifle platoon leader, executive officer, battalion adjutant, and rifle company commander. Following this tour, he was assigned to Headquarters, Allied Forces Southern Europe – Naples, Italy, and the NATO Peace Implementation Force (IFOR) in Sarajevo. He commanded the 2nd Battalion, 22nd Infantry (Light) at Fort Drum, New York, and afterward commanded the 1st Ranger Battalion. Later he commanded the 75th Ranger Regiment during Operation Enduring Freedom. On 19 October 2001, Votel led 200 Rangers from 3rd Battalion, who parachuted towards an airfield south of Kandahar in an operation known as Operation Rhino and attacked several Taliban targets.

As a general officer, Votel served in the Pentagon as the director of the Army and Joint Improvised Explosive Device (IED) Defeat Task Force and subsequently as the deputy director of the Joint Improvised Explosive Device Defeat Organization established under the Deputy Secretary of Defense. He also served as the Deputy Commanding General (Operations), 82nd Airborne Division / CJTF-82, Operation Enduring Freedom, Afghanistan, and was subsequently assigned as the Deputy Commanding General of the Joint Special Operations Command, Fort Bragg. He next served as the Commanding General of the Joint Special Operations Command.

=== USSOCOM and USCENTCOM Commander ===
On 24 June 2014, Votel was nominated by President Barack Obama to succeed Admiral William H. McRaven as the 10th Commander of United States Special Operations Command. The appointment was confirmed by Congress in July, and the change of command took place on 28 August. Lieutenant General Raymond A. Thomas replaced Votel as commander of Joint Special Operations Command.

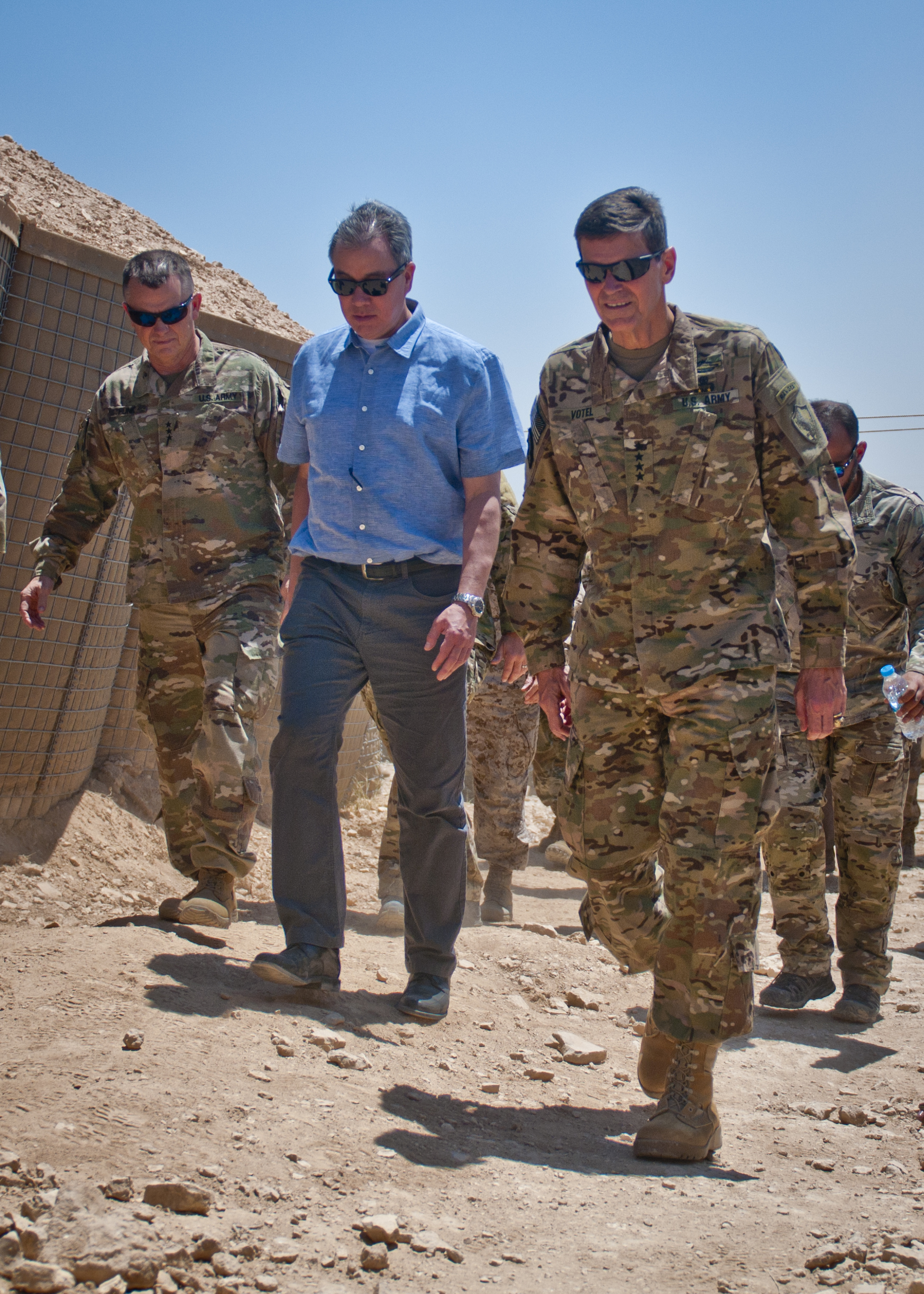
Votel (right) visiting Manbij, Syria as CENTCOM commander, 21 June 2018

Votel became the commander of United States Central Command (USCENTCOM) on 30 March 2016. On 23 April 2018, Votel made his first official visit to Israel as CENTCOM commander. During his visit, Votel was scheduled to meet with Israeli Defense Force Chief of Staff, Gadi Eisenkot, National Security Adviser Meir Ben-Shabbat, and other senior defense officials.

As CENTCOM commander, Votel oversaw the United States' continued war on terrorism in the Middle East, particularly the Combined Joint Task Force – Operation Inherent Resolve's fight against the Islamic State in Iraq and the Levant terror organization, which rose to prominence in 2014. The fight against the group saw CENTCOM become more involved in the Syrian civil war and Iraqi Civil War.

After nearly 40 years of military service, Votel officially retired on 28 March 2019, five days after the decisive Battle of Baghuz Fawqani, which saw the territorial collapse of the Islamic State in Syria. He was succeeded as CENTCOM commander by General Kenneth McKenzie, USMC.

==== 2016 Turkey coup attempt ====
In a speech on 29 July 2016, Turkish President Erdoğan accused Votel of "siding with coup plotters", after Votel accused the Turkish government of arresting the Pentagon's contacts in Turkey.

== Post-military career ==
Votel has served as the president and CEO of Business Executives for National Security (BENS). He also serves as a non-resident senior fellow at the Belfer Center for Science and International Affairs, strategic advisor to aerospace manufacturer Sierra Nevada Corporation, and member of the board of trustees of Noblis.

== Awards and decorations ==
Combat Infantryman Badge with Star (denoting 2nd award)
Ranger Tab
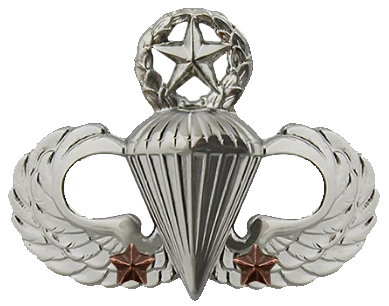
Master Parachutist Badge with 2 Combat Jump Devices
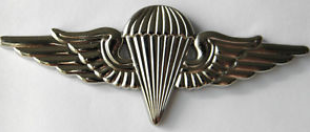
Egyptian Parachutist Badge
Army Staff Identification Badge
United States Central Command Badge
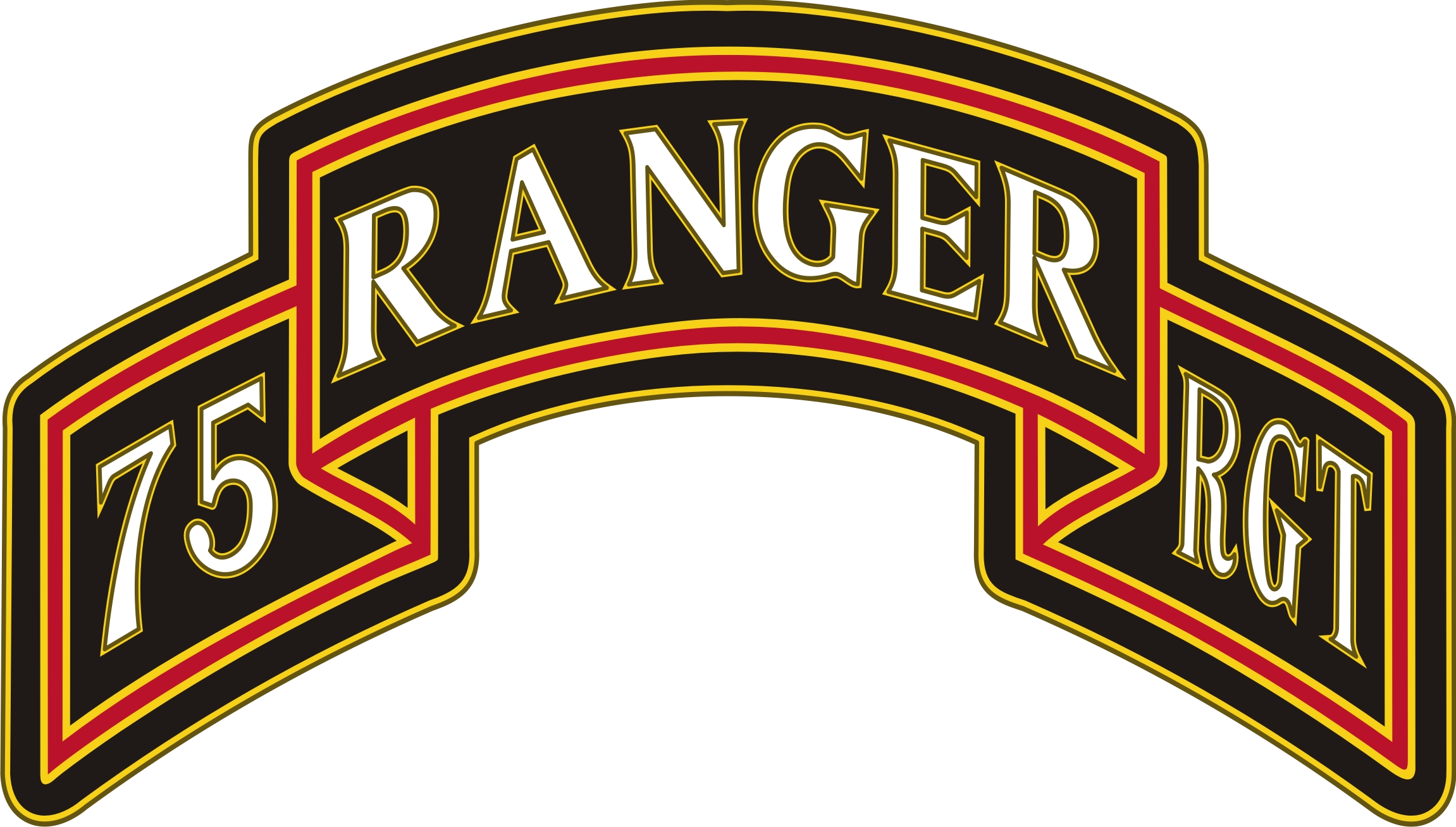
75th Ranger Regiment Combat Service Identification Badge
75th Ranger Regiment Distinctive Unit Insignia
8 Overseas Service Bars

Defense Distinguished Service Medal with two bronze oak leaf clusters
Army Distinguished Service Medal
Defense Superior Service Medal with two Oak Leaf Clusters
Legion of Merit with oak leaf cluster
Bronze Star Medal with three oak leaf clusters
Defense Meritorious Service Medal
Meritorious Service Medal with three oak leaf clusters
Joint Service Commendation Medal with Oak Leaf Cluster
Army Commendation Medal
Army Achievement Medal with Oak Leaf Cluster
Joint Meritorious Unit Award with Oak Leaf Cluster
Valorous Unit Award
Army Meritorious Unit Commendation
Superior Unit Award
National Defense Service Medal with one bronze service star
Armed Forces Expeditionary Medal with Arrowhead device
Southwest Asia Service Medal with bronze Service Star
Afghanistan Campaign Medal with Arrowhead Device and silver Campaign Star
Iraq Campaign Medal with three Campaign Stars
Global War on Terrorism Expeditionary Medal
Global War on Terrorism Service Medal
Army Service Ribbon
Army Overseas Service Ribbon with bronze award numeral 3
NATO Medal for service with ISAF with bronze Service Star

Military offices
Preceded by Ken Keen	Commander of the 75th Ranger Regiment; 2001–2003	Succeeded by James C. Nixon
Preceded by William H. McRaven	Commander of Joint Special Operations Command; 2011–2014	Succeeded by Raymond A. Thomas III
Preceded by William H. McRaven	Commander of United States Special Operations Command; 2014–2016	Succeeded by Raymond A. Thomas III
Preceded by Lloyd J. Austin III	Commander of United States Central Command; 2016–2019	Succeeded by Kenneth F. McKenzie Jr.
