= Anthony R. Ierardi =

United States Army general

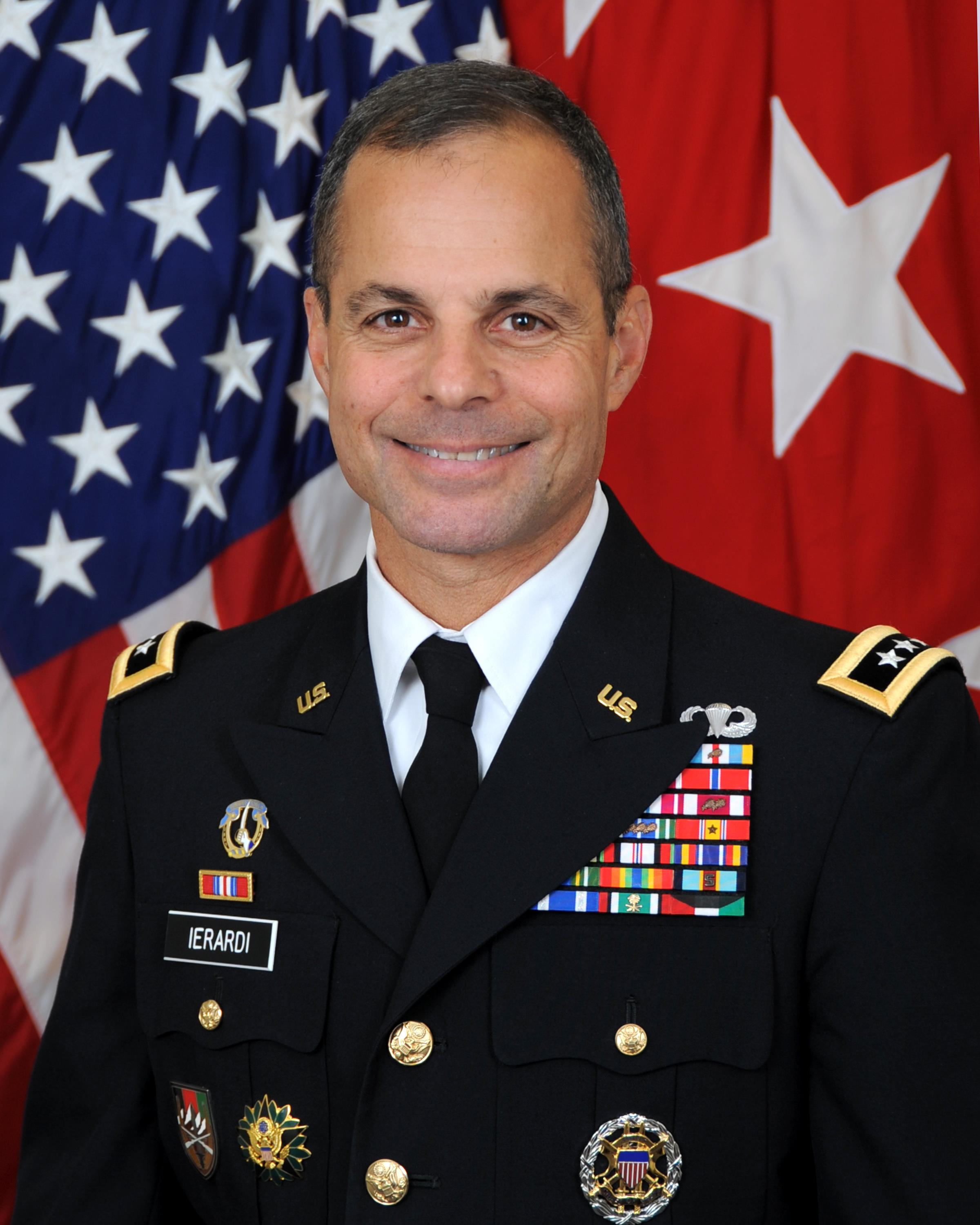
- Born: November 13, 1960 (age 65)
- Military career
- Allegiance: United States
- Branch: United States Army
- Service years: 1982–2019
- Rank: Lieutenant general
- Commands: 1st Cavalry Division
- Conflicts: Gulf War; War in Afghanistan
- Awards: Defense Superior Service Medal (2); Legion of Merit; Bronze Star Medal

Anthony Robert Ierardi (born November 13, 1960) retired from military service as a United States Army lieutenant general on 1 August 2019. Over the course of his career, he served in a uniquely diverse set of Army and Joint command and staff assignments in operational and institutional units and organizations. Ierardi's concluding assignment was as the Joint Staff's Director for Force Structure, Resources, Assessments, J-8. Previously, he served as the Deputy Chief of Staff G-8 of the United States Army, and commanded the 1st Cavalry Division at Fort Hood Texas. He attended Washington and Lee University and Georgetown University and holds business administration and Master of Arts degrees.

Military offices
New title	Deputy Chief of Staff for Programs of the United States Army; 2014–2015	Succeeded by James Pasquarette
Preceded by Mark F. Ramsay	Director for Force Structure, Resources, and Assessment of the Joint Staff; 2015–2019	Succeeded by Ronald A. Boxall
