= Raymond A. Thomas =

U.S. Army general

Raymond A. Thomas III
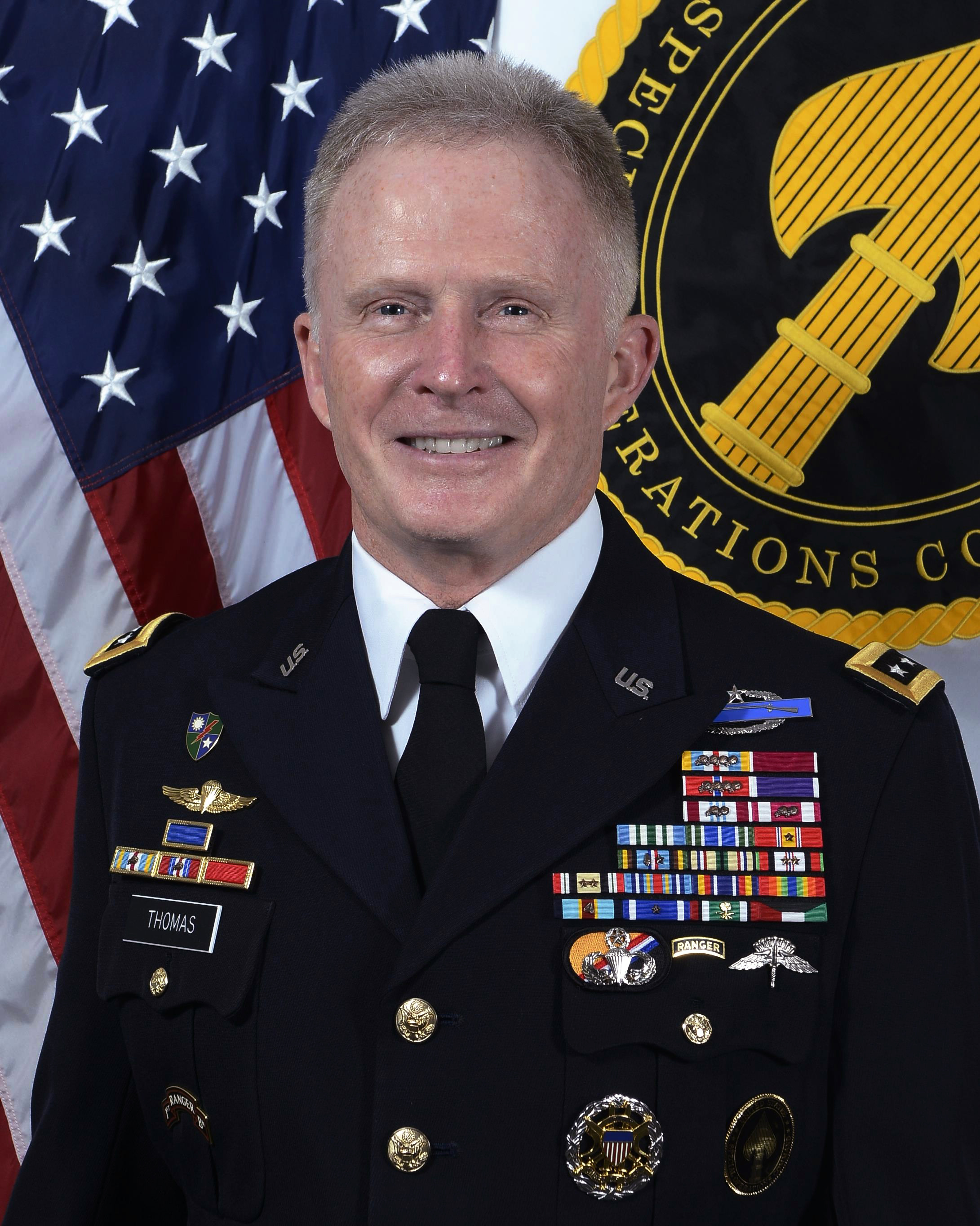
- Official portrait, 2016
- Born: 6 October 1959 (age 67); Philadelphia, Pennsylvania, United States
- Military career
- Allegiance: United States
- Branch: United States Army
- Service years: 1980–2019
- Rank: General
- Units: 1st Battalion, 75th Ranger Regiment, Delta Force
- Commands: United States Special Operations Command; Joint Special Operations Command; Associate Directorate for Military Affairs, Central Intelligence Agency; 1st Ranger Battalion
- Conflicts: Operation Urgent Fury; Operation Just Cause; Gulf War; Iraq War; War in Afghanistan
- Awards: Defense Distinguished Service Medal (2); Defense Superior Service Medal (5); Legion of Merit; Bronze Star Medal (5); Purple Heart

General Raymond Anthony Thomas III (also known as Tony Thomas; born 6 October 1958) is a retired general officer of the United States Army and former commander of the United States Special Operations Command.

He participated in numerous combat operations during his career, such as Operation Urgent Fury 1983, Operation Just Cause in 1989, Gulf War in 1991, and since 2001 the wars in Iraq and Afghanistan. Every year between 2001 and 2013 (minus his time in Iraq with the 1st Armored Division in 2007), Thomas deployed to Afghanistan as part of various special operations units.

== Military career ==
Thomas was born in Pennsylvania on 6 October 1958, and graduated from the United States Military Academy in 1980. Thomas was a member of the 75th Ranger Regiment. He led a Ranger Rifle platoon from A Company, 2nd Ranger Battalion during the Invasion of Grenada in 1983, that was dropped from an MC-130 onto a landing strip in Grenada. After completion of Infantry Officer Advanced Course in early 1986, he was assigned as Assistant S-3, Plans/Liaison Officer with 75th Ranger Regiment at Fort Benning, Georgia until 1987. Thomas was then assigned as a company commander with 3rd Ranger Battalion. In 1989, during the Invasion of Panama, he led his Ranger Rifle Company in another combat jump.

In 1992, Thomas volunteered for and completed a specialized selection course for assignment to 1st Special Forces Operational Detachment-Delta, also known as Delta Force. He served as Operations Officer, Troop Commander, Executive Officer and B Squadron Commander from 1992 to 1994 and 1996 to 1999. In June 1995 Thomas earned a master's degree from the Naval Command and Staff College in Newport, Rhode Island, followed by assignment as Executive Officer, 2nd Ranger Battalion from June 1995 to July 1996. From 2000 to 2002, he served as commanding officer of the 1st Ranger Battalion, 75th Ranger Regiment.

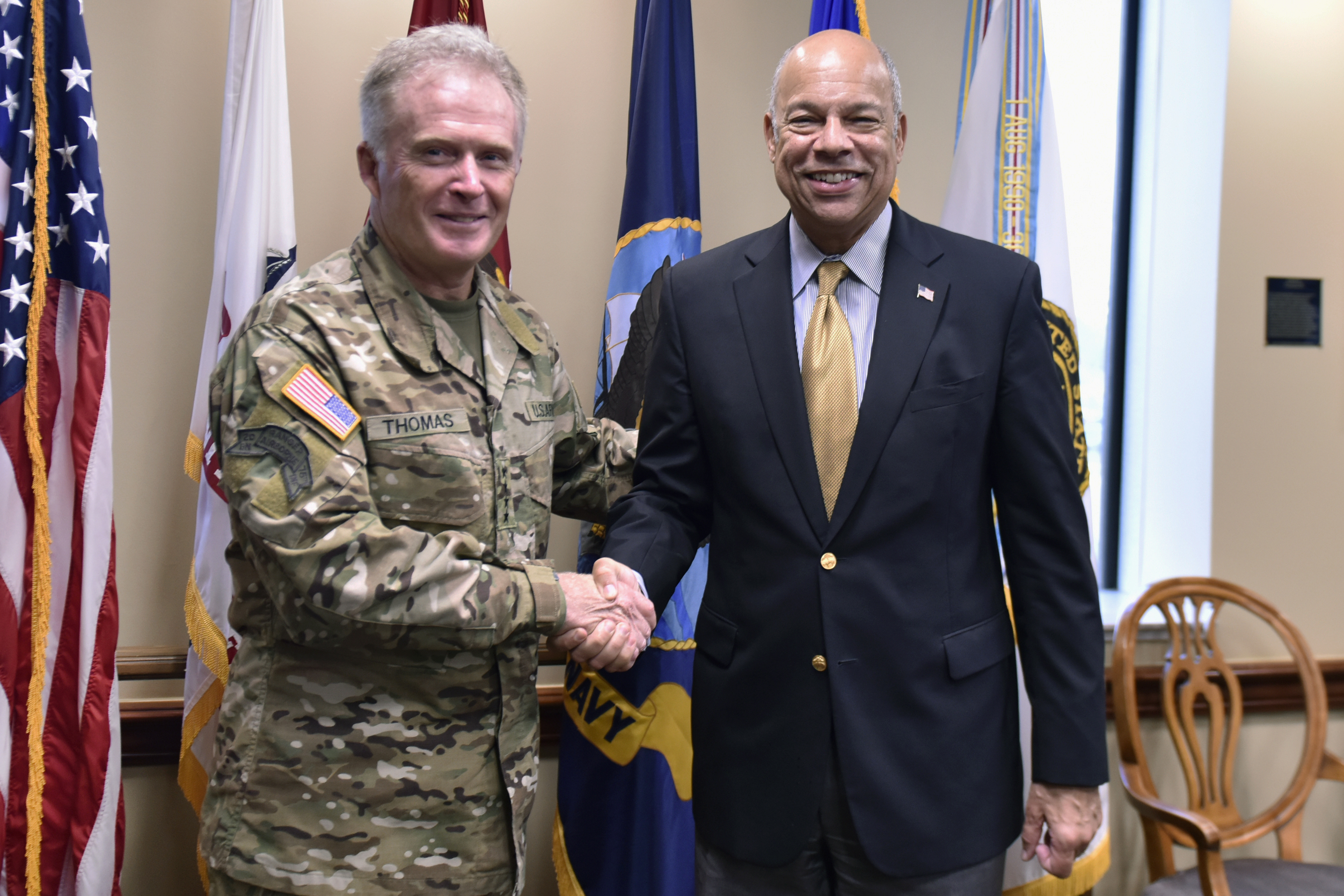
Thomas meets with Secretary of Homeland Security Jeh Johnson at MacDill Air Force Base in Tampa, Florida, 29 September 2016

Thomas crossed over from the special operations realm into the conventional warfare realm when he was selected by Lieutenant General Mark P. Hertling, then-commander of the 1st Armored Division, to be his deputy commander during the Iraq War, from 2007 to 2008. During that tour the division worked alongside Arabs and Kurds and despite the difficult relationship between the ethnic groups Thomas was praised by Hertling for "his ability to quickly fuse intelligence" adding, "He helped us fight better." After his tenure in the 1st Armored Division came to an end Thomas returned to special operations. From 2010 until 2012 Thomas served as the deputy commander of Joint Special Operations Command. As a major general, Thomas was in charge of all United States and NATO special forces in Afghanistan from 2012 until 2013. Every year between 2001 and 2013 (minus his time in Iraq with the 1st Armored Division in 2007) Thomas deployed to Afghanistan as part of various special operations units.

After commanding special forces units in Afghanistan, Thomas was promoted to lieutenant general and was reassigned to CIA headquarters in Langley, Virginia where he served as the Associate Director of the Central Intelligence Agency for Military Affairs. In August 2014, Thomas replaced Joseph Votel as the commander of Joint Special Operations Command. Votel was promoted to four-star general and replaced Admiral William H. McRaven as the commander of United States Special Operations Command (USSOCOM). In a ceremony at MacDill Air Force Base, Florida, on 30 March 2016, Thomas took command of USSOCOM and received his fourth star. General Thomas retired from active duty on 29 March 2019.

Thomas currently resides in the Tampa Bay area and was honored prior to Game 5 of the 2021 Stanley Cup Finals.

== Dates of rank ==
Rank	Date
General	17 March 2016
Lieutenant general	22 May 2014
Major general	10 November 2011
Brigadier general	16 June 2008
Colonel	1 June 2002
Lieutenant colonel	1 March 1997
Major	1 April 1992
Captain	1 February 1984
First lieutenant	28 November 1981
Second lieutenant	28 May 1980

== Awards and decorations ==
Combat Infantryman Badge with Star (denoting 2nd award)
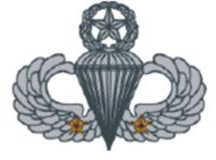
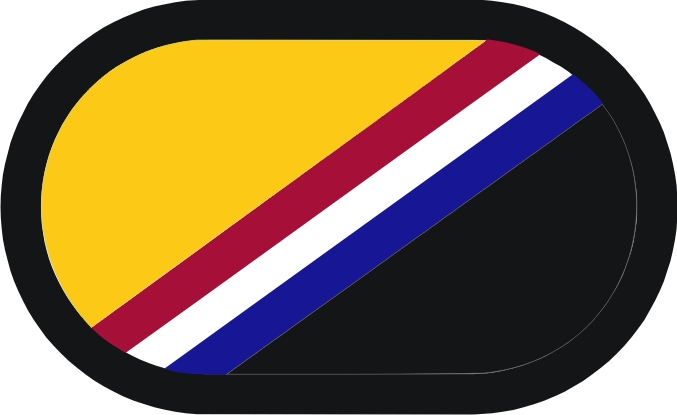
Master Parachutist Badge with 2 jump stars and USSOCOM background trimming
Ranger Tab
Military Free Fall Parachutist Badge
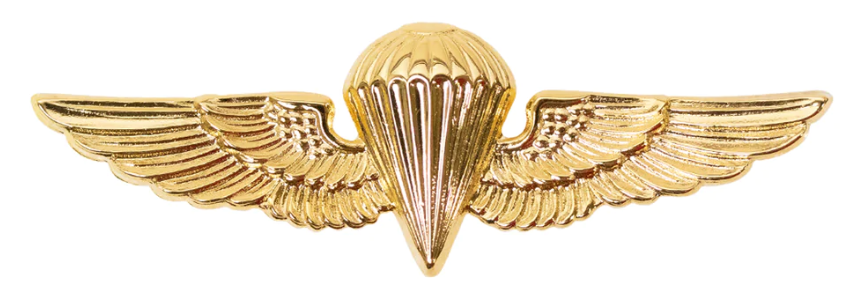
Honduran Parachutist Badge
Joint Chiefs of Staff Identification Badge
United States Special Operations Command Badge
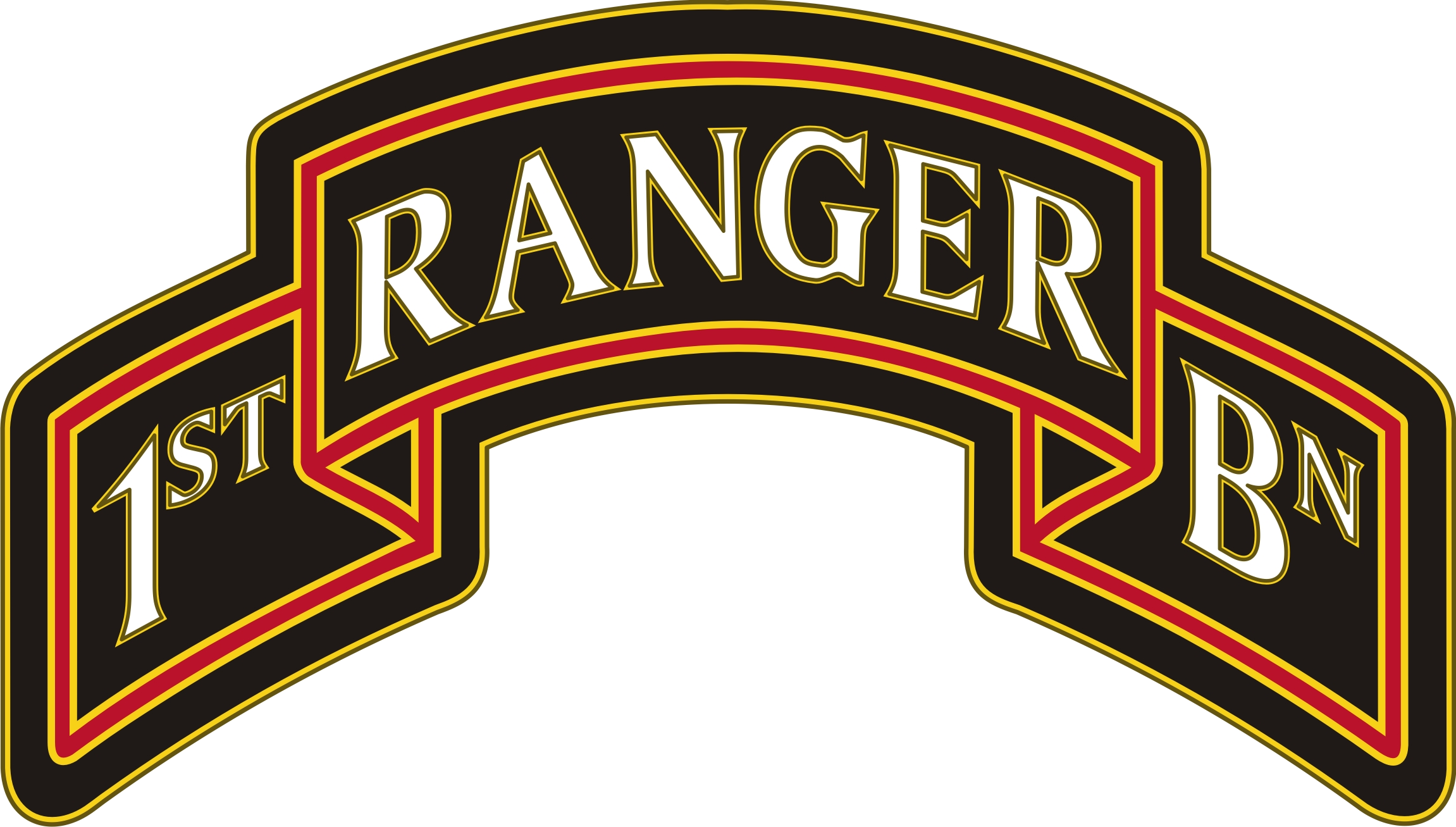
1st Battalion, 75th Ranger Regiment Combat Service Identification Badge
75th Ranger Regiment Distinctive Unit Insignia
13 Overseas Service Bars

Defense Distinguished Service Medal with one bronze oak leaf cluster
Defense Superior Service Medal with four oak leaf clusters
Legion of Merit
Bronze Star Medal with four oak leaf clusters
Purple Heart
Defense Meritorious Service Medal with two oak leaf clusters
Meritorious Service Medal with two oak leaf clusters
Joint Service Commendation Medal
Army Achievement Medal
Army Presidential Unit Citation
Joint Meritorious Unit Award with oak leaf cluster
Valorous Unit Award with oak leaf cluster
Meritorious Unit Commendation
National Defense Service Medal with one bronze service star
Armed Forces Expeditionary Medal with Arrowhead Device and service star
Southwest Asia Service Medal
Afghanistan Campaign Medal with two service stars
Iraq Campaign Medal with two service stars
Global War on Terrorism Expeditionary Medal
Global War on Terrorism Service Medal
Army Service Ribbon
Army Overseas Service Ribbon with bronze award numeral 4
NATO Medal for the former Yugoslavia with service star
Kuwait Liberation Medal (Saudi Arabia)
Kuwait Liberation Medal (Kuwait)

Military offices
Preceded by Joseph Votel	Commander, Joint Special Operations Command; 2014–2016	Succeeded by Austin S. Miller
Preceded by Joseph Votel	Commander, United States Special Operations Command; 2016–2019	Succeeded by Richard D. Clarke
