= Michael L. Downs =

U.S. Air Force general

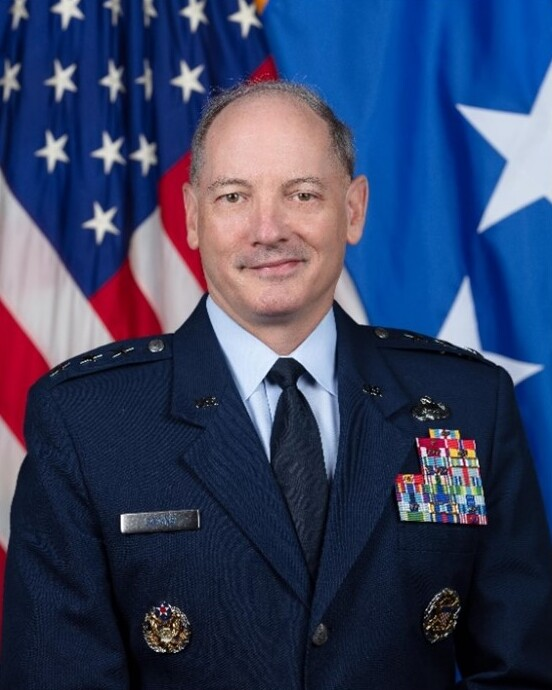
- Military career
- Allegiance: United States
- Branch: United States Air Force
- Service years: 1993–present
- Rank: Lieutenant General
- Commands: Associate Directorate for Military Affairs, Central Intelligence Agency; 17th Training Wing; 707th Intelligence, Surveillance, Reconnaissance Group; 303rd Intelligence Squadron
- Awards: Defense Superior Service Medal (2); Legion of Merit (2); Bronze Star Medal

Michael L. Downs is a United States Air Force lieutenant general who has served as the associate director for military affairs of the Central Intelligence Agency since December 2, 2024. He most recently served as the vice director of the Joint Staff. He previously served as the deputy director, intelligence, surveillance and reconnaissance operations of the Joint Staff.

In July 2024, Downs was nominated and confirmed for promotion to lieutenant general and assignment as associate director for military affairs of the Central Intelligence Agency.

Military offices
Preceded by John T. Rauch	Director of Future Warfare of the United States Air Force; 2017–2018	Succeeded by Leah G. Lauderback
Preceded by Raul Escribano	Director of Intelligence of the United States Forces Korea; 2018–2020	Succeeded by Michele Bredenkamp
Preceded by Michele Bredenkamp	Vice Director of Intelligence of the Joint Staff; 2020–2021	Succeeded by Ralph R. Smith III
Preceded by Julian Cheater	Deputy Director of Intelligence, Surveillance and Reconnaissance Operations of the Joint Staff; 2021–2023	Succeeded by Larry R. Broadwell Jr.
Preceded by George Wikoff	Vice Director of the Joint Staff; 2023–2024	Succeeded by Stephen E. Liszewski
Preceded by John D. Caine	Associate Director for Military Affairs of the Central Intelligence Agency; 2024–present	Incumbent
