= Stephen M. Speakes =

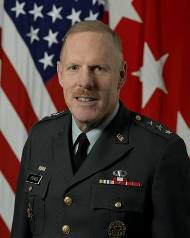
- Born: May 21, 1952 (age 74); Mexico
- Military career
- Allegiance: United States
- Branch: United States Army
- Service years: 1974–2009
- Rank: Lieutenant General
- Commands: 2nd Brigade, 1st Cavalry Division
- Conflicts: Iraq War
- Awards: Army Distinguished Service Medal; Defense Superior Service Medal; Legion of Merit (6); Bronze Star Medal

Stephen Manning Speakes (born May 21, 1952) is a retired lieutenant general of the United States Army, now serving as the president and CEO of Independent Rough Terrain Center (IRTC), LLC. The company makes rough-terrain material-handling equipment for the military and commercial markets. As the CEO since 2013, Speakes has focused on emphasizing customer relationships, expanding into the commercial marketplace while improving quality and efficiency.

Prior to joining IRTC, Speakes was an executive vice president at USAA from 2010 to 2013, responsible for enterprise strategy, and external affairs. Speakes's final assignment in a 35-year army career was as the Deputy Chief of Staff G-8 Programs of The United States Army. In that role Speakes was responsible for developing and presenting the army's financial strategy to the Executive Branch and to Congress. He was also charged with equipping the army during a time of wartime operations when demand for new force protection capabilities required innovative and adaptive solutions. Previously, Speakes served in a wide variety of command and staff assignments in the US, Germany, Iraq and Kuwait. He is married to Judy, a retired physician assistant, and is a father.
