= John Ulrich =

U.S. Army general

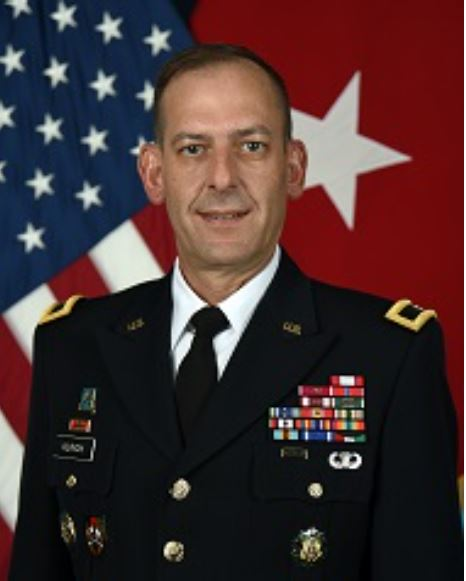
- Military career
- Allegiance: United States
- Branch: United States Army
- Service years: 19XX–present
- Rank: Brigadier General
- Commands: United States Army Operational Test Command

John C. Ulrich is a United States Army brigadier general who most recently served as the Director of Capability and Resource Integration of the United States Cyber Command since June 19 to July 2021. Previously, he served as the Director of Force Development of the United States Army.

Military offices
Preceded by Kenneth L. Kamper	Commanding General of the United States Army Operational Test Command; 2015–2018	Succeeded by William D. Taylor
Preceded by John A. George	Director of Force Development of the United States Army; 2018–2019	Succeeded by Erik C. Peterson
Preceded by Karl H. Gingrich	Director of Capability and Resource Integration of the United States Cyber Command; 2019–2021	Succeeded by Christopher R. Reid
