= Karl Gingrich =

U.S. Army general

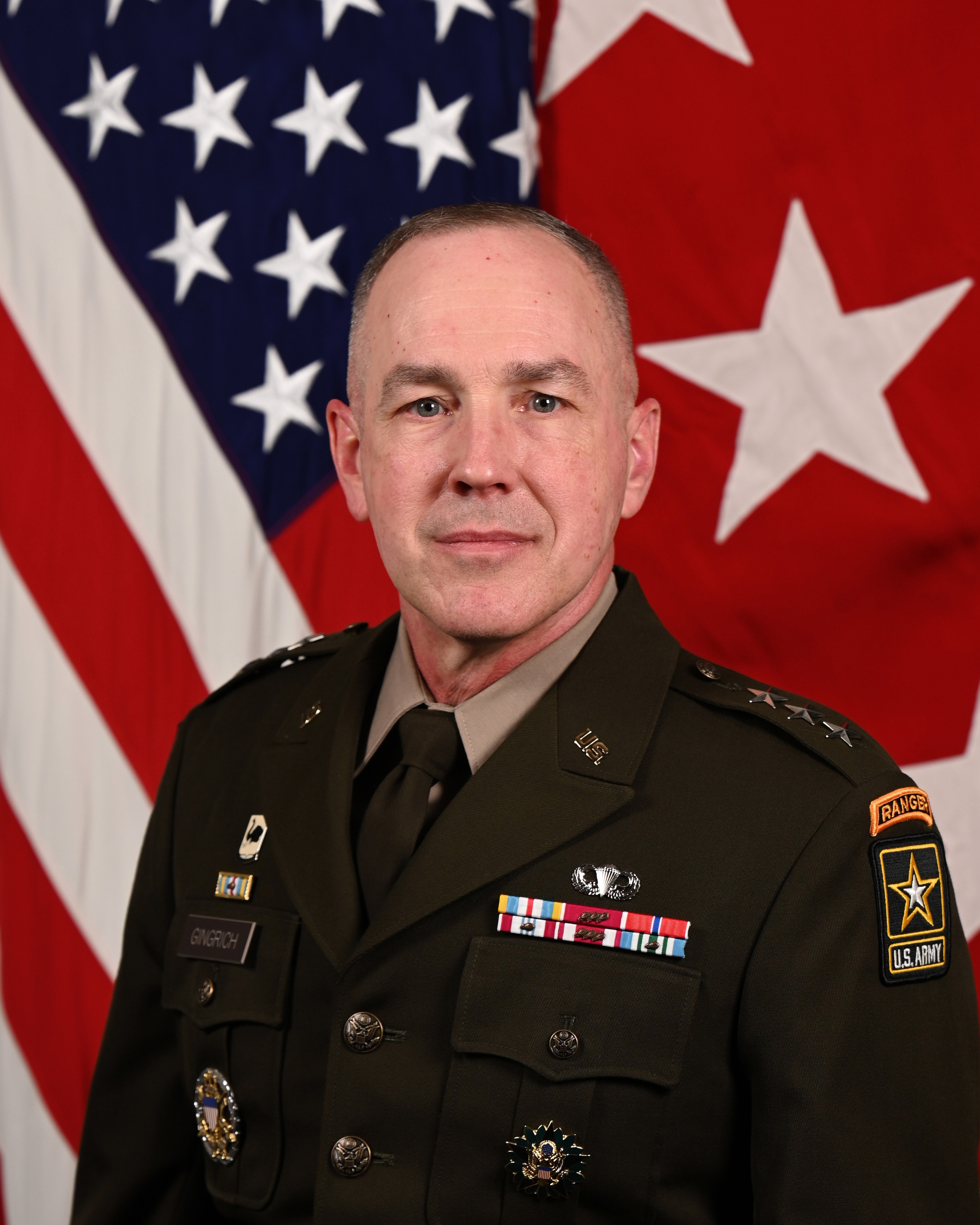
- Official portrait, 2024
- Military career
- Allegiance: United States
- Branch: United States Army
- Rank: Lieutenant General
- Awards: Defense Superior Service Medal; Legion of Merit (4); Bronze Star Medal

Karl H. Gingrich is a United States Army lieutenant general who has served as the deputy chief of staff for programs of the United States Army since February 2024. He most recently served as director of program analysis and evaluation of the Army Staff from 2019 to 2024. He previously served as the director of capability and resource integration of the United States Cyber Command.

In January 2023, Gingrich was nominated for promotion to lieutenant general. He was confirmed by the Senate to serve as the Deputy Chief of Staff, G-8 in December 2023.

Military offices
Preceded by Kenneth D. Hubbard	Director of Capability and Resource Integration of the United States Cyber Command; 2017–2019	Succeeded by John C. Ulrich
Preceded by John Ferrari	Director of Program Analysis and Evaluation of the United States Army; 2019–2024	Succeeded by Peter N. Benchoff
Preceded by Erik C. Peterson	Deputy Chief of Staff for Programs of the United States Army; 2024–present	Incumbent
