= Stephen Jost =

U.S. Air Force general

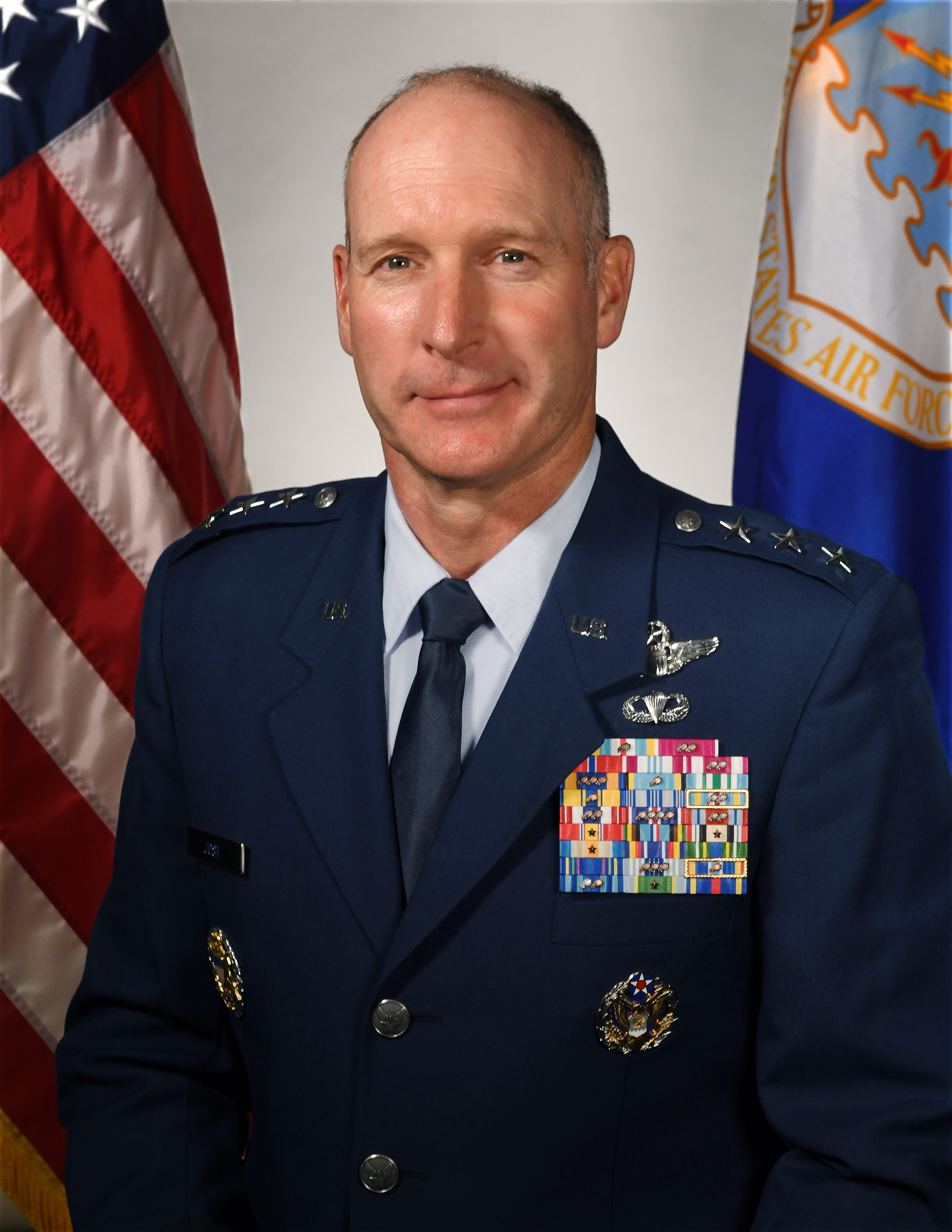
- Official portrait, 2024
- Born: c. 1972 (age 53–54); San Antonio, Texas, U.S.
- Military career
- Allegiance: United States
- Branch: United States Air Force
- Service years: 1994–present
- Rank: Lieutenant General
- Commands: United States Forces Japan; Joint Enabling Capabilities Command; 20th Fighter Wing; 33rd Operations Group; 332nd Expeditionary Operations Support Squadron
- Awards: Defense Superior Service Medal (2); Legion of Merit (3)

Stephen Fraser Jost (born c. 1972) is a United States Air Force lieutenant general who has served as the commander of United States Forces Japan since 8 October 2024. He most recently served as the commander of the Joint Enabling Capabilities Command from 2022 to 2024. He previously served as the deputy director for joint strategic planning at the Joint Staff from 2020 to 2022. He also served as director of the Air Force F-35 Integration Office from 2017 to 2018.

While serving as the 20th Fighter Wing commander, Jost relieved his vice commander, Colonel William Jones, after the latter was charged with possession of child pornography and obstruction of justice.

In May 2022, Jost was nominated for promotion to major general. In March 2024, he was nominated for promotion to lieutenant general and commander of United States Forces Japan and the Fifth Air Force.

Military offices
Preceded by Clay Hall	Commander of the 20th Fighter Wing; 2014–2016	Succeeded by Daniel T. Lasica
Preceded by Todd D. Canterbury	Director of the F-35 Integration Office of the United States Air Force; 2017–2018	Succeeded by David W. Abba
Preceded by Xavier Brunson	Chief of Staff of Combined Joint Task Force – Operation Inherent Resolve; 2018–2019	Succeeded by Christopher J. Niemi
Preceded by Charles R. Miller	Deputy Director for Joint Strategic Planning of the Joint Staff; 2020–2022	Succeeded by Anthony M. Henderson
Preceded by Paul Spedero Jr.	Commander of the Joint Enabling Capabilities Command; 2022–2024	Succeeded by Michael E. McWilliams
Preceded by Ricky Rupp	Commander of the Fifth Air Force; 2024–2026	Succeeded by Joel Carey
Preceded by Ricky Rupp	Commander of United States Forces Japan; 2024–present	Incumbent
