= Charles R. Miller (general) =

U.S. Army general

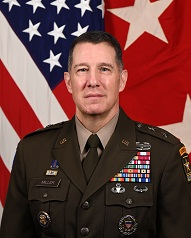
- Official portrait, 2024
- Born: November 17, 1967 (age 58); Staunton, Virginia, U.S.
- Military career
- Allegiance: United States
- Branch: United States Army
- Service years: 1990–2024
- Rank: Major General
- Conflicts: Iraq War; Operation Inherent Resolve
- Awards: Distinguished Service Medal; Defense Superior Service Medal (5); Legion of Merit; Bronze Star Medal (2)
- Other work: Senior Advisor with Kearney, Abu Dhabi, UAE

Charles Russell "Charlie" Miller (born November 17, 1967) is a retired United States Army major general who last served as Director, Strategy, Plans and Policy of the Army Staff from July 2022 to July 2024. He served as the Director for Plans, Policy, Strategy, and Capabilities of the U.S. European Command from July 2020 to June 2022. Prior to that, he served in two general officer billets as the deputy director of Joint Strategic Planning, Strategy, Plans, and Policy of the Joint Staff from July 2019 to July 2020 and as the Deputy Director of Strategy, Plans, and Policy at U.S. Central Command from October 2017 to June 2019, after a stint in Combined Joint Task Force-OIR during the Defeat ISIS campaign.

== Education ==
Born in Staunton, Virginia and raised in the Shenandoah Valley, Miller earned a Bachelor of Science degree from the United States Military Academy in 1990. He later continued his education at the School of International and Public Affairs and the Graduate School of Arts and Sciences at Columbia University while serving as an instructor, and briefly as an assistant professor of political science, at the United States Military Academy. Miller received a Master of International Affairs degree focusing on international security policy and Latin America in 1999, a Master of Philosophy degree in international relations and American politics in 2000 and a Doctor of Philosophy degree in international relations and American politics in 2002. His doctoral thesis was entitled "Serving Two Masters: Doctrinal Evolution in the 20th Century US Army". His thesis advisors were Robert Jervis and Richard Betts.

== Military career ==
From 2005 to 2007, Miller served as a strategic planner on the Joint Staff. Respected as an analyst, he was sought out by more senior officers like General David Petraeus for advice. From 2007 to 2008, he served as a deputy director on Petraeus' staff in Iraq.

From 2008 to 2009, Miller served as a senior advisor to Chairman of the Joint Chiefs of Staff Michael Mullen. From 2009 to 2011, he served on the U.S. National Security Council as Director for Iraq. Miller was one of the first fellows at the Center for International Security and Cooperation (CISAC) at Stanford University. He later worked as a senior advisor to Chairmen of the Joint Chiefs of Staff Martin Dempsey and Joseph Dunford.

In January 2022, Miller was reassigned to the Army Staff as the Director, Strategy, Plans and Policy, replacing Major General Bradley Gericke.

Military offices
Preceded by Bradley T. Gericke	Deputy Director of Strategy, Plans, and Policy of the United States Central Command; 2017–2019	Succeeded by Gregory K. Anderson
Preceded by Bradley T. Gericke	Deputy Director of Joint Strategic Planning of the Joint Staff; 2019–2020	Succeeded by Stephen F. Jost
Preceded by David Julazadeh	Director for Plans, Policy, Strategy, and Capabilities of the United States European Command; 2020–2022	Succeeded by Daniel T. Lasica
Preceded by Bradley Gericke	Director of Strategy, Plans, and Policy of the United States Army; 2022–2024	Succeeded by Stephanie R. Ahern
