= Joint Enabling Capabilities Command =

Subordinate command of U.S. Transportation Command

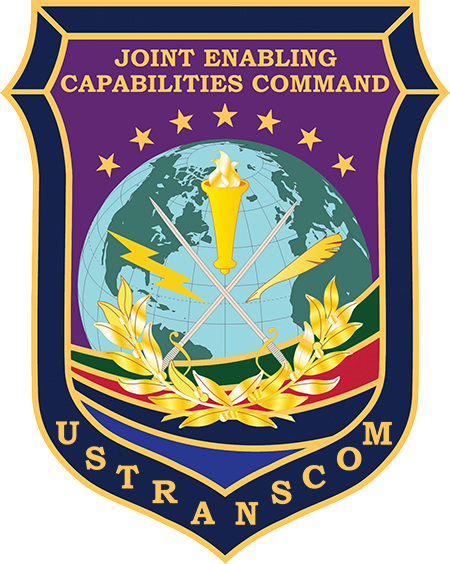
Emblem of the Joint Enabling Capabilities Command

The Joint Enabling Capabilities Command (JECC) is a subordinate command of United States Transportation Command, headquartered at Naval Station Norfolk, Virginia. It was previously part of United States Joint Forces Command. It developed from the Standing Joint Force Headquarters concept trialed during Exercise Millennium Challenge 2002.

Its mission is to provide expeditionary joint command and control (C2) enabling capabilities (joint planners, public affairs specialists, and communications) to Combatant Commanders (CCDRs) globally, for the rapid establishment of Joint Force Headquarters (JFHQ) in competition, crisis, and conflict..

Its two elements provide capabilities across seven unique functional areas. It aims to bring these packages to a joint force commander within hours of notification. The JECC subordinate commands are:

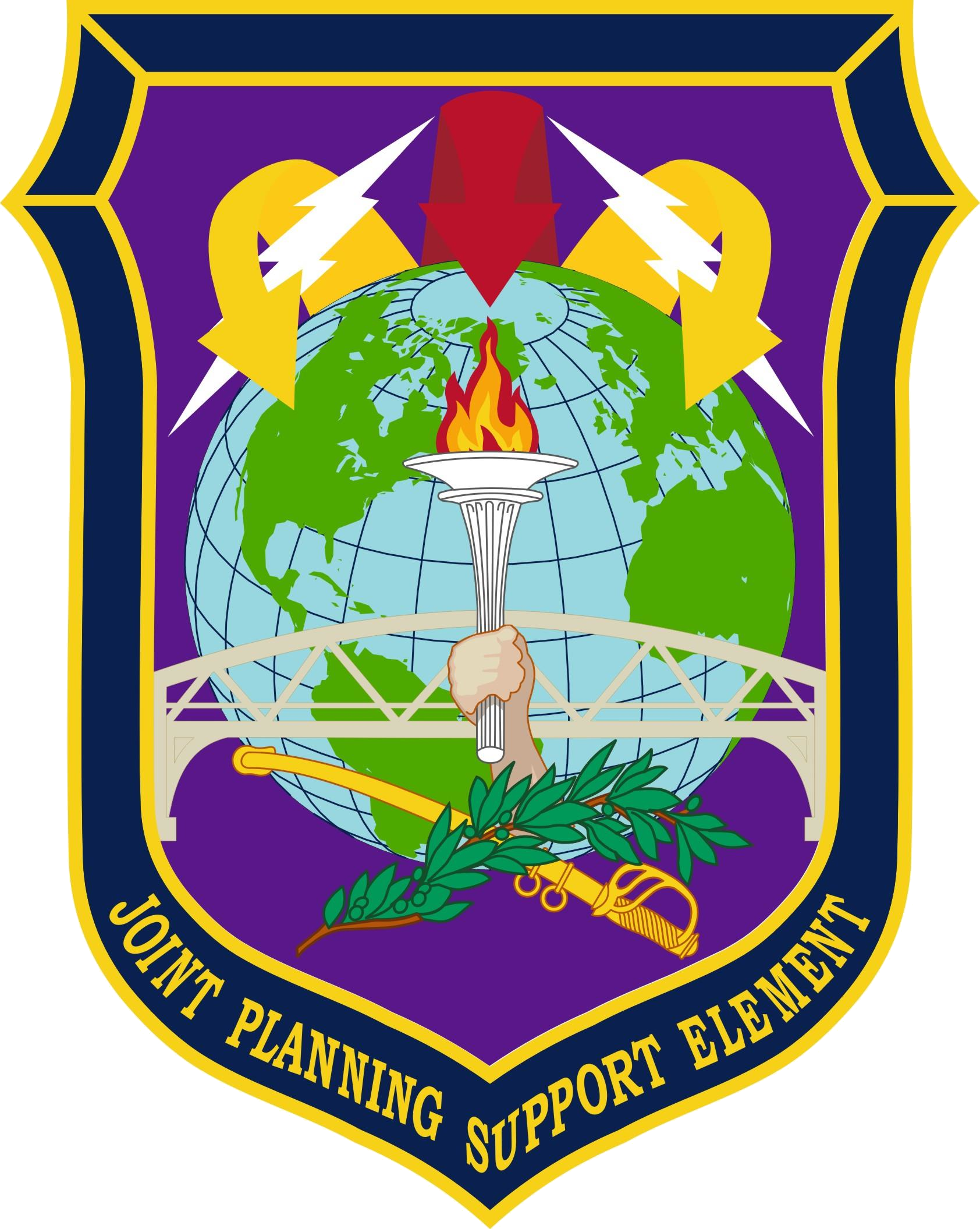
The Joint Planning Support Element (JPSE) – Provides rapidly deployable, tailored, ready, joint planners, operators, logisticians, knowledge managers, and intelligence specialists in order to accelerate the formation and increase the effectiveness of newly formed joint force headquarters. JPSE also provides ready, rapidly deployable, joint public affairs capabilities to combatant commanders in order to facilitate rapid establishment of joint force headquarters and bridge joint public affairs requirements. JPSE is co-located with the JECC headquarters at Naval Station Norfolk, Virginia.

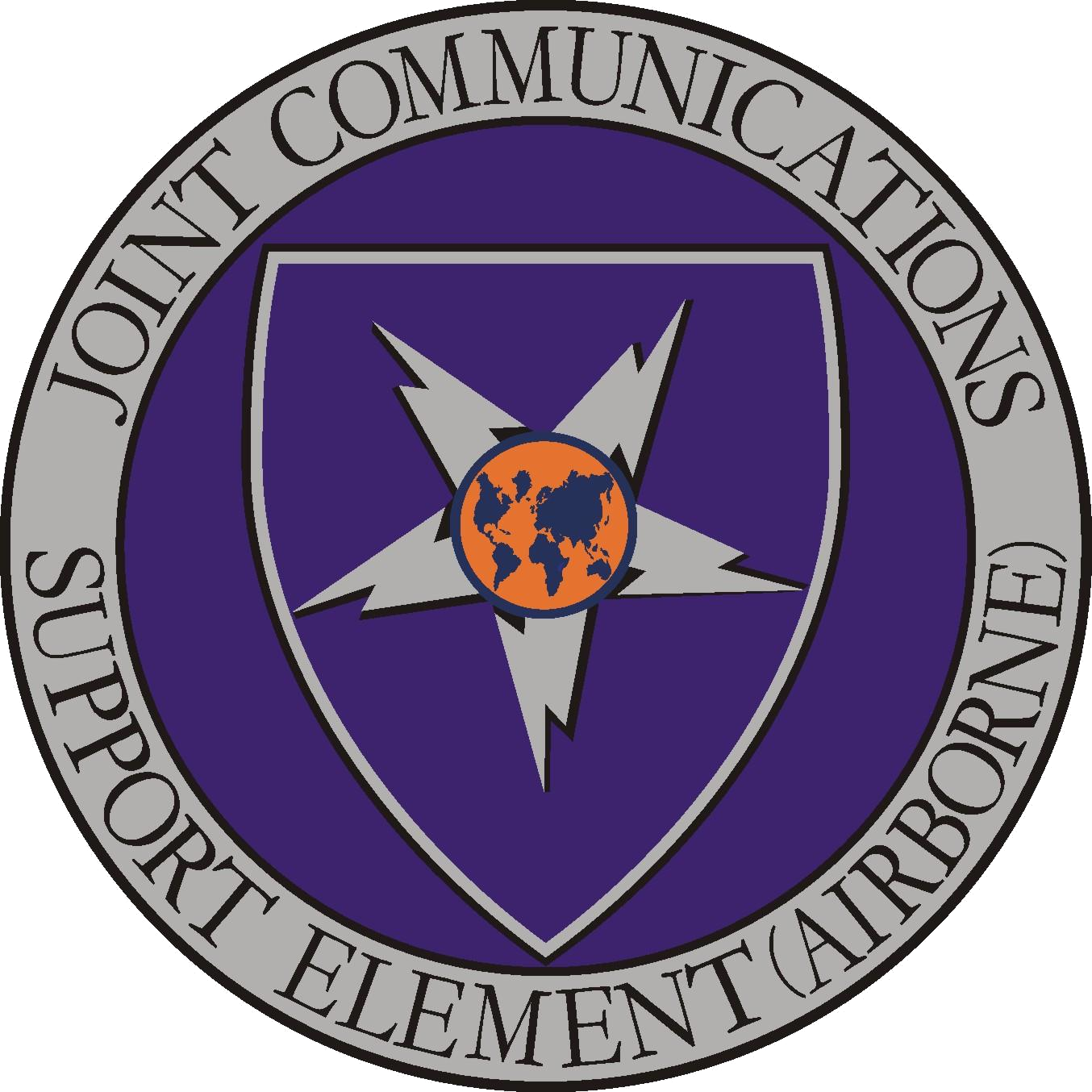
The Joint Communications Support Element (Airborne) (JCSE) – Provides rapidly deployable, en route, early entry and scalable command, control, communications, computer, intelligence, surveillance and reconnaissance (C4ISR) capabilities across the full spectrum of operations in order to facilitate rapid establishment of joint force headquarters and bridge joint C4ISR requirements. JCSE is located at MacDill Air Force Base, Florida.

== List of commanders ==
No.	Commander		Term		
No.	Portrait	Name	Took office	Left office	Term length
-	Scott Stearney	Rear Admiral; Scott Stearney	August 2011	September 2013	~2 years, 31 days
-	Bret C. Batchelder	Rear Admiral; Bret C. Batchelder	September 2013	February 2015	~1 year, 153 days
-	Sam C. Barrett	Brigadier General; Sam C. Barrett	February 2015	11 July 2017	~2 years, 160 days
-	Lenny J. Richoux	Major General; Lenny J. Richoux	11 July 2017	11 July 2019	2 years
-	Sean M. Jenkins	Major General; Sean M. Jenkins	11 July 2019	9 July 2021	1 year, 363 days
-	Paul Spedero	Rear Admiral (lower half); Paul Spedero	9 July 2021	23 May 2022	318 days
-	Stephen F. Jost	Major General; Stephen F. Jost	23 May 2022	11 July 2024	2 years, 49 days
-	Michael E. McWilliams	Brigadier General; Michael E. McWilliams	11 July 2024	Incumbent	1 year, 213 days
