= Bradley Gericke =

U.S. Army general

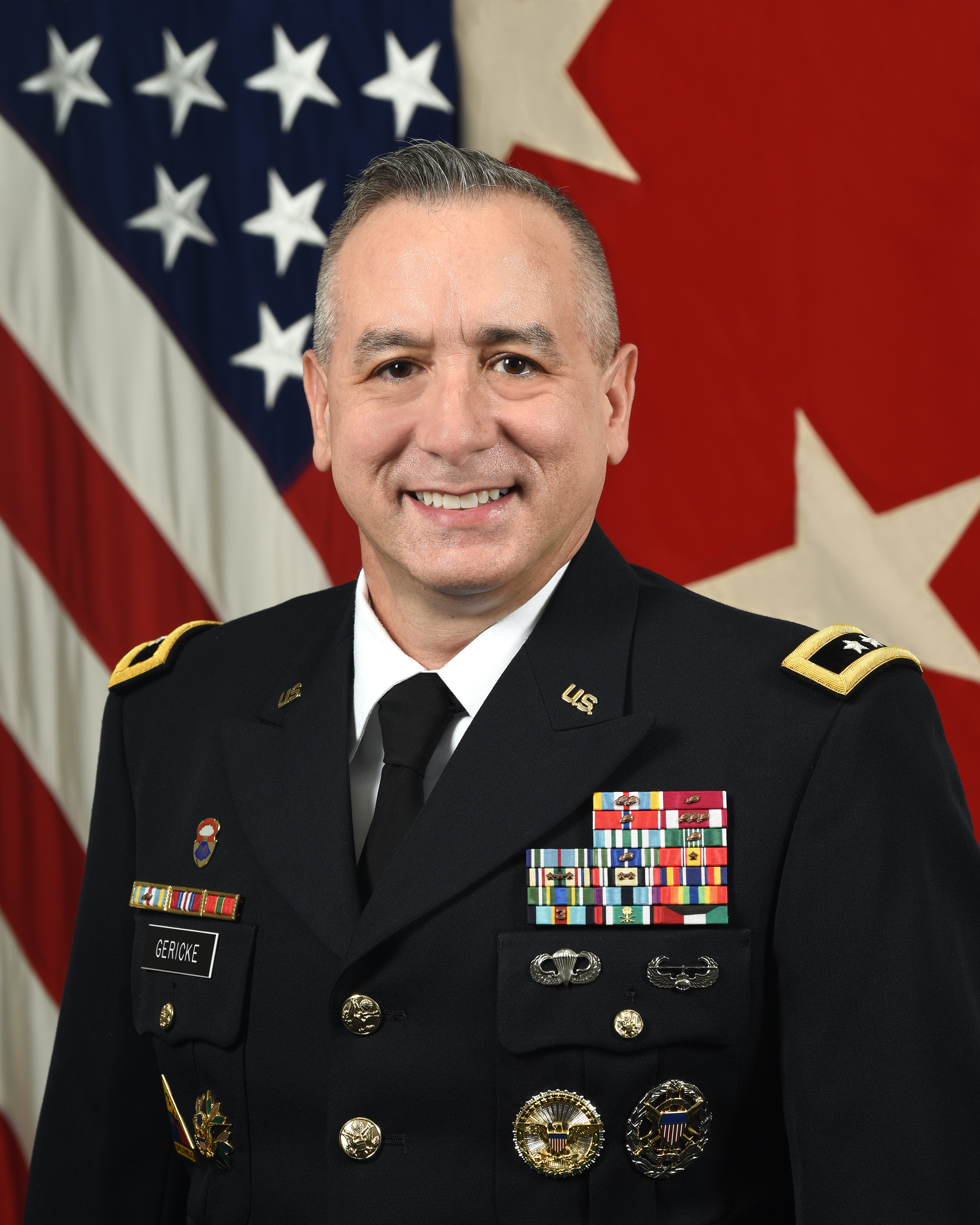
- Official portrait, 2019
- Born: December 3, 1965 (age 60); Illinois, U.S.
- Military career
- Allegiance: United States
- Branch: United States Army
- Service years: 1988–2022
- Rank: Major General
- Conflicts: Gulf War; Iraq War
- Awards: Defense Superior Service Medal (2); Legion of Merit (2); Bronze Star Medal (2)

Bradley Thomas Gericke (born December 3, 1965) is a military historian and retired United States Army major general who last served as the deputy director of Strategy, Plans, and Policy of the Army Staff from July 2019 to April 2022. He was previously the deputy director of Joint Strategic Planning, Strategy, Plans, and Policy of the Joint Staff.

Born in Illinois, Gericke graduated from the United States Military Academy in 1988 with a B.S. degree in modern European history. He earned an M.A. degree in history from Vanderbilt University in 1996 with a thesis entitled Good members of the Commonwealth: the professionalization of teaching in early modern England. Gericke then served as an assistant professor of history at the U.S. Military Academy from 1996 to 1998. He received a Master of Military Art and Science degree in strategy from the Army Command and General Staff College in 2001 with a thesis entitled Civil wars in Britain, 1640-1646: military revolution on campaign and completed a Ph.D. degree in military history at Vanderbilt in September 2002 with a thesis entitled Covenanters to battle: the Scots' victory during the Bishops' Wars, 1639–1640. Gericke also earned an M.S. degree in national security strategy from the National Defense University.

== Publications ==
- David Petraeus: A Biography. ABC-CLIO. November 18, 2010. ISBN 978-0313383786.
- The U. S. Army's Third Armored Division in Battle: From Normandy to the Persian Gulf. ABC-CLIO, LLC. August 31, 2017. ISBN 978-1440833137.

Military offices
Preceded by James J. Mingus	Deputy Director of Strategy, Plans, and Policy of the United States Central Command; 2015–2017	Succeeded by Charles R. Miller
Preceded by Christopher P. McPadden	Deputy Director of Joint Strategic Planning of the Joint Staff; 2017–2019	Succeeded by Charles R. Miller
Preceded by Christopher P. McPadden	Director of Strategy, Plans, and Policy of the United States Army; 2019–2022	Succeeded by Charles R. Miller
