= Sam C. Barrett =

Lieutenant general

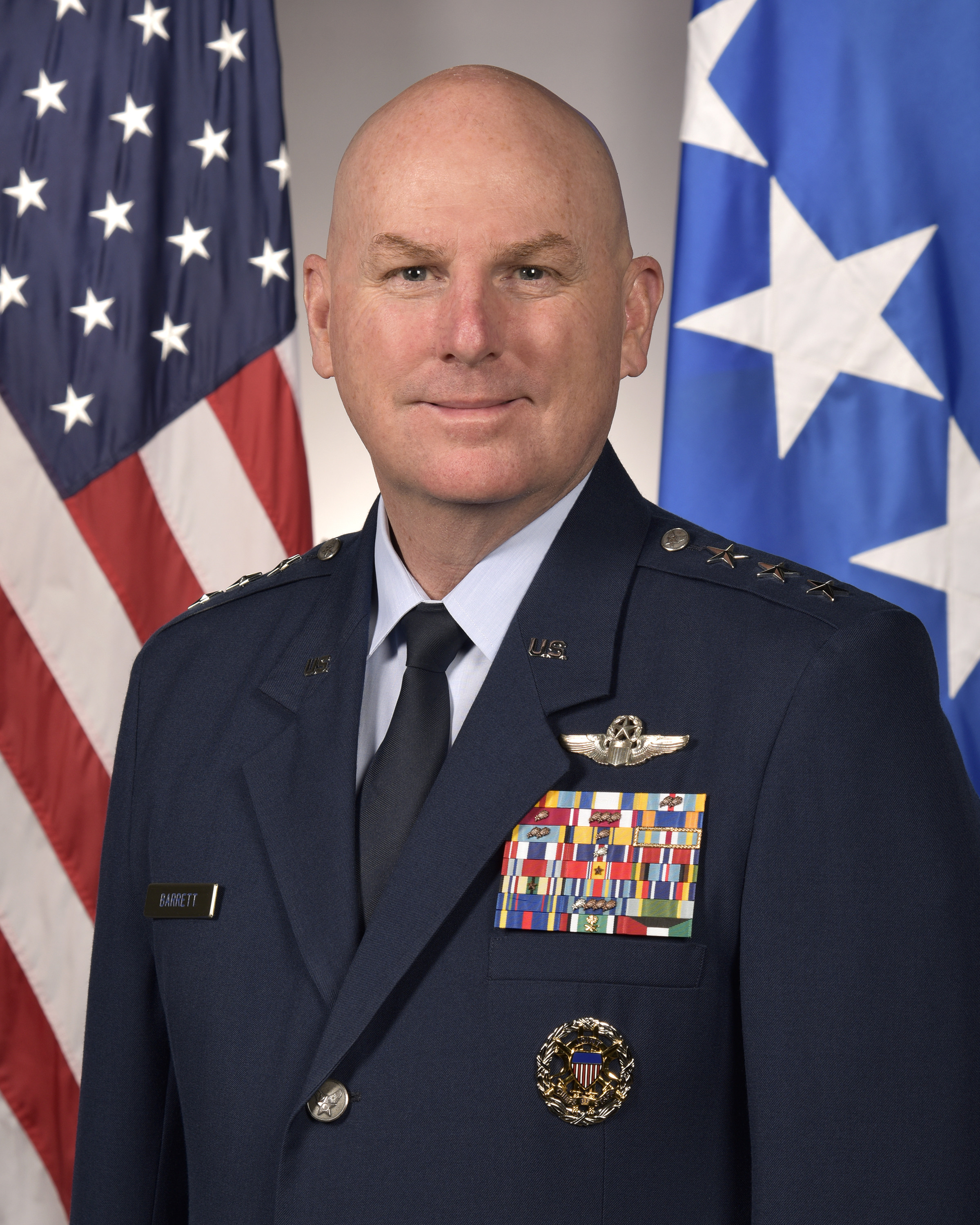
- Military career
- Allegiance: United States
- Branch: United States Air Force
- Service years: 1988–2022
- Rank: Lieutenant general
- Commands: Eighteenth Air Force; Joint Enabling Capabilities Command; 15th Wing
- Conflicts: Gulf War
- Awards: Air Force Distinguished Service Medal; Defense Superior Service Medal (3); Legion of Merit (2)

Sam C. Barrett is a retired United States Air Force lieutenant general who last served as the director of logistics of the Joint Staff. He previously served as commander of the Eighteenth Air Force. Prior to his current position, he was the director of operations, strategic deterrence and nuclear integration of the Air Force Materiel Command.

The United States Senate confirmed his promotion to lieutenant general and nomination to become the director for logistics of the Joint Staff, replacing Lieutenant General Giovanni K. Tuck whom he also succeeded as eighteenth Air Force commander.

== Effective dates of promotions ==
Rank	Date
Second lieutenant	June 1, 1988
First lieutenant	June 1, 1990
Captain	June 1, 1992
Major	October 1, 1999
Lieutenant colonel	March 1, 2003
Colonel	September 1, 2007
Brigadier general	November 2, 2013
Major general	September 2, 2017
Lieutenant general	September 4, 2020

Military offices
Preceded by Bret C. Batchelder	Commander of the Joint Enabling Capabilities Command; 2015–2017	Succeeded by Lenny J. Richoux
Preceded by Brian S. Robinson	Director of Operations, Strategic Deterrence, and Nuclear Integration of the Air Mobility Command; 2017–2018	Succeeded by Darren V. James
Preceded by Giovanni K. Tuck	Commander of the Eighteenth Air Force; 2018–2020	Succeeded by Kenneth Bibb
Preceded by Giovanni K. Tuck	Director for Logistics of the Joint Staff; 2020–2022	Succeeded by Leonard Kosinski
