= Joint Communications Support Element =

United States military unit

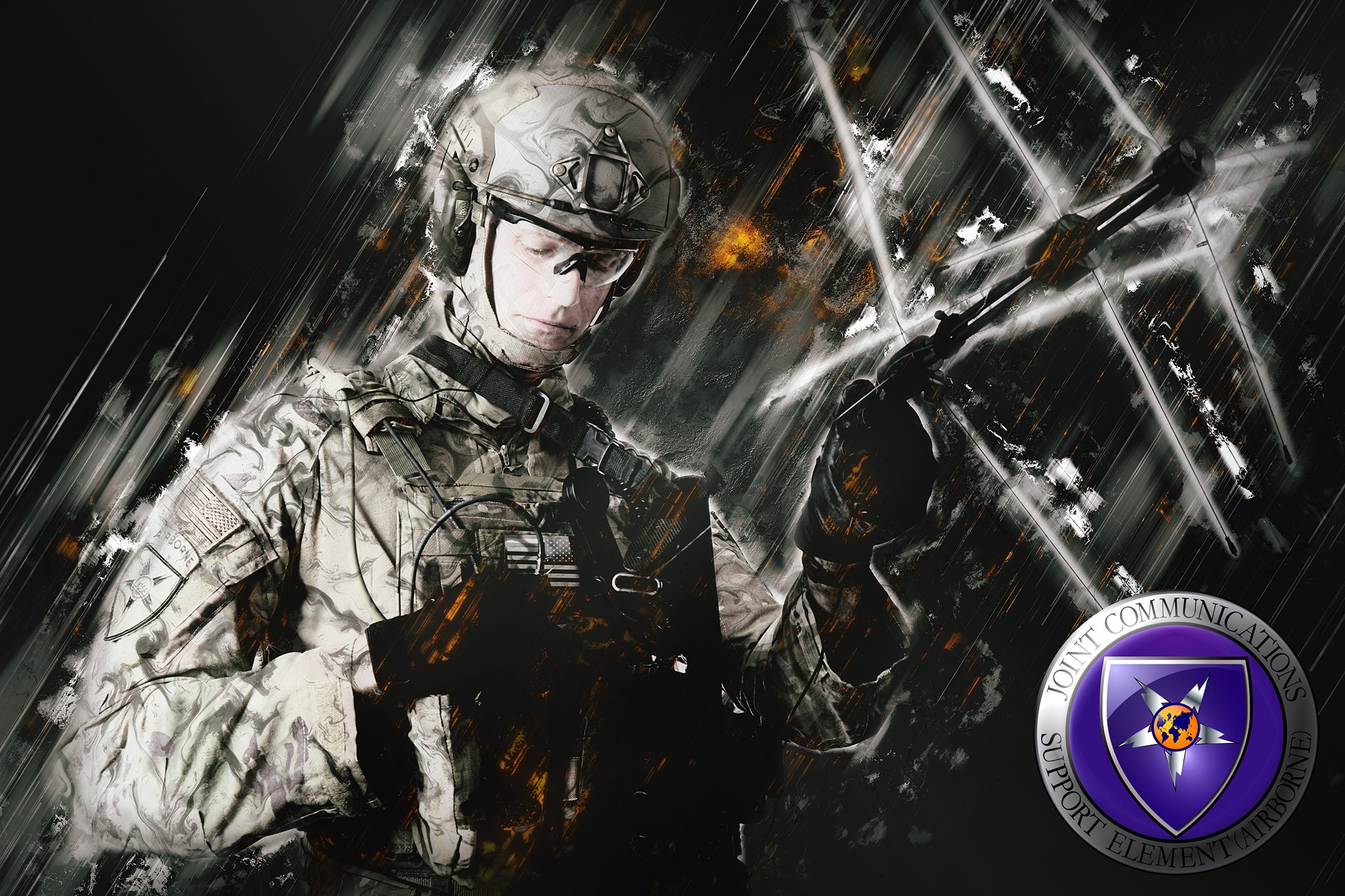
- Stylized rendering of a JCSE Communicator
- Active: 1961–present
- Country: United States
- Branch: Department of Defense
- Type: Joint (Army, Navy, Air Force, Marine, and DoD Civilian) communications unit
- Role: Expeditionary C4 for joint forces headquarters
- Part of: Joint Enabling Capabilities Command
- Garrison/HQ: MacDill Air Force Base, Florida
- Motto: "Voice Heard 'Round the World"
- Color of berets: Maroon
- Decorations: Most recent award: Joint Meritorious Unit Award (2009)
- Website: Official government website Official Facebook page

Commanders
- Commander: Colonel Kyle R Yates (USA)
- Deputy Commander: Lieutenant Colonel Christopher F Oppenlander (USAF)
- Senior enlisted advisor: Command Sergeant Major Matthew D. Jacobs (USA)

Insignia
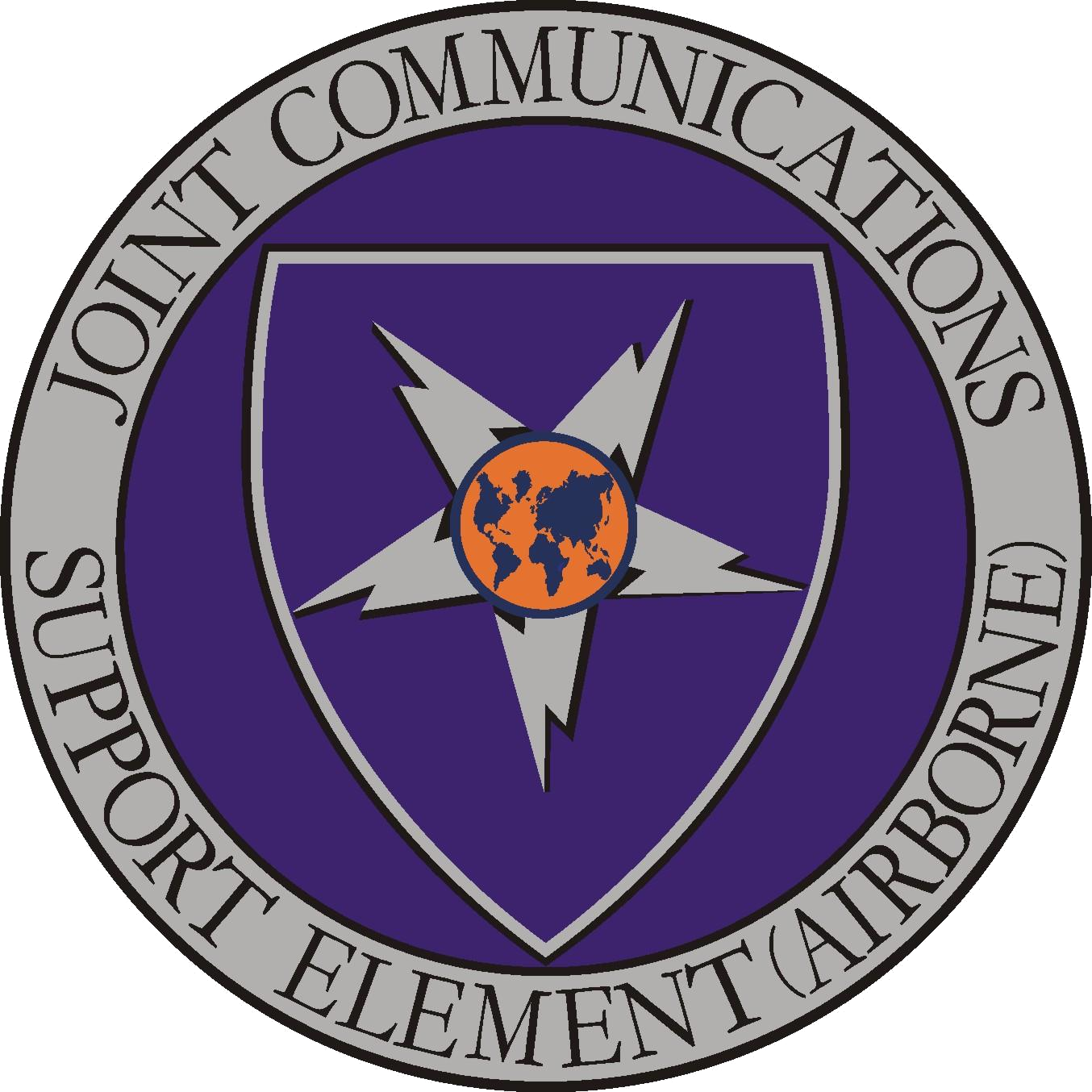
- JCSE seal

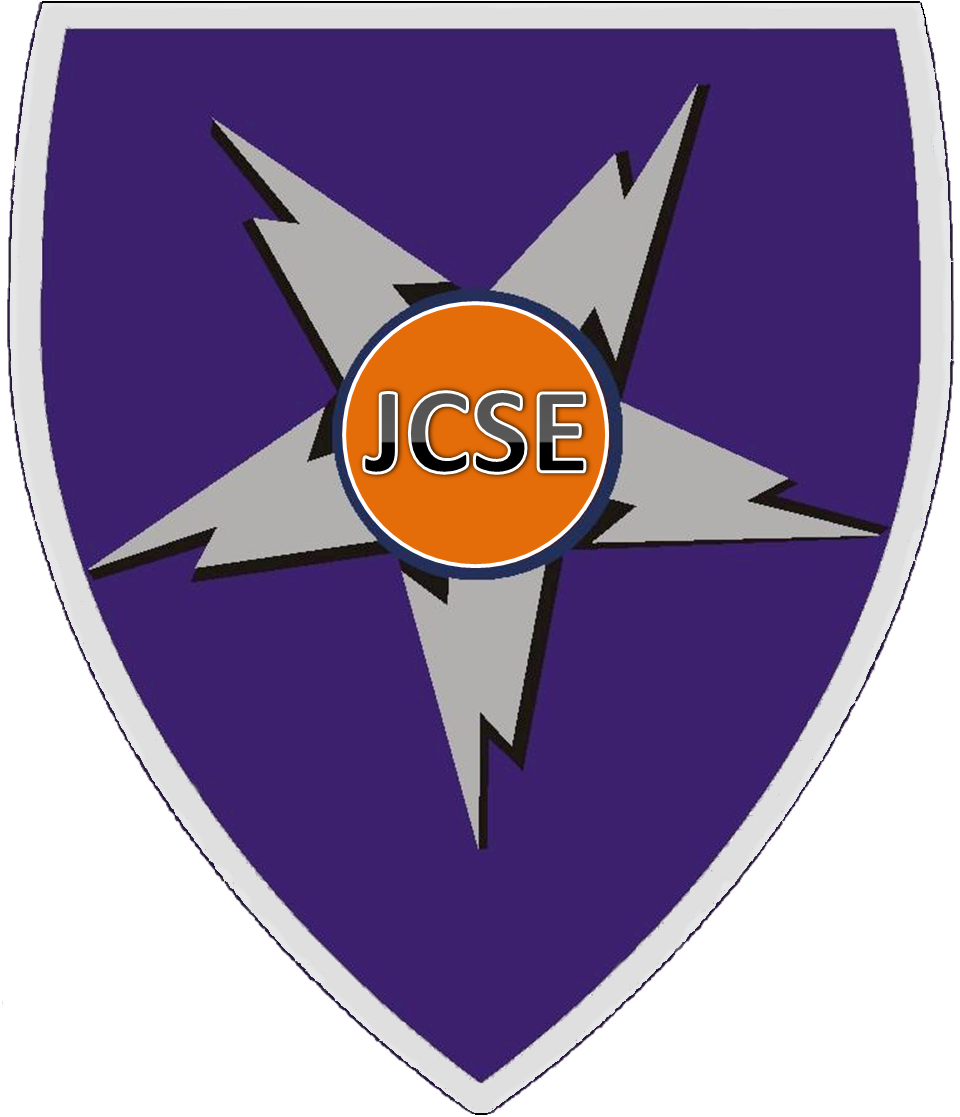
- Distinctive unit insignia

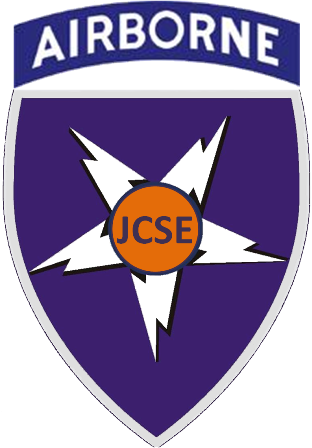
- Shoulder sleeve insignia

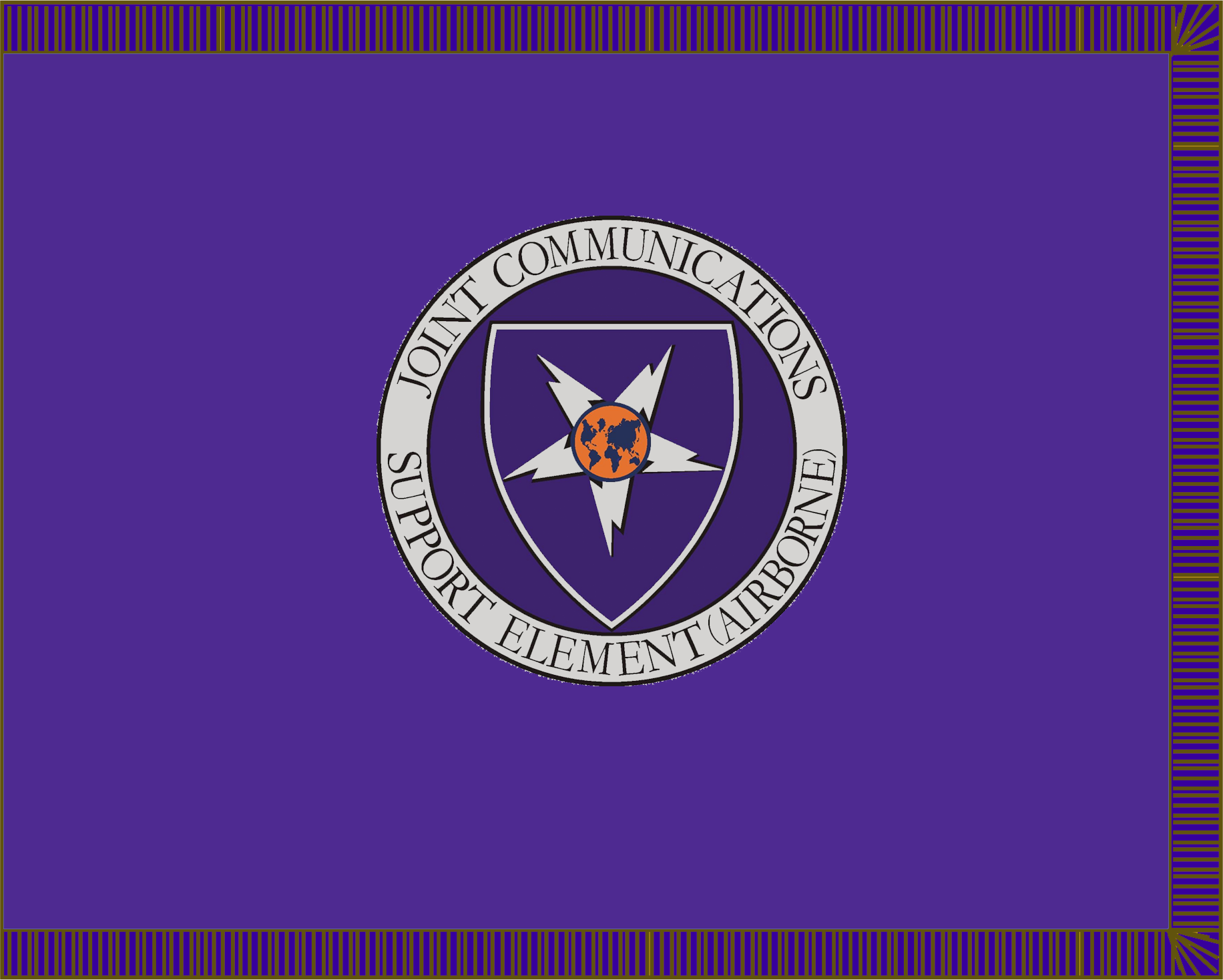
- Joint Communications Support Element Flag

The Joint Communications Support Element (Airborne) (JCSE) is a United States Department of Defense (DoD) standing joint force headquarters expeditionary communications provider that can provide rapid deployable, en route, early entry, and scalable command, control, communications, and computer (C4) support to the unified combatant commands, special operations commands, and other agencies as directed by the Joint Chiefs of Staff. On order, the JCSE can provide additional C4 services within 72 hours to support larger combined joint task force headquarters across the full spectrum of operations. JCSE is part of the Joint Enabling Capabilities Command (JECC), a subordinate command of the U.S. Transportation Command (USTRANSCOM).

The JCSE's core competency is communications support to contingency operations. The JCSE is equipped with the latest technologies to meet the DoD's operational requirements. The JCSE is a joint tactical airborne unit that has a rare ability to operate at the tactical, operational, and strategic levels. As a part of their contingency mission, the JCSE's en route, initial entry, or early entry communications capabilities can support up to a 40-personnel joint task force in permissive and non-permissive environments. The JCSE is also equipped and trained to support larger joint task force headquarters as well as two joint special operations task force headquarters for up to 1,500 users. At times, members of the JCSE may be required to rapidly deploy without the rest of their squadron to execute their assigned mission.

== History ==
When JCSE was stood up in 1961, each branch maintained its own communications units. Those resources were typically predesignated for specific mission sets that could not meet the demand for joint operations. JCSE was established to fill this gap as a dedicated communications resource for short-notice contingency operations.

The JCSE was established at MacDill Air Force Base as the Communications Support Element (CSE) under the now disestablished U.S. Strike Command—redesignated U.S. Readiness Command (USREDCOM) in 1972. With just over 400 U.S. Air Force and U.S. Army personnel assigned, the CSE was established to serve as a quick response communications unit during crisis and contingency operations. In 1972, the U.S. Navy and U.S. Marine Corps joined the CSE, and was redesignated as JCSE with operational control transferred to the Joint Chiefs of Staff. At the deactivation of USREDCOM in 1987, administrative control of JCSE was reassigned to U.S. Central Command where it remained until 1998 when it transferred to U.S. Atlantic Command—which transitioned to U.S. Joint Forces Command (USJFCOM) in 1999—along with operational control. In 2008, the JECC was established and JCSE became one of its three subordinate commands. Following the disestablishment of USJFCOM in 2011, both the JECC and its subordinate commands were reassigned to USTRANSCOM.

Within the first two decades of its existence, JCSE's two original units—the 1st and 2nd Joint Communications Squadrons—employed their expertise to a variety of military operations including:

- Support to the commander of JTF-Leo in the Democratic Republic of the Congo in 1964
- The international force organized to counter the rebel invasion of southern Zaire - Shaba II - including the Battle of Kolwezi, in 1978.
- The evacuation of U.S. citizens from Nicaragua under the fall of the Somoza government in June 1979

As word of the Element's capabilities spread, the demand for JCSE increased. In the 1980s, JCSE adjusted its mission to provide concurrent joint communications support to more than one commander. This adjustment allowed the JCSE to support two joint task forces and two joint special operations task forces simultaneously. To accomplish this, the JCSE had two Air National Guard units aligned to the JCSE mission.

In 2005, JCSE was tasked as a global joint force C4 enabler. Reorganizing existing resources to add another active-duty squadron, JCSE was postured to support this new role.

In 2006, the 4th Joint Communications Squadron, an Army Reserve unit, was added to bring additional flexibility to JCSE.

JCSE teams have deployed all over the world enabling DoD senior leaders to communicate in conflict zones and disaster areas. Two examples of this are JCSE's longest continuous deployment from the start of Operation Iraqi Freedom through the end of Operation New Dawn and JCSE's support to Operation Tomodachi. Operation Tomodachi is a good example of JCSE's flexibility when it deployed and made operational the Deployable Joint Command and Control (DJC2) system to Yokota Air Base, Japan within 72 hours of notification to support U.S. Pacific Command's orchestration of the operation.

According to Colonel James Lowery, commander of JCSE, the Element is modernizing to provide better communications capabilities saying in a 2021 interview with SIGNAL Magazine, “We’ve been focusing a lot over the past eight months on a contested communications environment. We know that’s one of the primary challenges—the multi-domain fight and being able to fight through the noise and operate in those contested spaces—so we’ve adjusted our training to focus on that.”

== Structure ==
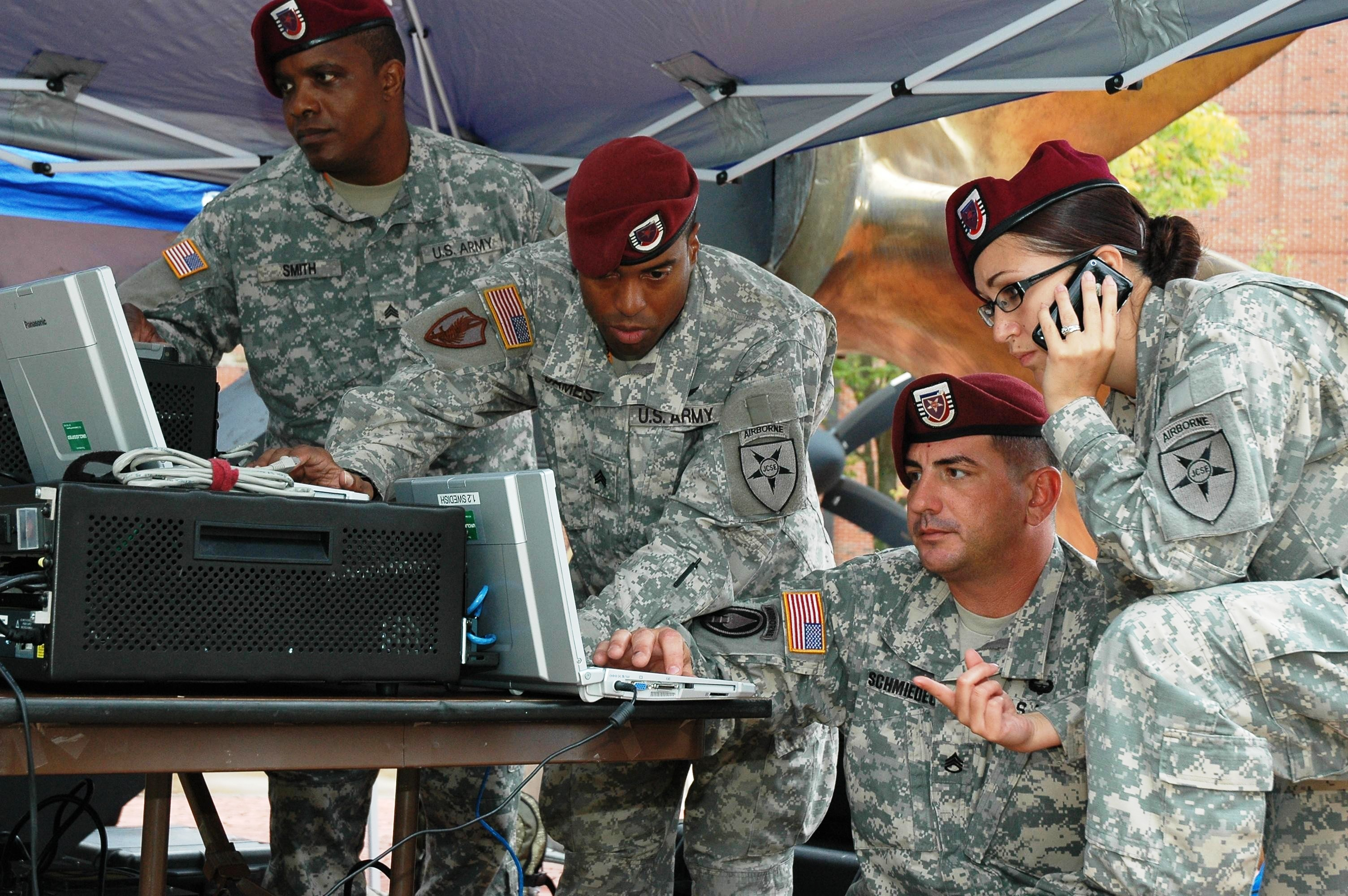
Communicators from the 4th Joint Communications Squadron troubleshoot communications during a no-notice exercise, 2013

The JCSE is made up of both active and reserve components. Currently, the active component is made up of four district units filled with trained experts from across the armed forces of the DoD while the reserve component is made up of one dedicated Army Reserve unit and two Air National Guard units, specifically:

- Headquarters and Support Squadron ("Wolfpack")
- 1st Joint Communications Squadron ("Knights")
- 2nd Joint Communications Squadron (“Warriors”)
- 4th Joint Communications Squadron ("Mustangs") (Army Reserve)
- 224th Joint Communications Support Squadron (Georgia Air National Guard)
- 290th Joint Communications Support Squadron (Florida Air National Guard)
- Communications Support Detachment ("Pirates")

== Training ==
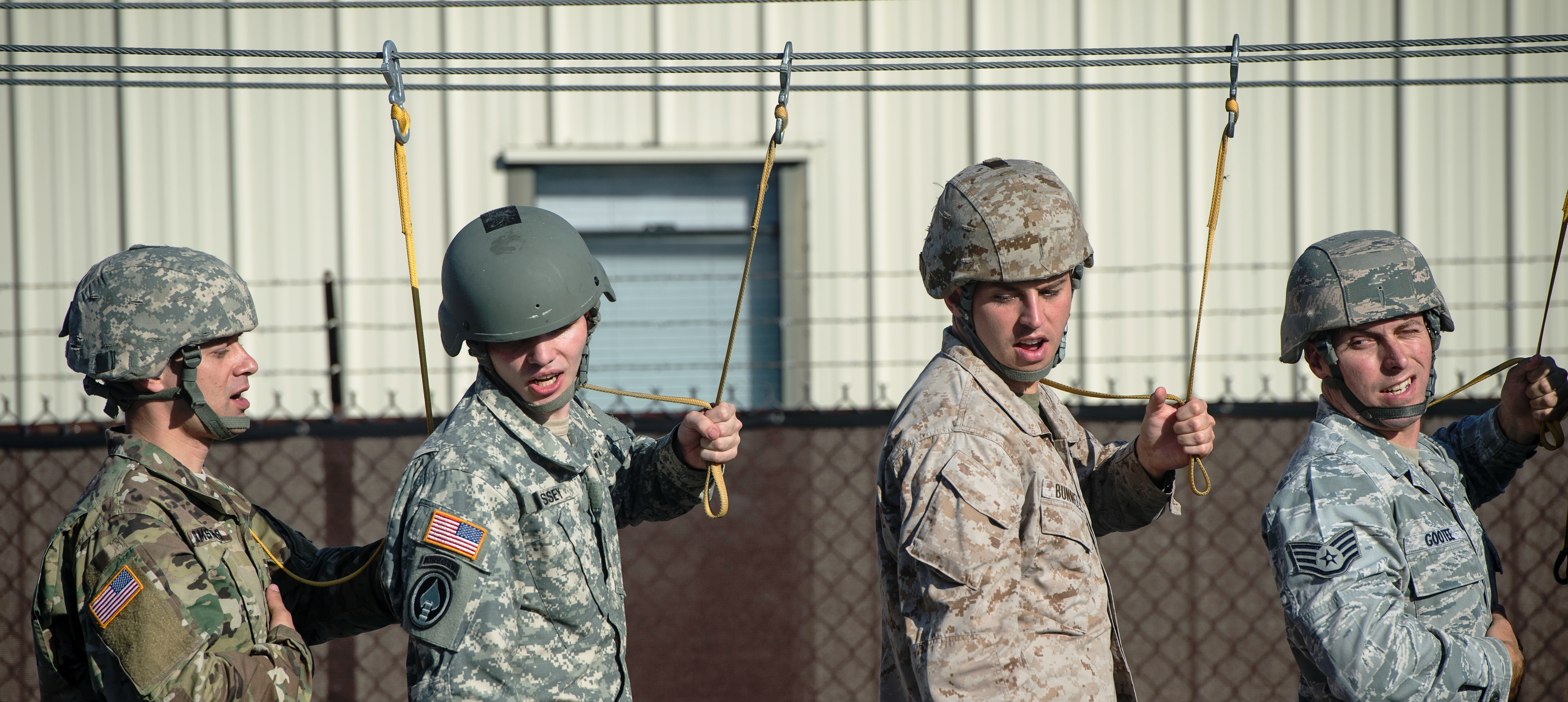
JCSE communicators from the Air Force, Army, and Marine Corps rehearse aircraft procedures for an upcoming parachute jump, 2016

All of JCSE's military members receive additional skills training so they can better accomplish their global mission. The tactical skills JCSE members learn or must stay proficient in include airborne infiltration, maritime insertion, basic combat skills, combatives, combat driving, combat life saving, and weapons qualifications. JCSE also has its own university that is designed to fill the educational void between civilian and military communications capabilities. Every member assigned to a JCSE squadron must go through this university's training for the unit requires that squadron members, regardless of their communications specialty, must be able to do all aspects of communications due to the size and makeup of their teams.

== Equipment ==
The JCSE has a modernization program with authorities based on a joint staff memorandum and financial investments that allow the Element to acquire commercial off-the-shelf and government off-the-shelf equipment as well as new technologies available to accomplish its mission with twenty-four-seven reach-back capability and access to DoD and commercial networks that can be deployed in hours. Some of the equipment the JCSE employs and maintains include, but are not limited to the following:

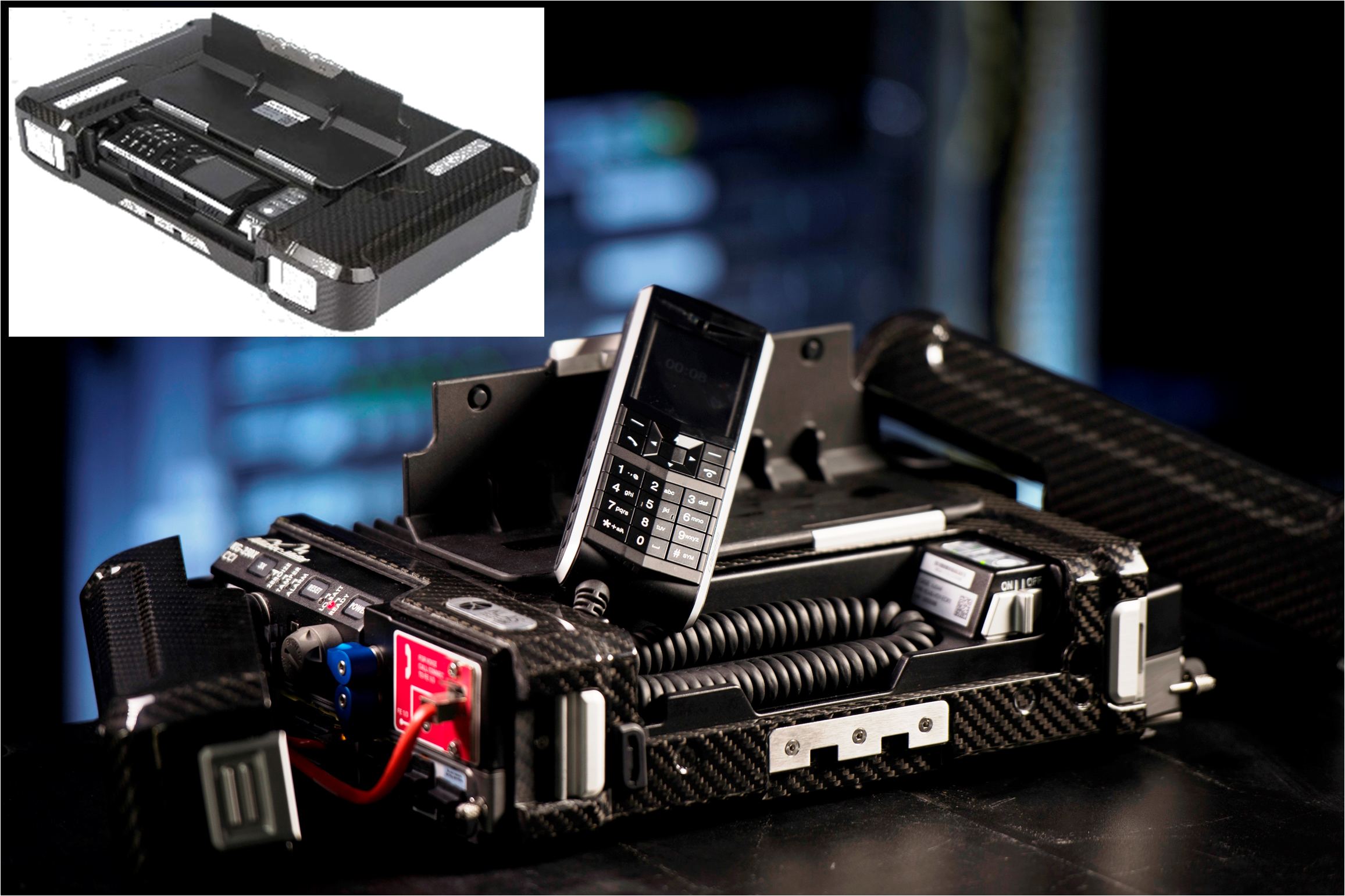
Executive Communications Kit, commercially sold as the VoyagerECK

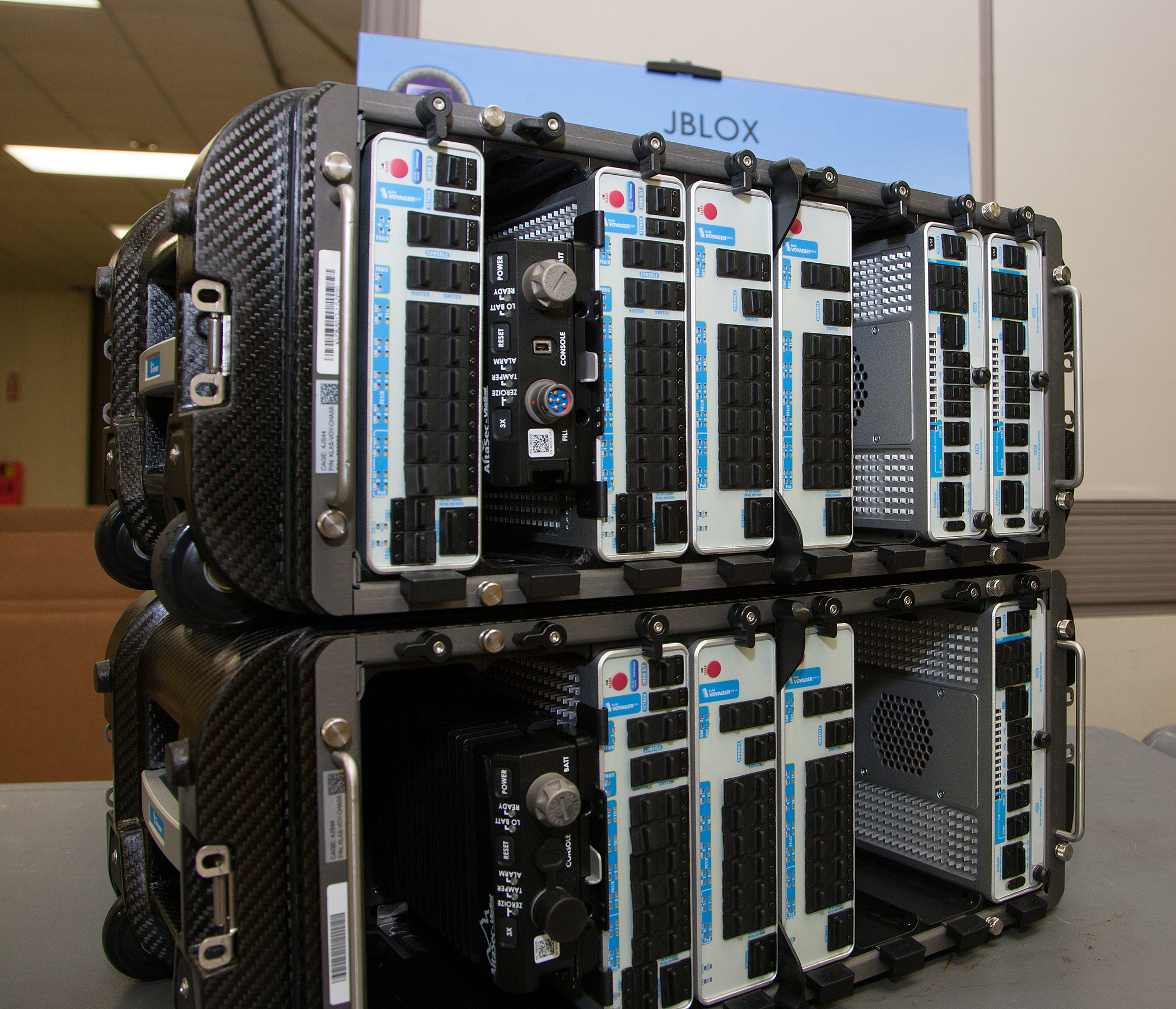
JCSE's JBLOX modular package

- Executive Communications Kit: Originally developed by the JCSE as the Executive Voice Kit—upgraded to the Executive Communications Kit and transferred to the Defense Information Systems Agency (DISA)—is a small briefcase-sized self-contained kit designed specifically to provide around-to-clock customer access to secure and nonsecure voice, data, and Internet via the "everything over Internet Protocol" (IP) architecture.
- Standard/Lite Communications Node: A modular IP based package capable of providing secure and non-secure voice, data and video for a myriad of operations ranging from small initial or early entry communications systems up to the establishment of a task force.
- Joint Building Blocks (JBLOX): The JCSE created JBLOX communications system is a modular IP based package capable of providing secure and non-secure voice, data, and video services. The system can be modularized to support a myriad of operations scaling from a very small initial or early entry communications system up to establishment of a joint or special operations task force.
- Initial Entry Package (IEP): The IEP is used to support combatant commanders or other high-profile users during the initial entry period of an operation until mission complete or prior to installation of more robust modular internet protocol packages. The IEP supports up to four Secure Terminal Equipment (STE) telephones.
- Early Entry Package (EEP): The EEP augments the modular scalability of the IEP or operates as a stand-alone package. Clients connect to the EEP's Ethernet ports and use soft phones or VoIP compliant telephones. The EEP supports up to eight STE telephones.

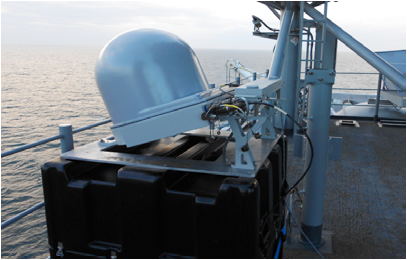
JCSE's Super High Frequency Carry-on Shipboard System Joint

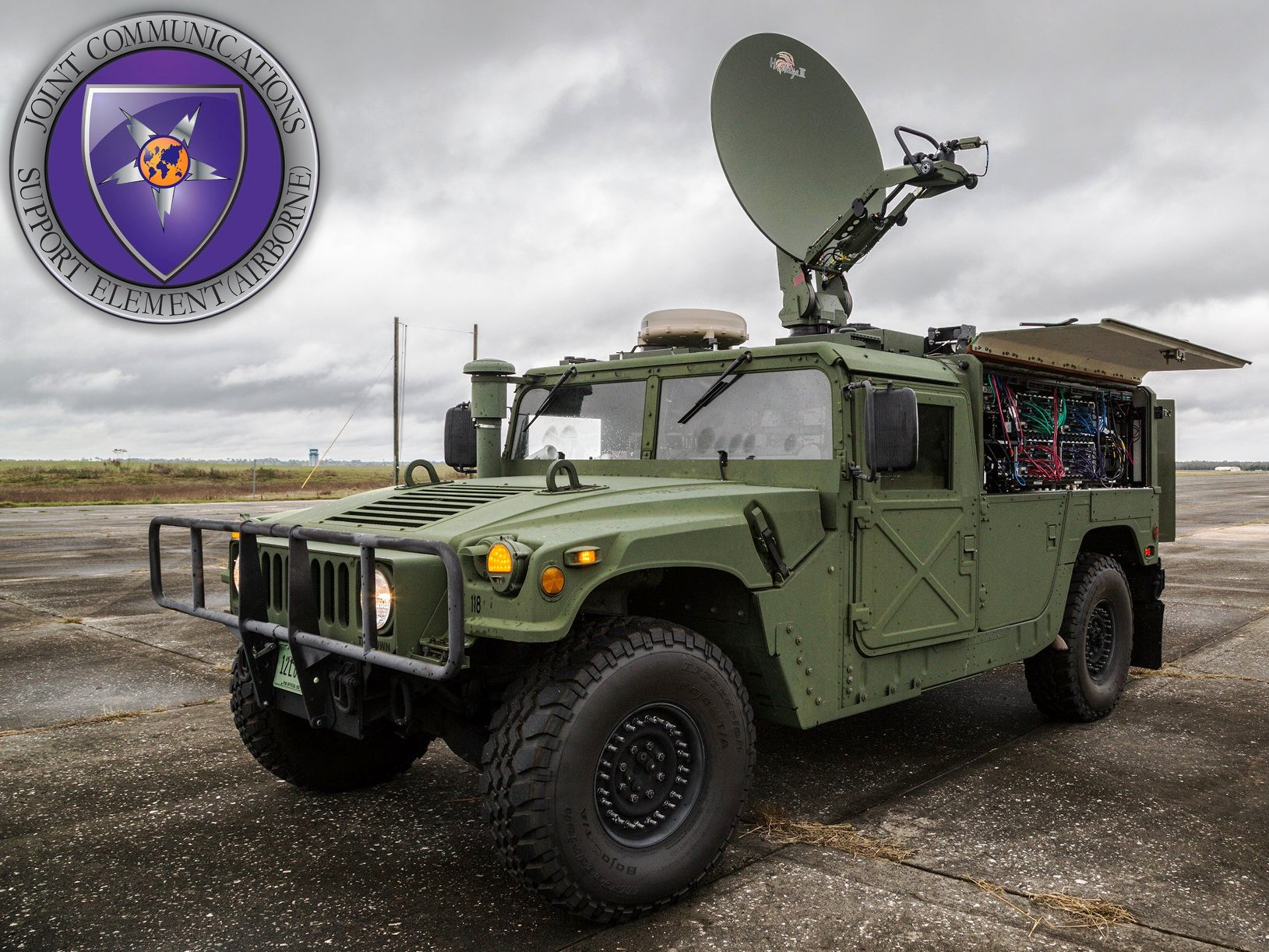
JCSE's ICV

- Super High Frequency Carry-on Shipboard System Joint: A mobile system designed by the JCSE to provide on-the-move shipboard connectivity with the DoD Wideband Global SATCOM systems and commercial satellite communications systems.
- Integrated Communications Vehicle (ICV): The ICV is a customized mobile communications system of JCSE that provides on-the-move and at-halt command and control capabilities to various task force commanders and combatant commanders.
- Joint Deployable Airborne Package (JDAP): The JDAP is a system designed to provide airborne communications en route during mission execution. The JDAP provides extensive networking and radio capabilities to the airborne combat staff, mission planners, and tactical commanders while in transit. This system provides mission personnel with data and phone services, allowing them to communicate aboard the C-130 and satellite-equipped C-17 aircraft.

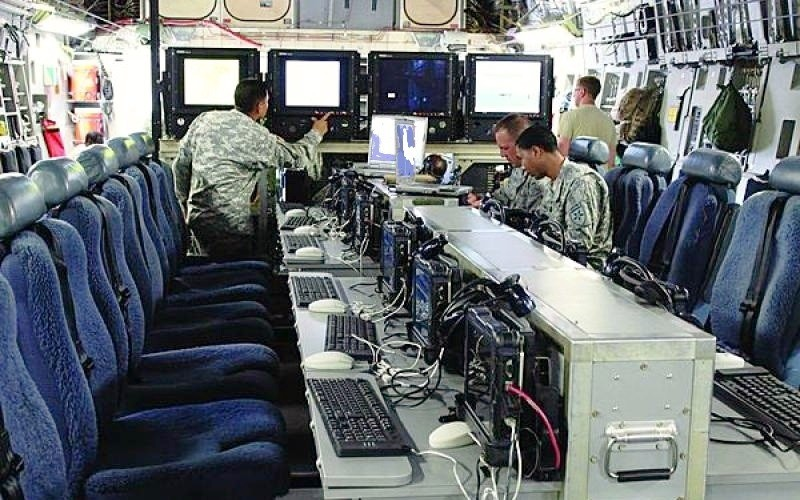
A JACC/CP pallet (12 seat configuration)

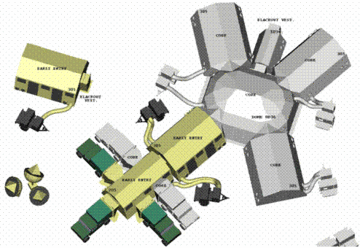
Drawing of the DJC2 Core

- Joint Airborne Communications Center/Command Post (JACC/CP): Provides an en-route command center aboard a C-130 or C-17 aircraft that supports up to 16 users on two platforms with classified and unclassified network access to include commercial Internet and phone capabilities.
- DJC2: Maintained by the JCSE, the DJC2 is a scalable command post that can support a full joint task force. Requires two C-17 aircraft to transport a DJC2 that can support up to 1500 users with classified and unclassified network access to include secure and non-secure voice and video teleconferencing capabilities.
- Defense Information Systems Network-Tactical Edge (DISN-TE): In partnership with DISA, JCSE maintains and operates three DISN-TE sites around the world capable of supporting all combatant commands. This network was established to integrate, manage, and control a wide variety of communications interfaces between DISN and deployed tactical satellite assets. DISN-TE is an "everything over IP" enhancement of the Standard Tactical Entry Point/Teleport reach-back service of the Global Information Grid. DISN-TE is made up of telecommunications collection and distribution points that provide warfighters with multiband, multimedia, and worldwide access in a deployed environment.

== See also ==
- Military communications
- Signal Corps (United States Army)
- Information systems technician (United States Navy)
- List of United States Marine Corps MOS–06 Communications
- List of United States Air Force communications squadrons
- Joint Communications Unit
- 112th Special Operations Signal Battalion
- United States military beret flash
