= Vice Director of the Joint Staff =

U.S. military two-star officer who reports to the Director of Joint of Staff

- Seal of the Joint Staff

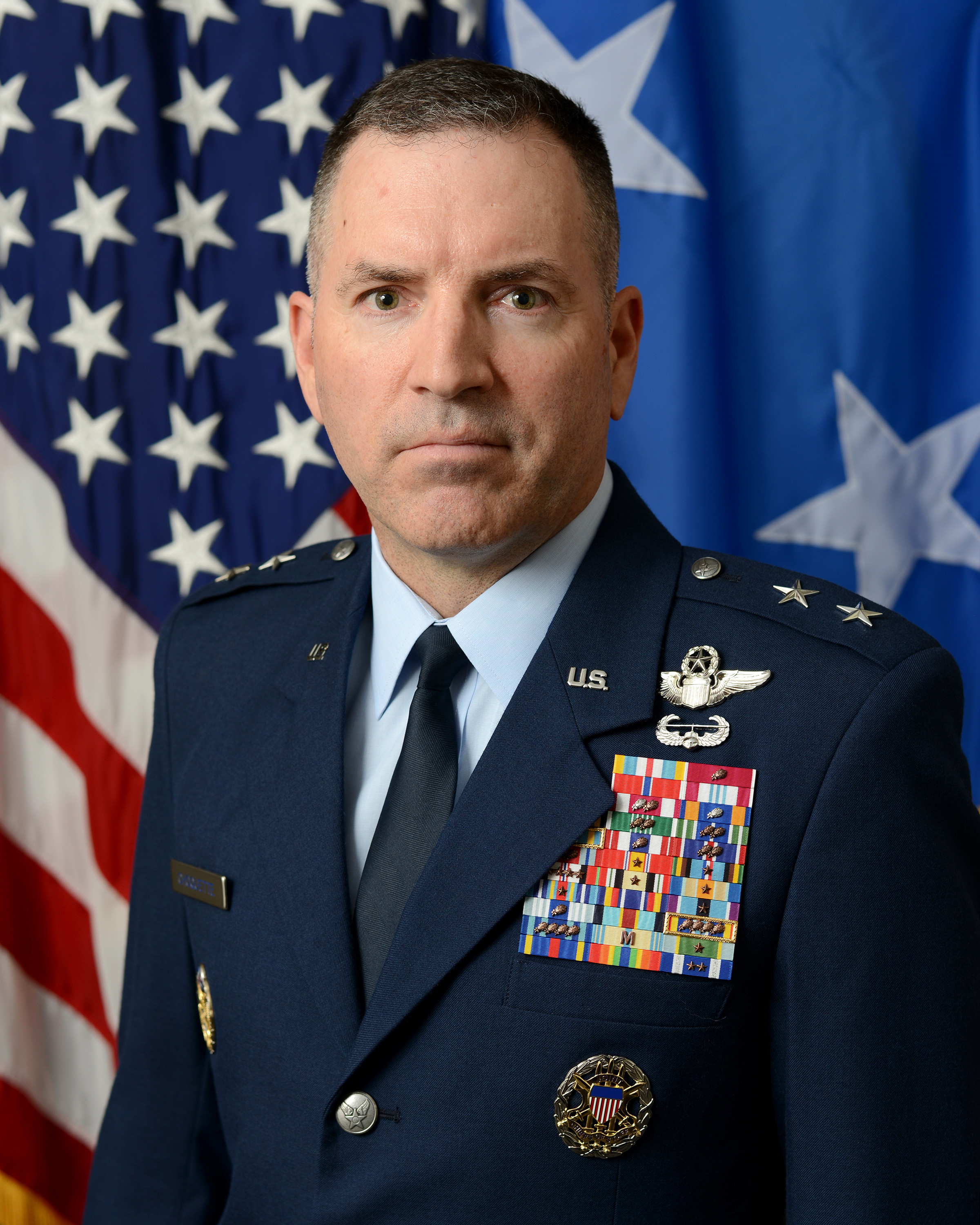
- Incumbent; Maj Gen Sean M. Choquette, USAF since ~16 July 2026
- Joint Staff
- Abbreviation: VDJS
- Reports to: Director of the Joint Staff
- Seat: The Pentagon, Arlington County, Virginia, U.S.
- Appointer: The CJCS
- Website: www.jcs.mil

The vice director of the Joint Staff (VDJS) is a two-star officer in the Joint Staff. The vice director reports to the director of the Joint Staff and provides oversight of Joint Staff support activities, including administration and action management, budget, information technology services, support services, and security. The vice director also oversees the directorate of management in the Joint Staff.

== List of vice directors of the Joint Staff ==
No.	Vice Director		Term			Service branch	Ref(s)
No.	Portrait	Name	Took office	Left office	Term length	Service branch	Ref(s)
1	Joseph H. Wellings	Rear Admiral; Joseph H. Wellings (1903–1988)	30 September 1958	~30 April 1962	~3 years, 212 days	U.S. Navy	
2	John M. Reynolds	Major General; John M. Reynolds	~30 April 1962	~January 1963	~246 days	U.S. Air Force	
3	Ashton H. Manhart	Major General; Ashton H. Manhart (1909–1969)	~January 1963	~January 1966	~3 years	U.S. Army	
4	Louis Joseph Kirn	Rear Admiral; Louis Joseph Kirn (1908–1995)	January 1966	December 1966	~1 year, 334 days	U.S. Navy	
5	John B. McPherson	Major General; John B. McPherson (born 1917)	~May 1967	~August 1968	~1 year, 92 days	U.S. Air Force	
6	Kelsie L. Reaves	Major General; Kelsie L. Reaves (1911–1994)	~August 1968	~January 1969	~153 days	U.S. Army	
7	Charles M. Mount	Major General; Charles M. Mount	~January 1969	~August 1970	~1 year, 212 days	U.S. Army	
8	Mason B. Freeman	Rear Admiral; Mason B. Freeman (1914–2003)	August 1970	~March 1972	~1 year, 213 days	U.S. Navy	
9	Martin G. Colladay	Major General; Martin G. Colladay (1925–2003)	May 1972	~March 1974	~1 year, 304 days	U.S. Air Force	
10	Adrian St. John II	Major General; Adrian St. John II (1921–2007)	~March 1974	~January 1977	~2 years, 306 days	U.S. Army	
11	Philip D. Shutler	Major General; Philip D. Shutler (1926–2025)	~January 1977	~July 1978	~1 year, 181 days	U.S. Marine Corps	
12	James E. Dalton	Major General; James E. Dalton (1930–2024)	July 1978	~July 1980	~2 years	U.S. Air Force	
13	Charles W. Dyke	Major General; Charles W. Dyke (1935–2025)	~July 1980	1982	~1 year, 364 days	U.S. Army	
14	George B. Crist	Major General; George B. Crist (1931–2024)	1982	~June 1984	~1 year, 337 days	U.S. Marine Corps	
15	Bradley C. Hosmer	Major General; Bradley C. Hosmer (born 1937)	June 1984	September 1986	~2 years	U.S. Air Force	
16	Howard D. Graves	Major General; Howard D. Graves (1939–2003)	~September 1986	~September 1987	~1 year, 0 days	U.S. Army	
17	Richard B. Goetze	Major General; Richard B. Goetze (born 1935)	September 1987	~December 1989	~2 years, 91 days	U.S. Air Force	
18	Gene A. Deegan	Major General; Gene A. Deegan (born 1936)	~December 1989	~January 1992	~2 years, 31 days	U.S. Marine Corps	
19	Rudolph Ostovich III	Major General; Rudolph Ostovich III (born 1941)	~January 1992	~June 1993	~1 year, 151 days	U.S. Army	
20	Charles T. Robertson Jr.	Major General; Charles T. Robertson Jr. (born 1946)	June 1993	June 1995	~2 years	U.S. Air Force	
21	Carlton W. Fulford Jr.	Major General; Carlton W. Fulford Jr. (born 1944)	~June 1995	~June 1996	~1 year	U.S. Marine Corps	
22	Stephen T. Rippe	Major General; Stephen T. Rippe	~June 1996	June 1999	~3 years	U.S. Army	
23	Garry R. Trexler	Major General; Garry R. Trexler	June 1999	August 2001	~2 years, 61 days	U.S. Air Force	
24	James A. Hawkins	Major General; James A. Hawkins	September 2001	December 2003	~2 years, 91 days	U.S. Air Force	
25	Michael D. Maples	Major General; Michael D. Maples (born 1971)	December 2003	October 2005	~1 year, 304 days	U.S. Army	
26	Scott S. Custer	Major General; Scott S. Custer	October 2005	February 2007	~1 year, 123 days	U.S. Air Force	
27	Stephen M. Goldfein	Major General; Stephen M. Goldfein	February 2007	28 July 2008	~1 year, 178 days	U.S. Air Force	
28	Walter E. Gaskin	Major General; Walter E. Gaskin	28 July 2008	May 2009	~277 days	U.S. Marine Corps	
29	Bruce E. Grooms	Rear Admiral; Bruce E. Grooms (born 1958)	May 2009	November 2010	~1 year, 184 days	U.S. Navy	
30	Craig A. Franklin	Major General; Craig A. Franklin	November 2010	~30 March 2012	~1 year, 150 days	U.S. Air Force	
31	Nora W. Tyson	Rear Admiral; Nora W. Tyson (born 1957)	~30 March 2012	July 2013	~1 year, 93 days	U.S. Navy	
32	Frederick S. Rudesheim	Major General; Frederick S. Rudesheim	~July 2013	February 2015	~1 year, 215 days	U.S. Army	
33	Jacqueline Van Ovost	Major General; Jacqueline Van Ovost (born 1965)	February 2015	August 2017	~2 years, 181 days	U.S. Air Force	
34	Mike Dumont	Rear Admiral; Mike Dumont	~August 2017	August 2018	~1 year	U.S. Navy	
35	Glen D. VanHerck	Major General; Glen D. VanHerck (born 1962)	August 2018	~26 September 2019	~1 year, 56 days	U.S. Air Force	
36	William D. Byrne Jr.	Rear Admiral; William D. Byrne Jr.	26 September 2019	10 May 2021	1 year, 226 days	U.S. Navy	
37	George Wikoff	Rear Admiral; George Wikoff (born 1968)	10 May 2021	May 2023	~2 years, 5 days	U.S. Navy	
38	Michael L. Downs	Major General; Michael L. Downs (born c. 1971)	May 2023	October 2024	~1 year, 139 days	U.S. Air Force	
39	Stephen E. Liszewski	Major General; Stephen E. Liszewski	October 2024	21 July 2025	~293 days	U.S. Marine Corps	
40	Paul C. Spedero Jr.	Rear Admiral; Paul C. Spedero Jr.	21 July 2025	16 July 2026	360 days	U.S. Navy	
41	Sean M. Choquette	Major General; Sean M. Choquette	~16 July 2026	Incumbent	~99 days	U.S. Air Force	

== See also ==
- Director of the Joint Staff
- Joint Staff
