= Stanley E. Clarke III =

United States Air Force general

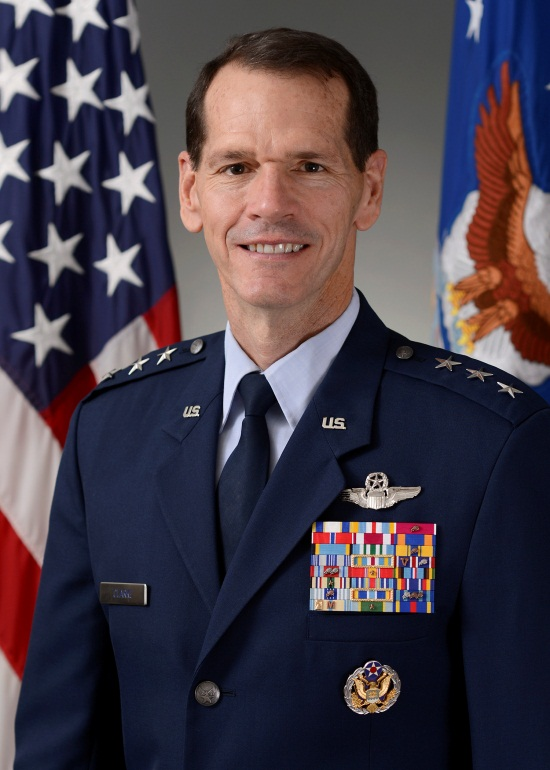
- Military career
- Allegiance: United States
- Branch: United States Air Force
- Service years: 1981–2016
- Rank: Lieutenant general
- Commands: Air National Guard; First Air Force; 187th Fighter Wing; 160th Fighter Squadron
- Conflicts: Iraq War
- Awards: Air Force Distinguished Service Medal (2); Defense Superior Service Medal; Legion of Merit (2); Bronze Star Medal

Stanley E. Clarke III is a retired United States Air Force lieutenant general and former director of the Air National Guard. In that position, he was the highest-ranking member of the Air National Guard and reported directly to the Chief of the National Guard Bureau.

== Military career ==
Clarke was commissioned as a second lieutenant in the United States Air Force following his graduation from the University of Georgia with a Bachelor of Science degree in 1981. He is a Command Pilot and has flown over 4,000 hours (including over 100 combat hours) in the A-10 Thunderbolt, F-16 Fighting Falcon, and C-26 Metroliner. He served in a number of leadership positions, including commander of the 160th Fighter Squadron, commander of the 187th Fighter Wing, deputy director of the Air National Guard, Defense Attache in Turkey, assistant adjutant general of the Alabama National Guard, and commander of the First Air Force. In 2007, he completed a Master of Arts degree in military studies at the American Military University.

In May 2013, Clarke was promoted to lieutenant general and became the director of the Air National Guard. He was relieved of this assignment on 18 December 2015, and retired from the United States Air Force on 1 March 2016.

Military offices
Preceded by Harry M. Wyatt III	Director of the Air National Guard; 2013–2015	Succeeded by L. Scott Rice
