= Giovanni K. Tuck =

Retired US Air Force general

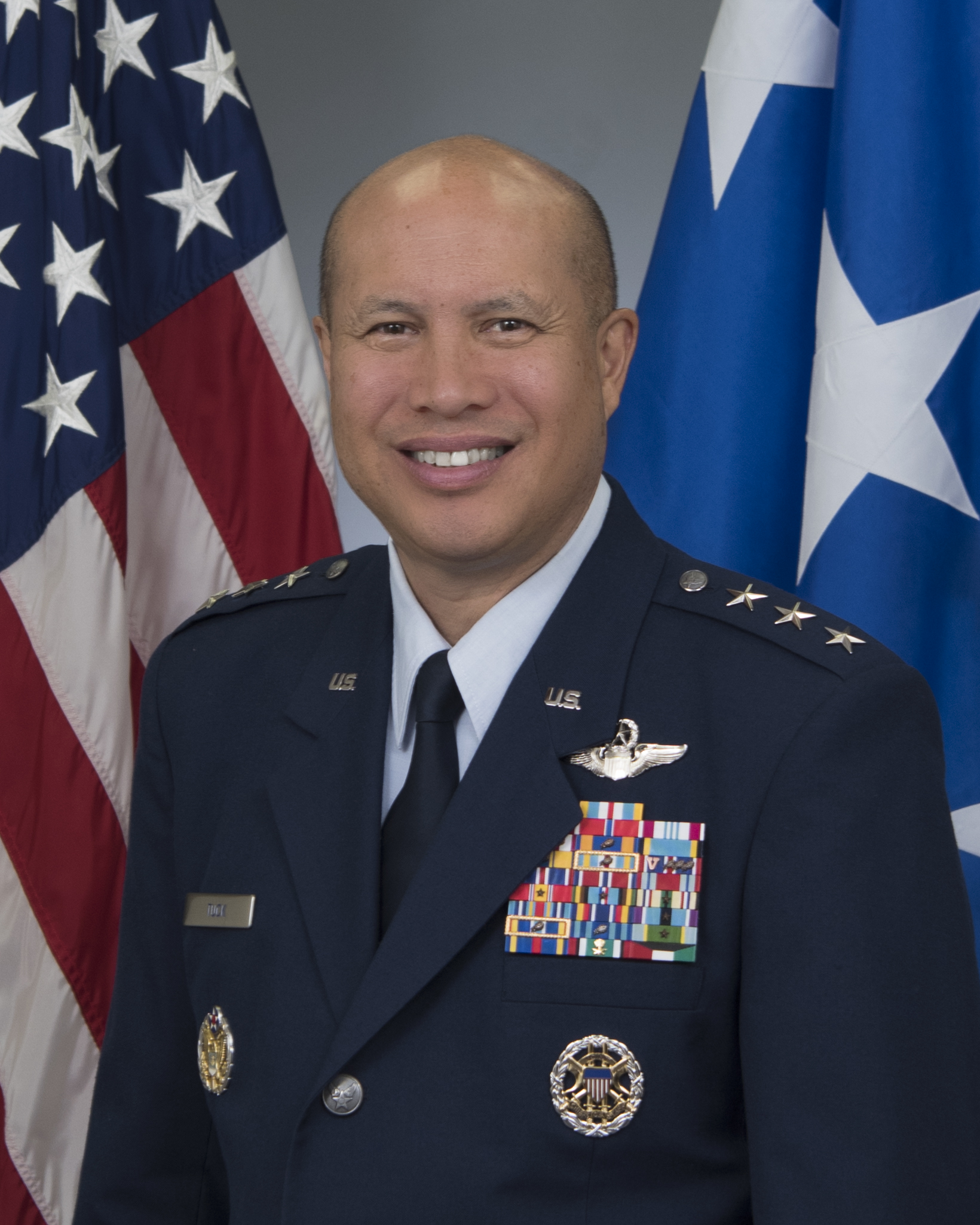
- Military career
- Allegiance: United States
- Branch: United States Air Force
- Service years: 1987–2020
- Rank: Lieutenant General
- Commands: 18th Air Force; Defense Logistics Agency; 379th Air Expeditionary Wing; 15th Airlift Wing; 905th Air Refueling Squadron
- Awards: Defense Superior Service Medal; Legion of Merit; Bronze Star Medal

Giovanni K. Tuck is a retired United States Air Force lieutenant general who last served as the director for logistics of the Joint Staff. In his position, he integrates logistics planning and execution in support of global operations and assists the Chairman of the Joint Chiefs of Staff in fulfilling his responsibilities. Prior to that, he was commander of the Eighteenth Air Force.

In July 2020, Major General Sam C. Barrett, who replaced him as commander of the 18th Air Force, was nominated to succeed him as director for logistics of the Joint Staff.

Military offices
Preceded by Rowayne A. Schatz Jr.	Director of Operations and Plans of the United States Transportation Command; 2015–2017	Succeeded by Brian S. Robinson
Preceded by Samuel D. Cox	Commander of the Eighteenth Air Force; 2017–2018	Succeeded by Sam C. Barrett
Preceded by Stephen R. Lyons	Director for Logistics of the Joint Staff; 2018–2020	Succeeded by Sam C. Barrett
