= Sean M. Jenkins =

U.S. Army general

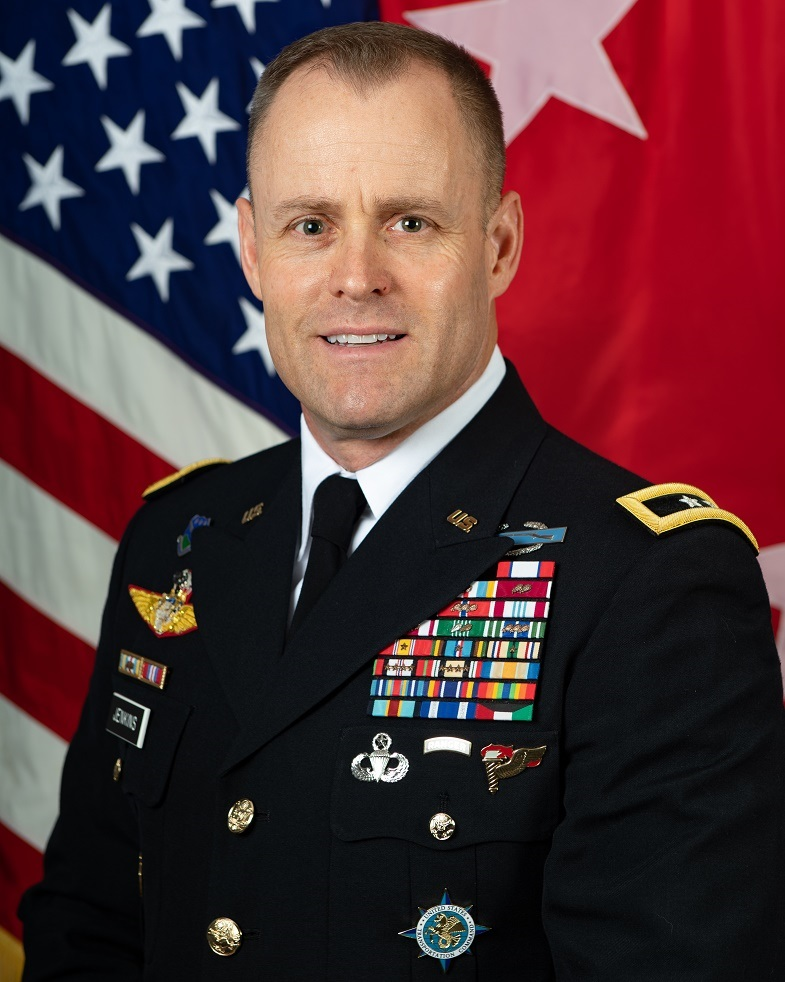
- Official portrait, 2019
- Born: February 22, 1966 (age 60); Massachusetts, U.S.
- Military career
- Allegiance: United States
- Branch: United States Army
- Rank: Major General
- Commands: Joint Enabling Capabilities Command

Sean Michael Jenkins (born February 22, 1966) is a United States Army major general who most recently served as the commander of the Joint Enabling Capabilities Command since July 2019 to July 2021. Prior to that, he served as the Chief of the Office of Security Cooperation-Iraq.

Military offices
Preceded by Jeffrey L. Harrigian	Deputy Director of Operations of the United States Central Command; 2015–2016	Succeeded by Paul Bontrager
Preceded by Warren E. Phipps Jr.	Deputy Commanding General of the United States Army Installation Management Command; 2017–2018	Succeeded by Timothy McGuire
Preceded by Bradley A. Becker	Chief of the Office of Security Cooperation-Iraq; 2018–2019	Succeeded by ???
Preceded by Lenny J. Richoux	Commander of the Joint Enabling Capabilities Command; 2019–present	Succeeded by Paul C. Spedero Jr.
