= Lenny J. Richoux =

Retired US Air Force general (born c. 1967)

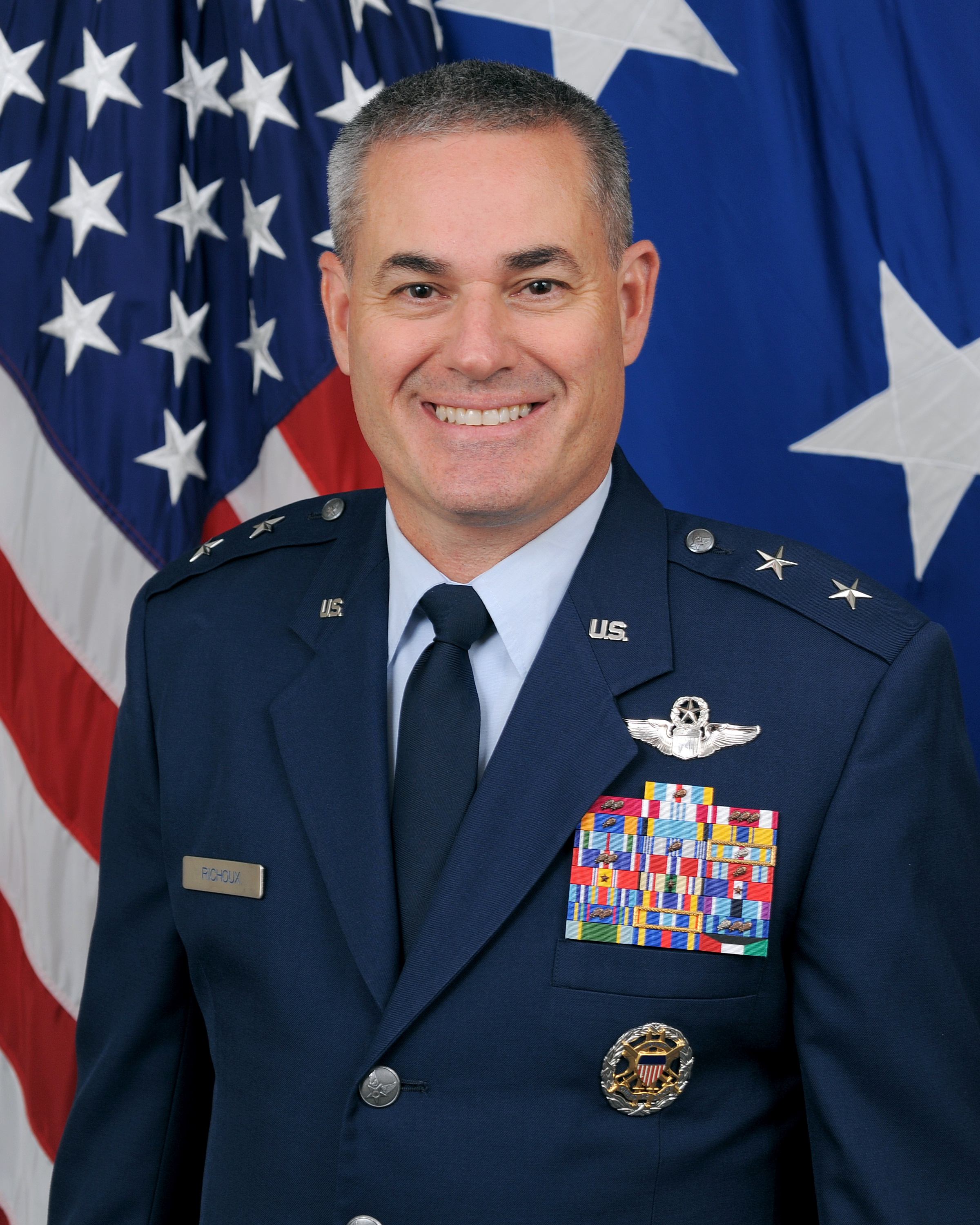
- Major General Lenny J. Richoux, USAF, c. 2018
- Born: c. 1967 (age 58–59)
- Alma mater: Georgia Institute of Technology (BS); George Washington University (MA)
- Military career
- Allegiance: United States
- Branch: United States Air Force
- Service years: 1990–2022
- Rank: Major General
- Commands: Joint Enabling Capabilities Command; 6th Air Mobility Wing; 816th Expeditionary Airlift Squadron; 17th Airlift Squadron
- Conflicts: Gulf War
- Awards: Defense Superior Service Medal (2); Legion of Merit (3)

Lenny J. Richoux is a retired United States Air Force major general who most recently served as the Director for Manpower and Personnel of the Joint Staff. Prior to that, he was the commander of the Joint Enabling Capabilities Command of the United States Transportation Command.

Richoux was commissioned through Air Force ROTC at Georgia Institute of Technology. He began his flying career at Loring Air Force Base, Maine, and has primarily flown the C-17 Globemaster and KC-135 Stratotanker. He has commanded a joint unit, an Air Force wing and squadron and served as a vice wing commander. Richoux has deployed in support of multiple operations around the globe, primarily throughout the Middle East. He has served in several key staff billets, including the Joint Staff, Combatant Commands, NATO and Air Staff.

Richoux is a command pilot with over 3,200 flight hours.

== Education ==
- 1989 Bachelor of Science, Aerospace Engineering, Georgia Institute of Technology, Atlanta
- 1994 U.S. Air Force Flight Safety Officer School, Kirtland Air Force Base, N.M.
- 1995 Squadron Officer School, Maxwell AFB, Ala., by correspondence
- 1997 Master of Arts, Organizational Management, George Washington University, Washington, D.C.
- 1997 Squadron Officer School, Maxwell AFB, Ala.
- 2003 Air Command and Staff College, Maxwell AFB, Ala.
- 2005 Air War College, Maxwell AFB, Ala., by correspondence
- 2005 U.S. Air Force Chief of Safety Course, Kirtland AFB, N.M.
- 2007 Maintenance Course for Operational Commanders, Sheppard AFB, Texas
- 2008 National Defense Fellow, The Center for a New American Security, Washington, D.C.
- 2009 Senior Leader Maintenance Course, Scott AFB, Ill.
- 2010 Joint and Combined Warfighting School, Joint Forces Staff College, Norfolk, Va.
- 2011 Enterprise Leadership Seminar, University of Virginia, Charlottesville
- 2015 Senior Leader Orientation Course, Andrews AFB, Md.
- 2015 Capstone Course for General Officers, Joint Military Education III, Fort Lesley J. McNair, Washington, D.C.
- 2016 Joint Flag Officer Warfighting Course, Maxwell AFB, Ala.
- 2016 Director of Mobility Forces Training Course, Hurlburt Field, Fla.
- 2017 Continuous Process Improvement for Executives, Washington, D.C.
- 2018 Joint Force Air Component Commander Course, Maxwell AFB, Ala.

== Military assignments ==
1. June 1990 – August 1991, Student, Undergraduate Pilot Training, Columbus Air Force Base, Miss.
2. November 1991 – May 1992, Student, KC-135 Combat Crew Training, Castle AFB, Calif.
3. May 1992 – October 1993, KC-135R Pilot, 42nd Air Refueling Squadron, Loring AFB, Maine
4. October 1993 – July 1995, KC-135 R/T Aircraft Commander, 93rd Air Refueling Squadron, Fairchild AFB, Wash.
5. August 1995 – May 1997, Air Force Intern Program, Headquarters U.S. Air Force, Arlington, Va.
6. June 1997 – April 2001, Wing Executive Officer and C-17 Lead Airdrop Evaluator Pilot, 437th Airlift Wing and 14th Airlift Squadron, Charleston AFB, S.C.
7. May 2001 – June 2002, Future Concepts Strategic Planner, Deputy Chief of Staff, Plans and Programs, Headquarters U.S. Air Force, Arlington, Va.
8. July 2002 – June 2003, Student, Air Command and Staff College, Maxwell AFB, Ala.
9. June 2003 – April 2005, War Planner, Operations Directorate, J-3, Joint Chiefs of Staff, Arlington, Va.
10. August 2005 – January 2006, Chief of Wing Safety, 437th Airlift Wing, Charleston AFB, S.C.
11. January 2006 – June 2007, Commander, 17th Airlift Squadron, Charleston AFB, S.C.
(June 2006 – September 2006, Commander, 816th Expeditionary Airlift Squadron, Al Udeid Air Base, Qatar)
12. July 2007 – May 2008, National Defense Fellow, The Center for a New American Security, Washington, D.C.
13. May 2008 – December 2008, Division Chief, Strategy and Plans, Directorate of Communication, Secretary of the Air Force, Arlington, Va.
14. December 2008 – July 2010, Vice Commander, 18th Wing, Kadena AB, Okinawa, Japan
15. July 2010 – July 2012, Commander, 6th Air Mobility Wing, MacDill AFB, Fla.
16. August 2012 – July 2014, Executive Assistant and Senior Special Assistant to the Supreme Allied Commander Europe and Commander U.S. European Command, Headquarters EUCOM, with duty at Supreme Headquarters Allied Powers Europe, Mons, Belgium
17. July 2014 – July 2015, Director, Colonel Management Office, Headquarters U.S. Air Force, Arlington, Va.
18. July 2015 – July 2016, Director of Air Force Services, Headquarters U.S. Air Force, Arlington, Va.
19. August 2016 – June 2017, Vice Commander, 18th Air Force, Scott AFB, Ill.
20. July 2017 – July 2019, Commander, Joint Enabling Capabilities Command, U.S. Transportation Command, Norfolk, Va.
21. August 2019 – retirement, Director, Manpower and Personnel, Joint Staff, Arlington, Va.

== Effective dates of promotion ==
| Insignia | Rank | Date of rank |
|---|---|---|
| | Second Lieutenant | January 25, 1990 |
| | First Lieutenant | January 25, 1992 |
| | Captain | January 25, 1994 |
| | Major | April 1, 2001 |
| | Lieutenant Colonel | May 1, 2005 |
| | Colonel | October 1, 2008 |
| | Brigadier General | June 5, 2015 |
| | Major General | August 17, 2018 |

Military offices
| Preceded by ??? | Vice Commander of the Eighteenth Air Force; 2016–2017 | Succeeded by Darren V. James |
| Preceded by Sam C. Barrett | Commander of the Joint Enabling Capabilities Command; 2017–2019 | Succeeded by Sean M. Jenkins |
| Preceded by Sara A. Joyner | Director for Manpower and Personnel of the Joint Staff; 2019–2022 | Succeeded by David T. Isaacson |
