= Louis Joseph Kirn =

American Navy officer (1908–1995)

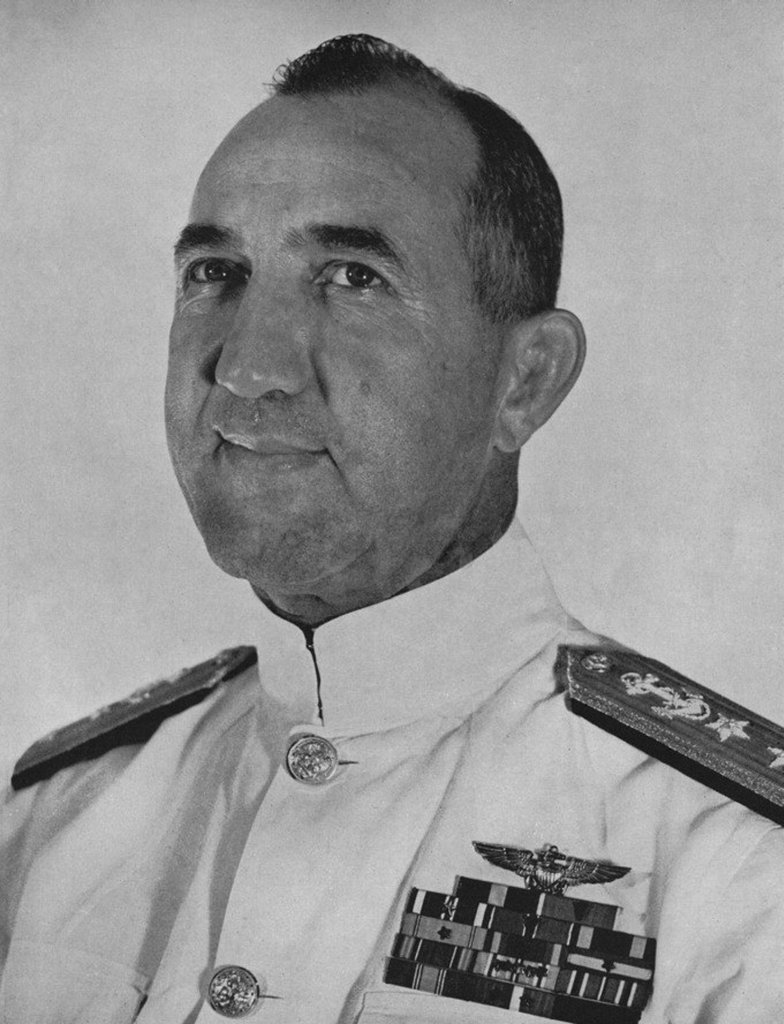
- Kirn, c. 1950s–1960s
- Nickname(s): "Bullet Lou Kirn"
- Born: June 8, 1908; Milwaukee, Wisconsin, US
- Died: November 17, 1995 (aged 87)
- Allegiance: United States
- Branch: Navy
- Rank: Rear admiral
- Battles / wars: World War II; Pacific War; Solomon Islands campaign; Battle of Edson's Ridge; Guadalcanal campaign; Mariana and Palau Islands campaign; Battle of Peleliu; Volcano and Ryukyu Islands campaign; Battle of Iwo Jima; Philippines campaign (1944–1945)
- Awards: Navy Cross; Navy Distinguished Service Medal; Legion of Merit (2); Distinguished Flying Cross

Louis Joseph Kirn (June 8, 1908 – November 17, 1995), nicknamed "Bullet Lou Kirn", was an American Navy officer.

== Biography ==
Kirn was born on June 8, 1908, in Milwaukee, Wisconsin. He attended the Peddie School in New Jersey. He attended the United States Naval Academy, playing halfback for the Army Black Knights, playing against the Notre Dame Fighting Irish, and graduated in 1932. He served on the USS Tennessee until December 1935. He then received flight training at Naval Air Station Pensacola, and was commissioned as a Naval aviator on January 6, 1936. He served in Fighter Squadron 1, on the USS Langley and later the USS Lexington, from February 1936 to June 1937. He was then assigned to VA-35, and served on the USS Saratoga.

During World War II, he fought in the Guadalcanal and Solomon Islands campaigns. After returning, he commanded VPB-4. In May 1944, he served on the USS Franklin, USS Enterprise, and USS Hancock, and fought in the Battle of Peleliu, Iwo Jima and the Philippines campaign.

From January to December 1966, he served as the Vice Director of the Joint Staff. He died on November 17, 1995, aged 87.
