= Stephen M. Goldfein =

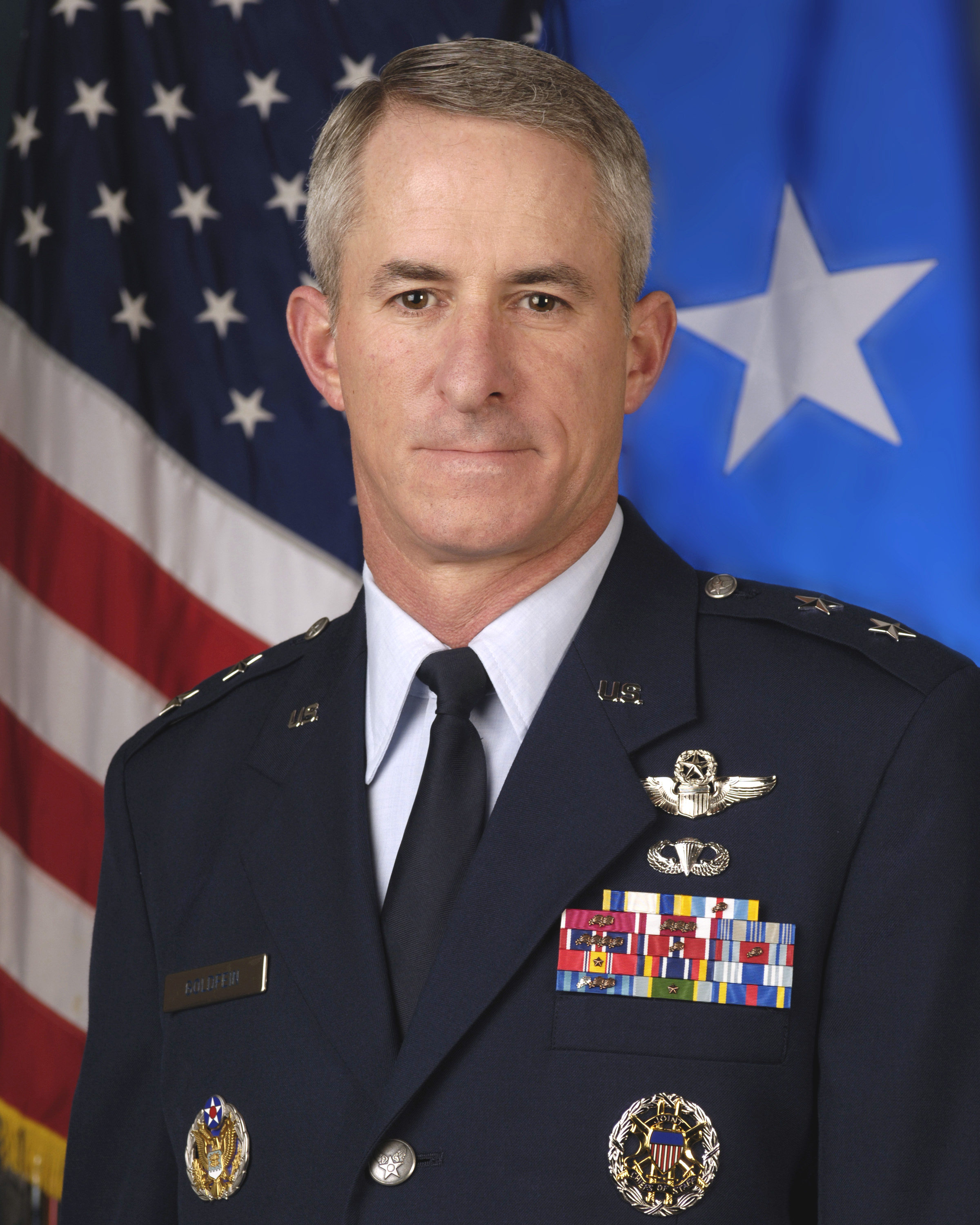
- Major General Stephen M. Goldfein
- Relatives: David L. Goldfein (Brother)
- Military career
- Allegiance: United States
- Branch: United States Air Force
- Service years: 1978–2008
- Rank: Major General
- Commands: Vice Director of the Joint Staff; Vice Commander, Air Combat Command; Commander, United States Air Force Warfare Center
- Conflicts: Gulf War; Operation Allied Force
- Awards: Defense Distinguished Service Medal; Defense Superior Service Medal; Legion of Merit

Stephen M. Goldfein is a retired Major General in the United States Air Force who previously served as Vice Director of the Joint Staff and Vice Commander of Air Combat Command. Goldfein is the brother of the 21st Chief of Staff of the United States Air Force General David L. Goldfein.

== Career ==
Major General Stephen M. Goldfein began his career in the United States Air Force in 1978 following his graduation from the United States Air Force Academy and was commissioned in 1978. In 1998, Goldfein commanded its fellow Airmen from 10 bases within the Pacific theater on the first Air Expeditionary Force deployment which provide precision air-strike capability from Kwang-Ju, South Korea. Goldfein oversaw the conversion of a bare base to a full F-15E fighter wing operation. In 1999, Goldfein assisted Air Force Chiefs of Staff Michael E. Ryan in Operation Allied Force strategic planning and direction. During the September 11, 2001, attacks, Goldfein was the commander of the 1st Fighter Wing and was the first active-duty to response to the terrorist attacks at that time.

The following year in 2002, Goldfein conducted early strategic planning exercises for the Chairman of the Joint Chiefs of Staff, General Richard B. Myers, for Operations Enduring Freedom and Operation Iraqi Freedom. In 2004 Goldfein was appointed as the Commander of the United States Air Force Warfare Center and oversaw all Predator operations in support of operations Enduring Freedom and Iraqi Freedom as well as supervising all training and development programs. In 2006 Goldfein was appointed as the Vice Commander of Air Combat Command which was the primary provider of air combat forces for the Air Force. In 2007 Goldfein was appointed as Vice Director of the Joint Chiefs of Staff and was assigned in The Pentagon, Washington, D.C.

On August 10, 2008, Goldfein retired from active-duty service in the United States Air Force, following 30 years of service.

== Flight Information ==
Rating: Command pilot

Flight Hours: 3,900

Aircraft flown: T-41, T-37, T-38, F-15 A/B/C/D, F-15E, F-18F, C-12, C-130, E-3B, B-2 and B-1B

== Effective dates of promotion ==
| Rank | Date |
|---|---|
| Second lieutenant | June 1, 1978 |
| First lieutenant | June 1, 1980 |
| Captain | June 1, 1982 |
| Major | April 1, 1987 |
| Lieutenant colonel | July 1, 1991 |
| Colonel | February 1, 1995 |
| Brigadier general | April 1, 2002 |
| Major general | September 1, 2005 |
