= Paul Spedero Jr. =

U.S. Navy admiral

Paul C. Spedero Jr.
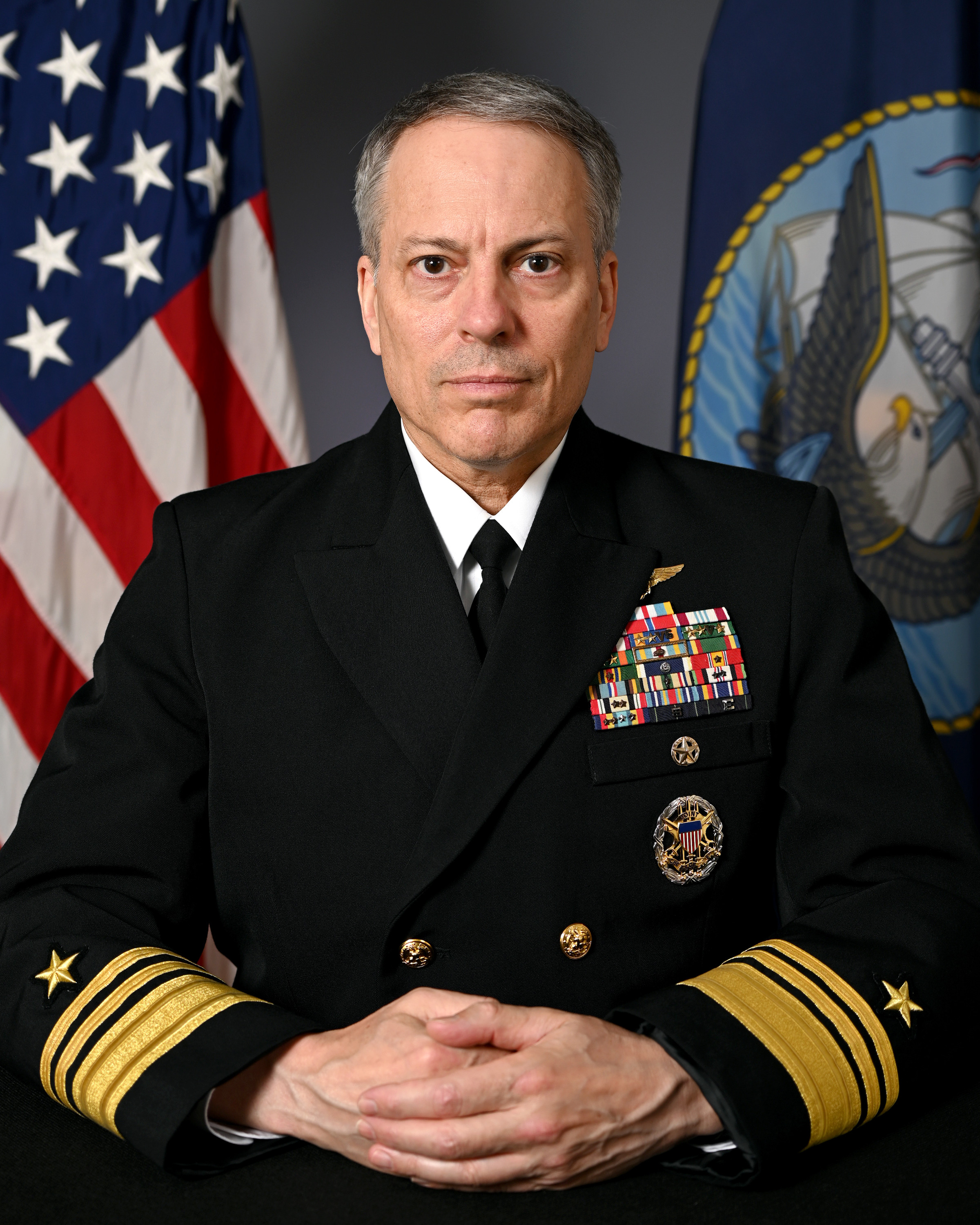
- Born: 1968 (age 57–58)
- Alma mater: Rensselaer Polytechnic Institute (BS); Naval War College (MA); Old Dominion University (MS); Defense Language Institute
- Military career
- Allegiance: United States
- Branch: United States Navy
- Service years: 1990–present
- Rank: Vice Admiral
- Commands: Director of the Joint Staff; Vice Director of the Joint Staff; Joint Enabling Capabilities Command; Carrier Strike Group 8; USS Dwight D. Eisenhower (CVN-69); USS Peleliu (LHA-5); VFA-86
- Awards: Legion of Merit (2); Bronze Star Medal

Paul C. Spedero Jr. (born 1968) is a United States Navy Vice Admiral and naval aviator who has served as the Director of the Joint Staff since July 2026. He most recently served as the Vice Director of the Joint Staff from 2025 to 2026. He served as the commander of Carrier Strike Group 8 from 2022 to 2023, as commander of the Joint Enabling Capabilities Command from 2021 to 2022, and prior to that as director for fleet integrated readiness and analysis on the staff of the United States Fleet Forces Command.

Spedero's command tours include serving as commanding officer of the USS Dwight D. Eisenhower (CVN-69) from 2015 to 2018, commanding officer of USS Peleliu (LHA-5) from 2013 to its decommissioning in 2015 and commander of the "Sidewinders" of Strike Fighter Squadron (VFA)-86.

A native of Springfield, Massachusetts, Spedero earned his commission from the NROTC program in Rensselaer Polytechnic Institute in 1990 with a B.S. degree in mechanical engineering, and was designated a naval aviator in 1992. He earned an M.A. degree in National Security and Strategic Studies from the Naval War College, an M.S. degree in Engineering Management from Old Dominion University, and a degree in French from the Defense Language Institute.

In February 2023, he was nominated for promotion to rear admiral. In July 2025, he was assigned as vice director of the Joint Staff.

== Awards and decorations ==

Naval Aviator Badge
Defense Superior Service Medal
Legion of Merit with award star	Bronze Star Medal	Defense Meritorious Service Medal
Meritorious Service Medal with award star	Air Medal with strike/flight numeral "6" device,"V" device and two award stars	Navy and Marine Corps Commendation Medal with "V" device and two award stars
Navy and Marine Corps Achievement Medal	Joint Meritorious Unit Award with oak leaf cluster	Navy Unit Commendation ribbon
Navy Meritorious Unit Commendation with bronze service star	Battle Effectiveness Award 4th award	National Defense Service Medal with bronze service star
Armed Forces Expeditionary Medal	Southwest Asia Service Medal with bronze service star	Afghanistan Campaign Medal with two bronze service stars
Iraq Campaign Medal with two bronze service stars	Global War on Terrorism Expeditionary Medal	Global War on Terrorism Service Medal
Navy and Marine Corps Sea Service Deployment Ribbon with eight service stars	Navy Expert Rifle Marksmanship Medal	Navy Expert Pistol Marksmanship Medal
Command at Sea insignia
Joint Chiefs of Staff Identification Badge

Military offices
Preceded by John D. Deehr	Commanding Officer of USS Peleliu (LHA-5); 2013–2015	Vessel decommissioned
Preceded by Stephen T. Koehler	Commanding Officer of USS Dwight D. Eisenhower (CVN-69); 2015–2018	Succeeded by Kyle P. Higgins
Preceded by ???	Director of Fleet and Joint Training of the United States Fleet Forces Command; 2018–2019	Succeeded by John A. Hefti
Preceded by Douglas G. Perry	Director of Joint and Fleet Operations of the United States Fleet Forces Command; 2019–2021	Succeeded by Jeffrey J. Czerewko
Preceded by Sean M. Jenkins	Commander of the Joint Enabling Capabilities Command; 2021–2022	Succeeded by Stephen F. Jost
Preceded by Curt A. Renshaw	Commander of Carrier Strike Group 8; 2022–2023	Succeeded by Sean R. Bailey
Preceded by Fred Kacher	Vice Director for Operations of the Joint Staff; 2023–2025	Succeeded by Sean M. Choquette
Preceded by Stephen E. Liszewski	Vice Director of the Joint Staff; 2025–present	Incumbent
