= 838th Air Expeditionary Advisory Group =

838th Air Expeditionary Advisory Group

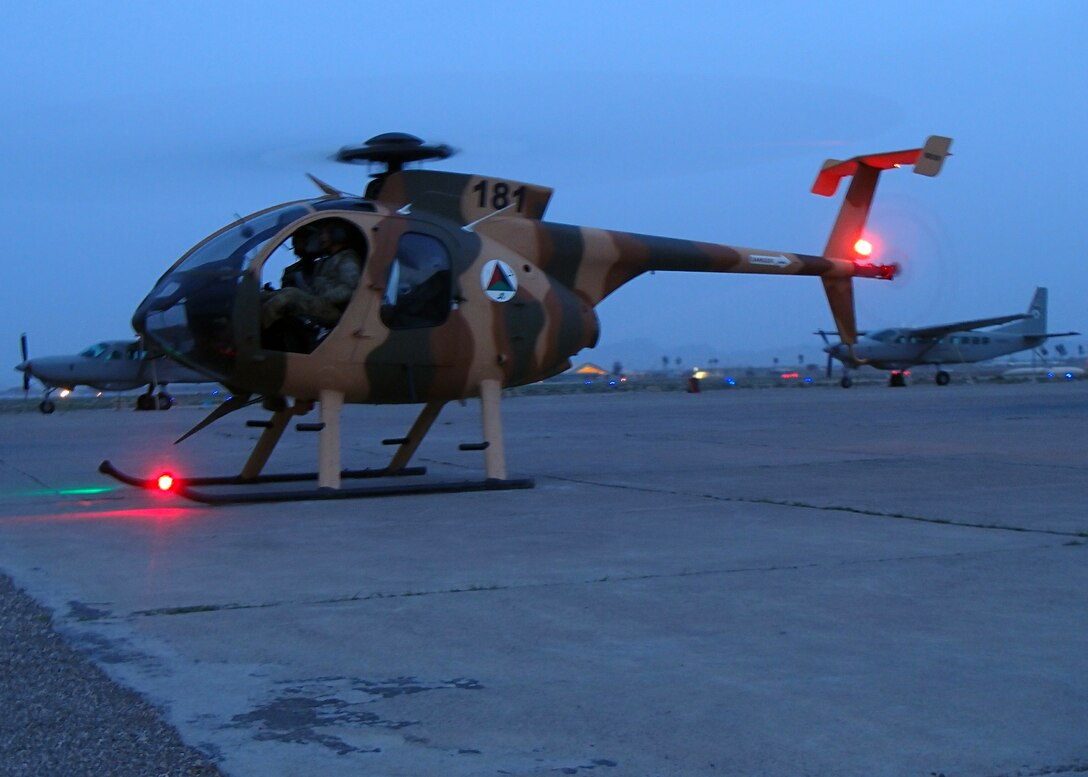
- An instructor from the squadron prepares to conduct a night vision goggle training mission with an Afghan Air Force student
- Country: United States
- Branch: United States Air Force
- Role: Training host country units
- Part of: United States Air Forces Central

Insignia
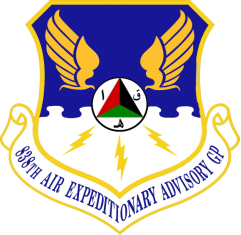
- 838th Air Expeditionary Advisory Group emblem

The 838th Air Expeditionary Advisory Group was the ISAF host unit at Shindand Air Base that as part of NATO Air Training Command - Afghanistan was training and advising the Afghan Air Force Shindand Air Wing. It was a group of the United States Air Force under the 438th Air Expeditionary Wing headquartered at Kabul.

Advisors from the group have conducted humanitarian missions around Shindand Air Base.

In mid 2011 the group received equipment (tents, environmental control units, latrine systems, shower systems, generators and electrical equipment) from FOB Delaram II to create a new camp for approximately 300 additional incoming personnel being deployed to Shindand.

== Units ==
- Italian Airbase Support Air Advisory Team (civil engineering, computers, basic networking, POL, fire fighting, medical, personnel, intelligence)
- 444th Air Expeditionary Advisory Squadron

the 444th Squadron provided training in helicopters and light Cessna 182 aircraft to the Afghan Air Force. This included training with the use of night vision goggle while flying the MH-6 Little Bird at Shindand Air Base.

- 445th Air Expeditionary Advisory Squadron (communications; transferred to 47th Garrison Command)
- Expeditionary Security Forces Squadron (ESFS) (base defense function transferred to 47th Garrison Command, September 2012)
- Detachment 1 at Herat
- 801st Air Expeditionary Advisory Squadron (helicopters)
- 802d Air Expeditionary Advisory Squadron (training trainers and maintainers)
- 803rd Air Expeditionary Advisory Squadron (fixed-wing; was 444th Air Expeditionary Advisory Squadron)
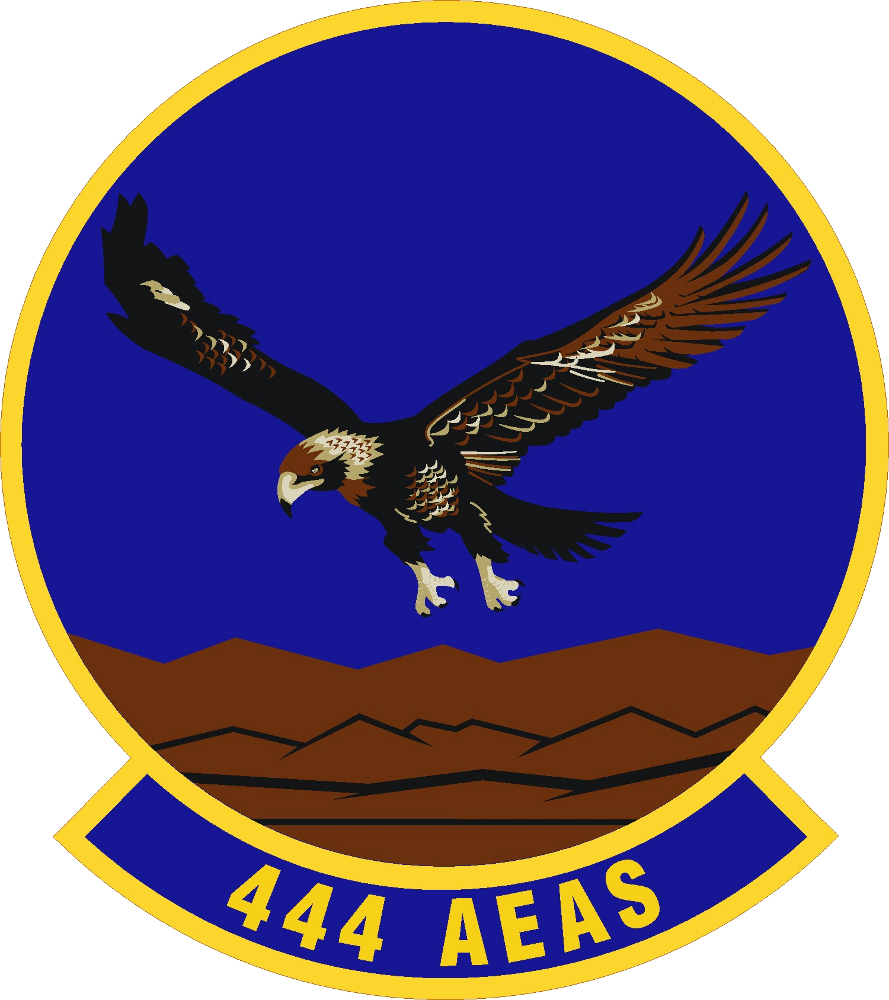
444 AEAS

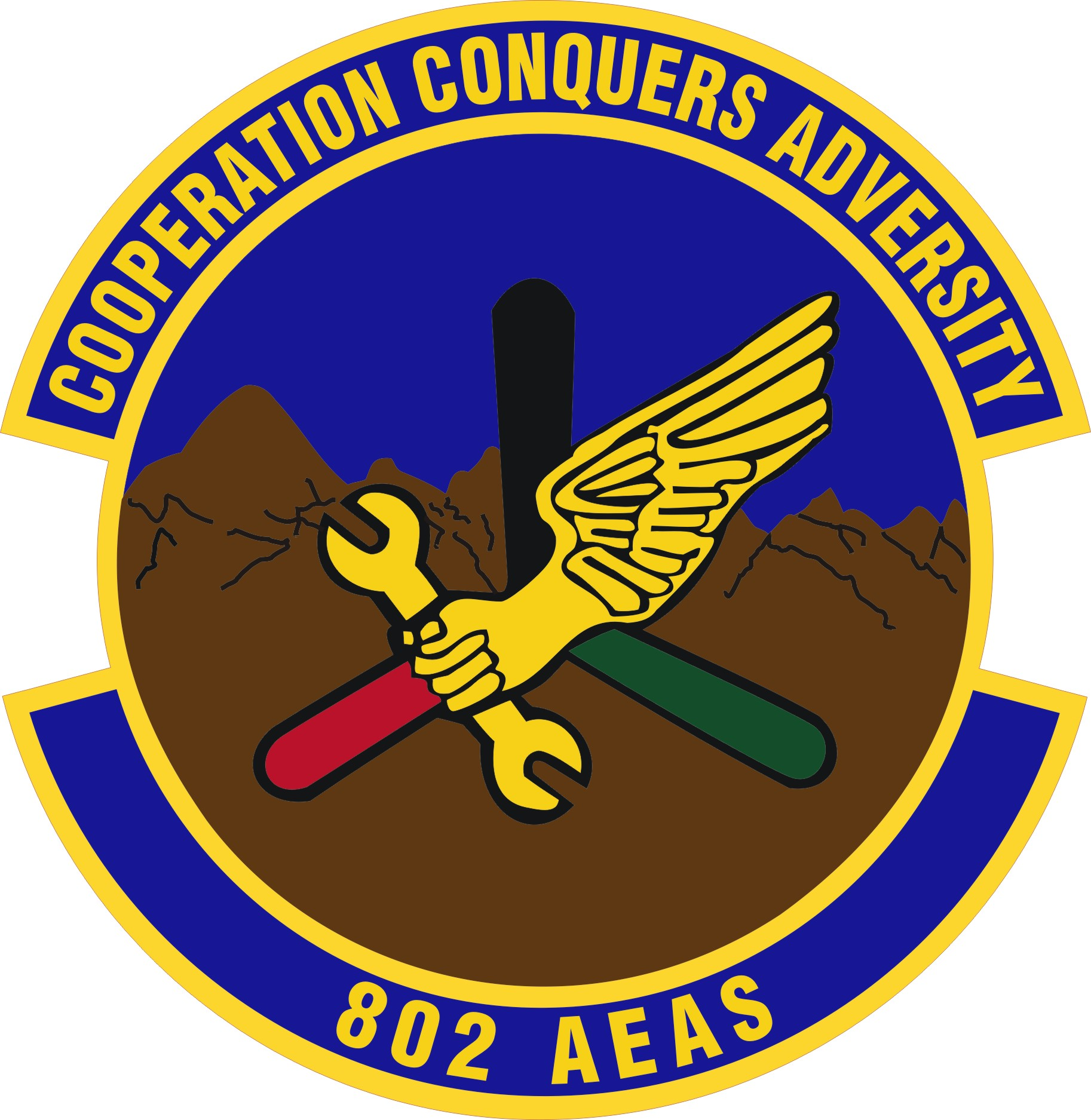
802 AEAS
- Army Colonel Michael Senters, unknown - 13 July 2010
- Colonel Larry Bowers, 14 July 2010 - 15 July 2011
- Colonel John Hokaj, 16 July 2011 - 30 June 2012
- Colonel David Gossett, 1 July 2012 - 1 July 2013

== Awards ==
Air Force Meritorious Unit Award

- 1 May 2011 - 30 April 2012
- 1 May 2012 - 30 April 2013
- 1 October 2013 - 30 September 2014
- 1 October 2014 - 6 February 2015
