= Daniel Lasica =

Daniel T. Lasica
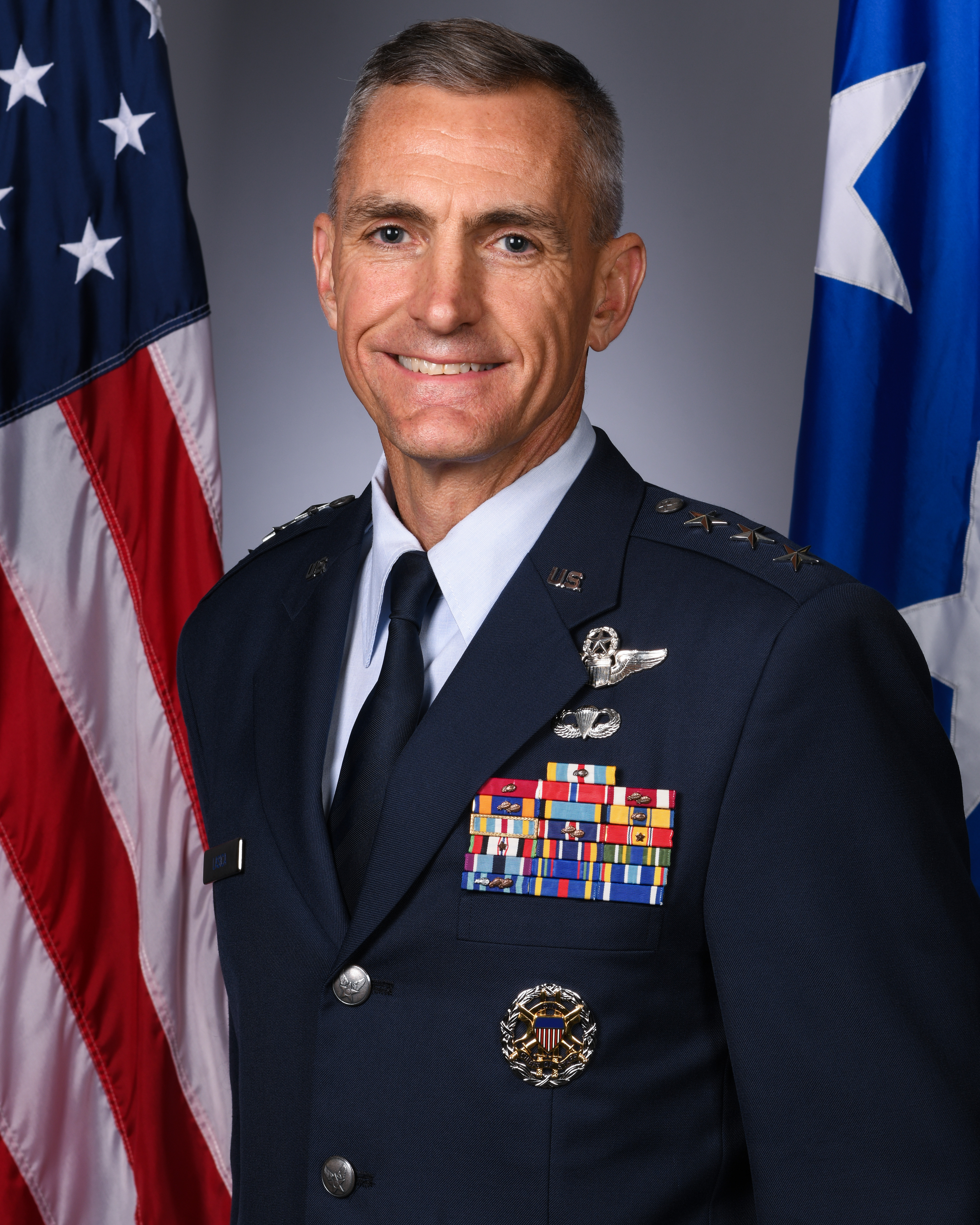
- Official portrait, 2026
- Education: United States Air Force Academy; Embry–Riddle Aeronautical University; College of Naval Command and Staff; School of Advanced Military Studies
- Military career
- Allegiance: United States
- Branch: United States Air Force
- Service years: 1994–
- Rank: Lieutenant General
- Commands: United States Air Forces Central Command; Ninth Air Force; 9th Air and Space Expeditionary Task Force; 31st Fighter Wing; 20th Fighter Wing; 838th Air Expeditionary Advisory Group; 309th Fighter Squadron
- Conflicts: Iraqi no-fly zones conflict; Operation Southern Watch; War in Afghanistan; 2026 Iran war

Daniel T. Lasica is an American lieutenant general who has served as the commander of the Ninth Air Force and Air Forces Central since 2026.

Lasica was commissioned from the United States Air Force Academy in 1994. He achieved the Air Force rating of command pilot, with over 4,000 flight hours, including 220 in combat. He participated in Operation Southern Watch during the Iraqi no-fly zones conflict, and in the war in Afghanistan. His commands have included the 309th Fighter Squadron, 838th Air Expeditionary Advisory Group, 20th Fighter Wing, 31st Fighter Wing, and 9th Air and Space Expeditionary Task Force. He then served in several roles at the United States European Command.

He served as the US European Command's deputy chief of staff for operations from 2021 to 2022, director of plans, policy, strategy and capabilities from 2022 to 2024, and director of operations from 2024 to 2026. In these roles, he was involved in the US assistance to Ukraine during the Russo-Ukrainian war. As the commander of the Ninth Air Force, he is involved in the air campaign in the Iran war.

== Early life and education ==
Lasica was commissioned from the United States Air Force Academy in 1994, where he received a Bachelor of Science degree in civil engineering.

== Air Force career ==
Lasica underwent pilot training with the 37th Flying Training Squadron at Columbus Air Force Base, Mississippi, from December 1994 to May 1996. He was a T-37 instructor pilot in the 85th Flying Training Squadron at Laughlin Air Force Base, Texas, from May 1996 to December 1998. From May to December 1999, he underwent pilot training with the 308th Fighter Squadron at Luke Air Force Base, Arizona. Lasica then became an F-16 instructor pilot with several units. He was in the 523rd Fighter Squadron at Cannon Air Force Base, New Mexico, where he was also flight commander, from December 1999 to July 2002. Lasica completed the Squadron Officer School in 2000.

From July 2002 to September 2005, he was in the 308th Fighter Squadron and 56th Operations Group at Luke Air Force Base, where he was an F-16 instructor pilot, flight examiner, fight commander, and an assistant operations officer. That was followed by service in the 36th Fighter Squadron at Osan Air Base in South Korea, until July 2007, where Lasica was also tactics chief, Chief of Special Technical Operations, and Advanced Programs Manager of the Seventh Air Force. Lasica achieved the rating of command pilot, with over 4,000 flight hours, including 220 combat hours. He was involved in Operation Southern Watch.

In 2007 he received a Master of Aviation/Aerospace Operations degree from Embry–Riddle Aeronautical University. From August 2007 to June 2008, Lasica was a student at the College of Naval Command and Staff, Naval War College, where he received a Master of National Security and Strategic Studies degree. From July 2008 to August 2009, he was a student at the School of Advanced Military Studies, where he received a Master of Military Art and Science degree.

Lasica then became an F-16 instructor pilot and chief of safety for the 56th Fighter Wing at Luke AFB until May 2010. That month, he became commander of the 309th Fighter Squadron at Luke AFB, serving in that role until July 2012. Lasica then attended the Eisenhower School, graduating in June 2013 with a Master of National Security and Resource Strategy degree. In August 2013 he became commander of the 838th Air Expeditionary Advisory Group at Shindand Air Base, Islamic Republic of Afghanistan, until August 2014.

In September 2014 Lasica became the chief of operations and operations division chief at the Joint Staff in Washington, D.C., until August 2016. That month he became the commander of the 20th Fighter Wing at Shaw Air Force Base, South Carolina. He served in that role until June 2018, when he was made the commander of the 31st Fighter Wing at Aviano Air Base, Italy. In June 2020, Lasica became commander of the 9th Air and Space Expeditionary Task Force in Kabul, Islamic Republic of Afghanistan. He was in that role until July 2021.

Lasica served in several roles at the United States European Command in Stuttgart, Germany. These included Director of Current Operations and Deputy Chief of Staff for Operations, until July 2022; Director of Plans, Policy, Strategy and Capabilities, until July 2024; and Director of Operations, until August 2026. During his time in Europe, Lasica was involved in the US support to Ukraine amidst the Russo-Ukrainian war. On 5 August 2026, he took command of the Ninth Air Force and Air Forces Central from Lt. Gen. Derek France at Shaw AFB, South Carolina. He took the post amidst the air campaign during the 2026 Iran war.

== Dates of promotion ==
Rank	Branch	Date
Second lieutenant	Air Force	1 June 1994
First lieutenant	Air Force	1 June 1996
Captain	Air Force	1 June 1998
Major	Air Force	1 July 2004
Lieutenant colonel	Air Force	1 June 2008
Colonel	Air Force	1 October 2013
Brigadier general	Air Force	4 October 2018
Major general	Air Force	24 June 2022
Lieutenant general	Air Force	2026
