= List of directors of Joint Staff directorates =

Joint Staff
- Joint Chiefs of Staff Identification Badge

Agency overview
- Parent agency: Joint Chiefs of Staff
- Website: www.jcs.mil

The Joint Staff is organized as numbered directorates, each headed by its own director. The director of the Joint Staff supervises the entire organization, and reports to the chairman of the Joint Chiefs of Staff.

== History ==
The Joint Staff was established in 1947 to provide the Joint Chiefs of Staff with a small staff drawn equally from each of the armed services and supervised by the director of the Joint Staff. Initially the Joint Staff was organized as interservice committees held over from World War II, but in 1958 it was expanded and reorganized to form the numbered directorates of a conventional military staff: J-1 (personnel), J-2 (intelligence), J-3 (operations), J-4 (logistics), J-5 (plans and policy), J-6 (communications and electronics). Two more directorates were added in 1987: J-7 (operational plans and interoperability) and J-8 (force structure, resource, and assessment).

- The J-1 directorate was abolished in 1976 but reestablished in 1982.
- The J-2 directorate was abolished in 1963 and its functions were turned over to the Defense Intelligence Agency. It was reconstituted as a full Joint Staff directorate in 1991 and upgraded to three stars in 2021.
- The J-3, J-4, and J-5 directorates were upgraded to three stars in 1964.
- The J-6 directorate was abolished in 1976 but reestablished in 1979 as the C3S (command, control, and communications systems) directorate, a three-star billet that was redesignated J-6 in 1987. The directorate was abolished again in 2011 and supervised by the J-8 director during the wind-down, but was revived a few months later.
- The J-7 directorate was downgraded to one star in 2002 after much of its work was absorbed by Joint Forces Command (JFCOM). When JFCOM was disestablished in 2011, most of its functions returned to the J-7 directorate, which was upgraded to three stars.
- The J-8 directorate was upgraded to three stars in 1996.

== List of Joint Staff directors ==
Army	Navy	Air Force	Marine Corps	Space Force	Coast Guard

Year	Chairman, Joint Chiefs of Staff	Director, Joint Staff	Director, J1	Director, J2	Director, J3	Director, J4	Director, J5	Director, J6	Director, J7	Director, J8
2026	Gen. J. Daniel Caine	Vice Adm. Paul C. Spedero Jr.	Maj. Gen. Paige M. Jennings	Vice Adm. Thomas M. Henderschedt	Lt. Gen. David L. Odom	Lt. Gen. Keith D. Reventlow	(vacant)	Lt. Gen. David T. Isaacson	Lt. Gen. Stephen E. Liszewski	Lt. Gen. Steven P. Whitney
2026	Gen. J. Daniel Caine	Vice Adm. Paul C. Spedero Jr.	Maj. Gen. Paige M. Jennings	Vice Adm. Thomas M. Henderschedt	Lt. Gen. David L. Odom	Lt. Gen. Keith D. Reventlow	Lt. Gen. Brett G. Sylvia	Lt. Gen. David T. Isaacson	Lt. Gen. Stephen E. Liszewski	Lt. Gen. Steven P. Whitney
2026	Gen. J. Daniel Caine	(vacant)	Maj. Gen. Paige M. Jennings	Vice Adm. Thomas M. Henderschedt	Lt. Gen. David L. Odom	Vice Adm. Dion D. English	Lt. Gen. Brett G. Sylvia	Lt. Gen. David T. Isaacson	Lt. Gen. Stephen E. Liszewski	Lt. Gen. Steven P. Whitney
2026	Gen. J. Daniel Caine	Vice Adm. Frederick W. Kacher	Maj. Gen. Paige M. Jennings	Vice Adm. Thomas M. Henderschedt	Lt. Gen. David L. Odom	Vice Adm. Dion D. English	Lt. Gen. Brett G. Sylvia	Lt. Gen. David T. Isaacson	Lt. Gen. Stephen E. Liszewski	Lt. Gen. Steven P. Whitney
2025	Gen. J. Daniel Caine	(vacant)	Brig. Gen. Paige M. Jennings	Vice Adm. Thomas M. Henderschedt	Lt. Gen. David L. Odom	Vice Adm. Dion D. English	(vacant)	Lt. Gen. David T. Isaacson	Lt. Gen. Stephen E. Liszewski	Lt. Gen. Steven P. Whitney
2025	Gen. J. Daniel Caine	(vacant)	Brig. Gen. Paige M. Jennings	Vice Adm. Thomas M. Henderschedt	Lt. Gen. David L. Odom	Vice Adm. Dion D. English	Lt. Gen. Joseph P. McGee	Lt. Gen. David T. Isaacson	Lt. Gen. Stephen E. Liszewski	Vice Adm. Sara A. Joyner
2025	Gen. J. Daniel Caine	Lt. Gen. Douglas A. Sims II	Brig. Gen. Paige M. Jennings	Lt. Gen. Dimitri Henry	Lt. Gen. Alexus G. Grynkewich	Vice Adm. Dion D. English	Lt. Gen. Joseph P. McGee	Lt. Gen. David T. Isaacson	Lt. Gen. Dagvin R. M. Anderson	Vice Adm. Sara A. Joyner
2025	Gen. Charles Q. Brown Jr.	Lt. Gen. Douglas A. Sims II	Brig. Gen. Paige M. Jennings	Lt. Gen. Dimitri Henry	Lt. Gen. Alexus G. Grynkewich	Vice Adm. Dion D. English	Lt. Gen. Joseph P. McGee	Lt. Gen. David T. Isaacson	Lt. Gen. Dagvin R. M. Anderson	Vice Adm. Sara A. Joyner
2024	Gen. Charles Q. Brown Jr.	Lt. Gen. Douglas A. Sims II	Brig. Gen. Paige M. Jennings	Lt. Gen. Dimitri Henry	Lt. Gen. Alexus G. Grynkewich	Vice Adm. Dion D. English	Lt. Gen. Joseph P. McGee	Lt. Gen. David T. Isaacson	Lt. Gen. Dagvin R. M. Anderson	Vice Adm. Sara A. Joyner
2024	Gen. Charles Q. Brown Jr.	Lt. Gen. Douglas A. Sims II	(vacant)	Lt. Gen. Dimitri Henry	(vacant)	Lt. Gen. Leonard J. Kosinski	Lt. Gen. Joseph P. McGee	Lt. Gen. David T. Isaacson	Lt. Gen. Dagvin R. M. Anderson	Vice Adm. Sara A. Joyner
2024	Gen. Charles Q. Brown Jr.	Lt. Gen. Douglas A. Sims II	(vacant)	Lt. Gen. Dimitri Henry	(vacant)	Lt. Gen. Leonard J. Kosinski	Vice Adm. Stephen T. Koehler	Lt. Gen. David T. Isaacson	Lt. Gen. Dagvin R. M. Anderson	Vice Adm. Sara A. Joyner
2023	Gen. Charles Q. Brown Jr.	Lt. Gen. James J. Mingus	Maj. Gen. David T. Isaacson	Lt. Gen. Dimitri Henry	Lt. Gen. Douglas A. Sims II	Lt. Gen. Leonard J. Kosinski	Vice Adm. Stephen T. Koehler	(vacant)	Lt. Gen. Dagvin R. M. Anderson	Vice Adm. Sara A. Joyner
2023	Gen. Mark A. Milley	Lt. Gen. James J. Mingus	Maj. Gen. David T. Isaacson	Lt. Gen. Dimitri Henry	Lt. Gen. Douglas A. Sims II	Lt. Gen. Leonard J. Kosinski	Vice Adm. Stephen T. Koehler	Lt. Gen. Mary F. O'Brien	Lt. Gen. Dagvin R. M. Anderson	Vice Adm. Sara A. Joyner
2022	Gen. Mark A. Milley	Lt. Gen. James J. Mingus	Maj. Gen. David T. Isaacson	Lt. Gen. Dimitri Henry	Lt. Gen. Douglas A. Sims II	Lt. Gen. Leonard J. Kosinski	Vice Adm. Stephen T. Koehler	Lt. Gen. Mary F. O'Brien	Lt. Gen. Dagvin R. M. Anderson	Vice Adm. Sara A. Joyner
2022	Gen. Mark A. Milley	Lt. Gen. Andrew P. Poppas	Maj. Gen. Lenny J. Richoux	Vice Adm. Frank D. Whitworth III	Lt. Gen. James J. Mingus	Lt. Gen. Sam C. Barrett	Vice Adm. Lisa M. Franchetti	Lt. Gen. Dennis A. Crall	Vice Adm. Stuart B. Munsch	Vice Adm. Ronald A. Boxall
2021	Gen. Mark A. Milley	Lt. Gen. Andrew P. Poppas	Maj. Gen. Lenny J. Richoux	Vice Adm. Frank D. Whitworth III	Lt. Gen. James J. Mingus	Lt. Gen. Sam C. Barrett	Vice Adm. Lisa M. Franchetti	Lt. Gen. Dennis A. Crall	Vice Adm. Stuart B. Munsch	Vice Adm. Ronald A. Boxall
2021	Gen. Mark A. Milley	Lt. Gen. Andrew P. Poppas	Maj. Gen. Lenny J. Richoux	Rear Adm. Frank D. Whitworth III	Lt. Gen. James J. Mingus	Lt. Gen. Sam C. Barrett	Vice Adm. Lisa M. Franchetti	Lt. Gen. Dennis A. Crall	Vice Adm. Stuart B. Munsch	Vice Adm. Ronald A. Boxall
2020	Gen. Mark A. Milley	Lt. Gen. Andrew P. Poppas	Maj. Gen. Lenny J. Richoux	Rear Adm. Frank D. Whitworth III	Lt. Gen. James J. Mingus	Lt. Gen. Sam C. Barrett	Vice Adm. Lisa M. Franchetti	Lt. Gen. Dennis A. Crall	Vice Adm. Stuart B. Munsch	Vice Adm. Ronald A. Boxall
2020	Gen. Mark A. Milley	(vacant)	Maj. Gen. Lenny J. Richoux	Rear Adm. Frank D. Whitworth III	Lt. Gen. Andrew P. Poppas	Lt. Gen. Sam C. Barrett	Lt. Gen. David W. Allvin	Lt. Gen. Bradford J. Shwedo	Vice Adm. Stuart B. Munsch	Vice Adm. Ronald A. Boxall
2020	Gen. Mark A. Milley	Lt. Gen. Glen D. VanHerck	Maj. Gen. Lenny J. Richoux	Rear Adm. Frank D. Whitworth III	Lt. Gen. Andrew P. Poppas	Lt. Gen. Giovanni K. Tuck	Lt. Gen. David W. Allvin	Lt. Gen. Bradford J. Shwedo	Lt. Gen. Daniel J. O'Donohue	Vice Adm. Ronald A. Boxall
2019	Gen. Mark A. Milley	Lt. Gen. Glen D. VanHerck	Maj. Gen. Lenny J. Richoux	Rear Adm. Frank D. Whitworth III	Lt. Gen. Andrew P. Poppas	Lt. Gen. Giovanni K. Tuck	Lt. Gen. David W. Allvin	Lt. Gen. Bradford J. Shwedo	Lt. Gen. Daniel J. O'Donohue	Vice Adm. Ronald A. Boxall
2019	Gen. Joseph F. Dunford Jr.	(vacant)	Maj. Gen. Lenny J. Richoux	Rear Adm. Frank D. Whitworth III	Lt. Gen. Andrew P. Poppas	Lt. Gen. Giovanni K. Tuck	Lt. Gen. David W. Allvin	Lt. Gen. Bradford J. Shwedo	Lt. Gen. Daniel J. O'Donohue	Vice Adm. Ronald A. Boxall
2019	Gen. Joseph F. Dunford Jr.	Vice Adm. Michael M. Gilday	Rear Adm. Sara A. Joyner	Rear Adm. Frank D. Whitworth III	Lt. Gen. Andrew P. Poppas	Lt. Gen. Giovanni K. Tuck	Lt. Gen. David W. Allvin	Lt. Gen. Bradford J. Shwedo	Lt. Gen. Daniel J. O'Donohue	Lt. Gen. Anthony R. Ierardi
2019	Gen. Joseph F. Dunford Jr.	Lt. Gen. Kenneth F. McKenzie Jr.	Rear Adm. Sara A. Joyner	Maj. Gen. Michael S. Groen	Vice Adm. Michael M. Gilday	Lt. Gen. Giovanni K. Tuck	Lt. Gen. Richard D. Clarke Jr.	Lt. Gen. Bradford J. Shwedo	Lt. Gen. Daniel J. O'Donohue	Lt. Gen. Anthony R. Ierardi
2018	Gen. Joseph F. Dunford Jr.	Lt. Gen. Kenneth F. McKenzie Jr.	Rear Adm. Sara A. Joyner	Maj. Gen. Michael S. Groen	Vice Adm. Michael M. Gilday	Lt. Gen. Giovanni K. Tuck	Lt. Gen. Richard D. Clarke Jr.	Lt. Gen. Bradford J. Shwedo	Lt. Gen. Daniel J. O'Donohue	Lt. Gen. Anthony R. Ierardi
2018	Gen. Joseph F. Dunford Jr.	Lt. Gen. Kenneth F. McKenzie Jr.	Brig. Gen. Kyle J. Kremer	Maj. Gen. Michael S. Groen	Lt. Gen. John L. Dolan	Lt. Gen. Stephen R. Lyons	Lt. Gen. Richard D. Clarke Jr.	Vice Adm. Marshall B. Lytle III	Vice Adm. Kevin D. Scott	Lt. Gen. Anthony R. Ierardi
2017	Gen. Joseph F. Dunford Jr.	Lt. Gen. Kenneth F. McKenzie Jr.	Brig. Gen. Kyle J. Kremer	Maj. Gen. Michael S. Groen	Lt. Gen. John L. Dolan	Lt. Gen. Stephen R. Lyons	Lt. Gen. Richard D. Clarke Jr.	Vice Adm. Marshall B. Lytle III	Vice Adm. Kevin D. Scott	Lt. Gen. Anthony R. Ierardi
2017	Gen. Joseph F. Dunford Jr.	Lt. Gen. Kenneth F. McKenzie Jr.	Brig. Gen. Kyle J. Kremer	Maj. Gen. Michael S. Groen	Lt. Gen. John L. Dolan	Vice Adm. William A. Brown	Lt. Gen. Richard D. Clarke Jr.	Vice Adm. Marshall B. Lytle III	Vice Adm. Kevin D. Scott	Lt. Gen. Anthony R. Ierardi
2017	Gen. Joseph F. Dunford Jr.	Lt. Gen. William C. Mayville Jr.	Brig. Gen. Kyle J. Kremer	Maj. Gen. James R. Marrs	Lt. Gen. John L. Dolan	Vice Adm. William A. Brown	Lt. Gen. Kenneth F. McKenzie Jr.	Vice Adm. Marshall B. Lytle III	Vice Adm. Kevin D. Scott	Lt. Gen. Anthony R. Ierardi
2016	Gen. Joseph F. Dunford Jr.	Lt. Gen. William C. Mayville Jr.	Brig. Gen. Kyle J. Kremer	Maj. Gen. James R. Marrs	Lt. Gen. John L. Dolan	Vice Adm. William A. Brown	Lt. Gen. Kenneth F. McKenzie Jr.	Vice Adm. Marshall B. Lytle III	Vice Adm. Kevin D. Scott	Lt. Gen. Anthony R. Ierardi
2016	Gen. Joseph F. Dunford Jr.	Lt. Gen. William C. Mayville Jr.	Brig. Gen. Margaret W. Burcham	Maj. Gen. James R. Marrs	Lt. Gen. Tod D. Wolters	Vice Adm. William A. Brown	Lt. Gen. Kenneth F. McKenzie Jr.	Lt. Gen. Mark S. Bowman	Lt. Gen. Thomas D. Waldhauser	Lt. Gen. Anthony R. Ierardi
2015	Gen. Joseph F. Dunford Jr.	Lt. Gen. William C. Mayville Jr.	Brig. Gen. Margaret W. Burcham	Maj. Gen. James R. Marrs	Lt. Gen. Tod D. Wolters	Vice Adm. William A. Brown	Vice Adm. Frank C. Pandolfe	Lt. Gen. Mark S. Bowman	Lt. Gen. Thomas D. Waldhauser	Lt. Gen. Anthony R. Ierardi
2015	Gen. Martin E. Dempsey	Lt. Gen. William C. Mayville Jr.	Brig. Gen. Margaret W. Burcham	Maj. Gen. James R. Marrs	Lt. Gen. Tod D. Wolters	Lt. Gen. Robert R. Ruark	Vice Adm. Frank C. Pandolfe	Lt. Gen. Mark S. Bowman	Lt. Gen. Thomas D. Waldhauser	Lt. Gen. Mark F. Ramsay
2015	Gen. Martin E. Dempsey	Lt. Gen. David L. Goldfein	Brig. Gen. Margaret W. Burcham	Rear Adm. Paul B. Becker	Lt. Gen. William C. Mayville Jr.	Lt. Gen. Robert R. Ruark	Vice Adm. Frank C. Pandolfe	Lt. Gen. Mark S. Bowman	Lt. Gen. Thomas D. Waldhauser	Lt. Gen. Mark F. Ramsay
2014	Gen. Martin E. Dempsey	Lt. Gen. David L. Goldfein	Brig. Gen. Margaret W. Burcham	Rear Adm. Paul B. Becker	Lt. Gen. William C. Mayville Jr.	Lt. Gen. Robert R. Ruark	Vice Adm. Frank C. Pandolfe	Lt. Gen. Mark S. Bowman	Lt. Gen. Thomas D. Waldhauser	Lt. Gen. Mark F. Ramsay
2014	Gen. Martin E. Dempsey	Lt. Gen. David L. Goldfein	Rear Adm. Dwight D. Shepherd	Rear Adm. Paul B. Becker	Lt. Gen. William C. Mayville Jr.	Lt. Gen. Robert R. Ruark	Vice Adm. Frank C. Pandolfe	Lt. Gen. Mark S. Bowman	Lt. Gen. Thomas D. Waldhauser	Lt. Gen. Mark F. Ramsay
2013	Gen. Martin E. Dempsey	Lt. Gen. David L. Goldfein	Rear Adm. Dwight D. Shepherd	Rear Adm. Paul B. Becker	Lt. Gen. William C. Mayville Jr.	Lt. Gen. Robert R. Ruark	Lt. Gen. Terry A. Wolff	Lt. Gen. Mark S. Bowman	Lt. Gen. Thomas D. Waldhauser	Lt. Gen. Mark F. Ramsay
2013	Gen. Martin E. Dempsey	Lt. Gen. David L. Goldfein	Rear Adm. Dwight D. Shepherd	Rear Adm. Elizabeth L. Train	Vice Adm. Kurt W. Tidd	Lt. Gen. Brooks L. Bash	Lt. Gen. Terry A. Wolff	Lt. Gen. Mark S. Bowman	(vacant)	Lt. Gen. Mark F. Ramsay
2013	Gen. Martin E. Dempsey	Lt. Gen. Curtis M. Scaparrotti	Rear Adm. Dwight D. Shepherd	Rear Adm. Elizabeth L. Train	Vice Adm. Kurt W. Tidd	Lt. Gen. Brooks L. Bash	Lt. Gen. Terry A. Wolff	Lt. Gen. Mark S. Bowman	Lt. Gen. George J. Flynn	Lt. Gen. Mark F. Ramsay
2012	Gen. Martin E. Dempsey	Lt. Gen. Curtis M. Scaparrotti	Rear Adm. Dwight D. Shepherd	Rear Adm. Elizabeth L. Train	Vice Adm. Kurt W. Tidd	Lt. Gen. Brooks L. Bash	Lt. Gen. Terry A. Wolff	Lt. Gen. Mark S. Bowman	Lt. Gen. George J. Flynn	Lt. Gen. Mark F. Ramsay
2012	Gen. Martin E. Dempsey	Lt. Gen. Curtis M. Scaparrotti	Rear Adm. Dwight D. Shepherd	Rear Adm. Elizabeth L. Train	Vice Adm. Kurt W. Tidd	Lt. Gen. Brooks L. Bash	Lt. Gen. Terry A. Wolff	Maj. Gen. Mark S. Bowman	Lt. Gen. George J. Flynn	Lt. Gen. Mark F. Ramsay
2012	Gen. Martin E. Dempsey	Vice Adm. William E. Gortney	Brig. Gen. Colleen L. McGuire	Rear Adm. Elizabeth L. Train	Lt. Gen. Robert B. Neller	Lt. Gen. Brooks L. Bash	Lt. Gen. Terry A. Wolff	Maj. Gen. Mark S. Bowman	Lt. Gen. George J. Flynn	Lt. Gen. Larry O. Spencer
2011	Gen. Martin E. Dempsey	Vice Adm. William E. Gortney	Brig. Gen. Colleen L. McGuire	Rear Adm. Elizabeth L. Train	Lt. Gen. Robert B. Neller	Lt. Gen. Brooks L. Bash	Lt. Gen. Terry A. Wolff	Director, J6	Lt. Gen. George J. Flynn	Lt. Gen. Larry O. Spencer
2011	Adm. Michael G. Mullen	Vice Adm. William E. Gortney	(vacant)	Rear Adm. Michael S. Rogers	Lt. Gen. Robert B. Neller	Lt. Gen. Kathleen M. Gainey	Lt. Gen. Charles H. Jacoby Jr.	Lt. Gen. Larry O. Spencer	Lt. Gen. George J. Flynn	Lt. Gen. Larry O. Spencer
2011	Adm. Michael G. Mullen	Vice Adm. William E. Gortney	Brig. Gen. Walter M. Golden Jr.	Rear Adm. Michael S. Rogers	Lt. Gen. Robert B. Neller	Lt. Gen. Kathleen M. Gainey	Lt. Gen. Charles H. Jacoby Jr.	Lt. Gen. Larry O. Spencer	Brig. Gen. Ralph O. Baker Jr.	Lt. Gen. Larry O. Spencer
2011	Adm. Michael G. Mullen	Vice Adm. William E. Gortney	Brig. Gen. Walter M. Golden Jr.	Rear Adm. Michael S. Rogers	Lt. Gen. Robert B. Neller	Lt. Gen. Kathleen M. Gainey	Lt. Gen. Charles H. Jacoby Jr.	Lt. Gen. Dennis L. Via	Brig. Gen. Ralph O. Baker Jr.	Lt. Gen. Larry O. Spencer
2010	Adm. Michael G. Mullen	Vice Adm. William E. Gortney	Brig. Gen. Walter M. Golden Jr.	Rear Adm. Michael S. Rogers	Lt. Gen. John M. Paxton Jr.	Lt. Gen. Kathleen M. Gainey	Lt. Gen. Charles H. Jacoby Jr.	Lt. Gen. Dennis L. Via	Brig. Gen. Ralph O. Baker Jr.	Lt. Gen. Larry O. Spencer
2010	Adm. Michael G. Mullen	Lt. Gen. Lloyd J. Austin III	Brig. Gen. Walter M. Golden Jr.	Rear Adm. Michael S. Rogers	Lt. Gen. John M. Paxton Jr.	Lt. Gen. Kathleen M. Gainey	Vice Adm. James A. Winnefeld Jr.	Lt. Gen. Dennis L. Via	Brig. Gen. William C. Hix	Lt. Gen. Larry O. Spencer
2010	Adm. Michael G. Mullen	Lt. Gen. Lloyd J. Austin III	Brig. Gen. Walter M. Golden Jr.	Rear Adm. Michael S. Rogers	Lt. Gen. John M. Paxton Jr.	Lt. Gen. Kathleen M. Gainey	Vice Adm. James A. Winnefeld Jr.	Lt. Gen. Dennis L. Via	Brig. Gen. William C. Hix	Vice Adm. P. Stephen Stanley
2009	Adm. Michael G. Mullen	Lt. Gen. Lloyd J. Austin III	Brig. Gen. Walter M. Golden Jr.	Rear Adm. Michael S. Rogers	Lt. Gen. John M. Paxton Jr.	Lt. Gen. Kathleen M. Gainey	Vice Adm. James A. Winnefeld Jr.	Lt. Gen. Dennis L. Via	Brig. Gen. William C. Hix	Vice Adm. P. Stephen Stanley
2009	Adm. Michael G. Mullen	Lt. Gen. Lloyd J. Austin III	Brig. Gen. Gary S. Patton	(vacant)	Lt. Gen. John M. Paxton Jr.	Lt. Gen. Kathleen M. Gainey	Vice Adm. James A. Winnefeld Jr.	Lt. Gen. Dennis L. Via	Col. William C. Hix	Vice Adm. P. Stephen Stanley
2009	Adm. Michael G. Mullen	Lt. Gen. Stanley A. McChrystal	Brig. Gen. Gary S. Patton	Maj. Gen. Michael T. Flynn	Lt. Gen. John M. Paxton Jr.	Lt. Gen. Kathleen M. Gainey	Vice Adm. James A. Winnefeld Jr.	Vice Adm. Nancy E. Brown	Brig. Gen. Michael E. Rounds	Vice Adm. P. Stephen Stanley
2008	Adm. Michael G. Mullen	Lt. Gen. Stanley A. McChrystal	Brig. Gen. Gary S. Patton	Maj. Gen. Michael T. Flynn	Lt. Gen. John M. Paxton Jr.	Lt. Gen. Kathleen M. Gainey	Vice Adm. James A. Winnefeld Jr.	Vice Adm. Nancy E. Brown	Brig. Gen. Michael E. Rounds	Vice Adm. P. Stephen Stanley
2008	Adm. Michael G. Mullen	Lt. Gen. Stanley A. McChrystal	Brig. Gen. Gary S. Patton	Maj. Gen. Michael T. Flynn	Lt. Gen. Carter F. Ham	Lt. Gen. Kathleen M. Gainey	Vice Adm. James A. Winnefeld Jr.	Vice Adm. Nancy E. Brown	Brig. Gen. Michael E. Rounds	Vice Adm. P. Stephen Stanley
2008	Adm. Michael G. Mullen	Lt. Gen. Walter L. Sharp	Brig. Gen. Gary S. Patton	Rear Adm. David J. Dorsett	Lt. Gen. Carter F. Ham	Lt. Gen. Kathleen M. Gainey	Lt. Gen. John F. Sattler	Vice Adm. Nancy E. Brown	Rear Adm. Richard J. Mauldin	Vice Adm. P. Stephen Stanley
2008	Adm. Michael G. Mullen	Lt. Gen. Walter L. Sharp	Brig. Gen. Gary S. Patton	Rear Adm. David J. Dorsett	Lt. Gen. Carter F. Ham	Lt. Gen. Claude V. Christianson	Lt. Gen. John F. Sattler	Vice Adm. Nancy E. Brown	Rear Adm. Richard J. Mauldin	Vice Adm. P. Stephen Stanley
2007	Adm. Michael G. Mullen	Lt. Gen. Walter L. Sharp	Rear Adm. Donna L. Crisp	Rear Adm. David J. Dorsett	Lt. Gen. Carter F. Ham	Lt. Gen. Claude V. Christianson	Lt. Gen. John F. Sattler	Vice Adm. Nancy E. Brown	Rear Adm. Richard J. Mauldin	Vice Adm. P. Stephen Stanley
2007	Gen. Peter Pace	Lt. Gen. Walter L. Sharp	Rear Adm. Donna L. Crisp	Rear Adm. David J. Dorsett	(vacant)	Lt. Gen. Claude V. Christianson	Lt. Gen. John F. Sattler	Vice Adm. Nancy E. Brown	Rear Adm. Richard J. Mauldin	Vice Adm. P. Stephen Stanley
2007	Gen. Peter Pace	Lt. Gen. Walter L. Sharp	Rear Adm. Donna L. Crisp	Rear Adm. David J. Dorsett	Lt. Gen. Douglas E. Lute	Lt. Gen. Claude V. Christianson	Lt. Gen. John F. Sattler	Vice Adm. Nancy E. Brown	Rear Adm. Richard J. Mauldin	Vice Adm. P. Stephen Stanley
2006	Gen. Peter Pace	Lt. Gen. Walter L. Sharp	Rear Adm. Donna L. Crisp	Rear Adm. David J. Dorsett	Lt. Gen. Douglas E. Lute	Lt. Gen. Claude V. Christianson	Lt. Gen. John F. Sattler	Vice Adm. Nancy E. Brown	Rear Adm. Richard J. Mauldin	Vice Adm. P. Stephen Stanley
2006	Gen. Peter Pace	Lt. Gen. Walter L. Sharp	Rear Adm. Donna L. Crisp	Rear Adm. David J. Dorsett	Lt. Gen. James T. Conway	Lt. Gen. Claude V. Christianson	Lt. Gen. Victor E. Renuart Jr.	Vice Adm. Nancy E. Brown	Rear Adm. Richard J. Mauldin	Vice Adm. Evan M. Chanik Jr.
2006	Gen. Peter Pace	Lt. Gen. Walter L. Sharp	Rear Adm. Donna L. Crisp	Rear Adm. David J. Dorsett	Lt. Gen. James T. Conway	Lt. Gen. Claude V. Christianson	Lt. Gen. Victor E. Renuart Jr.	Lt. Gen. Robert M. Shea	Rear Adm. Richard J. Mauldin	Vice Adm. Evan M. Chanik Jr.
2005	Gen. Peter Pace	Lt. Gen. Walter L. Sharp	Rear Adm. Donna L. Crisp	Rear Adm. David J. Dorsett	Lt. Gen. James T. Conway	Lt. Gen. Claude V. Christianson	Lt. Gen. Victor E. Renuart Jr.	Lt. Gen. Robert M. Shea	Rear Adm. Richard J. Mauldin	Vice Adm. Evan M. Chanik Jr.
2005	Gen. Richard B. Myers	Lt. Gen. Norton A. Schwartz	Rear Adm. Donna L. Crisp	Rear Adm. David J. Dorsett	Lt. Gen. James T. Conway	Lt. Gen. Duncan J. McNabb	Lt. Gen. Walter L. Sharp	Lt. Gen. Robert M. Shea	Rear Adm. Richard J. Mauldin	Vice Adm. Evan M. Chanik Jr.
2005	Gen. Richard B. Myers	Lt. Gen. Norton A. Schwartz	Rear Adm. Donna L. Crisp	Maj. Gen. Ronald L. Burgess Jr.	Lt. Gen. James T. Conway	Lt. Gen. Duncan J. McNabb	Lt. Gen. Walter L. Sharp	Lt. Gen. Robert M. Shea	Maj. Gen. Jack J. Catton Jr.	Vice Adm. Evan M. Chanik Jr.
2005	Gen. Richard B. Myers	Lt. Gen. Norton A. Schwartz	Rear Adm. Donna L. Crisp	Maj. Gen. Ronald L. Burgess Jr.	Lt. Gen. James T. Conway	Lt. Gen. Duncan J. McNabb	Lt. Gen. Walter L. Sharp	Lt. Gen. Robert M. Shea	Maj. Gen. Jack J. Catton Jr.	Vice Adm. Robert F. Willard
2004	Gen. Richard B. Myers	Lt. Gen. Norton A. Schwartz	Rear Adm. Donna L. Crisp	Maj. Gen. Ronald L. Burgess Jr.	Lt. Gen. James T. Conway	Lt. Gen. Duncan J. McNabb	Lt. Gen. Walter L. Sharp	Lt. Gen. Robert M. Shea	Maj. Gen. Jack J. Catton Jr.	Vice Adm. Robert F. Willard
2004	Gen. Richard B. Myers	Vice Adm. Timothy J. Keating	Brig. Gen. Maria C. Owens	Maj. Gen. Ronald L. Burgess Jr.	Lt. Gen. Norton A. Schwartz	Vice Adm. Gordon S. Holder	Lt. Gen. Walter L. Sharp	Lt. Gen. Robert M. Shea	Maj. Gen. Jack J. Catton Jr.	Vice Adm. Robert F. Willard
2004	Gen. Richard B. Myers	Vice Adm. Timothy J. Keating	Brig. Gen. Maria C. Owens	Maj. Gen. Ronald L. Burgess Jr.	Lt. Gen. Norton A. Schwartz	Vice Adm. Gordon S. Holder	Lt. Gen. Walter L. Sharp	Lt. Gen. Robert M. Shea	Maj. Gen. Jack J. Catton Jr.	Lt. Gen. James E. Cartwright
2003	Gen. Richard B. Myers	Vice Adm. Timothy J. Keating	Brig. Gen. Maria C. Owens	Maj. Gen. Ronald L. Burgess Jr.	Lt. Gen. Norton A. Schwartz	Vice Adm. Gordon S. Holder	Lt. Gen. Walter L. Sharp	Lt. Gen. Robert M. Shea	Maj. Gen. Jack J. Catton Jr.	Lt. Gen. James E. Cartwright
2003	Gen. Richard B. Myers	Lt. Gen. George W. Casey Jr.	Brig. Gen. Maria C. Owens	Maj. Gen. Ronald L. Burgess Jr.	Lt. Gen. Norton A. Schwartz	Vice Adm. Gordon S. Holder	Lt. Gen. Walter L. Sharp	Lt. Gen. Robert M. Shea	Maj. Gen. Jack J. Catton Jr.	Lt. Gen. James E. Cartwright
2003	Gen. Richard B. Myers	Lt. Gen. George W. Casey Jr.	Brig. Gen. Maria C. Owens	Maj. Gen. Glen D. Shaffer	Lt. Gen. Norton A. Schwartz	Vice Adm. Gordon S. Holder	Lt. Gen. Walter L. Sharp	Lt. Gen. Joseph K. Kellogg Jr.	Brig. Gen. Mark P. Hertling	Lt. Gen. James E. Cartwright
2003	Gen. Richard B. Myers	Lt. Gen. George W. Casey Jr.	Brig. Gen. Maria C. Owens	Maj. Gen. Glen D. Shaffer	Lt. Gen. Norton A. Schwartz	Vice Adm. Gordon S. Holder	(vacant)	Lt. Gen. Joseph K. Kellogg Jr.	Brig. Gen. Mark P. Hertling	Lt. Gen. James E. Cartwright
2002	Gen. Richard B. Myers	Lt. Gen. John P. Abizaid	Brig. Gen. Maria C. Owens	Maj. Gen. Glen D. Shaffer	Lt. Gen. Norton A. Schwartz	Vice Adm. Gordon S. Holder	Lt. Gen. George W. Casey Jr.	Lt. Gen. Joseph K. Kellogg Jr.	Col. Mark P. Hertling	Lt. Gen. James E. Cartwright
2002	Gen. Richard B. Myers	Lt. Gen. John P. Abizaid	Brig. Gen. Maria C. Owens	Maj. Gen. Glen D. Shaffer	Lt. Gen. Gregory S. Newbold	Vice Adm. Gordon S. Holder	Lt. Gen. George W. Casey Jr.	Lt. Gen. Joseph K. Kellogg Jr.	Maj. Gen. Henry P. Osman	Lt. Gen. James E. Cartwright
2002	Gen. Richard B. Myers	Lt. Gen. John P. Abizaid	Brig. Gen. Maria C. Owens	Rear Adm. Lowell E. Jacoby	Lt. Gen. Gregory S. Newbold	Vice Adm. Gordon S. Holder	Lt. Gen. George W. Casey Jr.	Lt. Gen. Joseph K. Kellogg Jr.	Maj. Gen. Henry P. Osman	Lt. Gen. Bruce A. Carlson
2002	Gen. Richard B. Myers	Lt. Gen. John P. Abizaid	Brig. Gen. Robert L. Smolen	Rear Adm. Lowell E. Jacoby	Lt. Gen. Gregory S. Newbold	Vice Adm. Gordon S. Holder	Lt. Gen. George W. Casey Jr.	Lt. Gen. Joseph K. Kellogg Jr.	Maj. Gen. Henry P. Osman	Lt. Gen. Bruce A. Carlson
2001	Gen. Richard B. Myers	Lt. Gen. John P. Abizaid	Brig. Gen. Robert L. Smolen	Rear Adm. Lowell E. Jacoby	Lt. Gen. Gregory S. Newbold	Vice Adm. Gordon S. Holder	Lt. Gen. George W. Casey Jr.	Lt. Gen. Joseph K. Kellogg Jr.	Maj. Gen. Henry P. Osman	Lt. Gen. Bruce A. Carlson
2001	Gen. Henry H. Shelton	Vice Adm. Scott A. Fry	Brig. Gen. Robert L. Smolen	Rear Adm. Lowell E. Jacoby	Lt. Gen. Gregory S. Newbold	Lt. Gen. John M. McDuffie	Lt. Gen. John P. Abizaid	Lt. Gen. Joseph K. Kellogg Jr.	Maj. Gen. Henry P. Osman	Lt. Gen. Bruce A. Carlson
2000	Gen. Henry H. Shelton	Vice Adm. Scott A. Fry	Brig. Gen. Robert L. Smolen	Rear Adm. Lowell E. Jacoby	Lt. Gen. Gregory S. Newbold	Lt. Gen. John M. McDuffie	Lt. Gen. John P. Abizaid	Lt. Gen. Joseph K. Kellogg Jr.	Maj. Gen. Henry P. Osman	Lt. Gen. Bruce A. Carlson
2000	Gen. Henry H. Shelton	Vice Adm. Scott A. Fry	Brig. Gen. Robert L. Smolen	Rear Adm. Lowell E. Jacoby	(vacant)	Lt. Gen. John M. McDuffie	Lt. Gen. Edward G. Anderson III	Lt. Gen. John L. Woodward Jr.	Maj. Gen. Henry P. Osman	Lt. Gen. Bruce A. Carlson
2000	Gen. Henry H. Shelton	Lt. Gen. Carlton W. Fulford Jr.	Brig. Gen. Robert L. Smolen	Rear Adm. Lowell E. Jacoby	Vice Adm. Scott A. Fry	Lt. Gen. John M. McDuffie	Lt. Gen. Edward G. Anderson III	Lt. Gen. John L. Woodward Jr.	Maj. Gen. Henry P. Osman	Lt. Gen. Bruce A. Carlson
2000	Gen. Henry H. Shelton	Lt. Gen. Carlton W. Fulford Jr.	Brig. Gen. Robert L. Smolen	Rear Adm. Lowell E. Jacoby	Vice Adm. Scott A. Fry	Lt. Gen. John M. McDuffie	Lt. Gen. Edward G. Anderson III	Lt. Gen. John L. Woodward Jr.	Maj. Gen. George F. Close Jr.	Lt. Gen. Bruce A. Carlson
1999	Gen. Henry H. Shelton	Lt. Gen. Carlton W. Fulford Jr.	Brig. Gen. Patrick O. Adams	Rear Adm. Lowell E. Jacoby	Vice Adm. Scott A. Fry	Lt. Gen. John M. McDuffie	Lt. Gen. Edward G. Anderson III	Lt. Gen. John L. Woodward Jr.	Maj. Gen. George F. Close Jr.	Lt. Gen. Frank B. Campbell
1999	Gen. Henry H. Shelton	Vice Adm. Vernon E. Clark	Brig. Gen. Patrick O. Adams	Rear Adm. Thomas R. Wilson	Vice Adm. Scott A. Fry	Lt. Gen. John M. McDuffie	Lt. Gen. Edward G. Anderson III	Lt. Gen. John L. Woodward Jr.	Maj. Gen. George F. Close Jr.	Lt. Gen. Frank B. Campbell
1998	Gen. Henry H. Shelton	Vice Adm. Dennis C. Blair	Brig. Gen. Patrick O. Adams	Rear Adm. Thomas R. Wilson	Vice Adm. Vernon E. Clark	Lt. Gen. John M. McDuffie	Lt. Gen. Edward G. Anderson III	Lt. Gen. John L. Woodward Jr.	Maj. Gen. George F. Close Jr.	Lt. Gen. Frank B. Campbell
1998	Gen. Henry H. Shelton	Vice Adm. Dennis C. Blair	Brig. Gen. Patrick O. Adams	Rear Adm. Thomas R. Wilson	Vice Adm. Vernon E. Clark	Lt. Gen. John M. McDuffie	Lt. Gen. Edward G. Anderson III	Lt. Gen. Douglas D. Buchholz	Maj. Gen. George F. Close Jr.	Lt. Gen. Frank B. Campbell
1998	Gen. Henry H. Shelton	Vice Adm. Dennis C. Blair	Brig. Gen. Patrick O. Adams	Rear Adm. Thomas R. Wilson	Vice Adm. Vernon E. Clark	Lt. Gen. John J. Cusick	Vice Adm. John S. Redd	Lt. Gen. Douglas D. Buchholz	Maj. Gen. George F. Close Jr.	Lt. Gen. Frank B. Campbell
1998	Gen. Henry H. Shelton	Vice Adm. Dennis C. Blair	Brig. Gen. Patrick O. Adams	Maj. Gen. James C. King	Vice Adm. Vernon E. Clark	Lt. Gen. John J. Cusick	Vice Adm. John S. Redd	Lt. Gen. Douglas D. Buchholz	Maj. Gen. George F. Close Jr.	Lt. Gen. Frank B. Campbell
1997	Gen. Henry H. Shelton	Vice Adm. Dennis C. Blair	Brig. Gen. Patrick O. Adams	Maj. Gen. James C. King	Lt. Gen. Peter Pace	Lt. Gen. John J. Cusick	Vice Adm. John S. Redd	Lt. Gen. Douglas D. Buchholz	Maj. Gen. George F. Close Jr.	Lt. Gen. David J. McCloud
1997	Gen. John M. D. Shalikashvili	Vice Adm. Dennis C. Blair	Brig. Gen. Patrick O. Adams	Maj. Gen. James C. King	Lt. Gen. Peter Pace	Lt. Gen. John J. Cusick	Vice Adm. John S. Redd	Lt. Gen. Douglas D. Buchholz	Maj. Gen. George F. Close Jr.	Lt. Gen. David J. McCloud
1997	Gen. John M. D. Shalikashvili	Vice Adm. Dennis C. Blair	Brig. Gen. Patrick O. Adams	Maj. Gen. James C. King	Lt. Gen. Peter Pace	Lt. Gen. John J. Cusick	Vice Adm. John S. Redd	Lt. Gen. Douglas D. Buchholz	Maj. Gen. David A. Sawyer	Lt. Gen. David J. McCloud
1996	Gen. John M. D. Shalikashvili	Vice Adm. Dennis C. Blair	Rear Adm. Veronica Z. Froman	Maj. Gen. James C. King	Lt. Gen. Peter Pace	Lt. Gen. John J. Cusick	Vice Adm. John S. Redd	Lt. Gen. Douglas D. Buchholz	Maj. Gen. David A. Sawyer	Lt. Gen. David J. McCloud
1996	Gen. John M. D. Shalikashvili	(vacant)	Rear Adm. Veronica Z. Froman	Maj. Gen. James C. King	Lt. Gen. Howell M. Estes III	Lt. Gen. John J. Cusick	Vice Adm. John S. Redd	Vice Adm. Arthur K. Cebrowski	Maj. Gen. David A. Sawyer	Maj. Gen. David J. McCloud
1996	Gen. John M. D. Shalikashvili	Lt. Gen. Walter Kross	Rear Adm. Veronica Z. Froman	Maj. Gen. James C. King	Lt. Gen. Howell M. Estes III	Vice Adm. John B. LaPlante	Lt. Gen. Wesley K. Clark	Vice Adm. Arthur K. Cebrowski	Maj. Gen. Stephen Silvasy Jr.	Rear Adm. Francis W. Lacroix
1996	Gen. John M. D. Shalikashvili	Lt. Gen. Walter Kross	Rear Adm. Veronica Z. Froman	Maj. Gen. Patrick M. Hughes	Lt. Gen. Howell M. Estes III	Vice Adm. John B. LaPlante	Lt. Gen. Wesley K. Clark	Vice Adm. Arthur K. Cebrowski	Maj. Gen. Stephen Silvasy Jr.	Rear Adm. Francis W. Lacroix
1995	Gen. John M. D. Shalikashvili	Lt. Gen. Walter Kross	Rear Adm. Veronica Z. Froman	Maj. Gen. Patrick M. Hughes	Lt. Gen. Howell M. Estes III	Vice Adm. John B. LaPlante	Lt. Gen. Wesley K. Clark	Vice Adm. Arthur K. Cebrowski	Maj. Gen. Stephen Silvasy Jr.	Rear Adm. Francis W. Lacroix
1995	Gen. John M. D. Shalikashvili	Lt. Gen. Walter Kross	Rear Adm. Patricia A. Tracey	Maj. Gen. Patrick M. Hughes	Lt. Gen. Howell M. Estes III	Vice Adm. John B. LaPlante	Lt. Gen. Wesley K. Clark	Vice Adm. Arthur K. Cebrowski	Maj. Gen. Stephen Silvasy Jr.	Maj. Gen. Ralph E. Eberhart
1994	Gen. John M. D. Shalikashvili	Lt. Gen. Walter Kross	Rear Adm. Patricia A. Tracey	Maj. Gen. Patrick M. Hughes	Lt. Gen. Howell M. Estes III	Vice Adm. John B. LaPlante	Lt. Gen. Wesley K. Clark	Vice Adm. Arthur K. Cebrowski	Maj. Gen. Stephen Silvasy Jr.	Maj. Gen. Ralph E. Eberhart
1994	Gen. John M. D. Shalikashvili	Lt. Gen. Walter Kross	Rear Adm. Patricia A. Tracey	Maj. Gen. Patrick M. Hughes	Lt. Gen. John J. Sheehan	Vice Adm. John B. LaPlante	Lt. Gen. Wesley K. Clark	(vacant)	Maj. Gen. Stephen Silvasy Jr.	Maj. Gen. Ralph E. Eberhart
1994	Gen. John M. D. Shalikashvili	Vice Adm. Richard C. Macke	Rear Adm. Patricia A. Tracey	Rear Adm. Michael W. Cramer	Lt. Gen. John J. Sheehan	Vice Adm. John B. LaPlante	Lt. Gen. Wesley K. Clark	Lt. Gen. Albert J. Edmonds	Maj. Gen. Stephen Silvasy Jr.	Maj. Gen. Ralph E. Eberhart
1994	Gen. John M. D. Shalikashvili	Vice Adm. Richard C. Macke	Rear Adm. Patricia A. Tracey	Rear Adm. Michael W. Cramer	Lt. Gen. John J. Sheehan	Lt. Gen. Gary H. Mears	Lt. Gen. Barry R. McCaffrey	Lt. Gen. Albert J. Edmonds	Maj. Gen. Stephen Silvasy Jr.	Rear Adm. Conrad C. Lautenbacher Jr.
1993	Gen. John M. D. Shalikashvili	Vice Adm. Richard C. Macke	Rear Adm. Patricia A. Tracey	Rear Adm. Michael W. Cramer	Lt. Gen. John J. Sheehan	Lt. Gen. Gary H. Mears	Lt. Gen. Barry R. McCaffrey	Lt. Gen. Albert J. Edmonds	Maj. Gen. Stephen Silvasy Jr.	Rear Adm. Conrad C. Lautenbacher Jr.
1993	Gen. Colin L. Powell	Vice Adm. Richard C. Macke	Rear Adm. Patricia A. Tracey	Rear Adm. Michael W. Cramer	Lt. Gen. John J. Sheehan	Lt. Gen. Gary H. Mears	Lt. Gen. Barry R. McCaffrey	Lt. Gen. Albert J. Edmonds	Maj. Gen. Alan V. Rogers	Rear Adm. Conrad C. Lautenbacher Jr.
1993	Gen. Colin L. Powell	Vice Adm. Richard C. Macke	Brig. Gen. Mary C. Willis	Rear Adm. Michael W. Cramer	Lt. Gen. Martin L. Brandtner	Lt. Gen. Gary H. Mears	Lt. Gen. Barry R. McCaffrey	Lt. Gen. Albert J. Edmonds	Maj. Gen. Alan V. Rogers	Rear Adm. Conrad C. Lautenbacher Jr.
1993	Gen. Colin L. Powell	Vice Adm. Richard C. Macke	Brig. Gen. Mary C. Willis	Rear Adm. Michael W. Cramer	Lt. Gen. Martin L. Brandtner	Lt. Gen. Gary H. Mears	Lt. Gen. Edwin S. Leland Jr.	Maj. Gen. Albert J. Edmonds	Maj. Gen. Alan V. Rogers	Rear Adm. Conrad C. Lautenbacher Jr.
1992	Gen. Colin L. Powell	Lt. Gen. Henry Viccellio Jr.	Brig. Gen. Mary C. Willis	Rear Adm. Michael W. Cramer	Lt. Gen. Martin L. Brandtner	Lt. Gen. Gary H. Mears	Lt. Gen. Edwin S. Leland Jr.	Vice Adm. Richard C. Macke	Maj. Gen. Alan V. Rogers	Rear Adm. Conrad C. Lautenbacher Jr.
1992	Gen. Colin L. Powell	Lt. Gen. Henry Viccellio Jr.	Brig. Gen. Mary C. Willis	Rear Adm. John M. McConnell	Lt. Gen. Martin L. Brandtner	Lt. Gen. Gary H. Mears	Lt. Gen. Edwin S. Leland Jr.	Vice Adm. Richard C. Macke	Maj. Gen. Alan V. Rogers	Rear Adm. Conrad C. Lautenbacher Jr.
1991	Gen. Colin L. Powell	Lt. Gen. Henry Viccellio Jr.	Brig. Gen. Mary C. Willis	Rear Adm. John M. McConnell	Lt. Gen. Martin L. Brandtner	Lt. Gen. Gary H. Mears	Lt. Gen. Edwin S. Leland Jr.	Vice Adm. Richard C. Macke	Rear Adm. David B. Robinson	Rear Adm. Conrad C. Lautenbacher Jr.
1991	Gen. Colin L. Powell	Lt. Gen. Michael P. C. Carns	Brig. Gen. Michael G. Vergamini	Rear Adm. John M. McConnell	Lt. Gen. Martin L. Brandtner	Vice Adm. Jimmy Pappas	Lt. Gen. Edwin S. Leland Jr.	Lt. Gen. James S. Cassity Jr.	Rear Adm. David B. Robinson	Maj. Gen. John D. Robinson
1991	Gen. Colin L. Powell	Lt. Gen. Michael P. C. Carns	Brig. Gen. Michael G. Vergamini	Rear Adm. John M. McConnell	Lt. Gen. Thomas W. Kelly	Vice Adm. Jimmy Pappas	Lt. Gen. Edwin S. Leland Jr.	Lt. Gen. James S. Cassity Jr.	Maj. Gen. Malcolm B. Armstrong	Maj. Gen. John D. Robinson
1990	Gen. Colin L. Powell	Lt. Gen. Michael P. C. Carns	Brig. Gen. Michael G. Vergamini		Lt. Gen. Thomas W. Kelly	Vice Adm. Jimmy Pappas	Lt. Gen. George L. Butler	Lt. Gen. James S. Cassity Jr.	Maj. Gen. Malcolm B. Armstrong	Maj. Gen. John D. Robinson
1989	Gen. Colin L. Powell	Lt. Gen. Michael P. C. Carns	Brig. Gen. Michael G. Vergamini		Lt. Gen. Thomas W. Kelly	Vice Adm. Jimmy Pappas	Lt. Gen. George L. Butler	Lt. Gen. James S. Cassity Jr.	Maj. Gen. Malcolm B. Armstrong	Maj. Gen. John D. Robinson
1989	Adm. William J. Crowe Jr.	Lt. Gen. Hansford T. Johnson	Brig. Gen. Michael G. Vergamini		Lt. Gen. Thomas W. Kelly	Vice Adm. Jimmy Pappas	Lt. Gen. George L. Butler	Maj. Gen. James S. Cassity Jr.	Maj. Gen. Craig H. Boice	Maj. Gen. John D. Robinson
1989	Adm. William J. Crowe Jr.	Lt. Gen. Hansford T. Johnson	(vacant)		Lt. Gen. Thomas W. Kelly	Lt. Gen. Edward Honor	Vice Adm. John A. Baldwin Jr.	Maj. Gen. James S. Cassity Jr.	Maj. Gen. Craig H. Boice	Maj. Gen. John S. Grinalds
1989	Adm. William J. Crowe Jr.	Lt. Gen. Hansford T. Johnson	(vacant)		Lt. Gen. Thomas W. Kelly	Lt. Gen. Edward Honor	Vice Adm. John A. Baldwin Jr.	Vice Adm. Jerry O. Tuttle	Maj. Gen. Craig H. Boice	Maj. Gen. John S. Grinalds
1988	Adm. William J. Crowe Jr.	Lt. Gen. Robert W. RisCassi	(vacant)		Lt. Gen. Thomas W. Kelly	Lt. Gen. Edward Honor	Vice Adm. John A. Baldwin Jr.	Vice Adm. Jerry O. Tuttle	Maj. Gen. Craig H. Boice	Maj. Gen. John S. Grinalds
1988	Adm. William J. Crowe Jr.	Lt. Gen. Robert W. RisCassi	Rear Adm. Roberta L. Hazard		Lt. Gen. Thomas W. Kelly	Lt. Gen. Edward Honor	Vice Adm. John A. Baldwin Jr.	Vice Adm. Jerry O. Tuttle	Maj. Gen. Craig H. Boice	Maj. Gen. John S. Grinalds
1988	Adm. William J. Crowe Jr.	Lt. Gen. Robert W. RisCassi	Rear Adm. Roberta L. Hazard		Lt. Gen. Thomas W. Kelly	Lt. Gen. Edward Honor	Vice Adm. John A. Baldwin Jr.	Vice Adm. Jerry O. Tuttle	Maj. Gen. Frederick M. Franks Jr.	Maj. Gen. Martin J. Ryan Jr.
1988	Adm. William J. Crowe Jr.	Lt. Gen. Robert W. RisCassi	Rear Adm. Roberta L. Hazard		(vacant)	Lt. Gen. Edward Honor	Vice Adm. John A. Baldwin Jr.	Vice Adm. Jerry O. Tuttle	Maj. Gen. Frederick M. Franks Jr.	Maj. Gen. Martin J. Ryan Jr.
1987	Adm. William J. Crowe Jr.	Lt. Gen. Robert W. RisCassi	Rear Adm. Roberta L. Hazard		Lt. Gen. Richard A. Burpee	Lt. Gen. Edward Honor	Vice Adm. John A. Baldwin Jr.	Vice Adm. Jerry O. Tuttle	Maj. Gen. Frederick M. Franks Jr.	Maj. Gen. Martin J. Ryan Jr.
1987	Adm. William J. Crowe Jr.	Lt. Gen. Robert W. RisCassi	Brig. Gen. Sherian G. Cadoria		Lt. Gen. Richard A. Burpee	Lt. Gen. Edward Honor	Vice Adm. John A. Baldwin Jr.	Vice Adm. Jerry O. Tuttle	Maj. Gen. Frederick M. Franks Jr.	Maj. Gen. Martin J. Ryan Jr.
1987	Adm. William J. Crowe Jr.	Vice Adm. Powell F. Carter Jr.	Brig. Gen. Sherian G. Cadoria		Lt. Gen. Richard A. Burpee	Lt. Gen. Alfred G. Hansen	Lt. Gen. Dale A. Vesser	Vice Adm. Jerry O. Tuttle	Maj. Gen. Frederick M. Franks Jr.	Maj. Gen. Martin J. Ryan Jr.
1987	Adm. William J. Crowe Jr.	Vice Adm. Powell F. Carter Jr.	Brig. Gen. Sherian G. Cadoria		Lt. Gen. Richard A. Burpee	Lt. Gen. Alfred G. Hansen	Lt. Gen. Dale A. Vesser	Lt. Gen. Clarence E. McKnight Jr.	(vacant)	Maj. Gen. Martin J. Ryan Jr.
1986	Adm. William J. Crowe Jr.	Vice Adm. Powell F. Carter Jr.	Brig. Gen. Sherian G. Cadoria		Lt. Gen. Richard A. Burpee	Lt. Gen. Alfred G. Hansen	Lt. Gen. Dale A. Vesser	Lt. Gen. Clarence E. McKnight Jr.	(vacant)	(vacant)
1986	Adm. William J. Crowe Jr.	Vice Adm. Powell F. Carter Jr.	Brig. Gen. Sherian G. Cadoria		Lt. Gen. Richard A. Burpee	Lt. Gen. Alfred G. Hansen	Lt. Gen. Dale A. Vesser	Director, C3S		
1986	Adm. William J. Crowe Jr.	Vice Adm. Powell F. Carter Jr.	Brig. Gen. Sherian G. Cadoria		Lt. Gen. Richard A. Burpee	Lt. Gen. Alfred G. Hansen	Lt. Gen. Dale A. Vesser	Lt. Gen. Clarence E. McKnight Jr.		
1985	Adm. William J. Crowe Jr.	Vice Adm. Powell F. Carter Jr.	Brig. Gen. Sherian G. Cadoria		Vice Adm. Huntington Hardisty	Lt. Gen. Alfred G. Hansen	Lt. Gen. Dale A. Vesser	Lt. Gen. Clarence E. McKnight Jr.		
1985	Gen. John W. Vessey Jr.	Vice Adm. Powell F. Carter Jr.	Brig. Gen. Sherian G. Cadoria		Vice Adm. Huntington Hardisty	Lt. Gen. Alfred G. Hansen	Lt. Gen. Dale A. Vesser	Lt. Gen. Clarence E. McKnight Jr.		
1985	Gen. John W. Vessey Jr.	Lt. Gen. Jack N. Merritt	Brig. Gen. Mary A. Marsh		Vice Adm. Huntington Hardisty	Vice Adm. William J. Cowhill	Lt. Gen. Herman O. Thomson	Lt. Gen. Clarence E. McKnight Jr.		
1984	Gen. John W. Vessey Jr.	Lt. Gen. Jack N. Merritt	Brig. Gen. Mary A. Marsh		Vice Adm. Huntington Hardisty	Vice Adm. William J. Cowhill	Lt. Gen. Herman O. Thomson	Lt. Gen. Clarence E. McKnight Jr.		
1984	Gen. John W. Vessey Jr.	Lt. Gen. Jack N. Merritt	Brig. Gen. Mary A. Marsh		Lt. Gen. Richard L. Prillaman	Vice Adm. William J. Cowhill	Lt. Gen. Herman O. Thomson	Lt. Gen. Robert T. Herres		
1983	Gen. John W. Vessey Jr.	Lt. Gen. Jack N. Merritt	Brig. Gen. Mary A. Marsh		Lt. Gen. Richard L. Prillaman	Vice Adm. William J. Cowhill	Lt. Gen. Herman O. Thomson	Lt. Gen. Robert T. Herres		
1983	Gen. John W. Vessey Jr.	Lt. Gen. James E. Dalton	Brig. Gen. Mary A. Marsh		Lt. Gen. Richard L. Prillaman	Lt. Gen. Oren E. DeHaven	Vice Adm. Thomas J. Bigley	Lt. Gen. Robert T. Herres		
1982	Gen. John W. Vessey Jr.	Lt. Gen. James E. Dalton	Brig. Gen. Mary A. Marsh		Lt. Gen. Richard L. Prillaman	Lt. Gen. Oren E. DeHaven	Vice Adm. Thomas J. Bigley	Lt. Gen. Robert T. Herres		
1982	Gen. John W. Vessey Jr.	Lt. Gen. James E. Dalton	Brig. Gen. Mary A. Marsh		Lt. Gen. Richard L. Prillaman	Lt. Gen. Oren E. DeHaven	Vice Adm. Thomas J. Bigley	(vacant)		
1982	Gen. David C. Jones	Lt. Gen. James E. Dalton	(vacant)		Lt. Gen. Philip C. Gast	Lt. Gen. Oren E. DeHaven	Vice Adm. Thomas J. Bigley	Lt. Gen. Hillman Dickinson		
1981	Gen. David C. Jones	Lt. Gen. James E. Dalton			Lt. Gen. Philip C. Gast	Lt. Gen. Oren E. DeHaven	Vice Adm. Thomas J. Bigley	Lt. Gen. Hillman Dickinson		
1981	Gen. David C. Jones	Vice Adm. Carl T. Hanson			Lt. Gen. Philip C. Gast	Vice Adm. Kent J. Carroll	Lt. Gen. Paul F. Gorman	Lt. Gen. Hillman Dickinson		
1980	Gen. David C. Jones	Vice Adm. Carl T. Hanson			Lt. Gen. Philip C. Gast	Vice Adm. Kent J. Carroll	Lt. Gen. Paul F. Gorman	Lt. Gen. Hillman Dickinson		
1980	Gen. David C. Jones	Vice Adm. Carl T. Hanson			Lt. Gen. Philip D. Shutler	Vice Adm. Kent J. Carroll	Lt. Gen. Richard L. Lawson	Lt. Gen. Hillman Dickinson		
1979	Gen. David C. Jones	Vice Adm. Carl T. Hanson			Lt. Gen. Philip D. Shutler	Vice Adm. Kent J. Carroll	Lt. Gen. Richard L. Lawson	Lt. Gen. Hillman Dickinson		
1979	Gen. David C. Jones	Lt. Gen. John A. Wickham Jr.			Lt. Gen. Philip D. Shutler	Lt. Gen. Arthur J. Gregg	Lt. Gen. Richard L. Lawson			
1978	Gen. David C. Jones	Lt. Gen. John A. Wickham Jr.			Lt. Gen. Philip D. Shutler	Lt. Gen. Arthur J. Gregg	Lt. Gen. Richard L. Lawson			
1978	Gen. George S. Brown	Vice Adm. Patrick J. Hannifin			Lt. Gen. C J LeVan	Lt. Gen. Arthur J. Gregg	Lt. Gen. Arnold W. Braswell			
1977	Gen. George S. Brown	Vice Adm. Patrick J. Hannifin			Lt. Gen. C J LeVan	Lt. Gen. Arthur J. Gregg	Lt. Gen. Arnold W. Braswell			
1977	Gen. George S. Brown	Lt. Gen. Ray B. Sitton			Lt. Gen. C J LeVan	Lt. Gen. Maurice F. Casey	Vice Adm. Patrick J. Hannifin			
1976	Gen. George S. Brown	Lt. Gen. Ray B. Sitton			Lt. Gen. C J LeVan	Lt. Gen. Maurice F. Casey	Vice Adm. Patrick J. Hannifin			
1976	Gen. George S. Brown	Vice Adm. Harry D. Train II	Director, J1		Lt. Gen. Ray B. Sitton	Lt. Gen. Maurice F. Casey	Lt. Gen. John H. Elder	Director, J6		
1976	Gen. George S. Brown	Vice Adm. Harry D. Train II	Brig. Gen. Edward A. Parnell		Lt. Gen. Ray B. Sitton	Lt. Gen. Maurice F. Casey	Lt. Gen. John H. Elder	Maj. Gen. Robert E. Sadler		
1975	Gen. George S. Brown	Vice Adm. Harry D. Train II	Brig. Gen. Edward A. Parnell		Lt. Gen. Ray B. Sitton	Lt. Gen. Maurice F. Casey	Lt. Gen. John H. Elder	Maj. Gen. Robert E. Sadler		
1975	Gen. George S. Brown	Vice Adm. Harry D. Train II	Brig. Gen. Edward A. Parnell		Lt. Gen. Ray B. Sitton	Vice Adm. Thomas R. Weschler	Lt. Gen. John H. Elder	(vacant)		
1974	Gen. George S. Brown	Vice Adm. Harry D. Train II	Brig. Gen. Edward A. Parnell		Lt. Gen. Ray B. Sitton	Vice Adm. Thomas R. Weschler	Lt. Gen. John H. Elder	Maj. Gen. Herbert A. Schulke Jr.		
1974	Adm. Thomas H. Moorer	Lt. Gen. George M. Seignious II	Brig. Gen. George E. Wear		Vice Adm. Jerome H. King Jr.	Vice Adm. Thomas R. Weschler	Lt. Gen. Louis T. Seith	Maj. Gen. Herbert A. Schulke Jr.		
1973	Adm. Thomas H. Moorer	Lt. Gen. George M. Seignious II	Brig. Gen. George E. Wear		Vice Adm. Jerome H. King Jr.	Vice Adm. Thomas R. Weschler	Lt. Gen. Louis T. Seith	Maj. Gen. Herbert A. Schulke Jr.		
1973	Adm. Thomas H. Moorer	Lt. Gen. George M. Seignious II	Brig. Gen. George E. Wear		Vice Adm. Jerome H. King Jr.	Lt. Gen. Walter J. Woolwine	Lt. Gen. Louis T. Seith	Rear Adm. Eugene H. Farrell		
1972	Adm. Thomas H. Moorer	Lt. Gen. George M. Seignious II	Brig. Gen. George E. Wear		Vice Adm. Jerome H. King Jr.	Lt. Gen. Walter J. Woolwine	Lt. Gen. Louis T. Seith	Rear Adm. Eugene H. Farrell		
1972	Adm. Thomas H. Moorer	(vacant)	Brig. Gen. Paul C. Watson		Lt. Gen. Melvin Zais	Lt. Gen. Walter J. Woolwine	Vice Adm. John P. Weinel	Rear Adm. Francis J. Fitzpatrick		
1972	Adm. Thomas H. Moorer	Lt. Gen. John W. Vogt	Brig. Gen. Paul C. Watson		Lt. Gen. Melvin Zais	Lt. Gen. Walter J. Woolwine	Vice Adm. John P. Weinel	Rear Adm. Francis J. Fitzpatrick		
1971	Adm. Thomas H. Moorer	Lt. Gen. John W. Vogt	Brig. Gen. Paul C. Watson		Lt. Gen. Melvin Zais	Lt. Gen. Walter J. Woolwine	Vice Adm. John P. Weinel	Rear Adm. Francis J. Fitzpatrick		
1971	Adm. Thomas H. Moorer	Lt. Gen. John W. Vogt	Brig. Gen. Paul C. Watson		Lt. Gen. Melvin Zais	Lt. Gen. Timothy F. O'Keefe	Vice Adm. John P. Weinel	Maj. Gen. Anthony T. Shtogren		
1970	Adm. Thomas H. Moorer	Lt. Gen. John W. Vogt	Brig. Gen. Paul C. Watson		Lt. Gen. Melvin Zais	Lt. Gen. Timothy F. O'Keefe	Vice Adm. John P. Weinel	Maj. Gen. Anthony T. Shtogren		
1970	Gen. Earle G. Wheeler	Vice Adm. Nels C. Johnson	Rear Adm. Percival W. Jackson		Lt. Gen. John W. Vogt	Lt. Gen. Timothy F. O'Keefe	Lt. Gen. Ferdinand T. Unger	Maj. Gen. Anthony T. Shtogren		
1969	Gen. Earle G. Wheeler	Vice Adm. Nels C. Johnson	Rear Adm. Percival W. Jackson		Lt. Gen. John W. Vogt	Lt. Gen. Timothy F. O'Keefe	Lt. Gen. Ferdinand T. Unger	Maj. Gen. Anthony T. Shtogren		
1969	Gen. Earle G. Wheeler	Vice Adm. Nels C. Johnson	Rear Adm. Percival W. Jackson		Lt. Gen. John W. Vogt	Vice Adm. Lot Ensey	Lt. Gen. Ferdinand T. Unger	Maj. Gen. Anthony T. Shtogren		
1969	Gen. Earle G. Wheeler	Vice Adm. Nels C. Johnson	Rear Adm. Percival W. Jackson		Lt. Gen. John C. Meyer	Vice Adm. Lot Ensey	Lt. Gen. Ferdinand T. Unger	Maj. Gen. Dayton W. Eddy		
1969	Gen. Earle G. Wheeler	Vice Adm. Nels C. Johnson	Rear Adm. Percival W. Jackson		Lt. Gen. John C. Meyer	Vice Adm. Lot Ensey	Lt. Gen. William B. Rosson	Maj. Gen. Dayton W. Eddy		
1968	Gen. Earle G. Wheeler	Vice Adm. Nels C. Johnson	Rear Adm. Percival W. Jackson		Lt. Gen. John C. Meyer	Vice Adm. Lot Ensey	Lt. Gen. William B. Rosson	Maj. Gen. Dayton W. Eddy		
1968	Gen. Earle G. Wheeler	Lt. Gen. Berton E. Spivy Jr.	Rear Adm. Percival W. Jackson		Lt. Gen. John C. Meyer	Vice Adm. Lot Ensey	Vice Adm. Nels C. Johnson	Maj. Gen. Dayton W. Eddy		
1967	Gen. Earle G. Wheeler	Lt. Gen. Berton E. Spivy Jr.	Brig. Gen. Walter F. Winton Jr.		Lt. Gen. John C. Meyer	Vice Adm. Lot Ensey	Vice Adm. Nels C. Johnson	Maj. Gen. Dayton W. Eddy		
1967	Gen. Earle G. Wheeler	Lt. Gen. Berton E. Spivy Jr.	Brig. Gen. Walter F. Winton Jr.		Lt. Gen. John C. Meyer	Lt. Gen. Richard D. Meyer	Vice Adm. Nels C. Johnson	Maj. Gen. Dayton W. Eddy		
1967	Gen. Earle G. Wheeler	Lt. Gen. Berton E. Spivy Jr.	Brig. Gen. Walter F. Winton Jr.		Vice Adm. Lloyd M. Mustin	Lt. Gen. Richard D. Meyer	Vice Adm. Nels C. Johnson	Maj. Gen. Dayton W. Eddy		
1967	Gen. Earle G. Wheeler	Lt. Gen. Andrew J. Goodpaster	Brig. Gen. Walter F. Winton Jr.		Vice Adm. Lloyd M. Mustin	Lt. Gen. Richard D. Meyer	Lt. Gen. Berton E. Spivy Jr.	Maj. Gen. Dayton W. Eddy		
1966	Gen. Earle G. Wheeler	Lt. Gen. Andrew J. Goodpaster	Brig. Gen. Walter F. Winton Jr.		Vice Adm. Lloyd M. Mustin	Lt. Gen. Richard D. Meyer	Lt. Gen. Berton E. Spivy Jr.	Maj. Gen. Dayton W. Eddy		
1966	Gen. Earle G. Wheeler	Lt. Gen. David A. Burchinal	Brig. Gen. Walter F. Winton Jr.		Vice Adm. Lloyd M. Mustin	Lt. Gen. Richard D. Meyer	Lt. Gen. Berton E. Spivy Jr.	Rear Adm. Theodore A. Torgerson		
1965	Gen. Earle G. Wheeler	Lt. Gen. David A. Burchinal	Brig. Gen. William A. Tope		Vice Adm. Lloyd M. Mustin	Lt. Gen. Richard D. Meyer	Lt. Gen. Berton E. Spivy Jr.	Rear Adm. Theodore A. Torgerson		
1965	Gen. Earle G. Wheeler	Lt. Gen. David A. Burchinal	Brig. Gen. William A. Tope		Vice Adm. Lloyd M. Mustin	Lt. Gen. Richard D. Meyer	Lt. Gen. Paul S. Emrick	Rear Adm. Theodore A. Torgerson		
1964	Gen. Earle G. Wheeler	Lt. Gen. David A. Burchinal	Brig. Gen. William A. Tope		Vice Adm. Lloyd M. Mustin	Lt. Gen. Richard D. Meyer	Lt. Gen. Paul S. Emrick	Rear Adm. Theodore A. Torgerson		
1964	Gen. Earle G. Wheeler	Lt. Gen. David A. Burchinal	Brig. Gen. William A. Tope		Rear Adm. Lloyd M. Mustin	Maj. Gen. Richard D. Meyer	Lt. Gen. Paul S. Emrick	Rear Adm. Theodore A. Torgerson		
1964	Gen. Maxwell D. Taylor	Lt. Gen. David A. Burchinal	Brig. Gen. William A. Tope		Maj. Gen. Ferdinand T. Unger	Maj. Gen. Richard D. Meyer	Lt. Gen. Paul S. Emrick	Rear Adm. Theodore A. Torgerson		
1964	Gen. Maxwell D. Taylor	Vice Adm. Herbert D. Riley	Brig. Gen. William A. Tope		Maj. Gen. Ferdinand T. Unger	Maj. Gen. Richard D. Meyer	Lt. Gen. Paul S. Emrick	Rear Adm. Theodore A. Torgerson		
1963	Gen. Maxwell D. Taylor	Vice Adm. Herbert D. Riley	Rear Adm. William B. Sieglaff		Maj. Gen. Ferdinand T. Unger	Maj. Gen. Richard D. Meyer	Lt. Gen. Paul S. Emrick	Rear Adm. Theodore A. Torgerson		
1963	Gen. Maxwell D. Taylor	Vice Adm. Herbert D. Riley	Rear Adm. William B. Sieglaff	Director, J2	Maj. Gen. Ferdinand T. Unger	Maj. Gen. Richard D. Meyer	Lt. Gen. Paul S. Emrick	Rear Adm. Theodore A. Torgerson		
1963	Gen. Maxwell D. Taylor	Vice Adm. Herbert D. Riley	Rear Adm. William B. Sieglaff	Maj. Gen. Richard Collins	Maj. Gen. Ferdinand T. Unger	Maj. Gen. Daniel F. Callahan	Lt. Gen. Paul S. Emrick	Brig. Gen. John A. McDavid		
1962	Gen. Maxwell D. Taylor	Vice Adm. Herbert D. Riley	Rear Adm. William B. Sieglaff	Maj. Gen. Richard Collins	Maj. Gen. Ferdinand T. Unger	Maj. Gen. Daniel F. Callahan	Lt. Gen. Paul S. Emrick	Brig. Gen. John A. McDavid		
1962	Gen. Lyman L. Lemnitzer	Vice Adm. Herbert D. Riley	Rear Adm. William B. Sieglaff	Maj. Gen. Richard Collins	Maj. Gen. Ferdinand T. Unger	Maj. Gen. Daniel F. Callahan	Lt. Gen. Paul S. Emrick	Brig. Gen. John A. McDavid		
1962	Gen. Lyman L. Lemnitzer	Vice Adm. Herbert D. Riley	Rear Adm. William B. Sieglaff	Maj. Gen. Richard Collins	Maj. Gen. Fred M. Dean	Maj. Gen. Daniel F. Callahan	Lt. Gen. Paul S. Emrick	Brig. Gen. John A. McDavid		
1962	Gen. Lyman L. Lemnitzer	Lt. Gen. Earle G. Wheeler	Rear Adm. William B. Sieglaff	Maj. Gen. Richard Collins	Maj. Gen. Fred M. Dean	Maj. Gen. Daniel F. Callahan	Rear Adm. William E. Ferrall	Brig. Gen. John A. McDavid		
1961	Gen. Lyman L. Lemnitzer	Lt. Gen. Earle G. Wheeler	Brig. Gen. Charles G. Dunn	Maj. Gen. Richard Collins	Maj. Gen. Fred M. Dean	Maj. Gen. Daniel F. Callahan	Rear Adm. William E. Ferrall	Brig. Gen. John A. McDavid		
1961	Gen. Lyman L. Lemnitzer	Lt. Gen. Earle G. Wheeler	Brig. Gen. Charles G. Dunn	Maj. Gen. Robert A. Breitweiser	Maj. Gen. Fred M. Dean	Rear Adm. Henry S. Parsons	Rear Adm. William E. Ferrall	Maj. Gen. James Dreyfus		
1960	Gen. Lyman L. Lemnitzer	Lt. Gen. Earle G. Wheeler	Brig. Gen. Charles G. Dunn	Maj. Gen. Robert A. Breitweiser	Maj. Gen. Fred M. Dean	Rear Adm. Henry S. Parsons	Rear Adm. William E. Ferrall	Maj. Gen. James Dreyfus		
1960	Gen. Nathan F. Twining	Lt. Gen. Earle G. Wheeler	Brig. Gen. Charles G. Dunn	Maj. Gen. Robert A. Breitweiser	Maj. Gen. Fred M. Dean	Rear Adm. Henry S. Parsons	Rear Adm. William E. Ferrall	Maj. Gen. James Dreyfus		
1960	Gen. Nathan F. Twining	Lt. Gen. Oliver S. Picher	Brig. Gen. Charles G. Dunn	Maj. Gen. Robert A. Breitweiser	Rear Adm. Frank O'Beirne	Rear Adm. Henry S. Parsons	Maj. Gen. Douglas V. Johnson	Maj. Gen. James Dreyfus		
1959	Gen. Nathan F. Twining	Lt. Gen. Oliver S. Picher	Brig. Gen. Charles G. Dunn	Maj. Gen. Robert A. Breitweiser	Rear Adm. Frank O'Beirne	Rear Adm. Henry S. Parsons	Maj. Gen. Douglas V. Johnson	Maj. Gen. James Dreyfus		
1959	Gen. Nathan F. Twining	Lt. Gen. Oliver S. Picher	Brig. Gen. Charles G. Dunn	Maj. Gen. Robert A. Breitweiser	Rear Adm. Frank O'Beirne	Maj. Gen. George O. N. Lodoen	Maj. Gen. Douglas V. Johnson	Maj. Gen. James Dreyfus		
1958	Gen. Nathan F. Twining	Lt. Gen. Oliver S. Picher	(vacant)	Maj. Gen. Robert A. Breitweiser	Rear Adm. Frank O'Beirne	Maj. Gen. George O. N. Lodoen	Maj. Gen. Douglas V. Johnson	Maj. Gen. James Dreyfus		
1958	Gen. Nathan F. Twining	Vice Adm. Bernard L. Austin								
1957	Gen. Nathan F. Twining	Vice Adm. Bernard L. Austin								
1957	Adm. Arthur W. Radford	Vice Adm. Bernard L. Austin								
1956	Adm. Arthur W. Radford	Vice Adm. Bernard L. Austin								
1956	Adm. Arthur W. Radford	Lt. Gen. Lemuel Mathewson								
1955	Adm. Arthur W. Radford	Lt. Gen. Lemuel Mathewson								
1954	Adm. Arthur W. Radford	Lt. Gen. Lemuel Mathewson								
1954	Adm. Arthur W. Radford	Lt. Gen. Frank F. Everest								
1953	Adm. Arthur W. Radford	Lt. Gen. Frank F. Everest								
1953	Gen. of the Army Omar N. Bradley	Lt. Gen. Frank F. Everest								
1953	Gen. of the Army Omar N. Bradley	Lt. Gen. Charles P. Cabell								
1952	Gen. of the Army Omar N. Bradley	Lt. Gen. Charles P. Cabell								
1951	Gen. of the Army Omar N. Bradley	Lt. Gen. Charles P. Cabell								
1951	Gen. of the Army Omar N. Bradley	Vice Adm. Arthur C. Davis								
1950	Gen. of the Army Omar N. Bradley	Rear Adm. Arthur C. Davis								
1950	Gen. Omar N. Bradley	Rear Adm. Arthur C. Davis								
1949	Gen. Omar N. Bradley	Rear Adm. Arthur C. Davis								
1949		Maj. Gen. Alfred M. Gruenther								
1948		Maj. Gen. Alfred M. Gruenther								
1947		Maj. Gen. Alfred M. Gruenther								
