= General Edmonds =

General Edmonds may refer to:

- Albert J. Edmonds (born 1942), U.S. Air Force lieutenant general
- James Edward Edmonds (1861–1956), British Army brigadier general
- Maurice O. Edmonds (born 1931), U.S. Army major general
