= Berton E. Spivy Jr. =

United States Army general (1911–1997)

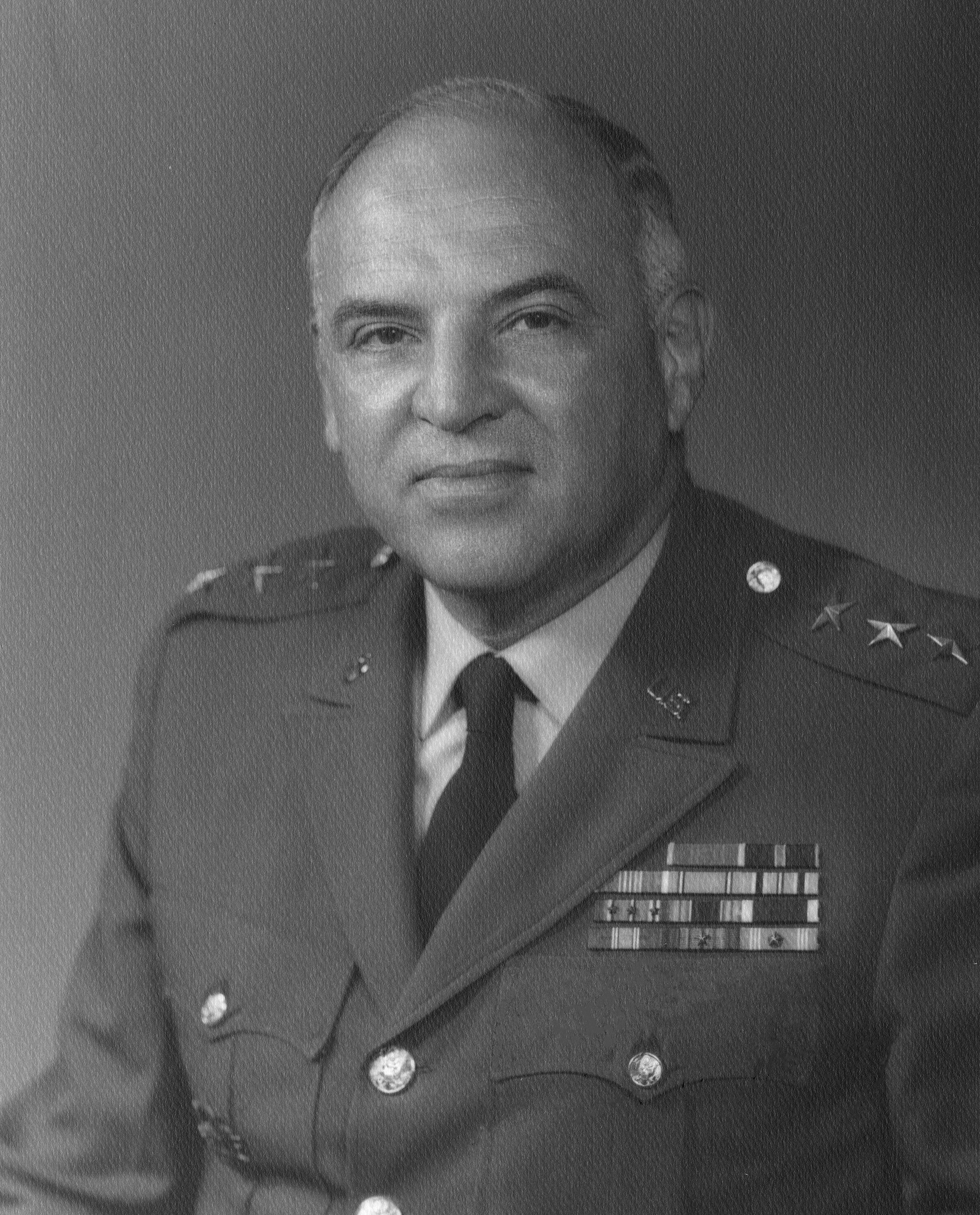
- General Berton E. Spivy Jr.
- Born: 22 December 1911; Muskogee, Oklahoma, U.S.
- Died: 26 November 1997 (aged 85); Dallas, Texas, U.S.
- Burial place: Andice, Texas, U.S.
- Military career
- Allegiance: United States
- Branch: United States Army
- Service years: 1934–1971
- Rank: General
- Commands: 3rd Armored Division
- Conflicts: World War II; Korean War; Vietnam War
- Awards: Silver Star
- Other work: Consultant, Martin Marietta

Berton Everett Spivy Jr. (22 December 1911 – 26 November 1997) was a United States Army four-star general who served as United States Military Representative, NATO Military Committee in Brussels, Belgium, from 1968 to 1971.

== Military career ==
Born in Muskogee, Oklahoma, on 22 December 1911, to Berton Everett Sr. and Maude Bramlette Spivy, who were from Bonham, Texas. Berton Everett Spivy Jr. began his military career at the United States Military Academy at West Point. Upon graduating with a Bachelor of Science degree in 1934, he was commissioned a second lieutenant of Artillery. He attended the Battery Officers’ and Field Officers’ Courses and instructed at the United States Army Field Artillery School located at Fort Sill, Oklahoma. He also attended the British Land/Air Warfare School and the National War College.

Spivy held a variety of staff and command positions while in the United States, Europe, and Asia. During World War II, he served as the Chief of the Field Artillery Branch, G-1, Army Ground Forces and later deployed to Southern France where he joined the Seventh United States Army and served as the Plans and Operations Officer of the Seventh Army Artillery Section for the remainder of the war. Upon returning to the United States, he served as the Deputy G-4, First United States Army, at Fort Bragg, North Carolina, and later commanded the 15th Field Artillery Battalion, 2nd Infantry Division, at Fort Lewis, Washington. Other assignments included duty as the Commandant of the Special Weapons School and Commander of the Special Weapons Unit Training Group for the Armed Forces Special Weapons Project at Sandia Base, New Mexico.

Promoted to the rank of Brigadier General in 1959, he became the Commander of the 7th Infantry Division Artillery, Korea. In 1960, he returned from Korea to command the 1st Field Artillery Missile Brigade at Fort Sill. In the following years, he served in a variety of joint staff positions to include Chief of the JCS Liaison Group to the Director, Joint Strategic Target Planning and as the Director, Plans and Operations (J-3), Headquarters, U.S. European Command. He later returned to troops for a two-year assignment as Commander of the 3rd Armored Division until March 1965.

In April 1965, Spivy was promoted to the rank of Lieutenant General and served as the Director for Plans and Policy (J-5) in the Office of the Joint Chiefs of Staff; subsequently in April 1967, he was appointed Director of the Joint Staff. Promoted to the rank of General in July 1968, General Spivy served as the U.S. representative to the NATO Military Committee until his retirement in July 1971

== Post-military career ==
After retiring from the military, Spivy worked as a consultant for Martin Marietta, advising on military weapons. He died 26 November 1997, of cancer at Baylor Hospital in Dallas, Texas, survived by his second wife, LaNeil Wright Spivy, and two sons. His first wife, Frances Woolfolk Spivy, preceded him in death in 1988. He is buried in Andice Cemetery in Williamson County, Texas.
