= Andice, Texas =

Andice
- Unincorporated Community
- Location within Texas
- Coordinates: 30°46′55″N 97°51′6″W
- Country: United States
- State: Texas
- Counties: Williamson County

Area
  - Total: 0 sq mi (0 km^{2})

Population (2003)
  - Total: 25
  - Density: 0/sq mi (0/km^{2})
- Time zone: UTC-6 (CST)
  - Summer (DST): UTC-5 (CDT)
- ZIP code: 78628
- Area code: 512
- Website: www.andicetexas.us

Andice (/ˈændɪs/ AN-diss) is an unincorporated community located in Williamson County, Texas. It is situated about 15 miles north of Georgetown, Texas and about 38 miles north of Austin. According to the 2000 census, the population was 25; it was 25 in the 2005 census estimate.

== History ==
Also called Berry's Creek and Stapp, Andice is located at the intersection of Farm Roads 2338 and 970, seven miles southwest of Florence in northwest Williamson County. The site was first settled by Joshua Stapp, who built a log structure to serve as a school and church in 1857. In 1876 Andrew Jackson, the proprietor of a small store on Berry Creek near the site of the future town, was appointed postmaster of the Berry's Creek post office, which operated until 1879.

Andice's name dates to 1899 when Rev. William Isaac Newton applied for a new post office to be named after his newborn son, Audice. Postal officials misread the name as "Andice" and approved that name. Today, the common pronunciation of the town name is "an-dice". Taking the name's origin into consideration, the correct pronunciation is "an-diss". The latter is the pronunciation used by older, native residents, but is rare amongst younger generations and recent transplants to the area.

== Geography ==
Andice is located at geographical coordinates 30°46′55″N 97°51′06″W (30.781940, -97.851940).

== Education ==
The Town of Andice is served by the Florence Independent School District.

When the town's schoolhouse was active, into the 1960s, its mascot was the Owls.

== Climate ==
The climate in this area is characterized by hot, humid summers and generally mild to cool winters. According to the Köppen Climate Classification system, Andice has a humid subtropical climate, abbreviated "Cfa" on climate maps.
