= Anthony T. Shtogren =

United States Air Force general

Anthony Thomas Shtogren
- Born: Anthony Thomas Shtogren; May 13, 1917; Boston, Massachusetts, U.S.
- Died: March 22, 2003 (aged 85)
- Burial place: Arlington National Cemetery
- Education: Boston College (BS); College of the Holy Cross (MS); Massachusetts Institute of Technology; Columbia University (MBA)
- Military career
- Allegiance: United States
- Branch: United States Air Force
- Service years: 1940–1971
- Rank: Major general
- Unit: 2d Air Division
- Commands: 2nd Weather Group Air Weather Service
- Conflicts: World War II; Korean War; Vietnam
- Awards: Distinguished Service Medal; Legion of Merit with oak leaf cluster; Army Commendation Medal; Distinguished Unit Citation; Outstanding Unit Award with oak leaf cluster; Croix de Guerre of France.
- Other work: Joint Chiefs of Staff

Anthony Thomas Shtogren (May 13, 1917 – March 22, 2003) was a major general in the United States Air Force.

== Biography ==
Shtogren was born on May 13, 1917, in Boston, Massachusetts. He graduated magna cum laude from Boston College with a Bachelor of Science in chemistry in 1939, then attended the College of the Holy Cross, where he received a Master of Science, summa cum laude, in 1940. After pursuing graduate study at the Massachusetts Institute of Technology, Shtogren received a Master of Business Administration from Columbia University.

Shtogren died on March 22, 2003, and is buried at Arlington National Cemetery. His sister-in-law, Margaret, of Two Rivers, Wisconsin, served in the United States Army as a major during World War II.

== Career ==
Shtogren joined the military in 1940 and was commissioned an officer the following year. During World War II he served with the 2d Air Division.

Following the war he was named Director of Personnel and Administration of the Air Weather Service. He later served as Assistant Chief of Staff and Deputy Chief of Staff of Personnel of the Air Weather Service. In 1951 he was given command of the 2nd Weather Group. From 1954 to 1957 he was stationed in Tokyo, Japan. While there he assisted military leaders of Japan, South Korea, and the Republic of China in the development of a weather service.

After returning to the United States, he was stationed at Westover Air Force Base and Wheeler Air Force Base before being assigned to Pacific Air Forces in 1966. In 1968 he was assigned to the Office of the Joint Chiefs of Staff.

His retirement was effective as of August 1, 1971.

Awards he received include the Distinguished Service Medal, the Legion of Merit with oak leaf cluster, the Army Commendation Medal, the Distinguished Unit Citation, the Outstanding Unit Award with oak leaf cluster, and the Croix de Guerre of France.
