= Ferdinand Thomas Unger =

United States Army general (1913–1999)

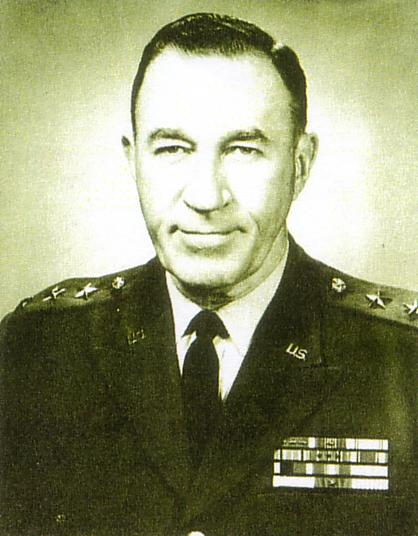
- Ferdinand Thomas Unger
- Born: October 28, 1914; Pittsburgh, Pennsylvania
- Died: January 31, 1999 (aged 84) Arlington Hospital, Arlington, Virginia
- Buried: Arlington National Cemetery
- Allegiance: United States
- Branch: United States Army
- Service years: 1937–1970
- Rank: Lieutenant General
- Conflicts: World War II; Korean War
- Awards: Distinguished Service Medal (2); Silver Star; Legion of Merit (5); Bronze Star Medal (2); Army Commendation Medal (2)

Ferdinand Thomas Unger (October 28, 1914 – January 31, 1999) was a United States Army Lieutenant General, High Commissioner of the United States Civil Administration of the Ryukyu Islands, and governor of the U.S. Soldiers' and Airmen's Home in Northwest Washington D.C.

== Early life ==
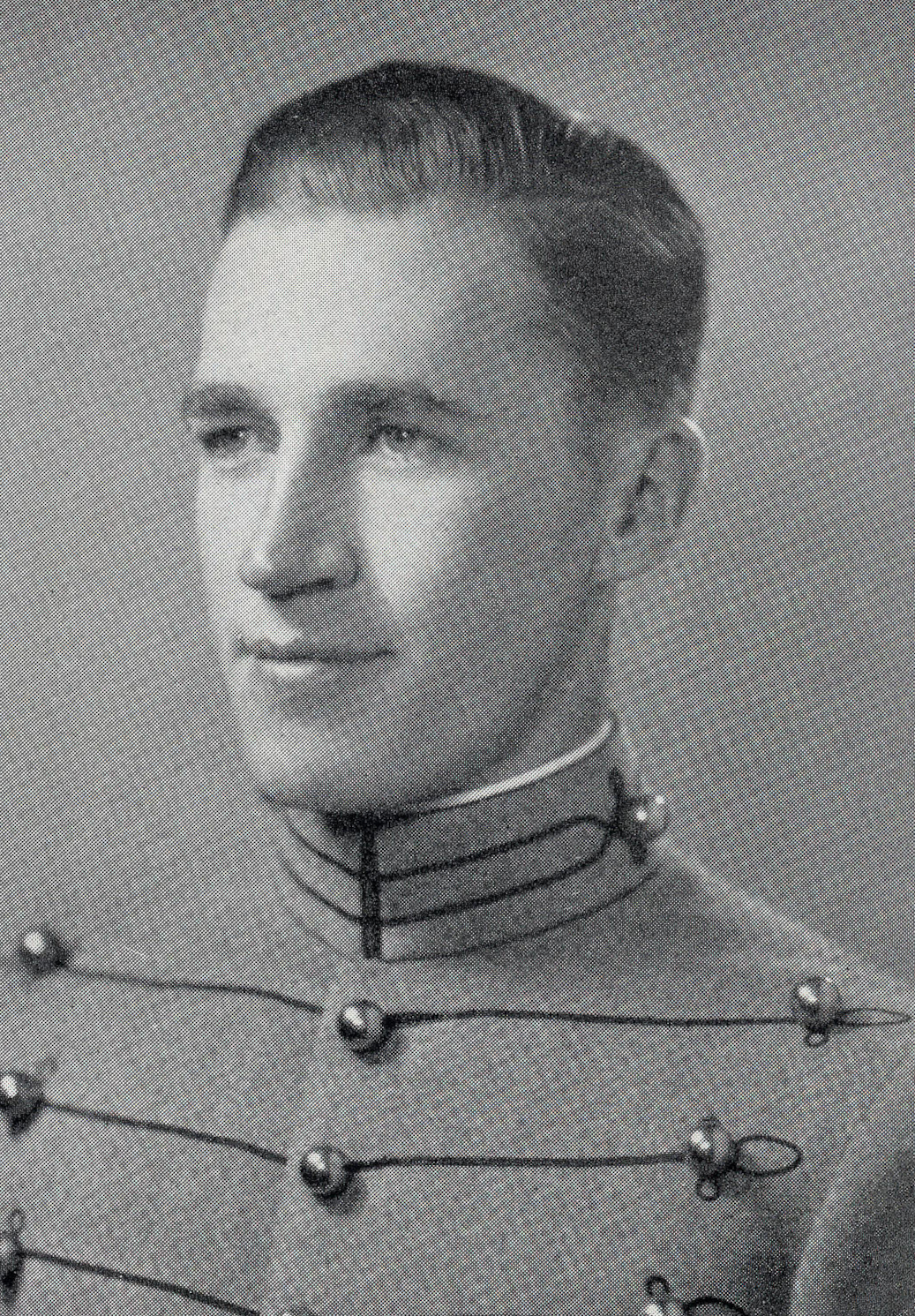
Unger as a United States Military Academy cadet c. 1937

Unger was born in Pittsburgh and briefly attended the University of Pittsburgh. He then transferred to the U.S. Military Academy at West Point, where he graduated in 1937.

During World War II Unger commanded a field artillery battalion in Europe. After the war he served as commanding general of infantry divisions in Germany and Korea. During the Cuban Missile Crisis, Unger served as operations director of the Joint Chiefs of Staff.

== High Commissioner of the Ryukyu Islands ==
From November 1966 to January 1968 Unger served as High Commissioner of the United States Civil Administration of the Ryukyu Islands and commanding general of the IX Corps. During this time he became the first High Commissioner to begin the process of granting more power to the people of the Ryukyu Islands. In his first meeting with the Ryukyu Legislature, he stated a willingness to rescind ordinances passed by his predecessors on the grounds that the legislature pass similar laws to handle the problems the ordinances covered. After consulting with local people, he also pushed the U.S. Government to allow the direct election of the Chief Executive of the Government of the Ryukyu Islands. This resulted, in 1968, in the election of Chobyo Yara, a reform candidate who served until 1972 when control of Okinawa was given back to Japan.

== Later years ==
After leaving Okinawa Unger served as plans and policy director for the Joint Chiefs of Staff until his retirement in 1970. He later served as governor of the U.S. Soldiers and Airmens Home in Washington, D.C. He died on January 31, 1999, and is buried at Arlington National Cemetery with his wife Bayly Bucher (1919–2003).

His honors included two Distinguished Service Medals, the Silver Star, five Legions of Merit, two Bronze Stars and two Army Commendation Medals.
