= Thor Hanson (admiral) =

United States Navy vice admiral (1928–2008)

C. Thor Hanson
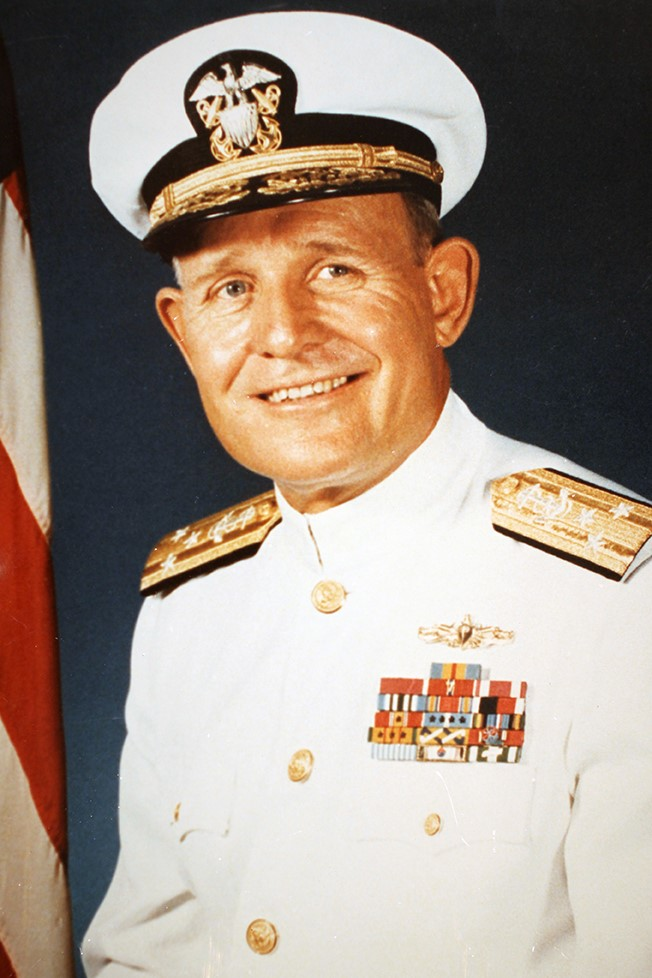
- Born: May 7, 1928; Amarillo, Texas, U.S.
- Died: January 12, 2008 (aged 79); Tucson, Arizona, U.S.
- Military career
- Allegiance: United States
- Branch: United States Navy
- Service years: 1950–1982
- Rank: Vice admiral
- Commands: Director of the Joint Staff

Carl Thor Hanson (May 7, 1928 – January 12, 2008) was a United States Navy vice admiral. He served as Director of the Joint Staff from June 22, 1979, to June 30, 1981. He attended the United States Naval Academy (Class of 1950) and was also a Rhodes scholar.

== Personal life ==
Carl Thor Hanson is father to punk rock drummer, Ivor Hanson. Circa April 1981, while serving as Director of the Joint Staff, he and his family lived on the grounds of the Naval Observatory in Washington, D.C. His son's band at the time, State of Alert, held their practices there and had to be let in by Secret Service agents.
