= Oliver S. Picher =

United States Air Force general

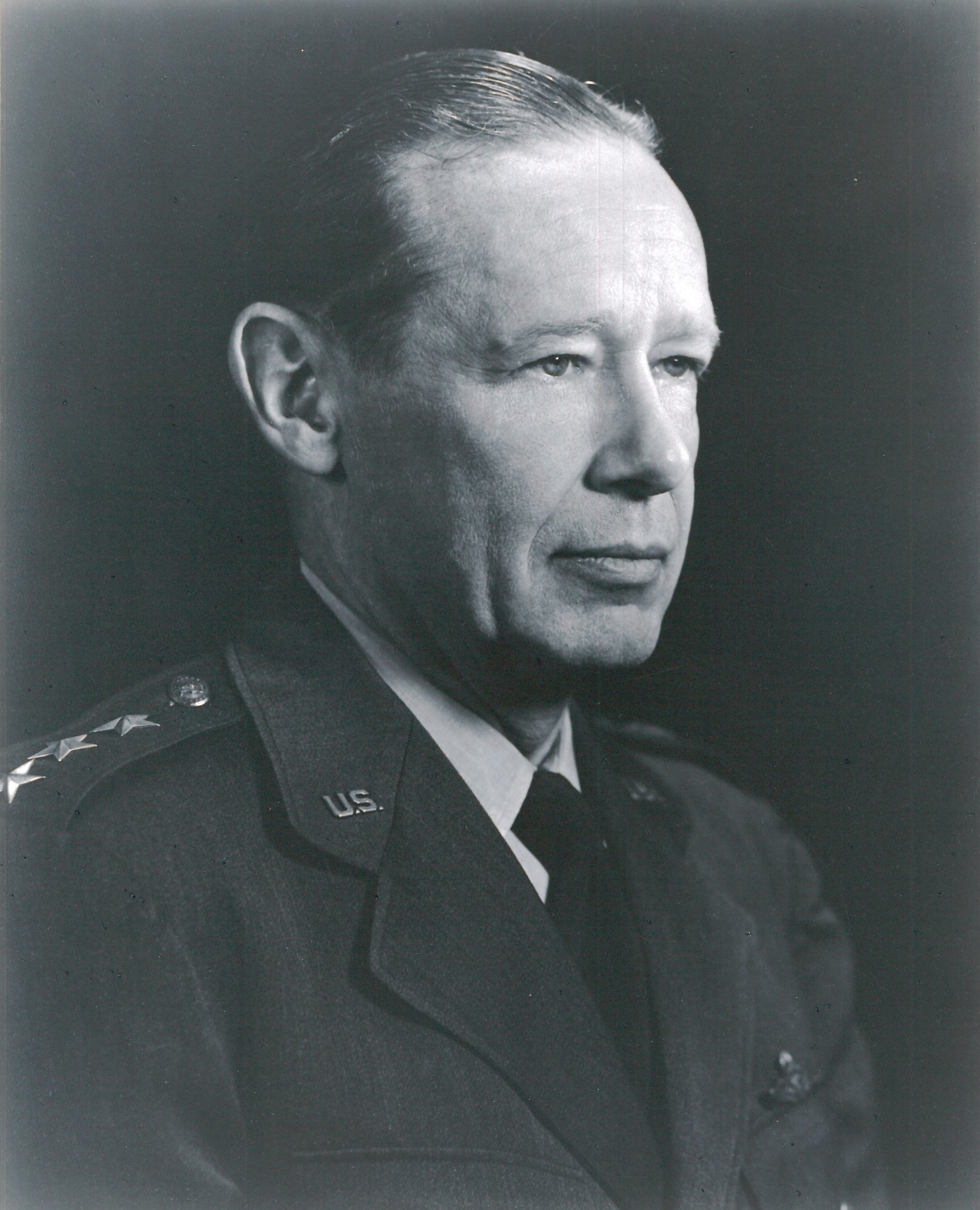
- Born: January 16, 1905; Pasadena, California
- Died: July 20, 1984 (aged 79); Honolulu, Hawaii
- Burial place: National Memorial Cemetery of the Pacific
- Alma mater: Harvard University
- Military career
- Allegiance: United States
- Branch: United States Air Force
- Service years: 1928–1960
- Rank: Lt. General
- Commands: 307th Bombardment Group; 315th Air Division
- Conflicts: World War II; Korean War
- Awards: Air Force Distinguished Service Medal; Silver Star; Legion of Merit (3); Distinguished Flying Cross; Air Medal (5)

Oliver S. Picher (January 1, 1905 – July 20, 1984) was a United States Air Force lieutenant general. He served as commander of the 307th Bombardment Group during World War II, commander of the 315th Air Division in post-war Japan and as the Director of the Joint Staff.

== Biography ==
Oliver Stanton Picher was born in Pasadena, CA, in 1905. He graduated from Harvard University cum laude in 1928. He enlisted as an aviation cadet, earned his wings and was commissioned successively in the Air Reserve and Regular Army.

In May 1930 he went to Hawaii for two years with the 18th Pursuit Group at Wheeler Field. He was in the 6th Pursuit Squadron under the command of Lt. Hoyt Vandenberg who later became Chief of Staff of the United States Air Force. Another squadron in the group was the 26th Attack Squadron under the command of Lt. Nathan Twining who also became Chief of Staff of the United States Air Force, Chairman of the Joint Chiefs of Staff and was Picher's best man at his wedding. He married Marion Lewis on November 9, 1931, at her parents house in the Nu'uanu Pali area of Honolulu. He joined the 35th Pursuit Squadron (later designated the 35th Fighter Squadron) at Langley Field, Va., took the maintenance engineering armament course at the Air Corps Technical School at Chanute Field, Ill. and in October 1936, as a first lieutenant, was assigned to the 7th Bombardment Group at Hamilton Field, Calif.

Lieutenant Picher returned to Hawaii for assignment to the 31st Bomb Squadron at Hickam Field and was promoted to captain in May 1940. He returned home for assignments to the Advanced Flying Schools at Stockton, Calif., and Phoenix, Ariz., with promotion to major. In June 1941 he went to Headquarters Army Air Force, first in organization and equipment and then as executive officer to the assistant chief of staff for operations, advancing to lieutenant colonel. He went to the South Pacific in July 1943 as commanding officer of the 13th Air Force's 307th Bombardment Group.

In October he was promoted to colonel. He flew 34 combat missions and earned the Silver Star, three Legions of Merit, the Distinguished Flying Cross and five Air Medals, serving in combat until February 1945. He returned to Washington for duty with the Operations Division of the War Department General Staff and attended the first class of the National War College. He next served as executive for the director of plans and operations and in June 1948 became director of operations after promotion two months previously to brigadier general. In his new role, he had to mobilize C-54 transports from all over the world to break the Russian blockade of Berlin, known as the Berlin Airlift.

General Picher went to Japan in September 1949 as commanding general of Far East Air Force's 315th Air Division at Itazuke. The following March he became inspector general of FEAF at Tokyo and a year later was named director of personnel in the command, with promotion on March 8, 1952, to major general. He again returned to Washington and became assistant for programming under the deputy chief of staff for operations. In June 1955 he was appointed director of strategic plans for the Joint Chiefs of Staff.

He was promoted to lieutenant general on April 1, 1958 and selected for the position of Director of the Joint Staff. He retired on May 11, 1960.

== Awards and decorations ==
Picher's awards and decorations included the Air Force Distinguished Service Medal, Silver Star, Legion of Merit with two clusters, Distinguished Flying Cross, Air Medal with four clusters and ten campaign medals.

- Air Force Distinguished Service Medal
- Silver Star
- Legion of Merit
- Distinguished Flying Cross
- Air Medal

== Other information ==
- General Picher is also a first cousin twice removed to Edwin Stanton who was Secretary of War under President Abraham Lincoln and United States Attorney General under President James Buchanan.
- Because of his extensive travels throughout Southeast Asia, General Picher gained knowledge and appreciation of Korean pottery. Many of his pieces were donated to the Honolulu Museum of Art including a 15th Century wine bottle.
