= Director of the Joint Staff =

US military three-star officer who assists the Joint Chiefs of Staff

- Seal of the Joint Chiefs of Staff

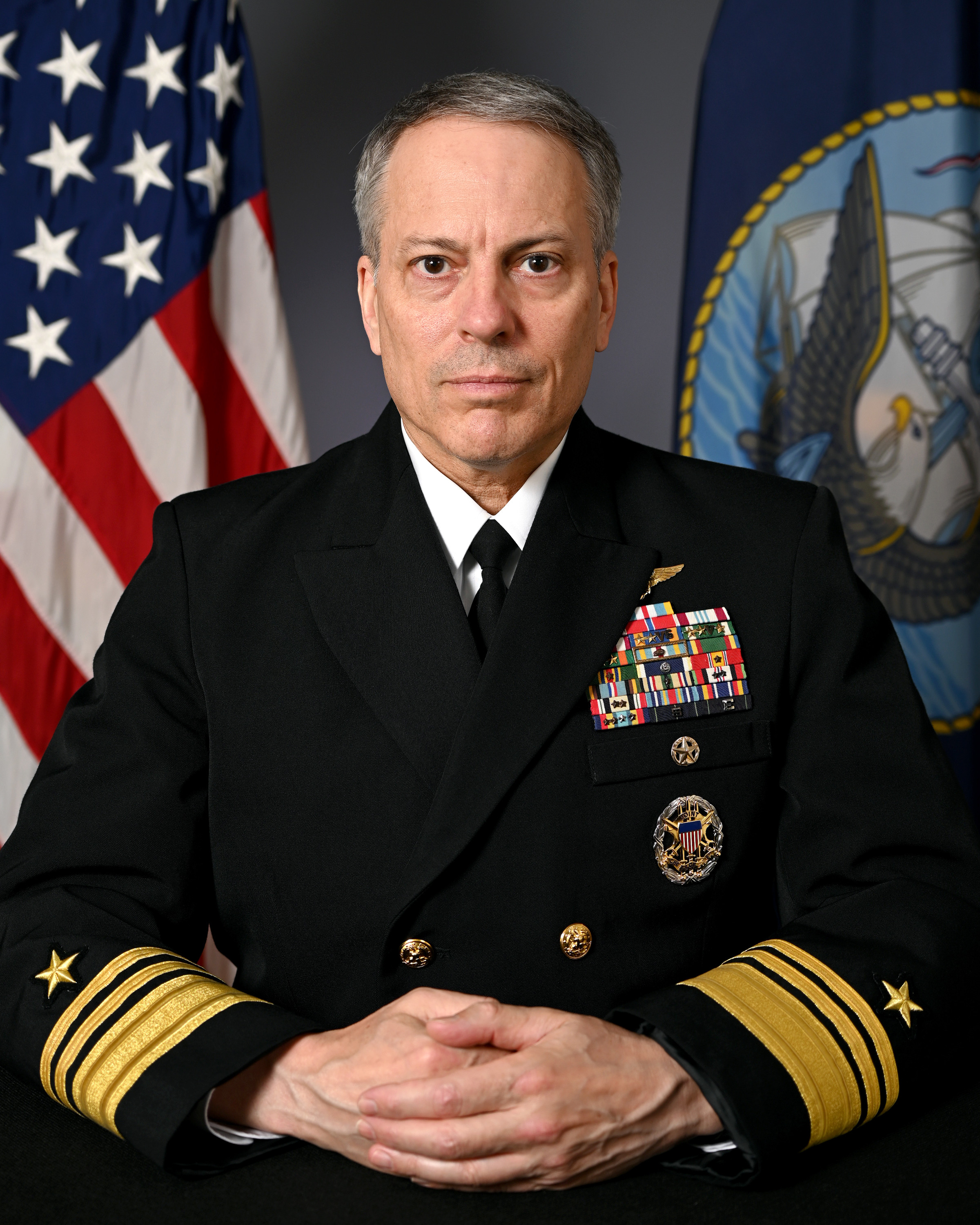
- Incumbent; VADM Paul Spedero Jr., USN since 16 July 2026
- Joint Staff
- Abbreviation: DJS
- Reports to: Chairman of the Joint Chiefs of Staff; Vice Chairman of the Joint Chiefs of Staff
- Seat: The Pentagon, Arlington County, Virginia, U.S.
- Appointer: Chairman of the Joint Chiefs of Staff
- Constituting instrument: 10 U.S.C. § 155
- Inaugural holder: MG Alfred M. Gruenther, USA
- Formation: 19 September 1949
- Deputy: Vice Director of the Joint Staff
- Website: www.jcs.mil

The director of the Joint Staff (DJS) is a three-star officer who assists the Joint Chiefs of Staff, a cabinet of senior military officers within the United States Armed Forces who advise the secretary of defense and the president on military matters. The director assists the chairman of the Joint Chiefs of Staff in managing the Joint Staff and with the management and organization of the staff's members. The director also chairs meetings of the Operations Deputies, a subsidiary body comprising the director and a three-star delegate from each service who preview or resolve issues before they are escalated to the four-star level of the Joint Chiefs of Staff.

The director of the Joint Staff is selected by the chairman of the Joint Chiefs of Staff, in consultation with the other members of the Joint Chiefs of Staff and subject to the approval of the secretary of defense. As with all three- and four-star positions, the director's appointment is subject to presidential nomination and Senate confirmation.

The position of director is considered one of the most desirable three-star positions in the United States military establishment, for the position has historically served as a stepping stone to a four-star position. As of January 2026, 38 of the 50 past directors and one past acting director, have been promoted to four-star rank. Many of them have been promoted to four-star rank within a year of leaving the position.

== List of directors of the Joint Staff ==
This is a complete list of the directors of the Joint Staff. An asterisk (*) indicates an acting Director.

Of the 41 directors of the Joint Staff as of 2012, 30 have been promoted to four-star rank while on active duty, as has one acting director; and a 31st former director was promoted to that rank upon retirement. Moreover, 22 of the last 23 directors have been promoted to four-star rank within a year of leaving the Joint Staff.

| No. | Director | | Term | | | Service branch | Notes |
| No. | Portrait | Name | Took office | Left office | Term length | Service branch | Notes |
|---|---|---|---|---|---|---|---|
| 1 | Alfred M. Gruenther | Major General; Alfred M. Gruenther | 17 September 1947 | 19 September 1949 | 2 years, 2 days | U.S. Army | Promoted to general, 1951. |
| 2 | Arthur C. Davis | Rear Admiral; Arthur C. Davis | 20 September 1949 | 1 November 1951 | 2 years, 42 days | U.S. Navy | Promoted to admiral on retirement, 1955. |
| 3 | Charles P. Cabell | Lieutenant General; Charles P. Cabell | 2 November 1951 | 23 April 1953 | 1 year, 172 days | U.S. Air Force | Promoted to general, 1958. |
| 4 | Frank F. Everest | Lieutenant General; Frank F. Everest | 24 April 1953 | 18 March 1954 | 328 days | U.S. Air Force | Promoted to general, 1957. |
| 5 | Lemuel Mathewson | Lieutenant General; Lemuel Mathewson | 19 March 1954 | 14 March 1956 | 1 year, 361 days | U.S. Army | Retired, 1958. |
| 6 | Bernard L. Austin | Vice Admiral; Bernard L. Austin | 15 March 1956 | 31 March 1958 | 2 years, 16 days | U.S. Navy | Retired, 1968. |
| 7 | Oliver S. Picher | Lieutenant General; Oliver S. Picher | 1 April 1958 | 31 March 1960 | 1 year, 365 days | U.S. Air Force | Retired, 1960. |
| 8 | Earle Wheeler | Lieutenant General; Earle Wheeler | 1 April 1960 | 24 February 1962 | 1 year, 329 days | U.S. Army | Promoted to general, 1962. |
| 9 | Herbert D. Riley | Vice Admiral; Herbert D. Riley | 25 February 1962 | 23 February 1964 | 1 year, 363 days | U.S. Navy | Retired, 1964. |
| 10 | David A. Burchinal | Lieutenant General; David A. Burchinal | 24 February 1964 | 31 July 1966 | 2 years, 157 days | U.S. Air Force | Promoted to general, 1966. |
| 11 | Andrew J. Goodpaster | Lieutenant General; Andrew J. Goodpaster | 1 August 1966 | 31 March 1967 | 242 days | U.S. Army | Promoted to general, 1968. |
| 12 | Berton E. Spivy | Lieutenant General; Berton E. Spivy | 1 April 1967 | 31 July 1968 | 1 year, 121 days | U.S. Army | Promoted to general, 1968. |
| 13 | Nels C. Johnson | Vice Admiral; Nels C. Johnson | 1 August 1968 | 19 July 1970 | 1 year, 352 days | U.S. Navy | Retired, 1970. |
| 14 | John W. Vogt | Lieutenant General; John W. Vogt | 20 July 1970 | 7 April 1972 | 1 year, 262 days | U.S. Air Force | Promoted to general, 1972. |
| – | Mason B. Freeman | Rear Admiral; Mason B. Freeman; Acting | 8 April 1972 | 11 June 1972 | 64 days | U.S. Navy | Retired, 1979. |
| 15 | George M. Seignious II | Lieutenant General; George M. Seignious II | 12 June 1972 | 31 May 1974 | 1 year, 353 days | U.S. Army | Retired, 1974. |
| 16 | Harry D. Train II | Vice Admiral; Harry D. Train II | 1 June 1974 | 30 June 1976 | 2 years, 29 days | U.S. Navy | Promoted to admiral, 1978. |
| 17 | Ray B. Sitton | Lieutenant General; Ray B. Sitton | 1 July 1976 | 30 June 1977 | 364 days | U.S. Air Force | Retired, 1977. |
| 18 | Patrick J. Hannifin | Vice Admiral; Patrick J. Hannifin | 1 July 1977 | 20 June 1978 | 354 days | U.S. Navy | Retired, 1978. |
| – | John A. Wickham Jr. | Major General; John A. Wickham Jr. Acting | 1 July 1978 | 21 August 1978 | 51 days | U.S. Army | Appointed as 19th director. |
| 19 | John A. Wickham Jr. | Lieutenant General; John A. Wickham Jr. | 22 August 1978 | 22 June 1979 | 304 days | U.S. Army | Promoted to general, 1979. |
| 20 | C. Thor Hanson | Vice Admiral; C. Thor Hanson | 22 June 1979 | 30 June 1981 | 2 years, 8 days | U.S. Navy | Retired, 1982. |
| 21 | James E. Dalton | Lieutenant General; James E. Dalton | 1 July 1981 | 30 June 1983 | 1 year, 364 days | U.S. Air Force | Promoted to general, 1983. |
| 22 | Jack N. Merritt | Lieutenant General; Jack N. Merritt | 1 July 1983 | 30 June 1985 | 1 year, 364 days | U.S. Army | Promoted to general, 1985. |
| 23 | Powell F. Carter Jr. | Vice Admiral; Powell F. Carter Jr. | 1 July 1985 | 14 August 1987 | 2 years, 44 days | U.S. Navy | Promoted to admiral, 1987. |
| 24 | Robert W. RisCassi | Lieutenant General; Robert W. RisCassi | 15 August 1987 | 30 November 1988 | 1 year, 107 days | U.S. Army | Promoted to general, 1988. |
| 25 | Hansford T. Johnson | Lieutenant General; Hansford T. Johnson | 1 December 1988 | 20 September 1989 | 293 days | U.S. Air Force | Promoted to general, 1989. |
| – | Gene A. Deegan | Major General; Gene A. Deegan; Acting | 21 September 1989 | 26 September 1989 | 5 days | U.S. Marine Corps | Retired, 1991. |
| 26 | Michael P.C. Carns | Lieutenant General; Michael P.C. Carns | 27 September 1989 | 16 May 1991 | 1 year, 231 days | U.S. Air Force | Promoted to general, 1991. |
| 27 | Henry Viccellio Jr. | Lieutenant General; Henry Viccellio Jr. | 17 May 1991 | 1 December 1992 | 1 year, 198 days | U.S. Air Force | Promoted to general, 1992. |
| 28 | Richard C. Macke | Vice Admiral; Richard C. Macke | 1 December 1992 | 17 July 1994 | 1 year, 228 days | U.S. Navy | Promoted to admiral, 1994. |
| – | Charles T. Robertson Jr. | Major General; Charles T. Robertson Jr. Acting | 18 July 1994 | 24 July 1994 | 6 days | U.S. Air Force | Promoted to general, 1998. |
| 29 | Walter Kross | Lieutenant General; Walter Kross | 25 July 1994 | 12 July 1996 | 1 year, 353 days | U.S. Air Force | Promoted to general, 1996. |
| – | Carlton W. Fulford Jr. | Major General; Carlton W. Fulford Jr. Acting | 13 July 1996 | 13 September 1996 | 62 days | U.S. Marine Corps | Later appointed as the 32nd director. |
| 30 | Dennis C. Blair | Vice Admiral; Dennis C. Blair | 14 September 1996 | 12 December 1998 | 2 years, 89 days | U.S. Navy | Promoted to admiral, 1999. |
| 31 | Vern Clark | Vice Admiral; Vern Clark | 13 December 1998 | 26 July 1999 | 225 days | U.S. Navy | Promoted to admiral, 1999. |
| 32 | Carlton W. Fulford Jr. | Lieutenant General; Carlton W. Fulford Jr. | 27 July 1999 | 14 July 2000 | 353 days | U.S. Marine Corps | Promoted to general, 2000. |
| 33 | Scott Fry | Vice Admiral; Scott Fry | 15 July 2000 | 15 October 2001 | 1 year, 92 days | U.S. Navy | Retired, 2003. |
| 34 | John P. Abizaid | Lieutenant General; John P. Abizaid | 16 October 2001 | 23 January 2003 | 1 year, 99 days | U.S. Army | Promoted to general, 2003. |
| 35 | George W. Casey Jr. | Lieutenant General; George W. Casey Jr. | 24 January 2003 | 15 October 2003 | 287 days | U.S. Army | Promoted to general, 2003. |
| 36 | Timothy J. Keating | Vice Admiral; Timothy J. Keating | 16 October 2003 | 20 October 2004 | 1 year, 4 days | U.S. Navy | Promoted to admiral, 2004. |
| 37 | Norton A. Schwartz | Lieutenant General; Norton A. Schwartz | 21 October 2004 | 29 August 2005 | 312 days | U.S. Air Force | Promoted to general, 2005. |
| 38 | Walter L. Sharp | Lieutenant General; Walter L. Sharp | 30 August 2005 | 22 June 2008 | 2 years, 326 days | U.S. Army | Promoted to general, 2008. |
| – | Stephen M. Goldfein | Major General; Stephen M. Goldfein; Acting | 23 June 2008 | 10 August 2008 | 48 days | U.S. Air Force | Brother of the 43rd director, David L. Goldfein. |
| 39 | Stanley A. McChrystal | Lieutenant General; Stanley A. McChrystal | 11 August 2008 | 11 June 2009 | 304 days | U.S. Army | Promoted to general, 2009. |
| - | Bruce E. Grooms | Rear Admiral; Bruce E. Grooms; Acting | 12 June 2009 | 8 August 2009 | 57 days | U.S. Navy | Retired, 2015. |
| 40 | Lloyd Austin | Lieutenant General; Lloyd Austin | 9 August 2009 | 13 July 2010 | 338 days | U.S. Army | Promoted to general, 2010. |
| 41 | William E. Gortney | Vice Admiral; William E. Gortney | 14 July 2010 | 8 August 2012 | 2 years, 25 days | U.S. Navy | Promoted to admiral, 2012. |
| 42 | Curtis M. Scaparrotti | Lieutenant General; Curtis M. Scaparrotti | 9 August 2012 | 11 August 2013 | 1 year, 2 days | U.S. Army | Promoted to general, 2013. |
| 43 | David L. Goldfein | Lieutenant General; David L. Goldfein | 12 August 2013 | 31 July 2015 | 1 year, 353 days | U.S. Air Force | Brother of acting director, Stephen M. Goldfein. Promoted to general, 2015. |
| 44 | William C. Mayville Jr. | Lieutenant General; William C. Mayville Jr. | 1 August 2015 | 30 July 2017 | 1 year, 363 days | U.S. Army | Retired, 2018. |
| 45 | Kenneth F. McKenzie Jr. | Lieutenant General; Kenneth F. McKenzie Jr. | 31 July 2017 | 28 February 2019 | 1 year, 212 days | U.S. Marine Corps | Promoted to general, 2019. |
| 46 | Michael M. Gilday | Vice Admiral; Michael M. Gilday | 1 March 2019 | 17 July 2019 | 138 days | U.S. Navy | Promoted to admiral, 2019. |
| – | Glen D. VanHerck | Major General; Glen D. VanHerck; Acting | 18 July 2019 | 26 September 2019 | 70 days | U.S. Air Force | Promoted to director. |
| 47 | Glen D. VanHerck | Lieutenant General; Glen D. VanHerck | 27 September 2019 | 3 August 2020 | 311 days | U.S. Air Force | Promoted to general, 2020. |
| – | William D. Byrne Jr. | Rear Admiral; William D. Byrne Jr. Acting | 3 August 2020 | 30 September 2020 | 58 days | U.S. Navy | Vice director of the Joint Staff from September 2019 to May 2021. |
| 48 | Andrew P. Poppas | Lieutenant General; Andrew P. Poppas | 1 October 2020 | 2 June 2022 | 1 year, 244 days | U.S. Army | Promoted to general, 2022. |
| 49 | James J. Mingus | Lieutenant General; James J. Mingus | 2 June 2022 | 3 January 2024 | 1 year, 215 days | U.S. Army | Promoted to general, 2024. |
| 50 | Douglas A. Sims II | Lieutenant General; Douglas A. Sims II | 3 January 2024 | ~July 2025 | ~1 year, 193 days | U.S. Army | Retired, 2025. |
| - | Stephen E. Liszewski | Lieutenant General; Stephen E. Liszewski; Acting | ~July 2025 | 5 December 2025 | ~143 days | U.S. Marine Corps | - |
| 51 | Fred Kacher | Vice Admiral; Fred Kacher | 1 December 2025 | ~26 February 2026 | ~87 days | U.S. Navy | - |
| - | Paul Spedero Jr. | Rear Admiral; Paul Spedero Jr. Acting | ~26 February 2026 | 16 July 2026 | ~140 days | U.S. Navy | - |
| 52 | Paul Spedero Jr. | Vice Admiral; Paul Spedero Jr. | 16 July 2026 | Incumbent | 99 days | U.S. Navy | |

== See also ==
- List of active duty United States four-star officers
- List of United States Army four-star generals
- List of United States Marine Corps four-star generals
- List of United States Navy four-star admirals
- List of United States Air Force four-star generals
