= Maurice O. Edmonds =

American military Major General

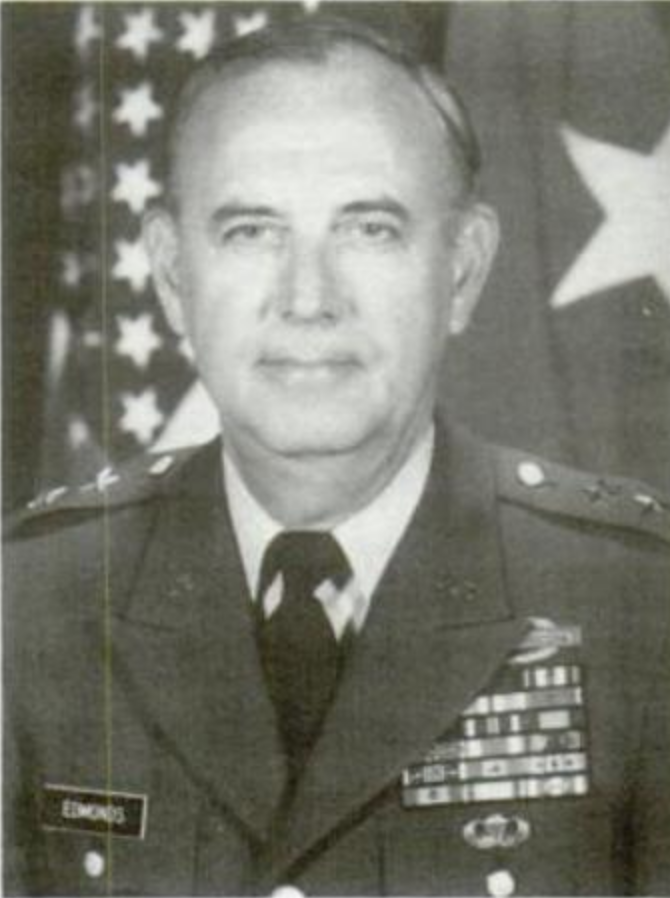
- Born: January 28, 1931 (age 95); Colquitt, Georgia U.S.
- Military career
- Allegiance: United States
- Branch: United States Army
- Service years: 1953–1988
- Rank: Major General
- Commands: United States Army Soldier Support Center

Maurice Owen Edmonds (born January 28, 1931) is a retired Major General in the United States Army. He was commissioned as a Second Lieutenant of Infantry in 1953 after graduation from the University of Florida. Maj Gen Edmonds served two tours in Vietnam. First with the 4th Infantry Division (‘67-‘68), followed by a tour with the 1st Cavalry Division (‘70-‘71). During this tour with the 1st Cav, then-Lieutenant Colonel Edmonds commanded the 5th Battalion, 7th Cavalry which fought in Cambodia in Operation ‘ROCK CRUSHER’, capturing the 2nd largest enemy weapons cache of the war on ‘Shakey’s Hill’ - named for PFC Christopher Keffalos who was killed in action during the operation. During his combat assignments, Maj Gen Edmonds was awarded the Silver Star, the Bronze Star (Valor) the Air Medal (Valor), the Soldier's Medal, and the Vietnam Cross of Gallantry - among other awards. From January 8, 1983, to June 21, 1985, he served as Deputy Chief of Staff for Training of the United States Army Training and Doctrine Command (TRADOC). He later served as Commanding General of Fort Benjamin Harrison, Indiana, and the United States Army Soldier Support Center.
