= Clarence E. McKnight Jr. =

United States Army general (1929–2022)

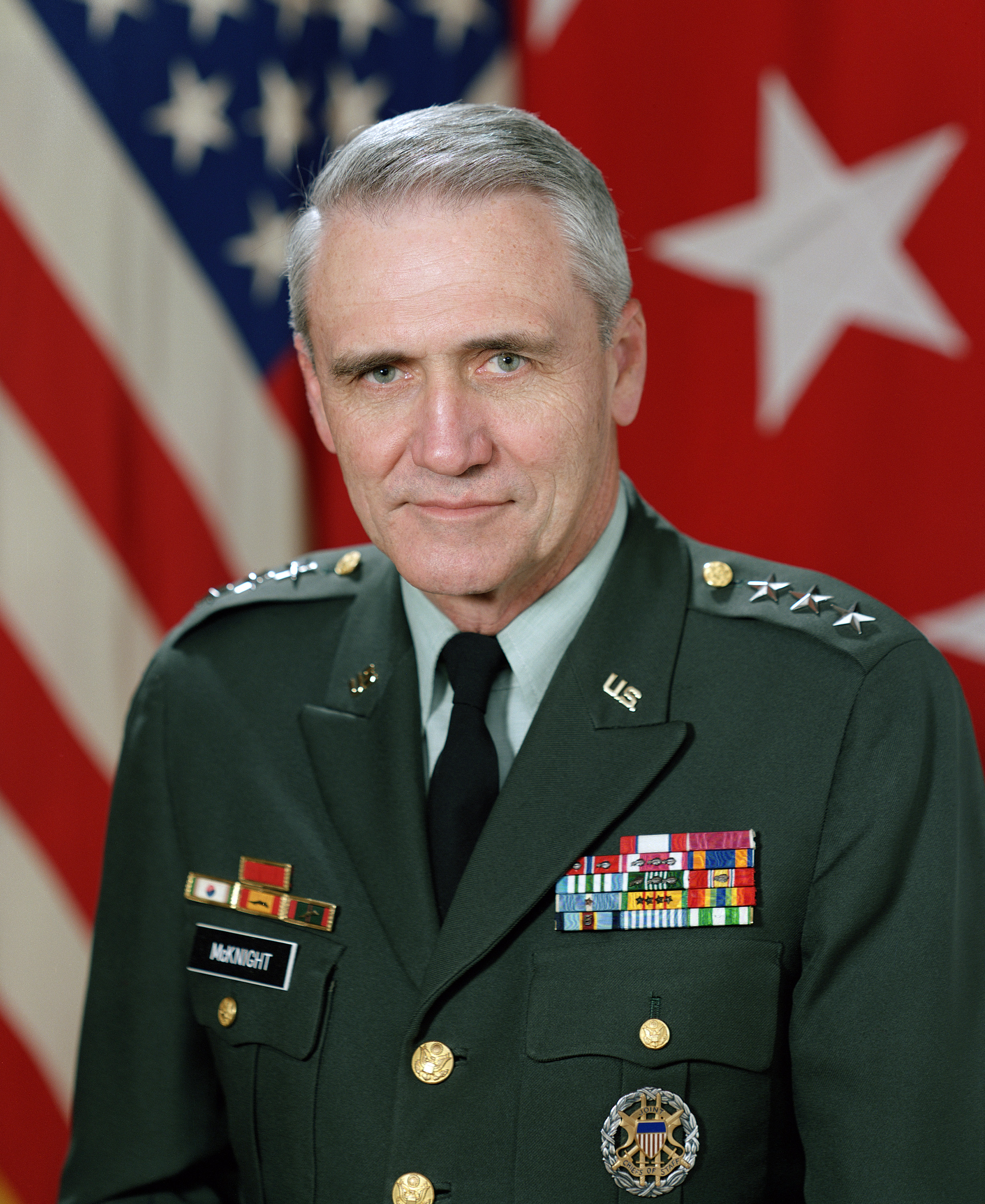
- Born: 9 September 1929; Memphis, Tennessee U.S.
- Died: 29 July 2022 (aged 92)
- Burial place: Arlington National Cemetery
- Military career
- Allegiance: United States
- Branch: United States Army
- Service years: 1952–1987
- Rank: Lieutenant general
- Conflicts: Korean War; Vietnam War
- Awards: Defense Distinguished Service Medal; Army Distinguished Service Medal (2); Defense Superior Service Medal; Legion of Merit; Bronze Star Medal (3); Meritorious Service Medal (4); Air Medal

Clarence Edward "Mac" McKnight Jr. (9 September 1929 – 29 July 2022) was a lieutenant general in the United States Army whose assignments included Director of the Command, Control and Communications Systems Organization of the Joint Chiefs of Staff; deputy commandant and commandant of the Signal Training Centre and commanding general of Fort Gordon. He graduated from the United States Military Academy in 1952 with a B.S. degree in engineering. He later earned an M.S.E. degree in electrical engineering from the University of Michigan in 1961.

His military honors include the Defense Distinguished Service Medal, two Army Distinguished Service Medals, the Defense Superior Service Medal, the Legion of Merit, three Bronze Star Medals, four Meritorious Service Medals and an Air Medal.

After retirement from active duty in 1987, McKnight served as Director of Command, Control and Communications and Intelligence Plans and Programs at Booz Allen Hamilton from which he retired in 1999.

He died in 2022, at the age of 92, and is buried at Arlington National Cemetery.
