= David J. McCloud =

United States Air Force general

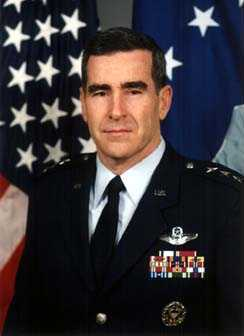
- Lieutenant General David J. McCloud
- Born: February 15, 1945; California
- Died: July 26, 1998 (aged 53); Anchorage, Alaska
- Burial place: Arlington National Cemetery
- Military career
- Allegiance: United States of America
- Branch: United States Air Force
- Service years: 1969-1998
- Rank: Lieutenant General
- Nickname: Marshall
- Commands: 11th Air Force; 1st Fighter Wing
- Awards: Legion of Merit

Lieutenant General David J. McCloud (February 15, 1945 – July 26, 1998) was an American Air Force lieutenant general.

His final assignment was as commander of Alaskan Command, 11th Air Force, and the Alaskan North American Aerospace Defense Command Region, headquartered at Elmendorf Air Force Base, Alaska.

He grew up in Sun Valley, California and was a graduate of John H. Francis Polytechnic High School. He earned a Bachelor of Science Degree in Engineering from California State University, Northridge and a Master of Arts Degree in Management and Supervision from Central Michigan University, Mount Pleasant.

He entered the US Air Force in 1969 and was a distinguished graduate of Officer Training School, Lackland Air Force Base, Texas. He was a command pilot with more than 4,100 flying hours, principally in fighter aircraft. He died 26 July 1998 in Anchorage, Alaska, when the aircraft he was piloting crashed. He was buried in Arlington National Cemetery.

== Military education ==
- 1975 Squadron Officer School, Maxwell Air Force Base, Alabama
- 1975 Air Command and Staff College, Maxwell Air Force Base, Alabama
- 1985 Air War College, Maxwell Air Force Base, Alabama
- 1990 National War College, Fort Lesley J. McNair, Washington, D.C.
- 1991 Program for Senior Officials in National Security, Harvard University, John F. Kennedy School of Government, Cambridge, Massachusetts

== Military assignments ==
- April 1969 - May 1970, student, undergraduate pilot training, Reese Air Force Base, Texas
- May 1970 - January 1971, student, F-102 interceptor pilot training, Perrin Air Force Base, Texas
- January 1971 - March 1973, F-106 Pilot, 94th Fighter Interceptor Squadron, Wurtsmith Air Force Base, Michigan
- March 1973 - February 1975, F-106 Instructor Pilot and Air National Guard Adviser, 191st Fighter Interceptor Group, Selfridge Air National Guard Base, Michigan
- February 1975 - October 1975, F-4D/E Pilot, 31st Tactical Fighter Wing, Homestead Air Force Base, Florida
- October 1975 - December 1975, F-4D/E Pilot, 4th Tactical Fighter Wing, Udon Royal Thai Air Force Base, Thailand
- December 1975 - October 1976, F-4D/E Pilot, Wing Weapons and Tactics Officer, 12th Tactical Fighter Squadron, Kadena Air Base, Japan
- October 1976 - April 1979, F-5E Instructor Pilot, Flight Commander, Chief of Academics and Detachment Commander, 64th and 65th Aggressor Squadrons, Nellis Air Force Base, Nevada
- April 1979 - November 1981, Advanced Air-to-Air Tactics Test and Training Mission Project Pilot, Section Chief for Special Projects, Flight Commander and Assistant Operations Officer, 4477th Test and Evaluation Squadron, Nellis Air Force Base, Nevada
- November 1981 - April 1984, Action Officer and Program Element Monitor, Deputy Chief of Staff, Plans and Operations, Special Projects Office, Headquarters U.S. Air Force, Washington, D.C.
- July 1984 - August 1985, Deputy Assistant Director for Special Projects, Washington, D.C.
- August 1985 - August 1987, A-7D/F-117A Pilot, Assistant Deputy Commander for Operations, 4450th Tactical Group, Tonopah Test Range, Nevada
- August 1987 - August 1989, Director of Advanced Programs, Headquarters Tactical Air Command, Langley Air Force Base, Virginia
- August 1989 - June 1990, student, National War College, Fort Lesley J. McNair, Washington, D.C.
- June 1990 - March 1991, Commander, 24th Composite Wing, Howard Air Force Base, Panama
- July 1991 - June 1993, Commander, 1st Fighter Wing, Langley Air Force Base, Virginia
- June 1993 - August 1994, Commander, 366th Composite Wing, Mountain Home Air Force Base, Idaho
- August 1994 - May 1996, Director of Operational Requirements, Deputy Chief of Staff for Plans and Operations, Headquarters U.S. Air Force, Washington, D.C.
- May 1996 - December 1997, Director for Force Structure, Resources and Assessment, J-8, the Joint Staff, Washington, D.C.
- December 1997 – July 1998, Commander, Alaskan Command, 11th Air Force, and Alaskan North American Aerospace Defense Command Region, Elmendorf Air Force Base, Alaska

== Flight Information ==
- Rating: Command pilot
- Flight hours: More than 4,100
- Aircraft flown: F-15, F-16, F-117, A-7, F-4, F-5, F-102, F-106, OA-37, B-1B, KC-135R, X-29, MiG-17, MiG-21, MiG-23 and others

== Major awards and decorations ==
- Defense Distinguished Service Medal
- Air Force Distinguished Service Medal
- Legion of Merit
- Meritorious Service Medal with three oak leaf clusters
- Air Medal
- Air Force Commendation Medal with two oak leaf clusters
- Joint Meritorious Unit Award with oak leaf cluster
- Air Force Outstanding Unit Award with two oak leaf clusters

== Effective dates of promotion ==
- Second Lieutenant March 31, 1969
- First Lieutenant September 30, 1970
- Captain March 30, 1972
- Major September 1, 1979
- Lieutenant Colonel December 1, 1982
- Colonel April 1, 1988
- Brigadier General July 1, 1993
- Major General September 1, 1995
- Lieutenant General September 6, 1996
