= Albert J. Edmonds =

United States Air Force general

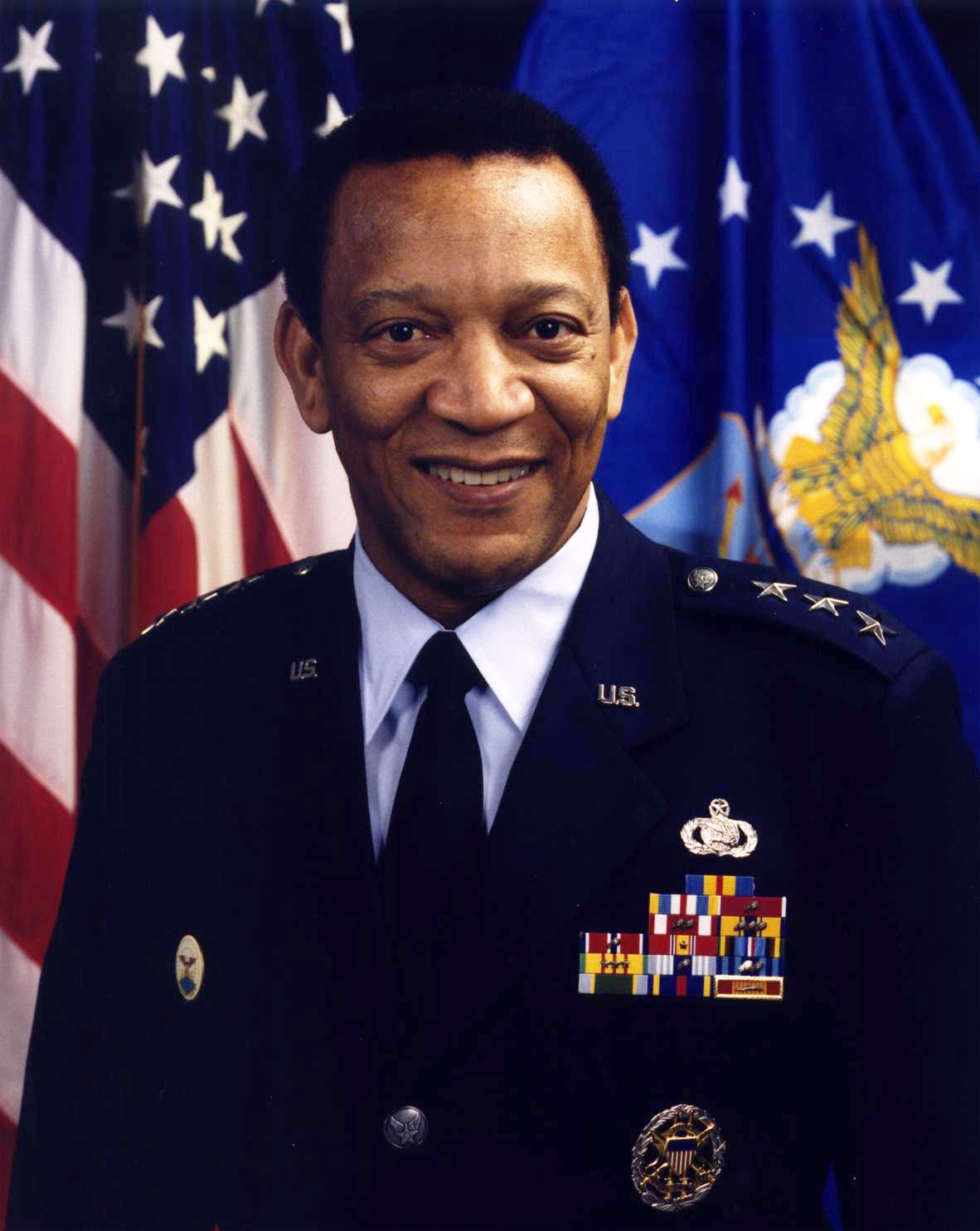
- Born: January 17, 1942 (age 84); Columbus, Georgia, US
- Military career
- Allegiance: United States of America
- Branch: United States Air Force
- Service years: 1964–1997
- Rank: Lieutenant General
- Commands: Defense Information Systems Agency

Albert Joseph Edmonds (born January 17, 1942) is a retired United States Air Force lieutenant general who served as director of the Defense Information Systems Agency from 1994 to 1997. He was born in Columbus, Georgia. Edmonds was commissioned in 1964 upon graduation from the Air Force Officer Training School.

== Biography ==
Born January 17, 1942, in Columbus, Georgia, Edmonds was a career officer in the United States Air Force who eventually achieved the rank of lieutenant general. He graduated from Spencer High School in Columbus and then earned a B.S. degree in chemistry from Morris Brown College in 1964 and his M.A. degree in counseling psychology from Hampton University in 1966. Edmonds attended the Air Command and Staff College and the Industrial College of the Armed Forces in 1974 and graduated from the Air War College in 1980. In 1987, he completed Harvard University's national security program for senior officials.

Edmonds began his military career when he entered the Air Force in 1964 and was commissioned as a second lieutenant after his graduation from Officer Training School at Lackland Air Force Base, Texas. His first assignment was at Keesler Air Force Base, Mississippi, and then in 1966 at Langley Air Force Base, Virginia, as a data systems officer in the Tactical Communications area.

In 1969, Edmonds was assigned at Hickam Air Force Base, Hawaii, as the inspection team chief and director of emergency mission support for the Pacific Communications Area. His first overseas assignment came when he was assigned to Takhli Royal Thai Air Force Base, Thailand, as the Chief of Operations with the 2083rd Communications Squadron.

In 1973, Edmonds received his first Pentagon assignment at Headquarters, U.S. Air Force, Washington, D.C. where he was responsible for the air communications programs in the continental United States, Alaska, Canada, South America, Greenland, and Iceland. After a two-year assignment beginning in 1975 at the Defense Communications Agency in Arlington, Virginia, he in 1977 was assigned to Anderson Air Force Base, Guam as the director of communications-electronics, Strategic Air Command's 3rd division and as the commander of the 27th communications squadron.

In 1979, he attended the Air War College at Maxwell Air Force Base, Alabama. After graduating in 1980, Edmonds returned to Headquarters, Air Force to work in the Office of the Deputy Chief of Staff, Plans and Operations. In 1983, he was assigned to Headquarters, Tactical Air Command, Langley Air Force Base but by 1988, he was named director of the Command, Control, Communications and Computer Systems Directorate, U.S. Central Command, MacDill Air Force Base, Florida. This command was responsible for U.S. military interests in 19 countries across the Horn of Africa, Persian Gulf, and Southwest Asia.

From 1989 to 1990, Edwards was assistant chief of staff, systems for command, control, communications and computers at Air Force headquarters. In 1991, he was given the role of director for this command.

General Edmonds was awarded the Defense Distinguished Service Medal, Defense Superior Service Medal, Legion of Merit, Meritorious Service Medal and the Air Force Commendation Medal. On July 1, 1988, Edmond received his promotion to brigadier general. He would later be promoted to major general in 1991 and lieutenant general in 1993.

In 1993, Edmonds became director for Command, Control, Communications, and Computer Systems (J-6) on the Joint Staff. In 1994, he became director of the Defense Information Systems Agency and manager of the National Communications System.

In 1998, after retiring from the Air Force on August 1, 1997, Edmonds joined Electronic Data Systems (EDS) and from 1998 to 2004 held multiple positions within the company, including president of the EDS, U.S. Government Division, vice president of EDS Government Global Industry Group, vice president and chief operating officer, EDS Federal, and president of EDS Military Systems Strategic Business Unit. Since 2004 Edmonds has served as the president and CEO of Edmonds Enterprise Services, a small business that provides consulting and logistical support services primarily to the U.S. government. General Edmonds is married to Jacquelyn McDaniel and has three children, Gia, Sherri, and Alicia.

== Personal ==
In the 2024 United States presidential election, Edmonds endorsed Kamala Harris.
