= Robert Chadwick II =

U.S. Navy admiral

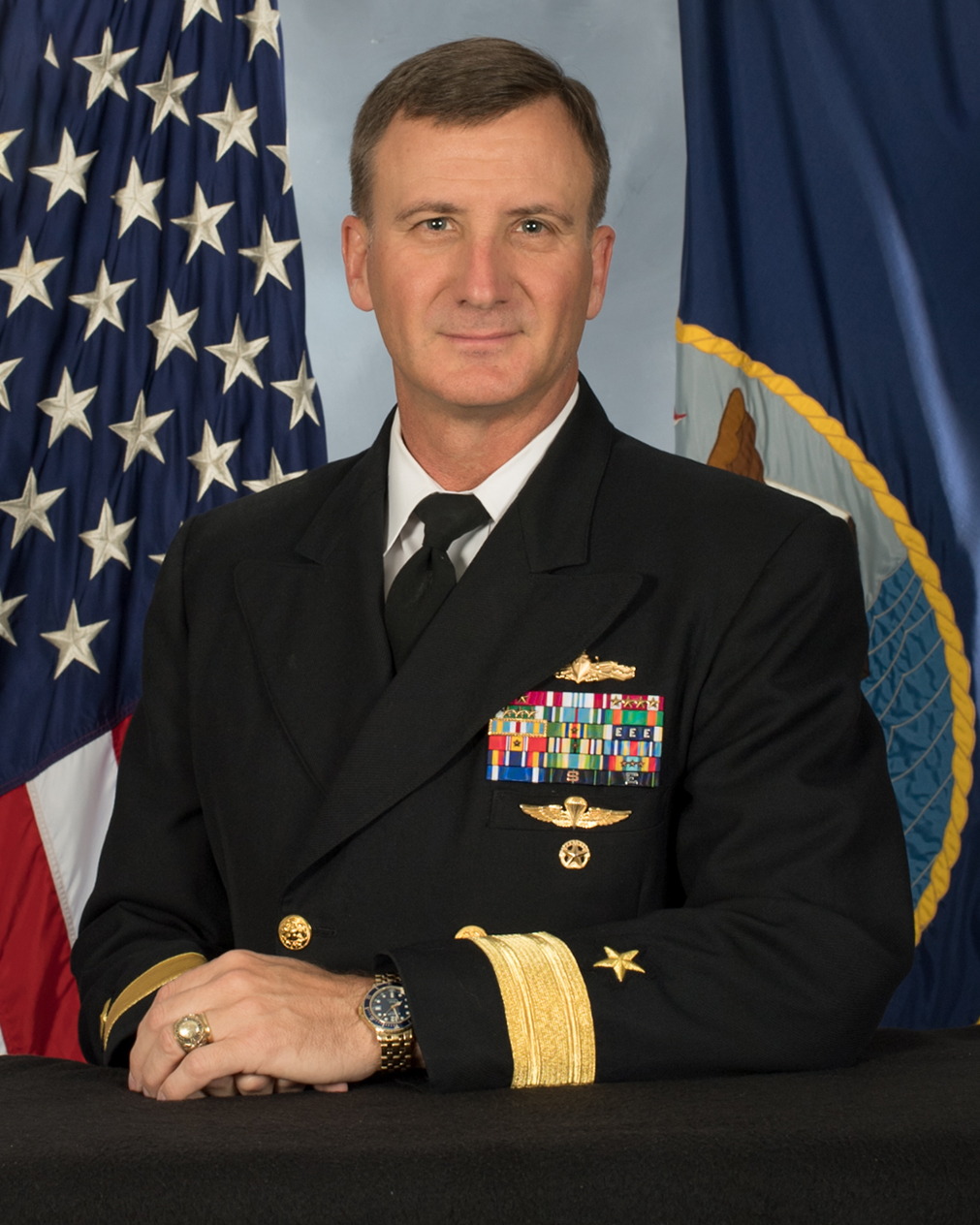
- Born: Bethesda, Maryland, U.S.
- Education: United States Naval Academy; Naval Postgraduate School (MNSA); National War College (MNSS)
- Relatives: Rear Adm. Stephen K. Chadwick (father)
- Military career
- Allegiance: United States
- Branch: United States Navy
- Service years: 1991–present
- Rank: Rear Admiral (lower half)
- Nickname: Robb
- Commands: Carrier Strike Group 9 Navy Region Hawaii; Naval Surface Group Middle Pacific; Commandant of Midshipmen; Destroyer Squadron 21; USS Roosevelt (DDG-80)
- Awards: Legion of Merit (3)

Robert Berry Chadwick II is a United States Navy rear admiral and surface warfare officer who served as the commander of Carrier Strike Group 9 from July 9, 2021 to June 2, 2023. He served as the commander of Navy Region Hawaii and Naval Surface Group Middle Pacific from June 14, 2019 to June 18, 2021. Prior to that, Chadwick served as the 87th Commandant of Midshipmen at the United States Naval Academy from June 2017 to June 2019, with tours as commander of Destroyer Squadron 21 from March 2015 to August 2016 and commanding officer of USS Roosevelt (DDG-80) from November 2010 to July 2011.

He briefly served as acting commanding officer of the USS Cowpens (CG-63) from June to August 2014 after its 3rd CO, Captain Gregory W. Gombert was relieved due to loss of confidence in his ability to command.

A native of Bethesda, Maryland, Chadwick earned his commission from the United States Naval Academy in 1991. He also earned a master's degree in National Security Affairs, Middle Eastern Affairs from the Naval Postgraduate School and a master’s degree in National Security Strategy from the National War College. His father, Stephen Chadwick also served as the 71st Commandant of Midshipmen as well as commander of Navy Region Hawaii.

== Awards and decorations ==
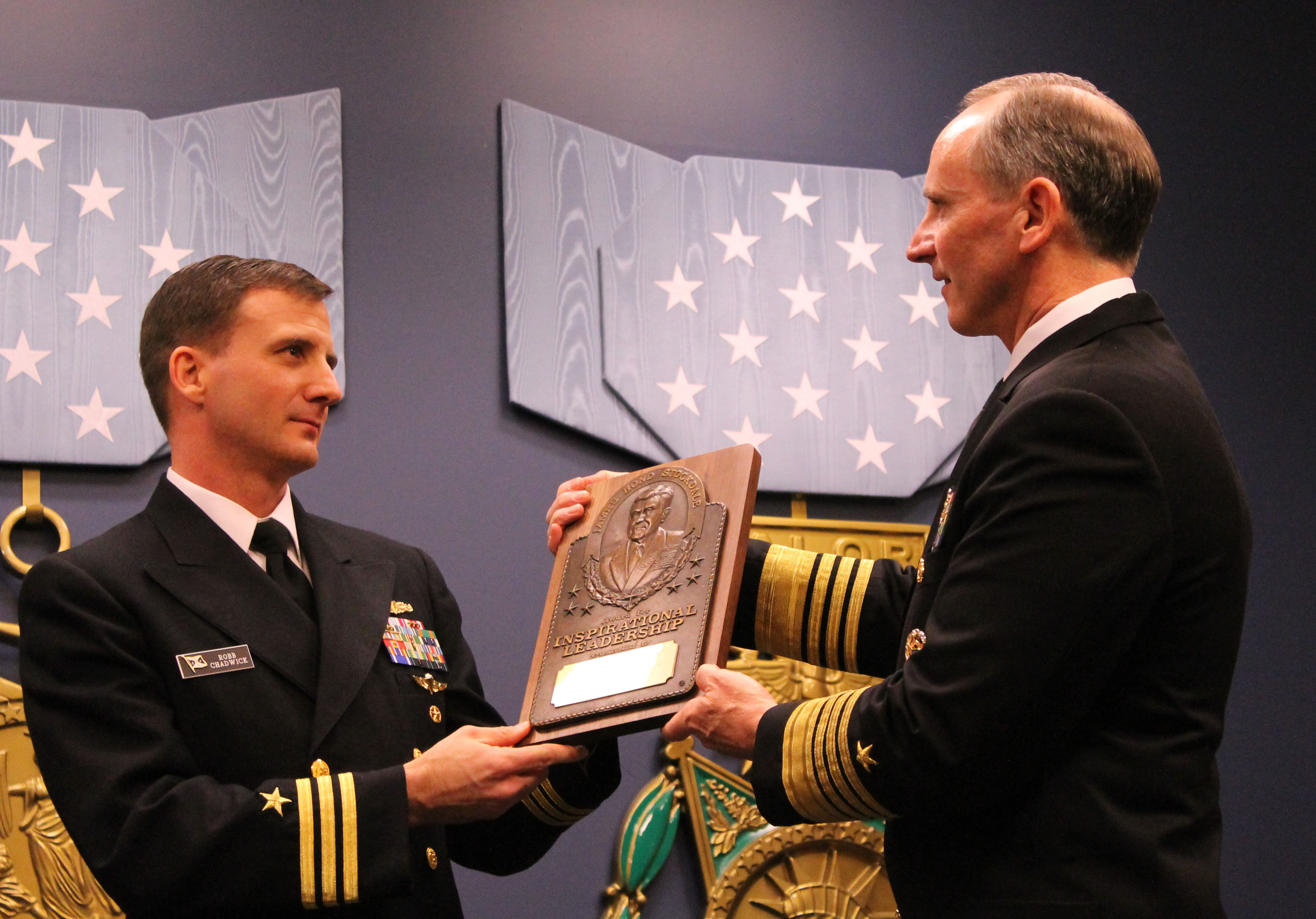
Chadwick is presented with the Vice Admiral James Bond Stockdale Leadership Award by the Chief of Naval Operations, Admiral Jonathan W. Greenert on January 5, 2012.

Surface Warfare Officer Pin
Legion of Merit with two award stars	Defense Meritorious Service Medal	Meritorious Service Medal with four award stars
Navy and Marine Corps Commendation Medal with two award stars	Joint Service Achievement Medal	Navy and Marine Corps Achievement Medal
Joint Meritorious Unit Commendation	Navy Unit Commendation with bronze service star	Navy "E" Ribbon, 3rd award
National Defense Service Medal with bronze service star	Southwest Asia Service Medal with bronze service star	Global War on Terrorism Expeditionary Medal
Global War on Terrorism Service Medal	Armed Forces Service Medal	Navy Sea Service Deployment Ribbon with three bronze service stars
NATO Medal for the former Yugoslavia	Navy Rifle Marksmanship Ribbon with Sharpshooter Device	Navy Expert Pistol Shot Ribbon
Navy and Marine Corps Parachutist Insignia
Command at Sea insignia

Military offices
Preceded by Stanley O. Keeve Jr.	Commanding Officer of USS Roosevelt (DDG-80); 2010–2011	Succeeded by Robert S. Thompson
Preceded by Gregory W. Gombert	Commanding Officer of USS Cowpens (CG-63); Acting; 2014	Succeeded by Michael S. Sciretta
Preceded by Brian K. Shipman	Commander of Destroyer Squadron 21; 2015–2016	Succeeded by Henry C. Adams
Preceded by Stephen E. Liszewski	Commandant of Midshipmen of the United States Naval Academy; 2017–2019	Succeeded by Thomas R. Buchanan
Preceded by Brian P. Fort	Commander of Navy Region Hawaii; 2019–2021	Succeeded by Timothy J. Kott
Preceded by Douglas C. Verissimo	Commander of Carrier Strike Group 9; 2021–2023	Succeeded by Christopher D. Alexander
