= Commandant of midshipmen =

United States naval academy position

The commandant of midshipmen is the second-in-command at the United States Naval Academy. According to the Naval Academy, the commandant of midshipmen is "responsible for the professional development and day-to-day activities of all 4,400 Midshipmen in the Brigade" and equates to a dean of students at a civilian university. The commandant reports to the superintendent. The commandant is assisted by a deputy commandant. Modern commandants typically hold the Navy rank of captain, but since 2002, three of the commandants have been a United States Marine Corps colonel. The current commandant is Austin “A.J.” Jackson, USN.

== List of commandants of midshipmen ==
1. Lieutenant James Harman Ward 1845–1847
2. Lieutenant Sydney Smith Lee 1848–1851
3. Lieutenant Thomas Tingey Craven 1851–1855
4. Lieutenant Joseph Foster Green 1855–1858
5. Commander Thomas Tingey Craven 1858–1860
6. Lieutenant Christopher Raymond Perry Rodgers 1860–1861
7. Lieutenant George Washington Rodgers 1861–1862
8. Lieutenant Edward Simpson 1862–1863
9. Commander Thomas G. Corbin 1863–1863
10. Commander Donald McNeill Fairfax 1863–1865
11. Lieutenant Commander Stephen B. Luce 1865–1868
12. Captain Napoleon Bonaparte Harrison 1868–1870
13. Captain Samuel P. Carter 1870–1873
14. Commander Kidder Randolph Breese 1873–1875
15. Commander Edward A. Terry 1875–1878
16. Commander Frederick Vallette McNair, Sr. 1878–1883
17. Commander Norman von Heldreich Farquhar 1883–1886
18. Commander Charles Lathrop Huntington 1886–1887
19. Commander Purnell Frederick Harrington 1887–1889
20. Commander Henry Glass 1889–1891
21. Commander Colby Mitchell Chester 1891–1895
22. Commander Willard Herbert Brownson 1895–1896
23. Commander Edwin White 1896–1898
24. Commander Charles Thomas Hutchins 1898–1900
25. Commander Charles Ellwood Colahan 1900–1903
26. Commander Charles Johnston Badger 1903–1905
27. Captain George Partridge Colvocoresses 1905–1907
28. Commander William S. Benson 1907–1908
29. Commander Charles Augustus Gove 1908–1909
30. Commander George Ramsey Clark 1909–1910
31. Commander Robert Edward Coontz 1910–1911
32. Commander George Wood Logan 1911–1914
33. Captain Guy Hamilton Burrage 1914–1915
34. Captain Lloyd Horwitz Chandler Summer 1915
35. Captain Louis McCoy Nulton 1915–1918
36. Captain William H. Standley 1918–1919
37. Captain Wat Tyler Cluverius, Jr. 1919–1921
38. Captain Thomas Richardson Kurtz 1921–1924
39. Captain Harold Earle Cook 1924–1925
40. Captain Sinclair Gannon 1925–1928
41. Captain Charles Philip Snyder 1928–1931
42. Captain Henry David Cooke, Jr. 1931–1932
43. Captain Ralston Smith Holmes 1932–1935
44. Captain Forde Anderson Todd 1935–1937
45. Rear Admiral Milo Frederick Draemel 1937–1940
46. Captain Francis Alfred L. Vossler 1940–1941
47. Captain Mahlon Tisdale 1941–1942
48. Captain Harvey Edward Overesch 1942–1943
49. Captain Stuart Shadrick Murray 1943–1945
50. Rear Admiral Stuart Howe Ingersoll 1945–1947
51. Captain Frank Trenwith Ward 1947–1949
52. Captain Carleton R. Adams 1949
53. Captain Robert B. Pirie 1949–1952
54. Rear Admiral Charles Allen Buchanan–1952–1954
55. Captain Robert T.S. Keith 1954–1956
56. Captain Allen M. Shinn 1956–1958
57. Captain Frederick L. Ashworth 1958
58. Captain William F. Bringle 1958–1960
59. Captain James H. Mini 1960–1961
60. Captain Charles S. Minter, Jr. 1961–1964
61. Captain Sheldon H. Kinney 1964–1967
62. Captain Lawrence T. Heyworth Jr. 1967–1969
63. Captain Robert P. Coogan 1969–1971
64. Captain Max K. Morris 1971–1973
65. Captain Donald K. Forbes 1973–1976
66. Captain James A. Winnefeld 1976–1978
67. Captain Jack N. Darby 1978–1979
68. Rear Admiral William F. "Scot" McCauley 1979–1981
69. Captain Leon A. Edney 1981–1984
70. Captain Leslie N. Palmer 1984
71. Captain Stephen K. Chadwick 1985–1987
72. Captain Howard W. Habermeyer Jr. 1987–1990
73. Captain Joseph W. Prueher 1989–1990
74. Captain Michael D. Haskins 1990–1992
75. Captain John Bramwell Padgett, III 1992–1994
76. Captain William T. R. "Randy" Bogle 1994–1997
77. Captain Gary Roughead 1997–December 1999
78. Captain Samuel J. Locklear 1999–December 2001
79. Colonel John R. Allen January 2002–September 2003 (first Marine Corps officer to serve as commandant; selected brigadier general, January 2003)
80. Captain Charles J. "Joe" Leidig, Jr. September 2003–June 2005
81. Captain Bruce E. Grooms June 2005–December 2006
82. Captain Margaret D. Klein December 2006–June 2008 (first woman to serve as commandant)
83. Captain Matthew L. Klunder June 2008–April 2010
84. Captain Robert E. Clark II April 2010–May 2013
85. Captain William D. Byrne Jr. May 2013–June 2015
86. Colonel Stephen E. Liszewski June 2015–June 2017
87. Captain Robert B. Chadwick June 2017–June 2019
88. Captain Thomas R. Buchanan June 2019–2021
89. Colonel James “J.P.” McDonough III 2021–June 2024
90. Captain Walter H. Allman III June 2024–July2025
91. Captain Gilbert E. Clark Jr. July 2025–November 2025

Acting: Captain Austin “A.J.” Jackson November 2025–June 2026

92. Captain Clinton "Clint" Cornell June 2026–Present
