= Admiral Briggs =

Admiral Briggs may refer to:

- Charles Briggs (Royal Navy officer) (1858–1951), British Royal Navy admiral
- Edward S. Briggs (1926–2022), U.S. Navy vice admiral
- Thomas Briggs (Royal Navy officer) (1780–1852), British Royal Navy admiral
- Tommy Briggs, a character in the game Call of Duty: Black Ops II, portrayed by Tony Todd
