= William McCauley =

William McCauley may refer to:

- William McCauley (American football), American football player and coach
- William F. McCauley, United States Navy admiral
- William J. McCauley, American attorney and politician
- Bill McCauley, Major League Baseball player

== See also ==
- William Macaulay (disambiguation)
- William McAuley (born 1975), better known by his stage name Bleu, American musician
