= Timothy Kott =

U.S. Navy admiral

Timothy J. Kott
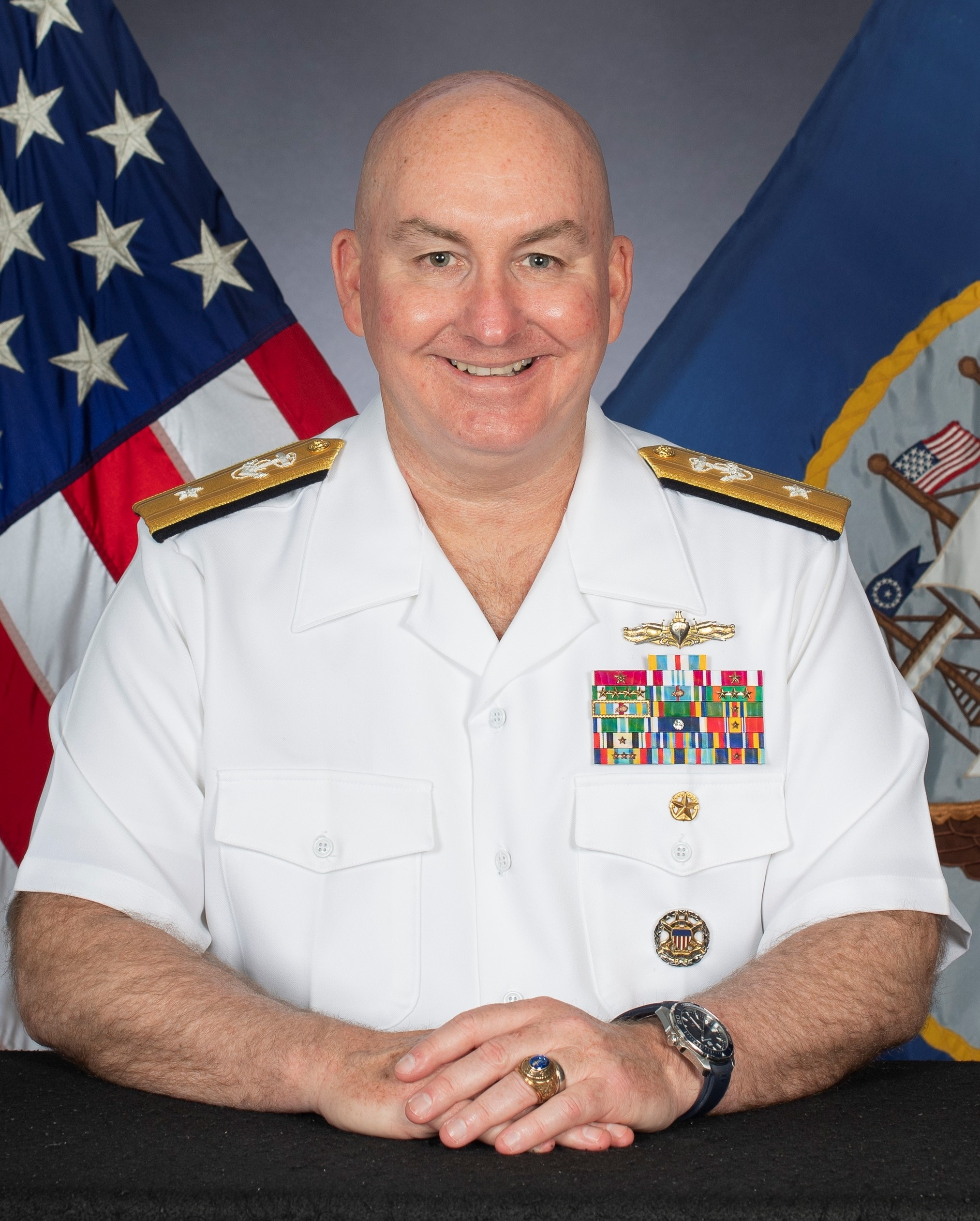
- Official CNRH/MIDPAC portrait, 2021
- Born: 1967 (age 58–59)
- Alma mater: United States Merchant Marine Academy; Naval Postgraduate School (MS); National War College (MS)
- Relatives: Cmdr. (ret) James R. Kott (father)
- Military career
- Allegiance: United States
- Branch: United States Navy
- Service years: 1990–2022
- Rank: Rear Admiral (lower half)
- Commands: Navy Region Hawaii; Carrier Strike Group 1 USS Mobile Bay (CG-53); USS Hopper (DDG-70)
- Awards: Defense Superior Service Medal; Legion of Merit (3)

Timothy Jon Kott (born 1967) is a retired United States Navy rear admiral and surface warfare officer who last served as the commander of Navy Region Hawaii from June 18, 2021 to June 17, 2022. Kott was dual-hatted as Commander, Naval Surface Group Middle Pacific from June 18, 2021 to June 3, 2022. Before that, he most recently served as commander of Carrier Strike Group 1 from June 25, 2020 to May 28, 2021, and prior to that, as assistant chief of staff for operations of Allied Joint Force Command Naples, his first flag assignment. In earlier command tours, Kott commanded USS Mobile Bay (CG-53) from March 2013 to March 2015 and USS Hopper (DDG-70) from July 2008 to March 2010.

In September 2023, Kott was one of three retired admirals who were formally reprimanded for "leadership failures" leading to fuel spills at Red Hill Underground Fuel Storage Facility in 2021.

== Early life and education ==
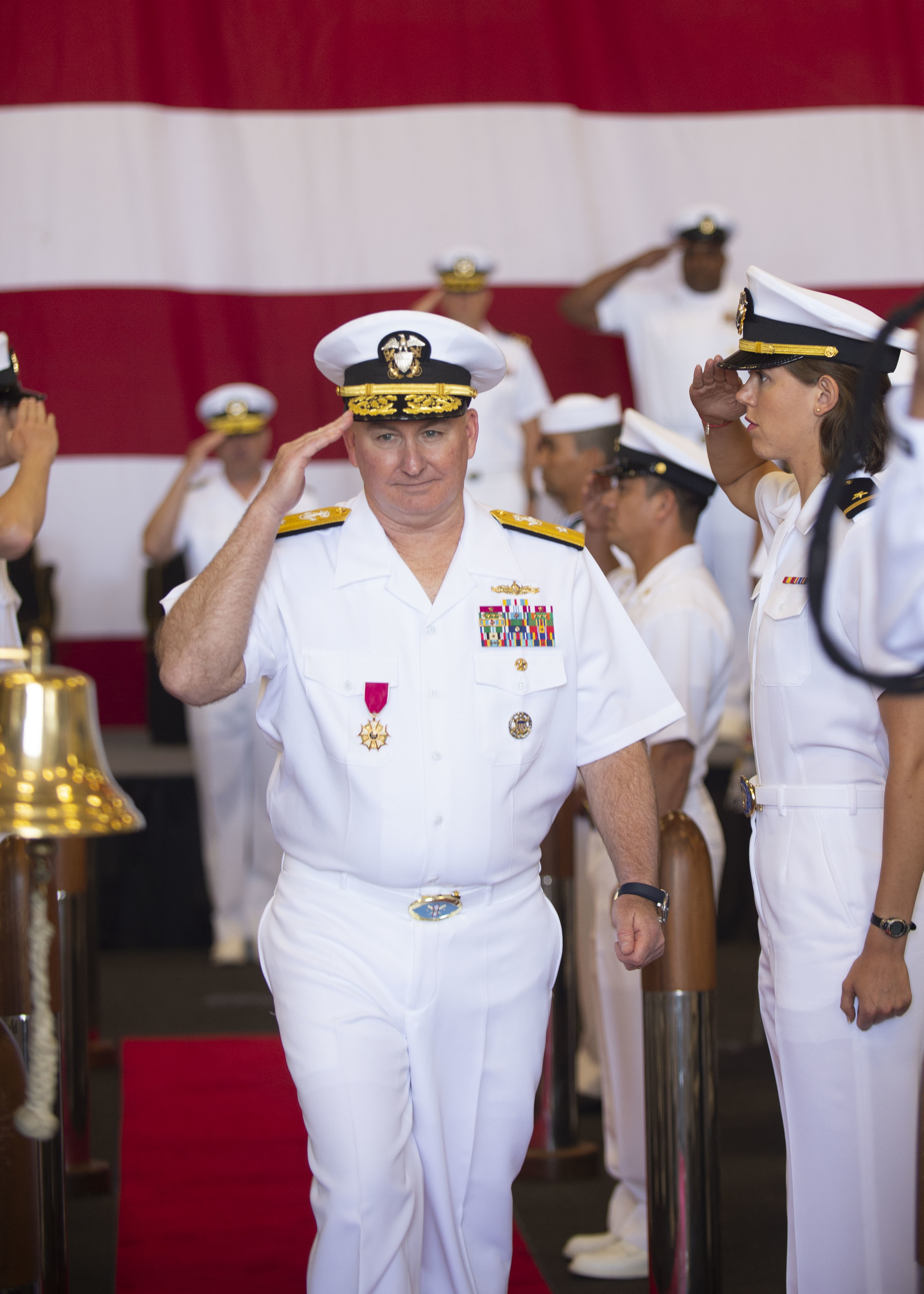
Sailors render honors to Rear Adm. Timothy Kott during a change of command ceremony for Carrier Strike Group 1, May 28, 2021.

Kott is a native of Newport, Rhode Island. He was born to Cmdr. (ret) James "Jim" R. Kott (died 2017) and H. Irene Kott with 3 siblings. He received his commission from the United States Merchant Marine Academy in 1990. He received a master's degree in Management (Financial Management) from the Naval Postgraduate School and a master's degree in National Security Strategy from the National War College.

== Awards and decorations ==

Surface Warfare Officer Pin
Defense Superior Service Medal
Legion of Merit with two award stars	Defense Meritorious Service Medal	Meritorious Service Medal with award star
Navy and Marine Corps Commendation Medal with four award stars	Joint Service Achievement Medal with bronze oak leaf cluster	Navy and Marine Corps Achievement Medal
Joint Meritorious Unit Award	Navy Unit Commendation	Navy Meritorious Unit Commendation
Coast Guard Meritorious Unit Commendation	Navy "E" Ribbon, 4th award	National Defense Service Medal with bronze service star
Iraq Campaign Medal with bronze service star	Global War on Terrorism Expeditionary Medal	Global War on Terrorism Service Medal
Navy Sea Service Deployment Ribbon with three bronze service stars	Navy Reserve Sea Service Deployment Ribbon	Navy Overseas Service Ribbon with bronze service star
Command at Sea insignia
Office of the Joint Chiefs of Staff Identification Badge

Military offices
Preceded by Jeffrey W. James	Commanding Officer of USS Hopper (DDG-70); 2008–2010	Succeeded by Kevin A. Melody
Preceded by Thomas G. Halvorson	Commanding Officer of USS Mobile Bay (CG-53); 2013–2015	Succeeded by Sean G. McLaren
Preceded by Murray Tynch III	Assistant Chief of Staff for Operations of Allied Joint Force Command Naples; 2018–2020	Succeeded by Christophe Berthier
Preceded by Alvin Holsey	Commander of Carrier Strike Group 1; 2020–2021	Succeeded by Daniel P. Martin
Preceded by Robert Chadwick II	Commander of Navy Region Hawaii; 2021–2022	Succeeded by Stephen D. Barnett
