= Joseph Prueher =

US Navy admiral and diplomat

Joseph W. Prueher
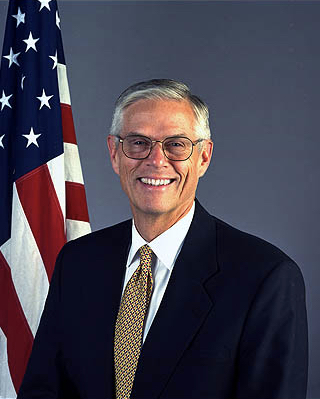
- Official portrait, 1999

7th United States Ambassador to China
- In office November 16, 1999 – May 1, 2001
- President: Bill Clinton; George W. Bush
- Preceded by: Jim Sasser
- Succeeded by: Clark T. Randt Jr.

Personal details
- Born: November 25, 1942 (age 83) Nashville, Tennessee, U.S.
- Education: United States Naval Academy

Military service
- Allegiance: United States
- Branch/service: United States Navy
- Years of service: 1964–1999
- Rank: Admiral
- Commands: United States Pacific Command; Vice Chief of Naval Operations
- Battles/wars: Vietnam War
- Awards: Defense Distinguished Service Medal; Navy Distinguished Service Medal; Legion of Merit (5); Distinguished Flying Cross (2)

Joseph Wilson Prueher (born November 25, 1942) is a retired admiral of the United States Navy who was the United States ambassador to the People's Republic of China from 1999 to 2001. He was succeeded as ambassador by Clark T. Randt Jr.

== Early life ==
Prueher was a native of Tennessee, where he was born in 1942. He attended Montgomery Bell Academy in Nashville and graduated from the U.S. Naval Academy. He also obtained a master's degree in international affairs from George Washington University's Elliott School of International Affairs.

== Career ==
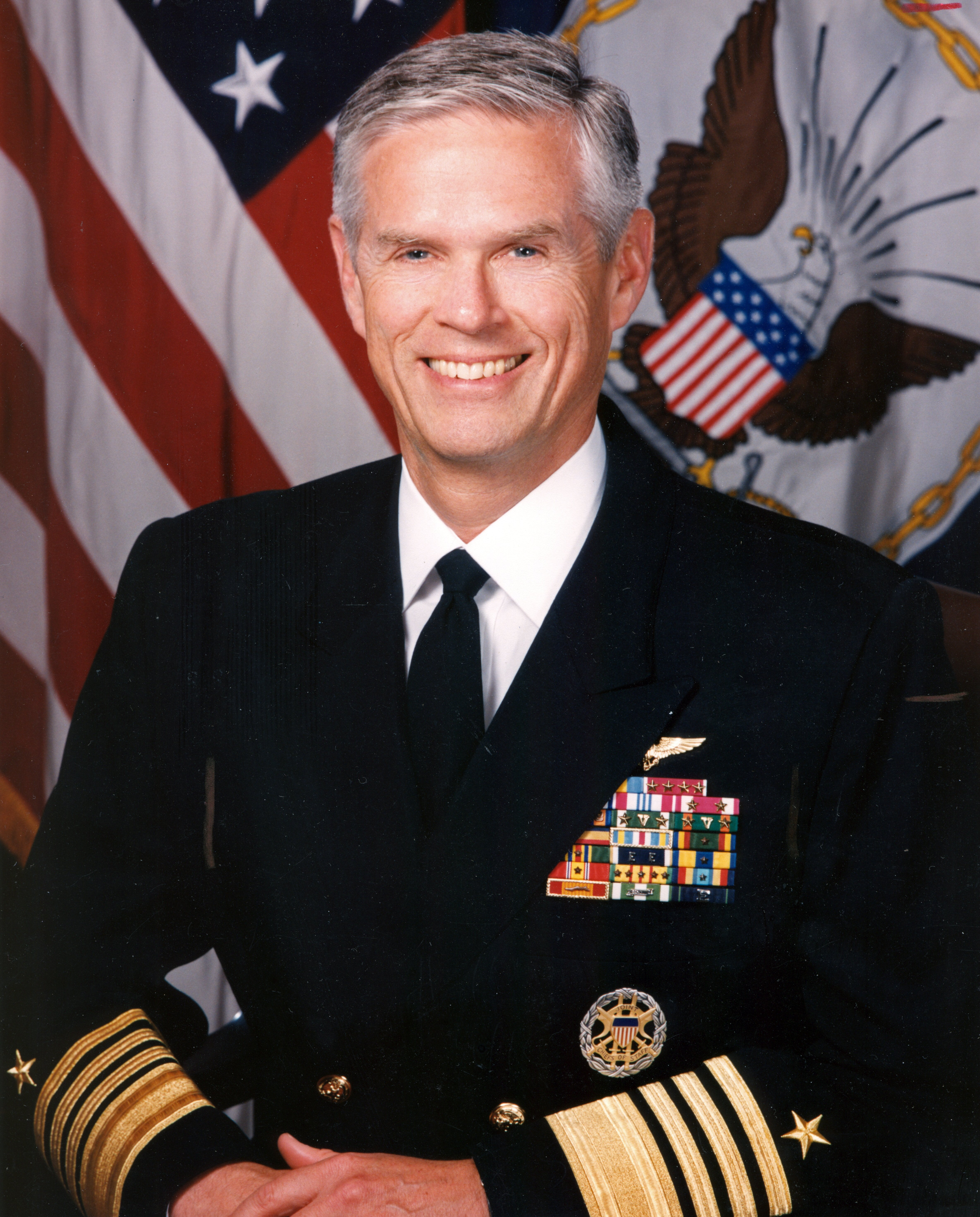
Photo taken during Prueher's time in the Navy

Prueher started his career in the United States Navy as a midshipman at the U.S. Naval Academy in 1960. He flew an A-6 Intruder in the Vietnam War. In the latter part of his career, he was the seventy-third commandant of midshipmen at the U.S. Naval Academy.

Prueher attained the rank of admiral of Commander Carrier Group One in 1991. He was appointed commander of the U.S. Sixth Fleet from 1993 to 1995. He was vice chief of Naval Operations from 1995 to 1996, and commander-in-chief of the United States Pacific Command from 1996 to 1999.

Prueher was posted as ambassador to China from November 1999 to May 2001. He negotiated the settlement and delivered the "letter of the two sorries," which defused the Hainan Island incident in 2001.

He joined Stanford University's Institute of International Studies as consulting professor in 2001.

Prueher is currently the James R. Schlesinger Distinguished Professor at the Miller Center of the University of Virginia, as well as senior advisor to the Stanford-Harvard Preventive Defense Project, working on dialogue for US-China security matters.

== Awards and decorations ==

Naval Aviator Badge
Defense Distinguished Service Medal
Navy Distinguished Service Medal	Legion of Merit with four gold award stars	Distinguished Flying Cross with award star
Defense Meritorious Service Medal	Meritorious Service Medal with two award stars	Air Medal with Combat V, gold award numeral 3 and bronze strike/flight numeral 8
Navy and Marine Corps Commendation Medal with Combat V and two award stars	Navy and Marine Corps Achievement Medal with Combat V and two award stars	Navy Presidential Unit Citation
Joint Meritorious Unit Award	Navy Unit Commendation with one bronze service star	Navy Meritorious Unit Commendation with service star
Navy E Ribbon with two Battle E's	Navy Expeditionary Medal with service star	National Defense Service Medal with service star
Vietnam Service Medal with five service stars	Navy Sea Service Deployment Ribbon with service star	Order of Australia, Honorary Officer (Military Division)
Vietnam Gallantry Cross Unit Citation	Vietnam Campaign Medal	Navy Expert Pistol Shot Medal
Joint Chiefs of Staff Identification Badge

In December 1998, Prueher was appointed an honorary Officer of the Order of Australia "for distinguished service in the promotion of Australian and United States of America Defence relations".

In 1997, he was honored with the Naval War College Distinguished Graduate Leadership Award and, in 2001, the Distinguished Alumni Achievement Award by George Washington University.

== Post-government career ==
Prueher is a director of Fluor Corporation, Irving, Texas; Emerson Electric Co., St. Louis, Missouri; and AMERIGROUP Corporation, Virginia Beach, Virginia.

Military offices
Preceded by Howard W. Habermeyer Jr.	Commandant of Midshipmen; 73rd	Succeeded by Michael D. Haskins
Preceded by Richard C. Macke	Commander, United States Pacific Command; 1996–1999	Succeeded by Dennis C. Blair
Diplomatic posts
Preceded by Jim Sasser	US Ambassador to China; 1999–2001	Succeeded by Clark T. Randt, Jr.
