= Sheldon H. Kinney =

American Navy rear admiral and academic administrator

Sheldon Hoard Kinney (1918 – 11 December 2004) was a U.S. Navy rear admiral who was prominent for action in World War II, the Korean War, Vietnam and later maritime education as Commandant of Midshipmen at the U.S. Naval Academy, President of SUNY Maritime College and as the founder and President of the UN World Maritime University.

== Biography ==
Sheldon Kinney was born in Pasadena, California, where he took to sailing from his youth. His son Bruce notes that "as a 16-year-old, he was a crew member on the sailing schooner Puritan to Hawaii." Kinney never graduated High School, and in 1935 enlisted in the Navy. As a seaman, Kinney served aboard the USS Omaha and then as a signalman aboard the USS New York.

Kinney was selected from the fleet to attend the U.S. Naval Academy in 1937. There, he received a bachelor's degree in marine engineering in February 1941 and immediately went on sea duty due to preparations for American involvement in World War II. When he graduated, he was given the Class of 1897 Sword in recognition of his scholarship and leadership in the Brigade of Midshipmen.

Kinney received Master's degrees in international economics and international politics as well as a Juris doctor from George Washington University. He also graduated in 1960 from the Naval War College. After commissioning as an officer, he served aboard the USS Sturtevant on North Atlantic convoy duty. His ship survived being rammed. Kinney received the "Navy and Marine Corps Medal for Heroism for diving from his ship in submarine infested waters to rescue two downed aviators. Later, the Sturtevant was sunk, and he survived by floating on a bag of coffee beans."

In 1943, Kinney took command of the USS Edsall and became the youngest commanding officer of a destroyer-type ship. After this, he commanded the Bronstein and was credited for sinking three German U-boats and disabling a fourth. For this he was given the Navy Cross, the Legion of Merit and the Bronstein a Presidential Unit Citation. Adm. Robert Carney, chief of naval operations from 1953 to 1955, described the Bronstein's fight that night as "the most concentrated and successful antisubmarine action by a U.S. Navy ship during World War II."

For the rest of WW II, Kinney served as the Anti-Submarine Warfare Officer on the staff of the Commander Destroyers Atlantic. He then commanded the USS Ludlow and the USS Taylor during the Korean War. He also commanded the USS Mitscher, which has the distinction of being the Navy's first guided missile frigate. He also served on the staff of the Commander of U.S. Naval Forces in Europe.

During the Vietnam War, he commanded the USS Mississinewa, Amphibious Squadron 12, and then the naval gunfire support ships of Cruiser Destroyer Flotilla 11 in Operation Sea Dragon in Vietnam. His final command was as Commander Cruiser Destroyer Forces Pacific COMCRUDESPAC.

From 1963 to 1967 he was Commandant of Midshipmen of the U.S. Naval Academy. In 1972 after 38 years of Naval Service he retired and became president of the SUNY Maritime College. He remained in the position until 1982 when he permanently retired. In retirement, he help to found and preside over the World Maritime University of the International Maritime Organization of the United Nations at Malmo, Sweden. He also served as special adviser to the secretary general of the IMO in London. His other military decorations include the Legion of Merit (Combat V) with two Gold Stars, the Bronze Star (Combat V) and the Navy Commendation Medal. The Soviet Union awarded him the Order of the Patriotic War First Class and the Polish Government in Exile awarded him the Gold Cross of Merit for saving the Polish Treasury. RADM Kinney died of cancer in Annapolis, Maryland on December 11, 2004.

== Sources ==
- Adm. Sheldon Kinney; Veteran of 3 Wars. Washington Post - Saturday, January 8, 2005; Page B06
- Sheldon H. Kinney, 86, Dies; Commanded Ships in 3 Wars. New York Times.
- http://www.legacy.com/Obituaries.asp?Page=LifeStory&PersonID=2954635
