= Steven A. Hummer =

United States Marine Corps general

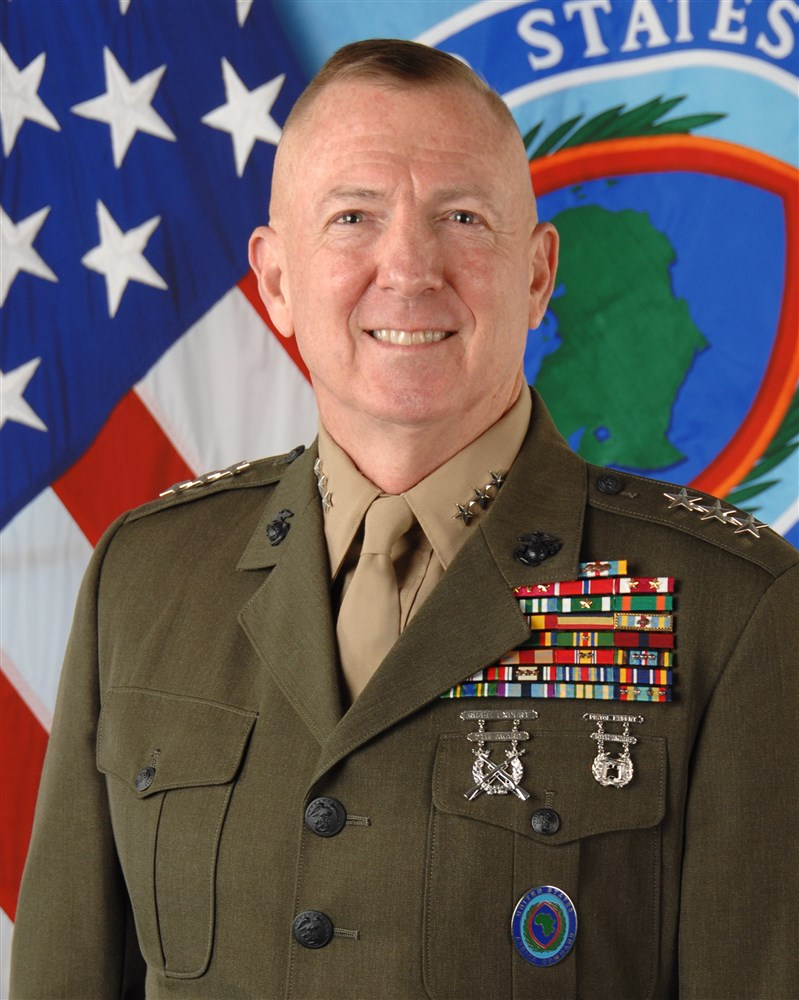
- Born: July 1, 1952 (age 74); Pennsylvania, United States
- Military career
- Allegiance: United States
- Branch: United States Marine Corps
- Service years: 1970–1973; 1977–2015
- Rank: Lieutenant General
- Commands: United States Marine Corps Forces Reserve; Marine Forces Northern Command; 7th Marine Regiment
- Conflicts: War in Afghanistan; Iraq War
- Awards: Defense Superior Service Medal (4); Legion of Merit (3); Bronze Star Medal

Steven A. Hummer (born July 1, 1952) is a retired United States Marine Corps lieutenant general who served as Deputy to the Commander for Military Operations for United States Africa Command (AFRICOM).

Hummer previously served as Commander, United States Marine Corps Forces Reserve and Marine Forces Northern Command. After enlisting in the Marine Corps in 1970 and an honorable discharge as a sergeant in 1973, he was commissioned following graduation from Albright College in Reading, Pennsylvania, in 1977. Hummer was born in Pennsylvania in 1952, the son of a Marine and Navy chaplain.

As a company grade officer, Hummer served in the operation forces with 3d Battalion, 3d Marines and 1st Battalion, 9th Marines. His assignments included Rifle Platoon Commander, Battalion Training Officer, Battalion Operations Officer and Company Commander. As a field grade officer, he served in the operating forces with 1st Marine Division, I Marine Expeditionary Force and III Marine Expeditionary Force. His assignments included Officer-In-Charge, 1st Marines Regimental Enhanced Training Section, 1st MARDIV; Operations Officer, 31st Marine Expeditionary Unit (Special Operations Capable), III MEF; Officer-In-Charge, Special Operations Training Group, III MEF; Assistant Future Plans Officer, 1st MARDIV; Commanding Officer, Battalion Landing Team 1/1 under 13th MEU (SOC) and 15th MEU (SOC); and Commanding Officer, 7th Marines, 1st MARDIV, and Director of Operations (J-3) for US Forces – Iraq, during combat operations in Operation Iraqi Freedom.

Supporting establishment duties include Registrar, Marine Corps Institute; Ceremonial Rifle Company Commander, Marine Barracks, Washington, D.C; Department Head, Naval Expeditionary Warfare Training, Expeditionary Warfare Training Group Pacific; Chief of Staff, Joint Special Operations Command, with participation in Operation Iraqi Freedom and Operation Enduring Freedom; Commanding General, Marine Corps Base Hawaii, and Deputy Commander, Marine Forces Pacific; Chief of Staff, US Special Operations Command; Assistant Deputy Commandant for Plans, Policies and Operations, Headquarters Marine Corps; and Deputy Commanding General, Marine Corps Combat Development Command.

Hummer's military education includes The Basic School, Officers Infantry Course, Amphibious Warfare School, Command and Staff College, and School of Advanced Warfighting within the Marine Corps University; and the Air War College. He also has a Bachelor of Science degree in Psycho-Biology from Albright College and a master's degree in International Security Studies from the Air War College.

Military offices
Preceded by Charles J. Leidig	Deputy to the Commander for Military Operations of the United States Africa Command; 2013–2015	Succeeded by Michael T. Franken
