= Murray Tynch III =

Retired U.S. Navy admiral

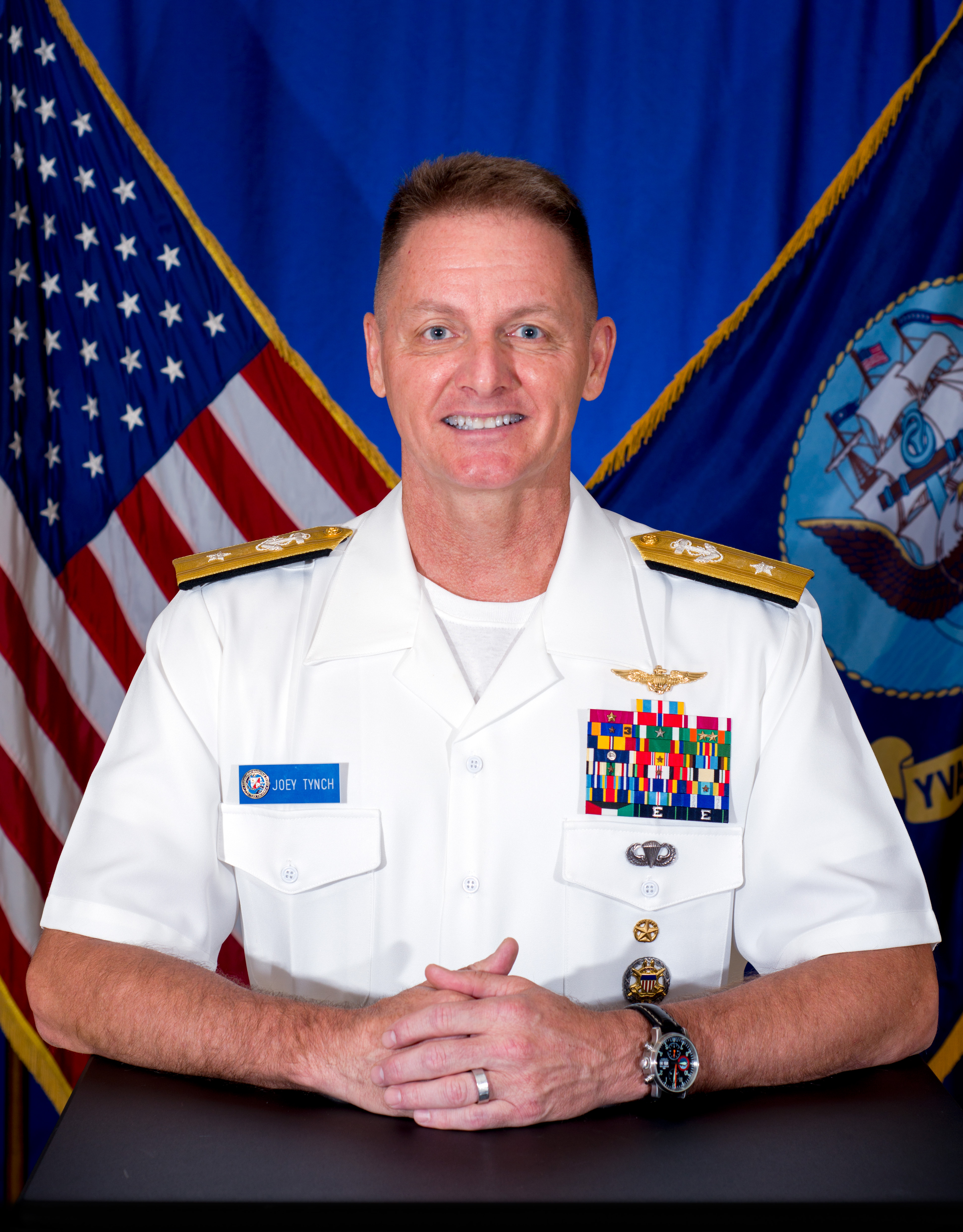
- Born: March 4, 1964 (age 62); Chowan County, North Carolina, U.S.
- Alma mater: University of North Carolina at Chapel Hill; National War College
- Military career
- Allegiance: United States
- Branch: United States Navy
- Service years: 1988–2021
- Rank: Rear Admiral (lower half)
- Nicknames: Joey; JT
- Commands: Task Force 73/Commander, Logistics Group Western Pacific; USS Bonhomme Richard (LHD-6); Provincial Reconstruction Team, Kunar Province; HS-8
- Awards: Defense Superior Service Medal; Legion of Merit (2); Bronze Star Medal

Murray Joe Tynch III (born March 4, 1964) is a retired United States Navy rear admiral and naval aviator who last served as the commander of Task Force 73 and Logistics Group Western Pacific (COMLOG WESTPAC) and dual-hatted as the Singapore Area Coordinator from June 12, 2018 to July 26, 2021. As CTF 73/CLWP, he provides the United States Seventh Fleet with combat-ready logistics and maintains and operates government-owned ships and operating government-contracted vessels to sustain combatant ships and units throughout Seventh Fleet's area of operations.

Tynch previously served as assistant chief of staff for operations of Allied Joint Force Command Naples, his first flag assignment, with tours as deputy director of the Navy Staff from July 2015 to June 2016, commanding officer of USS Bonhomme Richard (LHD-6) from October 2013 to April 2015, and executive officer of the same vessel from June 2012 to October 2015. He relieved Captain Daniel Dusek as commanding officer after a Department of Defense investigation was launched into Dusek's activities. He was also Secretary of the Joint Staff (SJS) from August 2009 to June 2012.

He relinquished command of WESTPAC and CTF-73 to Philip Sobeck in 2021 in a private ceremony due to the COVID-19 pandemic in Singapore.

== Early life and education ==
A native of North Carolina, Tynch is a graduate of the University of North Carolina at Chapel Hill and received his commission from the Aviation Officer Candidate School in July 1988. He was selected as the Naval Helicopter Association’s (NHA) Instructor Pilot of the Year in 1998 and the NHA’s Pilot of the Year in 2005.

== Personal life ==
Tynch is the son of Murray Joe Tynch Jr. and Patsy Jean (Holliday) Tynch.

Military offices
Preceded by Daniel P. Dusek	Commanding Officer of USS Bonhomme Richard (LHD-6); 2013–2015	Succeeded by Jeffrey A. Ward
Preceded by Kent D. Whalen	Assistant Chief of Staff for Operations of Allied Joint Force Command Naples; 2016–2018	Succeeded by Timothy J. Kott
Preceded by Donald D. Gabrielson	Commander of Task Force 73 and Logistics Group Western Pacific; 2018–2021	Succeeded by Philip E. Sobeck
