= Richard C. Macke =

United States admiral (1938–2022)

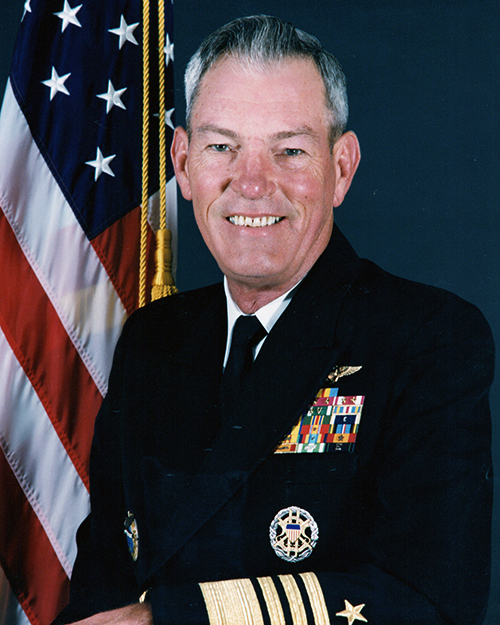
- Admiral Richard C. Macke
- Born: January 4, 1938; Freeport, Illinois, U.S.
- Died: December 7, 2022 (aged 84); Honolulu, Hawaii, U.S.
- Military career
- Allegiance: United States
- Branch: United States Navy
- Service years: 1960–1996
- Rank: Admiral (retired as Rear Admiral)
- Commands: United States Pacific Command; Carrier Strike Group Four; Carrier Group Two; Naval Space Command; USS Dwight D. Eisenhower; USS Camden; VA-66
- Conflicts: Vietnam War
- Awards: Defense Distinguished Service Medal; Defense Superior Service Medal; Legion of Merit (4)

Richard Chester Macke (January 4, 1938 – December 7, 2022) was a naval aviator and a former admiral in the United States Navy. He last served as Commander of United States Pacific Command (USPACOM) from July 19, 1994, until January 31, 1996. After his navy career, Macke served as a vice president of Wheat International Communications Corporation.

== Naval career ==
Macke graduated from the United States Naval Academy with a Bachelor of Science degree in 1960. After graduation, he reported to flight training at NAS Pensacola, Florida. After training at several other air stations, he was designated a Naval Aviator in August 1961. He then reported to Attack Squadron 23 (VA-23) at NAS Lemoore, California and flew A-4 Skyhawks from the aircraft carrier USS Midway.

In 1965, Macke was selected for Test Pilot Training and entered the United States Navy Test Pilot School at NAS Patuxent River, Maryland. Following graduation, he served in the Weapons System Test Directorate of the Naval Air Test Center, participating in the initial trials of the A-7A Corsair II aircraft. He next went to VA-27, flying A-7s and completing more than 150 combat missions in Southeast Asia from the aircraft carrier USS Constellation.

Macke reported to the United States Naval Postgraduate School in February 1970, where he graduated with distinction with a Master of Science degree in operations research and systems analysis. In March 1971, he reported to VA-66 at NAS Cecil Field, Florida as Executive Officer and later as Commanding Officer of that attack squadron, flying the A-7E Corsair II from the aircraft carrier USS Independence.

In January 1975, Macke was assigned to the Navy Office of Legislative Affairs in the Pentagon, where he was involved in presenting the Naval Aviation Program budget to members of Congress and their staffs. Following completion of Nuclear Propulsion Training, Admiral Macke served as Executive Officer of the aircraft carrier USS Nimitz, where he participated in the attempted rescue of American hostages in Iran. Completing that tour, he was selected for major ship command and commanded the fast combat support ship USS Camden.

Macke served a short tour as the Executive Assistant to the Navy Director of Command and Control in the Pentagon prior to reporting to the nuclear-powered aircraft carrier USS Dwight D. Eisenhower as Commanding Officer on July 6, 1984. During his tour on the Dwight D. Eisenhower, the ship was awarded the Battle "E" as the most combat-ready aircraft carrier on the East Coast of the United States. Macke relinquished command on October 18, 1986.

Macke was selected for flag rank and reported as the commander of the Naval Space Command, where he led initiatives to enhance space support to tactical warriors. Next, he reported as the commander of Carrier Group Two in March 1988 and in January 1990 was selected for sequential command and became commander of Carrier Group Four. Macke was then nominated by President George H. W. Bush to serve in the grade of vice admiral as the Director for Command, Control, Communications and Computer (C4) System (J6) on the Joint Staff in the Pentagon. In December 1992, General Colin Powell chose Macke to serve as the Director of the Joint Staff.

Macke was nominated and confirmed for the four-star grade of admiral and left the Joint Staff to become the Commander in Chief, United States Pacific Command in July 1994.

=== 1995 Okinawan rape incident ===
Macke was relieved of his post at the Pacific Command in November 1995, only hours after making the following comment to reporters about the case of three United States serviceman eventually convicted of kidnapping, beating, and raping a 12-year-old Japanese girl: "I think it was absolutely stupid. I have said several times: for the price they paid to rent the car [used in the crime], they could have had a girl."

Macke retired from the Navy on 1 April 1996 as a two-star rear admiral, two stars lower than the rank he previously held. Later that year, he was censured by the Navy for matters related to an extramarital affair he had before his retirement with an unidentified female Marine Corps lieutenant colonel.

=== Involvement in Greeneville incident ===
Macke was responsible for arranging the presence of civilians on board the submarine USS Greeneville prior to its 2001 collision with the Japanese boat Ehime Maru, which was carrying high school students. At the request of Macke, a civilian was at the helm of the submarine when the incident occurred. Nine Japanese civilians aboard the Ehime Maru were killed. Macke refused to testify at the court of inquiry of Commander Scott Waddle, the commanding officer of the USS Greeneville at the time of the incident.

== Awards and decorations ==

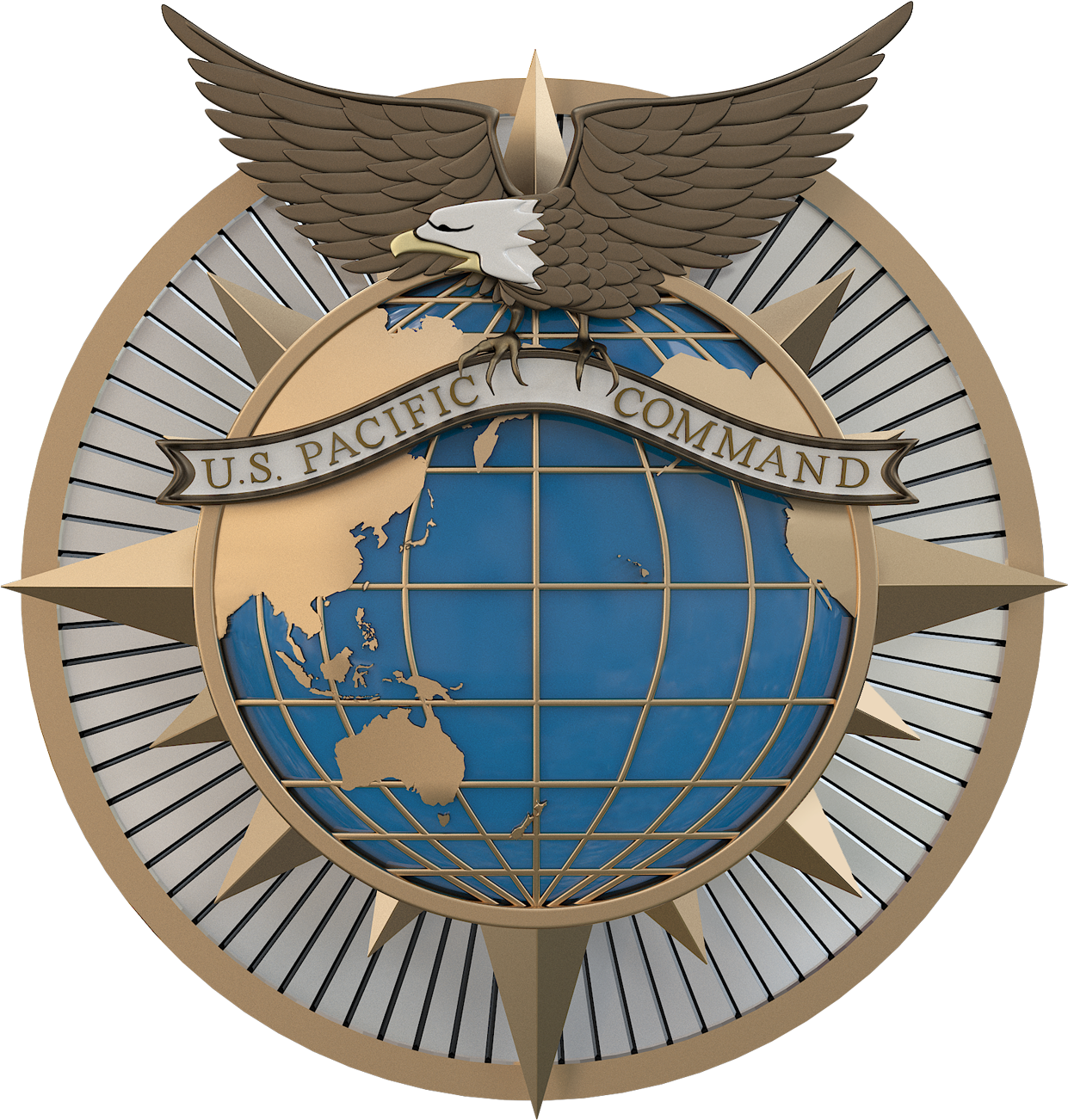

Naval Aviator Badge
Defense Distinguished Service Medal
Defense Superior Service Medal	Legion of Merit with three gold award stars	Meritorious Service Medal with two award stars
Air Medal with award star and bronze strike/flight numeral 14	Navy and Marine Corps Commendation Medal with Combat V and award star	Joint Meritorious Unit Award
Navy Unit Commendation	Navy Meritorious Unit Commendation	Navy E Ribbon
Navy Expeditionary Medal	National Defense Service Medal with service star	Armed Forces Expeditionary Medal
Vietnam Service Medal with three service stars	Navy Sea Service Deployment Ribbon with silver service star	Vietnam Gallantry Cross with bronze star
Vietnam Gallantry Cross Unit Citation	Vietnam Campaign Medal	Navy Expert Pistol Shot Medal
Joint Chiefs of Staff Identification Badge
United States Pacific Command Badge

Military offices
Preceded by Harold T. Fields (acting)	Commander, United States Pacific Command; 1994–1996	Succeeded by Joseph Prueher
