= Daniel P. Martin =

U.S. Navy admiral

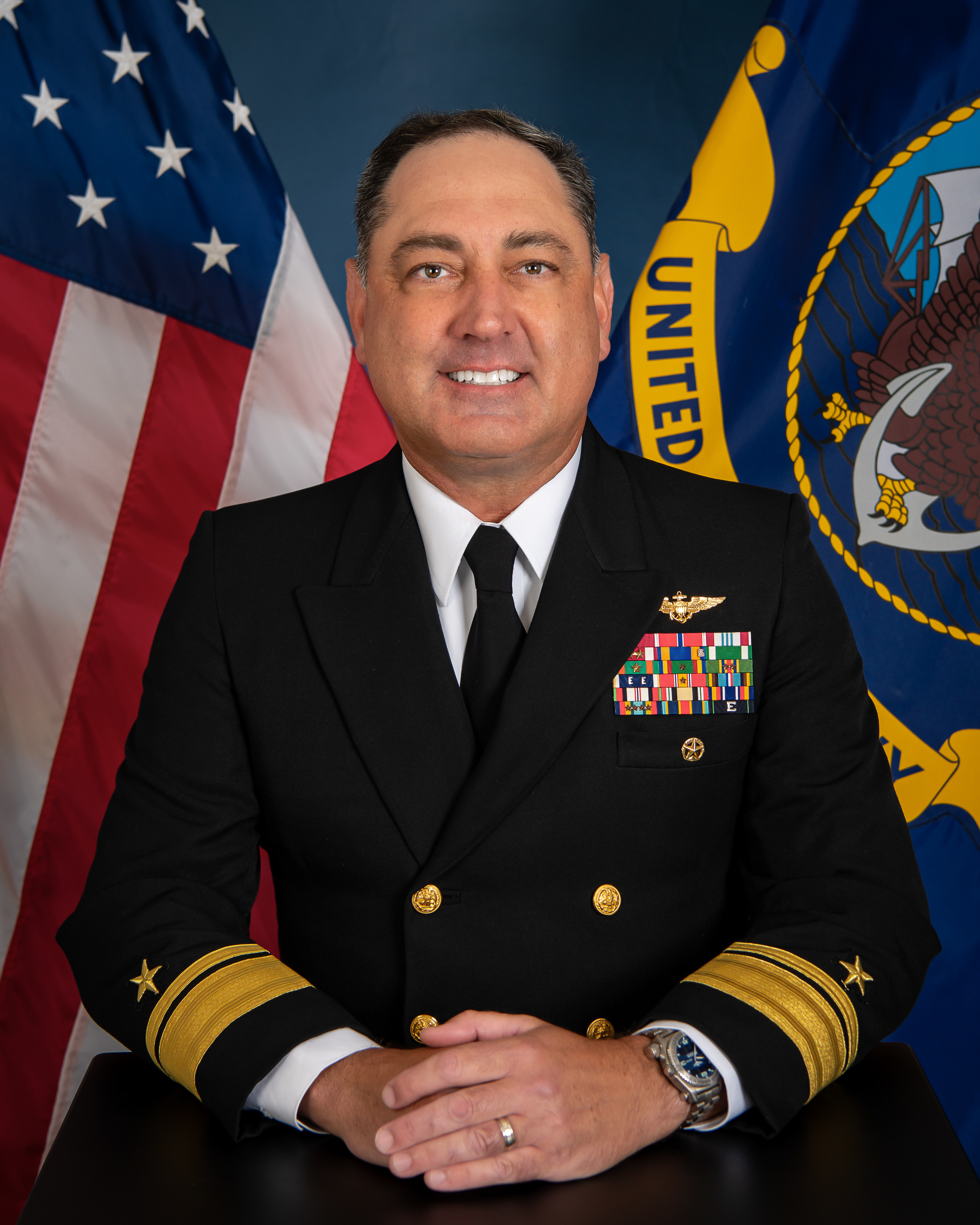
- Education: Oglethorpe University (BBA); Joint Forces Staff College; United States Naval War College (MA)
- Military career
- Allegiance: United States
- Branch: United States Navy
- Service years: 1991–present
- Rank: Rear Admiral
- Commands: Naval Safety Command; Carrier Strike Group 1 Carrier Air Wing 8 VFA-37
- Awards: Legion of Merit; Bronze Star Medal

Daniel P. Martin is a United States Navy rear admiral and naval aviator who has served as the commander of Naval Safety Command since July 1, 2024. He most recently served as the director of maritime operations of the United States Pacific Fleet from 2022 to 2024. He served as the commander of Carrier Strike Group 1 from 2021 to 2022. He previously served as senior military assistant to the Assistant Secretary of State for Political-Military Affairs. In earlier command tours, he commanded Carrier Air Wing 8 from June 2015 to 2016 and Strike Fighter Squadron 37 from 2010 to 2011.

A 1991 graduate of Oglethorpe University, Martin received his commission from Georgia Tech's NROTC program. He earned his Joint Qualified Officer (JQO) designation at the Joint Forces Staff College and a Master of Arts in International Security Affairs from the Naval War College.

Operationally, he has served in numerous strike fighter squadrons flying the FA-18 Hornet. His fleet assignments include a junior officer tour with the Dambusters of VFA-195, forward deployed in Atsugi, Japan and a department head tour with the Wildcats of VFA-131. RDML Martin was the commanding officer of the Bulls of VFA-37. Post deployment, the Bulls earned the 2010 CNAF Battle ‘E’ and the CAPT Michael J. Estocin Award, the Top Hook Award for cruise and the 2010 Retention Excellence Award. He was the air wing commander (CAG) at Carrier Air Wing EIGHT in 2015-2016. Following deployment, CVW-8 and CVN 77 won the “Jig Dog” Ramage Award, which recognizes the air wing – aircraft carrier team with the best performance as an integrated unit and excellence in Navy carrier operations.

Ashore, RDML Martin served as an FA-18 instructor pilot and Landing Signal Officer (LSO) with the Gladiators of VFA-106 and as a demonstration pilot with the US Navy Flight Demonstration Squadron, the Blue Angels. He served as the narrator (#7), the opposing solo (#6), and the lead solo and operations officer (#5) for the 2001 through 2003 show seasons. RDML Martin has held four staff officer assignments: a joint / international assignment to Headquarters, Supreme Allied Command Transformation, congressional liaison for all naval aviation programs at the Navy’s Office for Legislative Affairs in Washington, DC, and Executive Assistant to the Deputy Chief of Naval Operations for Operations, Plans, and Strategy (OPNAV N3/N5) in the Pentagon. Most recently, he served as the Executive Assistant to the Commander, US Fleet Forces Command in Norfolk, VA.

He is entitled to wear the Legion of Merit, the Bronze Star, the Defense Meritorious Service Medal, Meritorious Service Medal, Air Medal and various unit and campaign awards. RDML Martin has accumulated over 4,600 flight hours and 750 carrier-arrested landings.

In February 2023, he was nominated for promotion to rear admiral; in March 2024, he was assigned as the commander of Naval Safety Command.

Military offices
Preceded by Daniel Cheever	Commander of Carrier Air Wing 8; 2015–2016	Succeeded by James A. McCall III
Preceded by Yvette M. Davids	Senior Military Assistant to the Assistant Secretary of State for Political-Military Affairs; 2020–2021	Succeeded by Joseph D. McFall
Preceded by Timothy J. Kott	Commander of Carrier Strike Group 1; 2021–2022	Succeeded by Carlos A. Sardiello
Preceded by Michael E. Boyle	Director of Maritime Operations of the United States Pacific Fleet; 2022–2024	Succeeded by Erik J. Eslich
Preceded by Christopher M. Engdahl	Commander of Naval Safety Command; 2024–present	Incumbent
