= Clark Randt =

American lawyer and diplomat

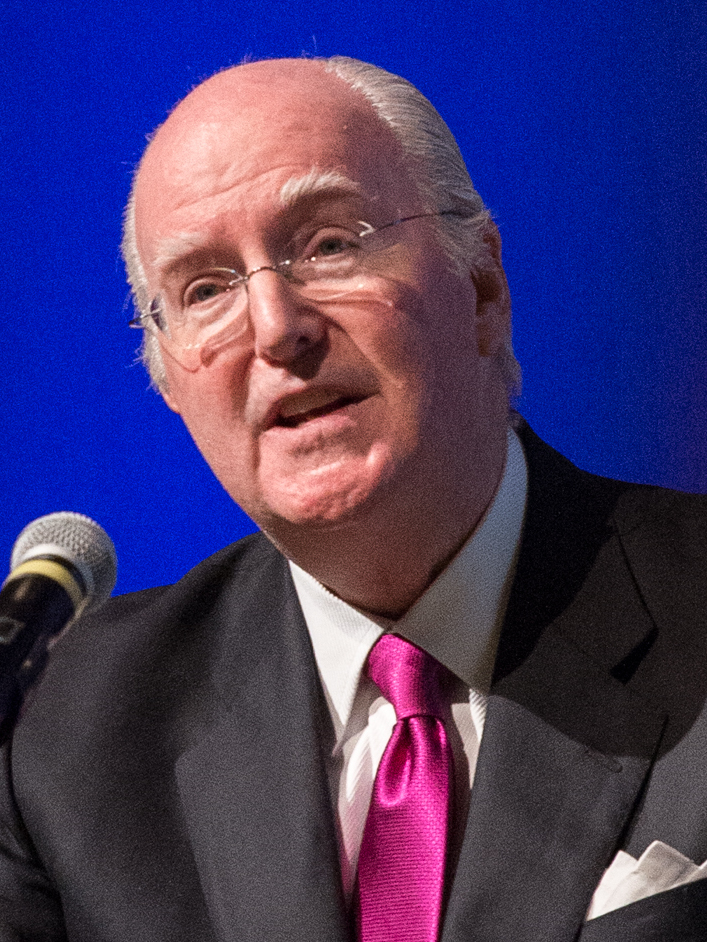
- Randt in 2015

8th United States Ambassador to China
- In office July 28, 2001 – January 20, 2009
- President: George W. Bush
- Preceded by: Joseph Prueher
- Succeeded by: Jon Huntsman Jr.

Personal details
- Born: Clark Thorp Randt Jr. November 24, 1945 (age 80) Connecticut, U.S.
- Party: Republican
- Spouse: Sarah Talcott
- Children: 3
- Education: Yale University; University of Michigan Law School
- Profession: Lawyer

Clark Thorp "Sandy" Randt Jr. (Note: Chinese: 雷德; pinyin: Léi Dé) (born November 24, 1945) is an American lawyer and diplomat who served as the United States Ambassador to the People's Republic of China from July 28, 2001 to January 20, 2009, making him the longest-serving U.S. Ambassador to China. Randt was formerly a partner with the law firm of Shearman & Sterling in Hong Kong, where he headed the firm's China practice.

== Education ==
After preparing at The Hotchkiss School, Randt graduated from Yale University with a Bachelor of Arts in 1968 and received his Juris Doctor from the University of Michigan Law School in 1975. He also attended Harvard Law School where he was awarded the East Asia Legal Studies Traveling Fellowship to China. While at Yale, he was a member of Delta Kappa Epsilon fraternity with George W. Bush.

== Career ==
From 1968 to 1972, Randt served in the United States Air Force Security Service, and in 1974 he was the China representative of the National Council for United States-China Trade.

From 1982 through 1984, Randt served as First Secretary and Commercial Attaché at the U.S. Embassy in Beijing. He then lived in Hong Kong for 18 years, most recently as a partner with the international law firm of Shearman & Sterling, heading the firm's China office and focusing on capital markets and foreign direct investment. Randt was Governor and First Vice President of the American Chamber of Commerce in Hong Kong. He is a member of the New York and Hong Kong bars and is a recognized expert on Chinese law. He is fluent in Mandarin Chinese.

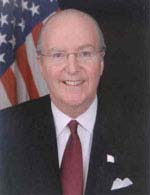
Official portrait from tenure as ambassador

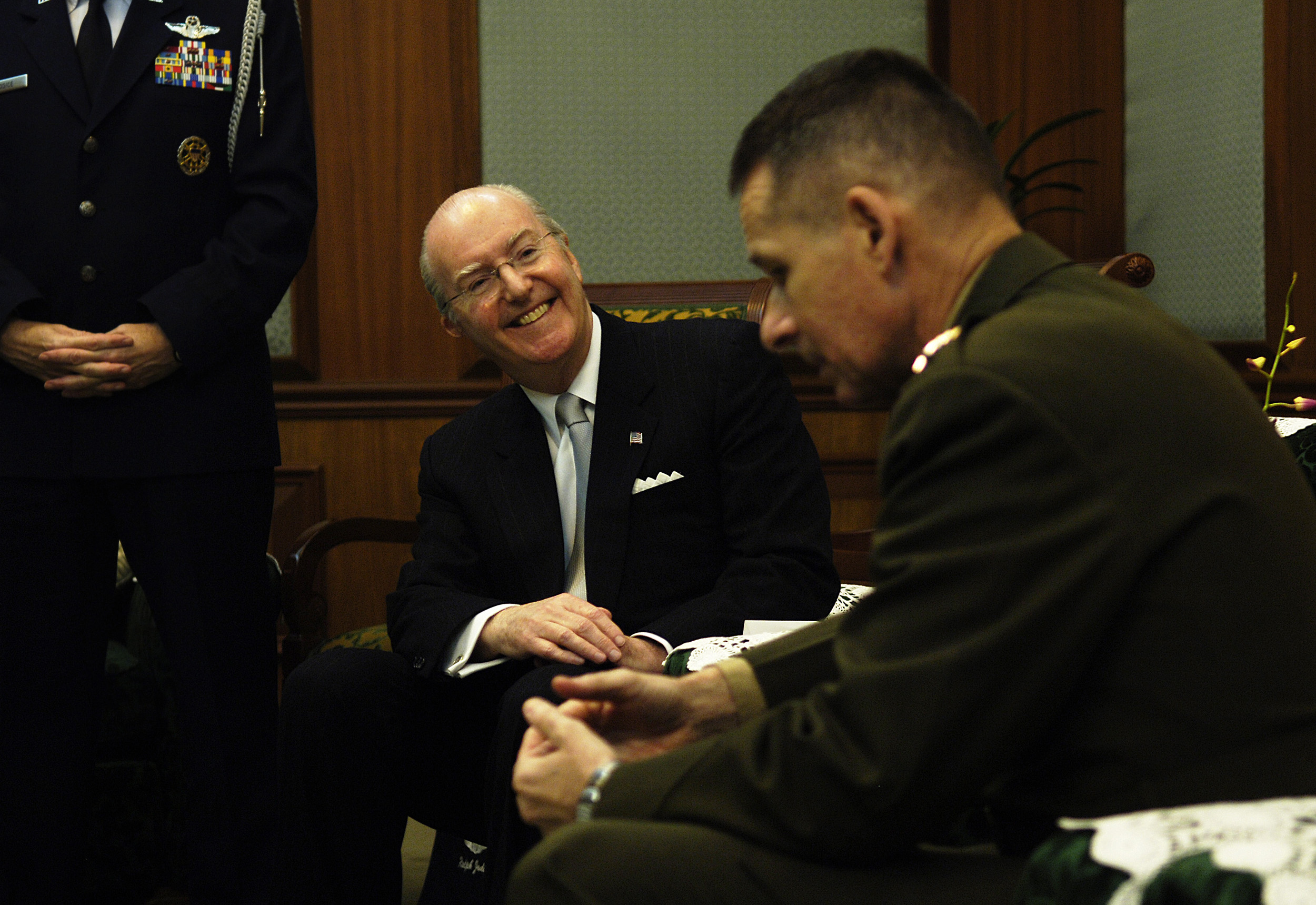
Randt (left) speaks with Chairman of the Joint Chiefs of Staff Peter Pace prior to a meeting with foreign minister of China Li Zhaoxing in Beijing, China on March 23, 2007

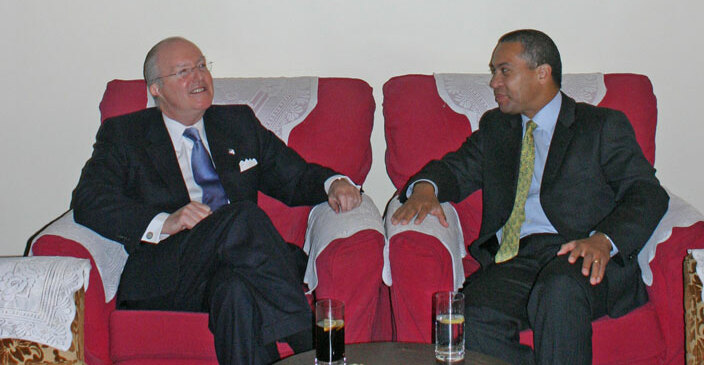
Randt meeting with Massachusetts Governor Deval Patrick during a December 2007 trade mission by Patrick to China

Randt was nominated U.S. Ambassador to China by President George W. Bush on April 30, 2001 and confirmed by the U.S. Senate on July 11, 2001. He was sworn in as U.S. Ambassador to China on July 17, 2001 and arrived in Beijing on July 23.

Randt has been an opponent to the sale of defensive weapons to the Republic of China (Taiwan) in the face of opposition from the Communist government in Beijing.

As a political appointee, Randt was required by convention to resign at the end of Bush's term. The Deputy Chief of Mission took over as chargé d'affaires at the U.S. embassy for several months before Barack Obama's appointment of Jon Huntsman. Randt is currently a special advisor to Hopu Investment Management, a Chinese private equity fund.

== Personal life ==
Randt is married and has three children.

== Notes ==
Diplomatic posts
Preceded by Joseph Prueher	U.S. Ambassador to China; 2001–2009	Succeeded by Jon Huntsman
