= Naval Safety Command =

Echelon II command of the United States Navy

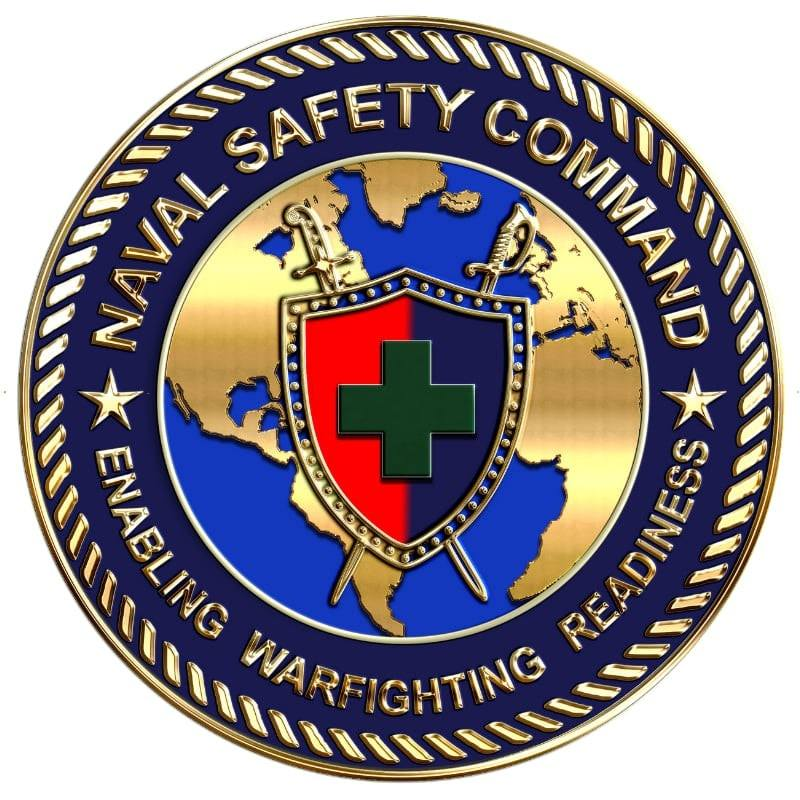
- Naval Safety Command emblem
- Founded: 4 February 2022 (3 years, 2 months) as Naval Safety Command 1 December 1951 (73 years, 4 months) as U.S. Naval Aviation Safety Activity
- Country: United States
- Branch: United States Navy
- Type: Echelon II command
- Role: Enhancement of Navy safety posture
- Headquarters: Naval Station Norfolk, Norfolk, Virginia, U.S.
- Website: navalsafetycommand.navy.mil

Commanders
- Commander: RADM Daniel P. Martin
- Deputy Commander: Col Hugh L. Atkinson, USMC
- Executive Director: Mr. Christopher Tarsa, USN, Retired
- Command Master Chief: CMDCM (AW/SW) Dean Sonnenberg

Insignia
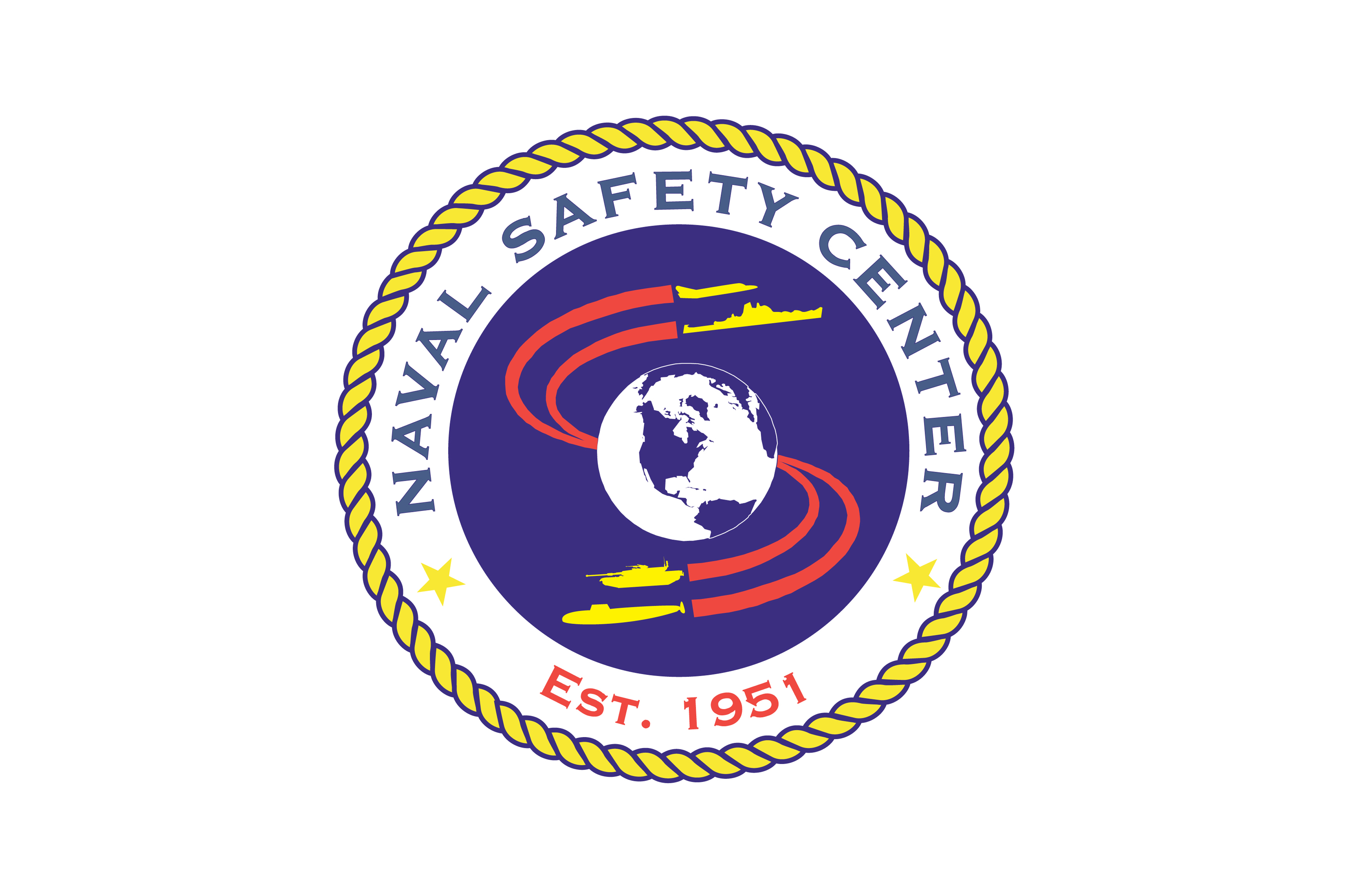
- NAVSAFECEN flag (1968–2022)

The Naval Safety Command (NAVSAFECOM) is an echelon II command of the U.S. Navy, established in its current form on 4 February 2022.

In May 1968, the Naval Aviation Safety Center and the Submarine Safety Center, located in New London, Connecticut, merged to become the Naval Safety Center (NSC). Programs involving surface ships and shore activities were added to form the nucleus for all safety programs within the Navy. In 1986, system safety was added as a program, and the position of a Marine Corps deputy commander was established to administer and represent Marine Corps safety issues.

Today, the Naval Safety Command is organized into four directorates: aviation, afloat, shore, and operational risk management/expeditionary warfare. Six departments and five special staff divisions provide support to the core operations of the command. The Naval School of Aviation Safety in Pensacola, Florida, is also a NAVSAFECEN detachment consisting of civilian and military staff, which includes Marine Corps personnel. As an Echelon II command, NAVSAFECEN provides oversight of its two Echelon III commands, the Naval Safety and Environmental Training Center in Norfolk, Virginia and the Naval Safety Center School of Aviation Safety in Naval Air Station Pensacola, Florida.

One of the NSC's subsections is Navy Occupational Safety & Health (NAVOSH). NAVOSH is responsible for safety practices within the Navy. NAVOSH provides safety assistance and advice to the CNO, CMC, and the Deputy Assistant Secretary of the Navy for Safety with the aim of enhancing the war-fighting capability of the Navy and Marine Corps, preserve resources, and improve combat readiness by preventing mishaps.

== Aviation ==
Naval aviation safety improved through the Cold War. The number of accidents causing aircraft destruction, human fatality, or total disability dropped from 38.18 per 100,000 flight hours in 1955 to 3.44 in 1985. Pilot error was a contributing factor to half of such accidents, while material failure was involved in 30 percent. Errors in maintenance and supervision accounted for the remainder, with some accidents involving multiple causes. The highest accident risk occurred among pilots with less than 300 hours flying the model of aircraft involved, and that risk dropped significantly among pilots with more than 750 hours of experience flying that model. Younger pilots were more likely to lose control through improper use of controls or failure to maintain flying speed, while older pilots were more likely to violate regulations regarding pre-flight procedures and use of flight instruments.

The highest accident risk is during carrier landings. While other military pilots typically avoid landing aboard ships, they share other high-risk activities including offensive maneuvers, formation flying, low-level navigation, and cross-country flying. Major accidents are about half as likely for United States Air Force flight operations. Aside from avoiding shipboard landings, Air Force pilots operating with Navy squadron exchange programs found pilot proficiency declined during deployments because of reduced training opportunities during the structured flight operation readiness schedules of deployed warships.
