= Stephen D. Barnett =

US Navy officer (born c. 1967)

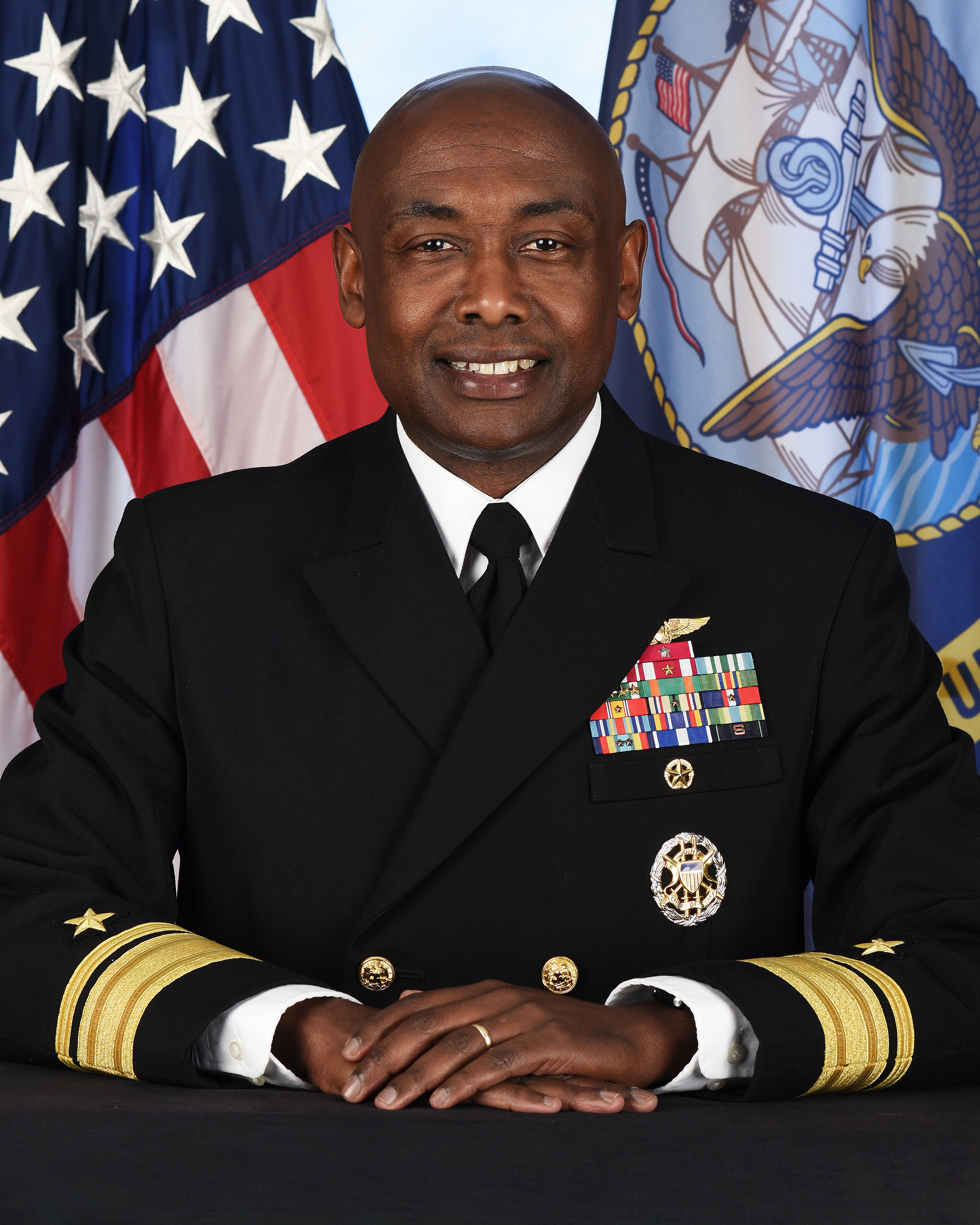
- Official portrait, 2024
- Born: c. 1967 (age 58–59)
- Alma mater: Tennessee State University (BS); Troy State University (MBA)
- Military career
- Allegiance: United States
- Branch: United States Navy
- Service years: 1990-present
- Rank: Rear admiral
- Commands: Navy Region Mid-Atlantic; Navy Region Hawaii; Navy Region Southwest; Navy Region Northwest; Naval Base Coronado; VP-47
- Conflicts: Kosovo War

Stephen D. Barnett (born c. 1967) is an active duty United States Navy officer and career naval flight officer who currently commands Navy Region Mid-Atlantic. Previously, he has served as the commander of Navy Region Hawaii from 2022 to 2025, and commander of Navy Closure Task Force – Red Hill from 2023 to 2025. He served as the commander of Navy Region Southwest from 2021 to 2022, and before that as commander, Navy Region Northwest from March to June 2021.

== Early life and education ==
Barnett is a native of Columbia, Tennessee. He is an alumnus of Tennessee State University, where he received his Bachelor of Science in mechanical engineering, and Troy State University, where he earned his Master of Business Administration. He earned his commission at Aviation Officer Candidate School in 1991.

== Military career ==
At sea, Barnett reported to Patrol Squadron (VP) 46 stationed at Naval Air Station Whidbey Island, Washington as a naval flight officer. He has also served as the operations department administration officer on board USS John C. Stennis (CVN-74), and served as a department head for VP-5 stationed at Naval Air Station Jacksonville, Florida. As commanding officer of VP-47 stationed at Kaneohe, Hawaii, he led the squadron on a simultaneous deployment to Japan and Iraq, executing more than 250 missions in support of Operation Iraqi Freedom. During his tour, the squadron completed more than 950 sorties comprising 5,000 hours.

His assignments ashore include serving as a detailer at the Bureau of Naval Personnel, directing the assignments of more than 1,000 naval aviators; naval flight officer instructor for VP-30, NAS Jacksonville; assistant Joint Requirements Oversight Council Secretariat, assisting in the evaluation and development of joint force requirements on the Joint Chiefs of Staff. Barnett served as senior program analyst for Chief of Naval Operations (OPNAV N80), he monitored naval aviation's $137 billion annual budget, and as deputy executive assistant to the Vice Chief of Naval Operations. Additional assignments include deputy director of the Resource Management Division for the Chief of Naval Operations (Manpower Personnel, Training, and Education); commanding officer of Naval Base Coronado, California, and later as chief of staff for Commander, Navy Region Southeast and Commander, Navy Installations Command. He then served as deputy commander, Navy Installations Command.

Barnett assumed duties as commander, Navy Region Northwest in March 2020 and relinquished command to Brad J. Collins in June 2021.

In March 2022, he was reassigned as commander of Navy Region Hawaii, succeeding Timothy Kott. He relinquished command of Navy Region Southwest to Rear Admiral Bradley N. Rosen on May 23, 2022.

In February 2023, Barnett was nominated for promotion to rear admiral. Barnett was confirmed by the United States Senate on December 5, 2023.

In September 2025, Barnett assumed command of Navy Region Mid-Atlantic, succeeding Rear Admiral Carl Lahti.

After Barnett's command of Red Hill and his oversight of three large regional commands, he was designated the Navy’s top pick for a third star. He would also have been given a job running the Navy's bases. John C. Phelan, at that time the Secretary of the Navy, and Adm. Daryl Caudle, the Navy's highest-ranking officer, picked Admiral Barnett to lead Navy Installations Command. Gen. Dan Caine, then the chairman of the Joint Chiefs of Staff agreed. Defense Secretary Pete Hegseth, who has objected to promotions he considers to be "diversity hire[s]," blocked Barnett's promotion, based on Barnett's participation in a few Black History month events and his appearance at a Navy-sponsored event during L.G.B.T.Q. Pride month. It is expected that Barnett will retire, as is customary for senior officers who are not promoted.
