= Edward S. Briggs =

United States Navy officer (1926–2022)

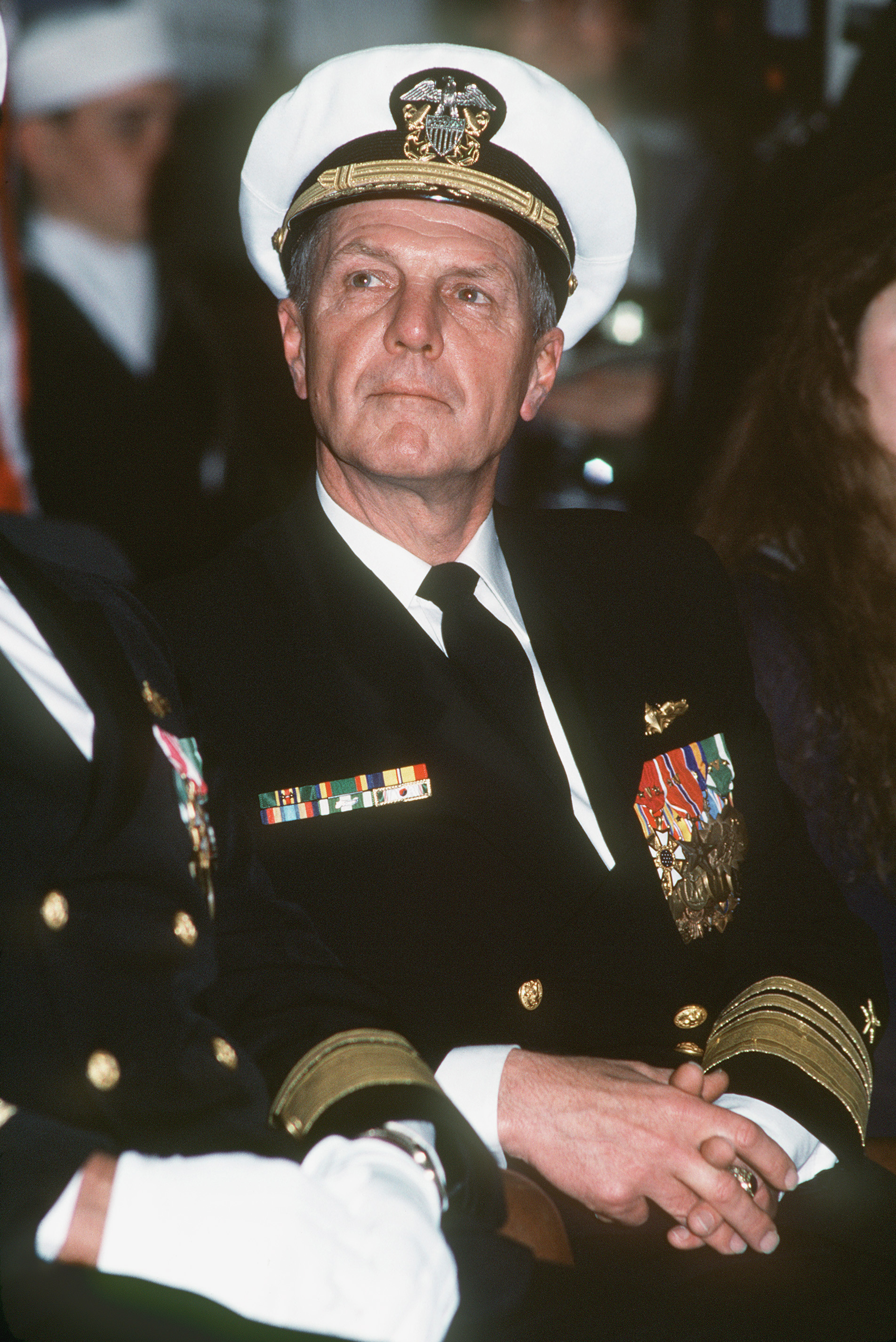
- Briggs in 1983
- Born: October 4, 1926; St. Paul, Minnesota, U.S.
- Died: November 22, 2022 (aged 96); Escondido, California, U.S.
- Military career
- Allegiance: United States of America
- Branch: United States Navy
- Service years: 1949–1984
- Rank: Vice admiral
- Commands: Commander, Naval Surface Force Atlantic

Edward Samuel Briggs (October 4, 1926 – November 22, 2022) was a vice admiral in the United States Navy. Briggs was born in St. Paul, Minnesota, the son of Charles William and Lois lone (née Johnson) Briggs. He served as Commander, Naval Surface Force Atlantic and retired in 1984. He was succeeded by William F. McCauley. Briggs previously served as a Chief of Staff and plans officer to Admiral James L. Holloway III aboard the USS Oklahoma City. He is an alumnus of the United States Naval Academy (class of 1949). His awards include the Navy Distinguished Service Medal and Legion of Merit.

After his retirement he involved himself with local school districts of his residence in southern California. He resided there with his wife, Nanette Parks, whom he married on June 7, 1949. He had a son, Jeffrey.

In 2021, Briggs signed his name to an open letter dated 14 May 2021, from a group calling themselves Flag Officers 4 America, claiming the 2020 election was stolen from Donald Trump.

Briggs died in Escondido, California on November 22, 2022, at the age of 96.
