= Harvey Overesch =

Vice Admiral in the U.S. Navy

Harvey Edward Overesch
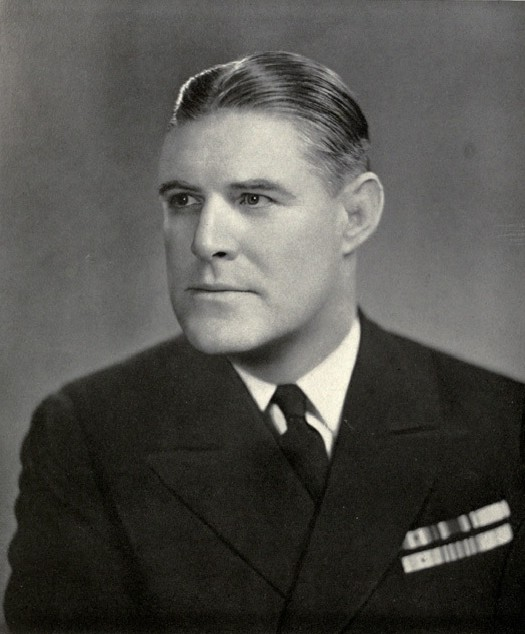
- Born: January 20, 1893; Lafayette, Indiana, U.S.
- Died: January 20, 1973 (aged 80); Annapolis, Maryland, U.S.
- Military career
- Allegiance: United States of America
- Branch: United States Navy
- Service years: 1915–1946
- Rank: Vice admiral
- Commands: Commandant of Midshipmen; USS San Francisco
- Conflicts: World War I World War II: Battle of Kwajalein; Marianas Turkey Shoot; Gilbert and Marshall Islands campaign
- Awards: Legion of Merit; Bronze Star (2)

Harvey Edward Overesch (January 20, 1893 – January 20, 1973) was a Vice admiral in the U.S. Navy and American football player.

A native of Lafayette, Indiana, Overesch attended Purdue University for two years before enrolling as a midshipman at the United States Naval Academy. He played at the end positions for the Navy Midshipmen football team. In December 1913, he was elected as the captain of the 1914 Navy football team. He was also selected as a third-team All-American by Walter Camp in 1914. Overesch also competed for Navy's basketball team and on its eight-oared crew. He won the Navy Athletic Association sword in 1915 for "greatest personal excellence in athletics" in the Academy's Class of 1915.

He was given the nickname "Swede" at the Naval Academy.

Overesch became a career officer in the U.S. Navy, attaining the rank of vice admiral. In November 1937, he was serving as a naval attaché in Shanghai, China, when Japanese forces attacked the city. Overesch provided the Associated Press with his first-hand account of watching the battle from the upper floors of a Chinese teahouse with the nearest fighting less than 50 yards away.

Overesch served for three years with the Pacific Fleet from 1939 to 1942.

In May 1942, Overesch returned to Annapolis as the athletic director of the U.S. Naval Academy. In June 1942, Overesch was appointed as the Commandant of Midshipmen at the Naval Academy. He served as Commandant until December 1943, at which time Overesch was assigned to sea duty.

He was the commander of the heavy cruiser USS San Francisco (CA-38) from 1944 to March 1945. In June 1944, the San Francisco under Overesch's command participated in the naval battle known as the Marianas Turkey Shoot.

In 1951, Overesch was appointed by Director of Central Intelligence, General Walter Bedell Smith to serve as CIA Commander, Far East Command ("FECOM"). By He served at Pershing Heights, Tokyo, Japan as Chief CIA North Asian Command overseeing covert operations in mainland China, Japan, Hong Kong, North and South Korea, Taiwan, Okinawa, and the Philippines. He served in Japan until 1955, when he was transferred the United States Embassy in London.

Overesch was married to Emily Forman of Baltimore. He died on January 20, 1973.

== Decorations ==
Vice Admiral Harvey Overesch's ribbon bar:

| 1st Row | Legion of Merit | Bronze Star Medal w/ one bronze star | Navy Commendation Medal |
| 2nd Row | World War I Victory Medal w/ Escort Clasp | Yangtze Service Medal | China Service Medal |
| 3rd Row | American Defense Service Medal w/ Atlantic Clasp | American Campaign Medal | Asiatic-Pacific Campaign Medal w/ four bronze service stars |
| 4th Row | World War II Victory Medal | Philippine Liberation Medal w/ two stars | Star of Abdon Calderón First Class and Diploma |

== See also ==
- 1914 College Football All-America Team
