= William Macaulay =

William Macaulay may refer to:

- William E. Macaulay, American billionaire businessman
- William Herrick Macaulay, British mathematician
- William MacAulay, Australian politician

== See also ==
- William McCauley (disambiguation)
