= Bruce E. Grooms =

Vice Admiral Bruce E. Grooms
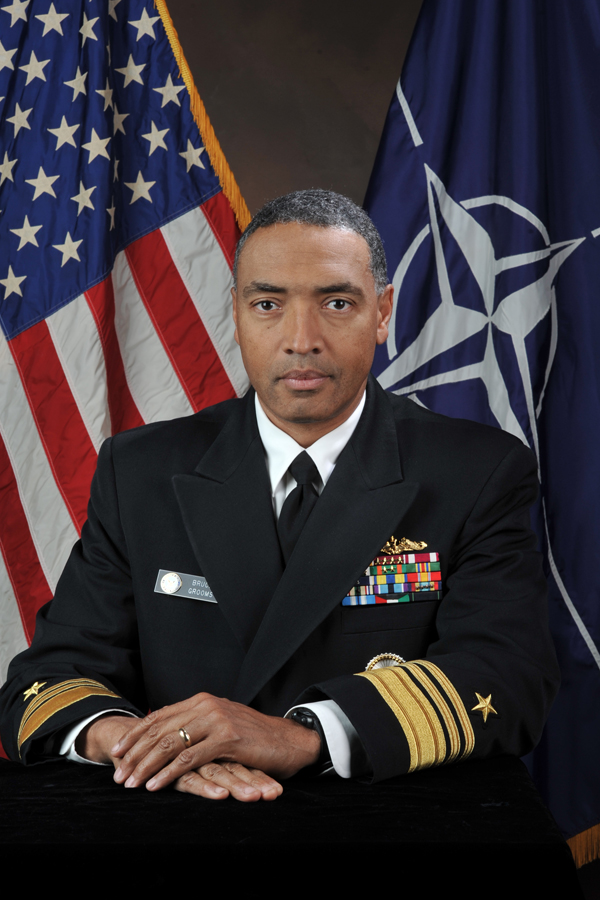
- Vice Admiral Bruce E. Grooms, USN (ret)
- Born: 1958 (age 67–68)
- Education: United States Naval Academy (BS); Naval War College (MS)
- Children: Geoffrey Bruce Grooms, Jared Grooms
- Military career
- Allegiance: United States of America
- Branch: United States Navy
- Service years: 1980–2015
- Rank: Vice Admiral
- Commands: USS Asheville; Submarine Squadron 6 Submarine Group Two
- Awards: Defense Superior Service Medal; Legion of Merit (5); Meritorious Service Medal

Bruce Estes Grooms (born 1958), is a retired vice admiral in the United States Navy. His last duty station before retirement was as Deputy Chief of Staff for Capability Development at Allied Command Transformation. He retired in June 2015.

He served as Commander of Submarine Group TWO and Vice Director of the Joint Staff. He also served as the 81st Commandant of Midshipmen at the United States Naval Academy, responsible for the military and professional development of the Brigade of Midshipmen.

On March 1, 2013, Secretary of Defense Chuck Hagel announced that Grooms is nominated for appointment to the rank of vice admiral and for assignment as Deputy Chief of Staff for Capability Development at Allied Command Transformation by President Barack Obama. He relieved Vice Admiral Carol M. Pottenger from this position.

== Education ==
Originally from Maple Heights, Ohio, Grooms graduated from the United States Naval Academy in 1980 with a Bachelor of Science in Aerospace Engineering.

He earned a master's degree in National Security and Strategic Studies from the Naval War College, graduating with distinction and he attended Stanford University as a National Security Affairs Fellow.

== Career highlights ==
Following completion of nuclear power training, he served in nearly every capacity aboard a variety of submarines, including a tour as executive officer of USS Pasadena (SSN-752), where he twice deployed to the Persian Gulf.

His command tours include service as commanding officer of USS Asheville, where he completed an extremely successful Western Pacific deployment. During his tour the ship received the Battle Efficiency "E" award, the Golden Anchor and Silver Anchor for the highest retention in the submarine force. USS Asheville twice earned the Engineering Excellence "E" award, won the Fleet Recreational Award for best quality of life programs, and twice won the Submarine Squadron Three Commodore's Cup as the best all-around submarine in areas not related to battle efficiency. The ship was the Arleigh Burke Award finalist for most improved in battle efficiency, and the Pacific Fleet NEY Memorial Award finalist. Grooms subsequently served as commander of Submarine Squadron Six, where he was responsible for operations and maintenance of five fast attack submarines and a floating dry-dock. Additionally, he provided local oversight for two Guided Missile Submarines (SSGN) undergoing refueling and conversion.

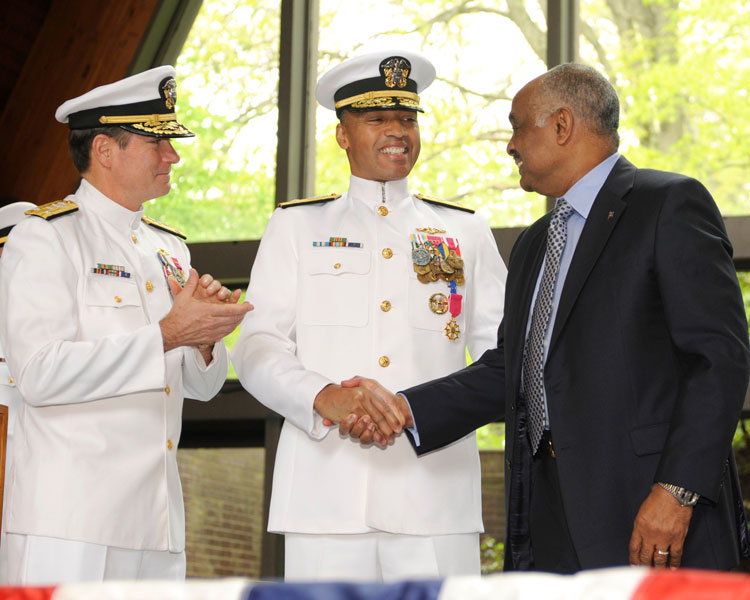
Submarine Group Two Change of Command, May 2009.

Tours ashore include service as a U.S. Naval Academy company officer, the senior inspector on the Atlantic Fleet Nuclear Propulsion Examining Board, service as the senior military aide to the Under Secretary of Defense for Policy, and most recently as deputy director, then director, of Submarine Warfare Division (N87).

He also played varsity basketball for the Midshipmen while attending the U.S. Naval Academy.

He is also the seventh member of the navy's "Centennial Seven", which are the seven African-American sailors to serve as commanding officers of United States submarines in the 20th century. The other members of this group are Capt. C. A. "Pete" Tzomes (ret.), Rear Adm. Tony Watson (ret.), Capt. William F. Bundy (ret.), Vice Adm. Mel Williams, Jr., Capt. Joe Peterson (ret)., and Adm. Cecil D. Haney.

According to his LinkedIn page, Grooms worked from 2015 to 2019 as vice president for Navy and Marine Corps Programs at Raytheon, following his retirement from the United States Navy. Since 2019, he has served as an independent board director at EMCORE Corporation.

== Awards ==
Grooms was selected as the Vice Admiral James Bond Stockdale Award for Inspirational Leadership winner for 1999. He has also been awarded the Defense Superior Service Medal, the Legion of Merit (five awards), the Meritorious Service Medal and various campaign and unit awards.

Military offices
Preceded by Charles J. Leidig	Commandant of Midshipmen; 81st	Succeeded by Margaret D. Klein
Preceded by Cecil D. Haney	Commander Submarine Group Two; March 21, 2008 - May 15, 2009	Succeeded by Paul J. Bushong
