= Charles J. Leidig =

United States Navy admiral (born 1955)

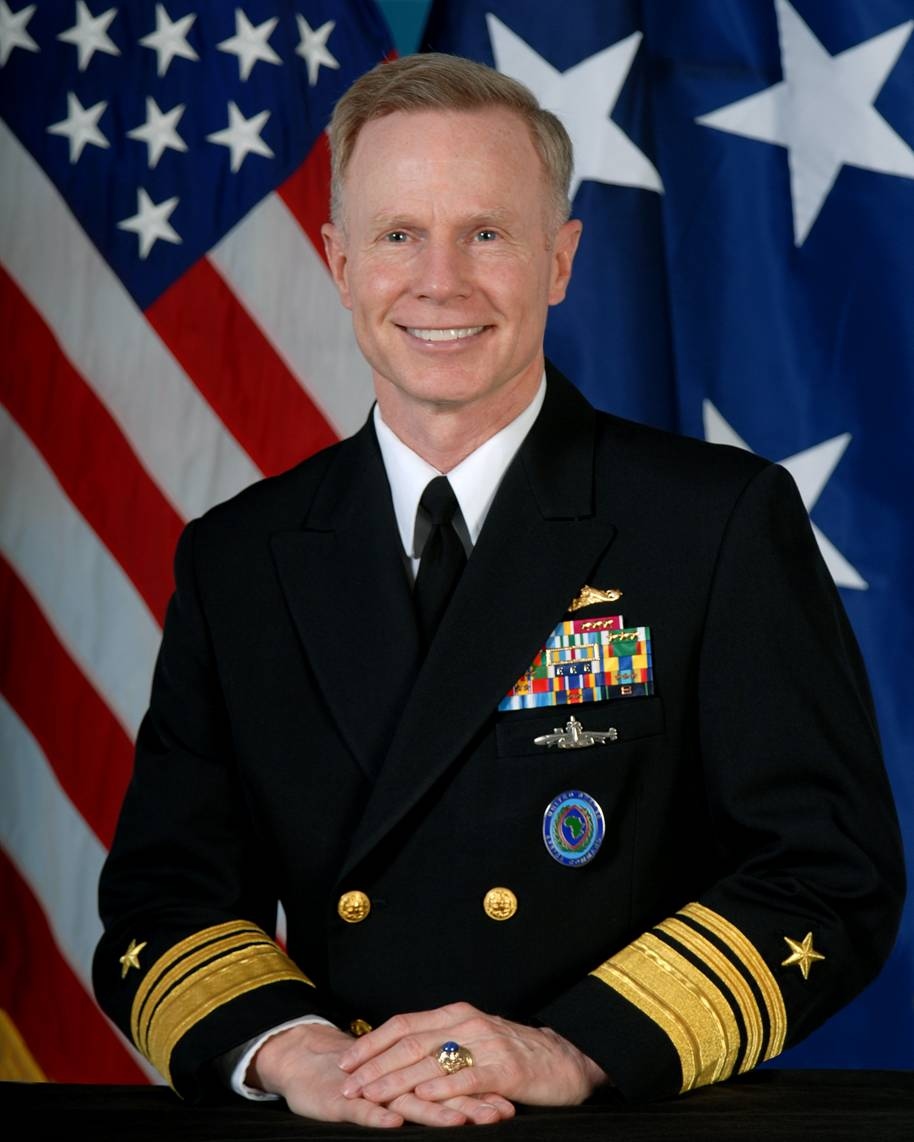
- Born: Charles Joseph Leidig, Jr. 1955 (age 70–71); Philadelphia, Pennsylvania, U.S.
- Military career
- Allegiance: United States
- Branch: United States Navy
- Service years: 1978–2013
- Rank: Vice Admiral
- Nickname: Joe
- Awards: Defense Superior Service Medal; Legion of Merit with two award stars; Meritorious Service Medal with one award star; Joint Service Commendation Medal; Navy and Marine Corps Commendation Medal with three award stars; Navy and Marine Corps Achievement Medal

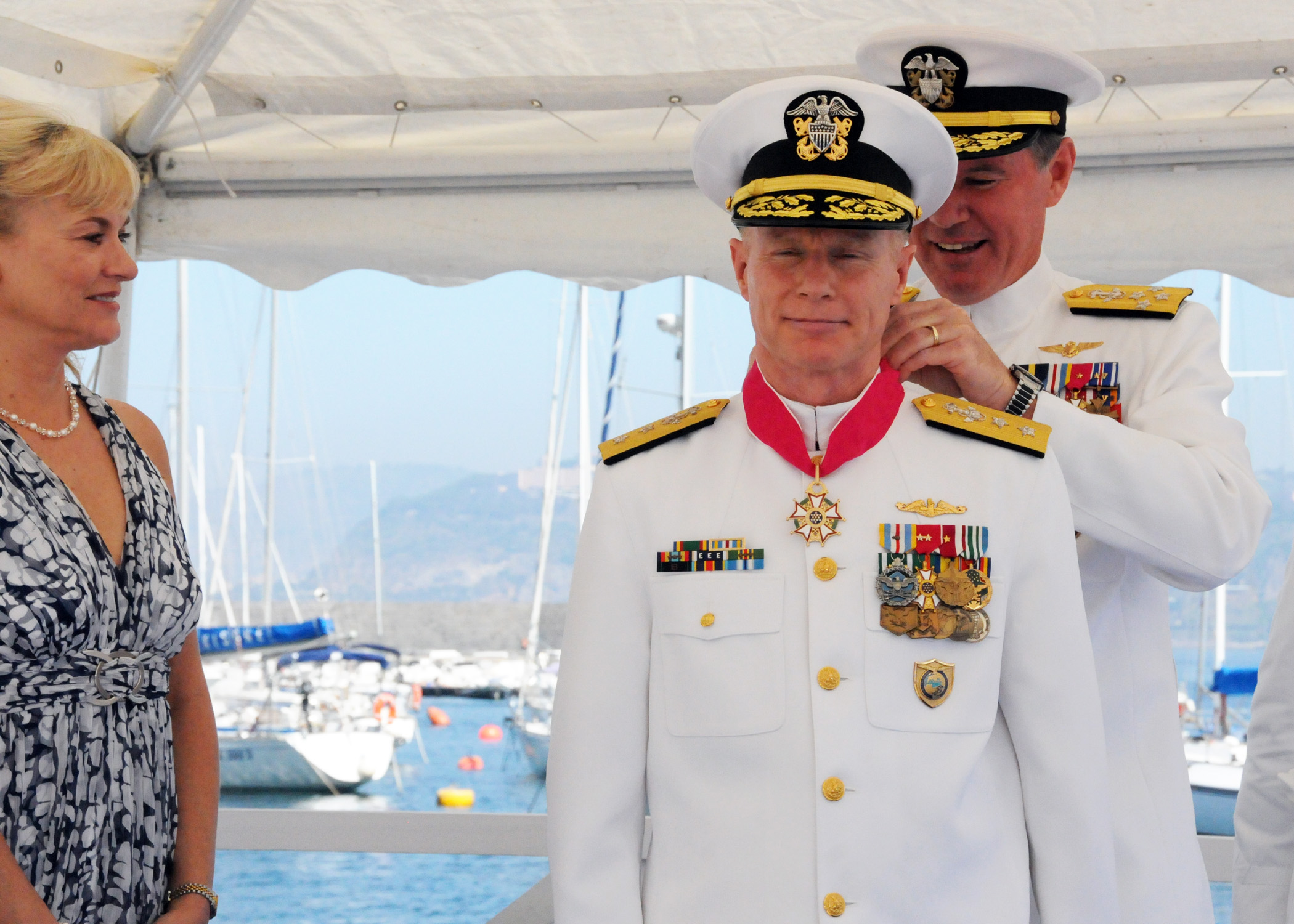
Joe Leidig receiving Legion of Merit

Vice Admiral Charles J. "Joe" Leidig, Jr. (born 1955), USN was the Deputy to the Commander for Military Operations, U.S. Africa Command from August 2010 until June 2013. Leidig retired in September 2013.

== Early life and education ==
Joe Leidig is the eldest of six children of Charles J. "Chuck" Leidig, Sr. (1932–2006) and Irma Hodson Leidig.

In 1978 he graduated with distinction from the U.S. Naval Academy with a Bachelor of Science in Mathematics. He earned a master's degree in National Security and Strategic Studies from the Naval War College as a distinguished graduate in 1994, and subsequently completed the National Security Management Program at the Syracuse University Maxwell School of Citizenship and Public Affairs in 2001.

== Career ==
Vice Admiral Leidig's operational tours include service in both attack and ballistic missile submarines. He served on USS Henry L. Stimson, USS Sam Rayburn, USS Stonewall Jackson and as executive officer on USS Pogy. He received the David Lloyd Leadership Award and the L.Y. Spear Award upon completion of the Submarine Officer Advanced Course.

In 1994, Vice Admiral Leidig assumed command of USS Cavalla. Under his command Cavalla earned two Meritorious Unit Commendations and in 1996 was awarded the Navy Battle Efficiency ‘E’, Engineering Excellence ‘E’, and Tactical Operations Excellence ‘T’. In 1999, he subsequently served as Commander, Submarine Development Squadron Five where he was the operational commander for the Navy's Deep Submergence Program and the Tactical Development Authority for the Submarine Force's off-hull sensors, Arctic warfare and submarine rescue and escape programs.

Vice Admiral Leidig's staff assignments include service as Material Officer on Submarine Squadron Eleven staff, as Senior Member of the Nuclear Propulsion Examining Board, U.S. Atlantic Fleet, as Assistant Deputy Director for Regional Operations on the Joint Staff and as Executive Assistant to the Director of the Joint Staff, and two tours at the U.S. Naval Academy as an instructor and later as the 80th Commandant of Midshipmen. While the Commandant, Admiral Leidig was known for advocating positive leadership.

After retirement, Leidig was called before a joint session of the House Armed Services Committee and the House Oversight Committee on March 20, 2014 and interviewed again by the House Select Committee on Benghazi on April 22, 2016 since he had been assigned to Africa Command at the time of the 2012 terrorist attack.

== Decorations ==
Vice Admiral Leidig's personal decorations include the Defense Distinguished Service Medal, Defense Superior Service Medal, the Legion of Merit (four awards), the Meritorious Service Medal (two awards), the Joint Service Commendation Medal, the Navy Commendation Medal (four awards), and the Navy Achievement Medal along with other unit and service awards.

- Defense Superior Service Medal with one oak leaf cluster
- Legion of Merit with three award stars
- Meritorious Service Medal with one award star
- Joint Service Commendation Medal
- Navy and Marine Corps Commendation Medal with three award stars
- Navy and Marine Corps Achievement Medal

== See also ==
Military offices
Preceded by John R. Allen	Commandant of United States Naval Academy; 2003–2005	Succeeded by Bruce E. Grooms
Preceded by Robert T. Moeller	Deputy to the Commander for Military Operations of the United States Africa Command; 2010–2013	Succeeded by Steven A. Hummer
