= Stephen Liszewski =

U.S Marine Corps General

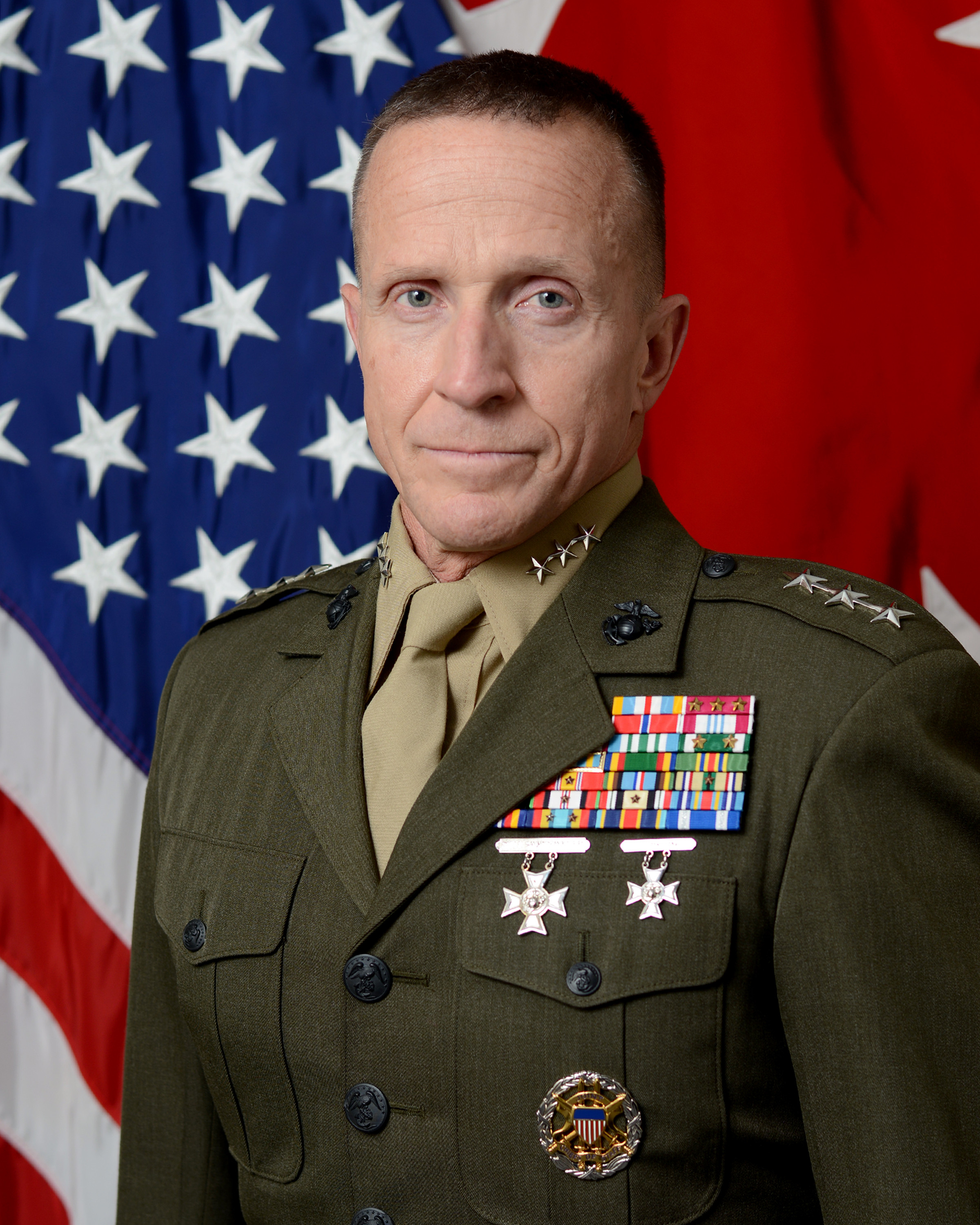
- Official portrait, 2025
- Born: Annapolis, Maryland, U.S.
- Alma mater: United States Naval Academy; University of Canberra; United States Naval War College
- Military career
- Allegiance: United States
- Branch: United States Marine Corps
- Service years: 1990–present
- Rank: Lieutenant General
- Conflicts: Iraq War; War in Afghanistan

Lt. Gen. Liszewski, a native of Annapolis, was raised in Gaithersburg, Maryland. He graduated from the United States Naval Academy and was commissioned as a 2ndLt in the United States Marine Corps in 1990. Assigned as an artillery officer at The Basic School, Liszewski's first tour in the operating forces was with the 1st Battalion, 12th Marines (Rein) where he served in a variety of billets where he learned the basics of leadership and warfighting.

== Biography ==
As a captain, he served as the fire support officer for the 11th Marine Expeditionary Unit (Special Operations Capable) for two deployments and later commanded Battery E, 2nd Battalion, 11th Marines from 1998 to 2000, where he deployed with Battalion Landing Team 1/5 in support of 31st Marine Expeditionary Unit (Special Operations Capable).

As a Major in 5th Battalion, 11th Marines he was the liaison officer, operations officer and executive officer. In 2006, he assumed command of 1st Battalion, 12th Marines (Rein) and deployed to Al Anbar Province, Iraq in support of Operation Iraqi Freedom.

In 2011, he joined I Marine Expeditionary Force (Forward), where he deployed to Helmand Province, Afghanistan in support of Operation Enduring Freedom. Colonel Liszewski commanded the 11th Marine Regiment in the 1st Marine Division from 2012 to 2014.

Lt. Gen. Liszewski's other assignments have included tours with Marine Forces Central Command (Forward) G-3, Marine Forces Pacific G-5 (War Plans), and the Joint Staff (J33, JODCENT). In 2014, he served as the Commandant of the Marine Corps' Fellow at the Council on Foreign Relations in New York City. From 2015 to 2017, he served as the 86th Commandant of midshipmen at the United States Naval Academy. Following that assignment, he served as the Military Assistant to the Secretary of the Navy from 2017 to 2018. From 2018 to 2020 he served as the Director of Operations with Plans, Policies and Operations, Headquarters Marine Corps. From 2020 to 2022, he served on the Joint Staff as the deputy director, Joint Training, Joint Staff J7 and a Director for the Russia / Ukraine Crisis Management Team.
