= Michael D. Haskins =

American Navy admiral

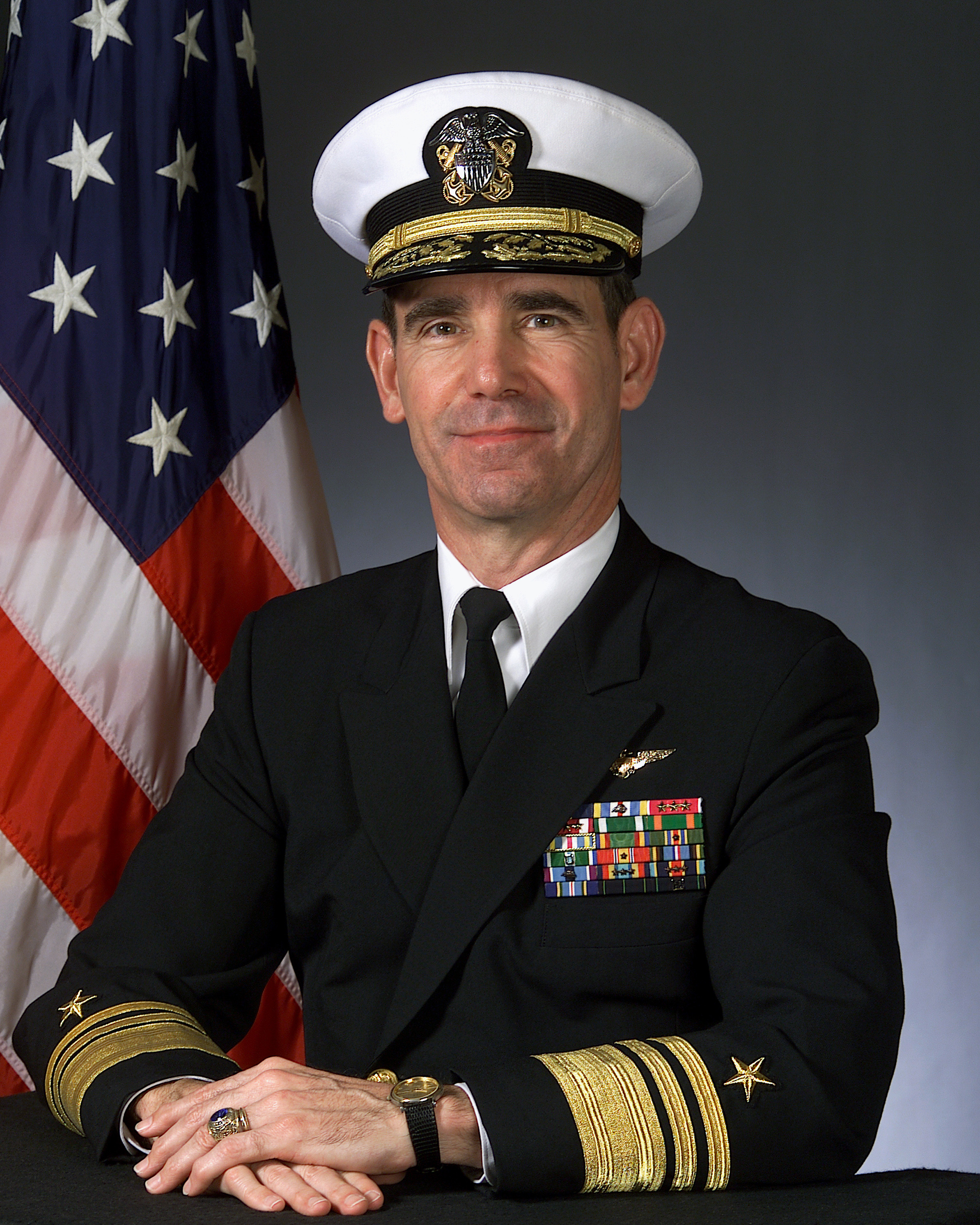
- Born: 8 September 1942 (age 84); Angels Camp, California, U.S.
- Military career
- Allegiance: United States
- Branch: United States Navy
- Service years: 1966–2003
- Rank: Vice Admiral
- Commands: Office of Naval Inspector General; U.S. Naval Forces Japan; Patrol Wings, Atlantic Fleet; Iceland Defense Force; Brigade of Naval Midshipmen; Patrol Wing One; VP-31; VP-1; VP-22
- Awards: Distinguished Service Medal (2); Defense Superior Service Medal (2); Legion of Merit (4)

Michael Donald Haskins (born 8 September 1942) is a retired vice admiral in the United States Navy who was appointed Naval Inspector General in 2000. From 26 September 2001 until his retirement on 1 January 2003, he was U.S. naval aviation's Gray Eagle.

== Early life and education ==
Haskins was born in Angels Camp, California. He attended the United States Naval Academy, graduating first in his class in June 1966. Awarded a Fulbright Scholarship, Haskins studied history at the University of La Plata. Returning from Argentina, he reported to flight training and was designated a naval aviator in September 1968. Selected as a Chief of Naval Operations Scholar in July 1973, he earned a master's degree in international relations and international economics at the University of Oxford.

He is the father of Eileen Laubacher.

== Military career ==
Haskins served with VP-49 in Keflavík, Iceland and VP-45 in Sigonella, Sicily and Bermuda. In July 1980, he became training officer for Patrol Wing Two.

Haskins became executive officer of VP-22 in May 1981 and then served as commanding officer of the squadron from 28 May 1982 to 27 June 1983, deploying to Cubi Point, Philippines. He was given command of VP-1 from 27 June 1983 to 7 May 1984, deploying to Kadena, Okinawa. Haskins later served as commanding officer of VP-31 from 21 June 1985 to 18 July 1986. His promotion to captain was approved by the U.S. Senate in March 1986.

Haskins was given command of Patrol Wing One from July 1988 to July 1990. He became the 74th Commandant of Midshipmen in December 1990. His promotion to rear admiral (lower half) was authorized in April 1992.

Haskins next served as commander of the Iceland Defense Force from August 1992 to August 1994. He was presented the Order of the Falcon by the President of Iceland for his service.

In October 1994, Haskins was given command of the U.S. Atlantic Fleet Patrol Wings. His promotion to rear admiral was approved in June 1995. He served as commander of U.S. Naval Forces Japan from June 1996 to July 1998. Haskins was presented the Order of the Sacred Treasure by the Emperor of Japan for his service.

In August 1998, Haskins became Deputy Commander in Chief of U.S. Naval Forces Europe. Returning to Washington, D.C. in July 2000, he was promoted to vice admiral and assumed command of the Office of Naval Inspector General in August.
