= Navy Region Hawaii =

One of eleven naval regions of the U.S. Navy

Coordinates: 21.3458°N 157.9454°W

Commander, Navy Region Hawaii Navy Region Hawaii
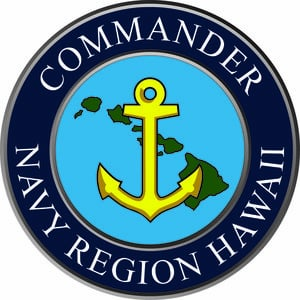
- Command insignia of Navy Region Hawaii
- Active: 1999 - present
- Country: United States
- Branch: United States Navy
- Type: Region Commander
- Part of: Naval Installations Command
- HQ: Joint Base Pearl Harbor–Hickam, Hawaii
- Nickname: CNRH
- Website: cnrh.cnic.navy.mil

Commanders
- Current commander: RADM Stephen D. Barnett

The Navy Region Hawaii (CNRH or NAVREGHI) is one of eleven current naval regions responsible to Commander, Navy Installations Command for the operation and management of Naval shore installations in Hawaii. The region is commanded by RADM Stephen D. Barnett.

The region's most important installation, Joint Base Pearl Harbor–Hickam hosts two of United States Pacific Command subordinate Service components - United States Pacific Fleet on the Pearl Harbor side, and Pacific Air Forces on the Hickam side. The region also oversees installation support for the Pacific Missile Range Facility, the world's largest instrumented, multi-dimensional testing and training missile range in Kekaha, Hawaii.

== History ==
Most of the current day boundaries of Navy Region Hawaii encompass what was previously known as the Fourteenth Naval District. The Fourteenth District was formed in 1916 by then-Acting Secretary of the Navy Charles H. Darling, headquartered on the property of Naval Station Pearl Harbor. By 1945, the district consisted of the following geographic areas: the Hawaiian Islands, and islands to westward, including Midway, Wake, Kure, and Johnston, and Kingman Reef.

The Fourteenth Naval District was disestablished on 30 June 1979 and control was passed on to the Commander in Chief, United States Pacific Fleet.^{[3]}

== Subordinate Units/Installations ==
As an Echelon III commander, Commander, Navy Region Hawaii reports directly to Commander, Navy Installations Command for the operation and readiness of the following subordinate commands/installations:

- Joint Base Pearl Harbor–Hickam
- Pacific Missile Range Facility
- Naval Computer and Telecommunications Area Master Station Pacific

Commander, Navy Surface Group Middle Pacific
- Active: November 2008 - present
- Country: United States
- Branch: United States Navy
- Type: Group Commander
- Part of: United States Third Fleet & Naval Surface Forces Pacific
- HQ: Joint Base Pearl Harbor–Hickam, Hawaii
- Nickname: NAVSURFGRU MIDPAC

Commanders
- Current Commander: RDML Timothy Kott

== Naval Surface Group Middle Pacific ==
The commander of Navy Region Hawaii is also responsible to Commander, United States Third Fleet (operationally) and Commander, Naval Surface Forces Pacific (administratively) as the Commander, Naval Surface Group Middle Pacific, a command that is responsible for the maintenance and training of all surface ships homeported in Hawaii.

As of July 2016, SURFGRU MIDPAC was responsible for Destroyer Squadron 31 and the USS Port Royal (CG-73), both which are homeported at Naval Station Pearl Harbor.
