= William F. McCauley =

United States Navy admiral (1931–2019)

William F. "Scot" McCauley
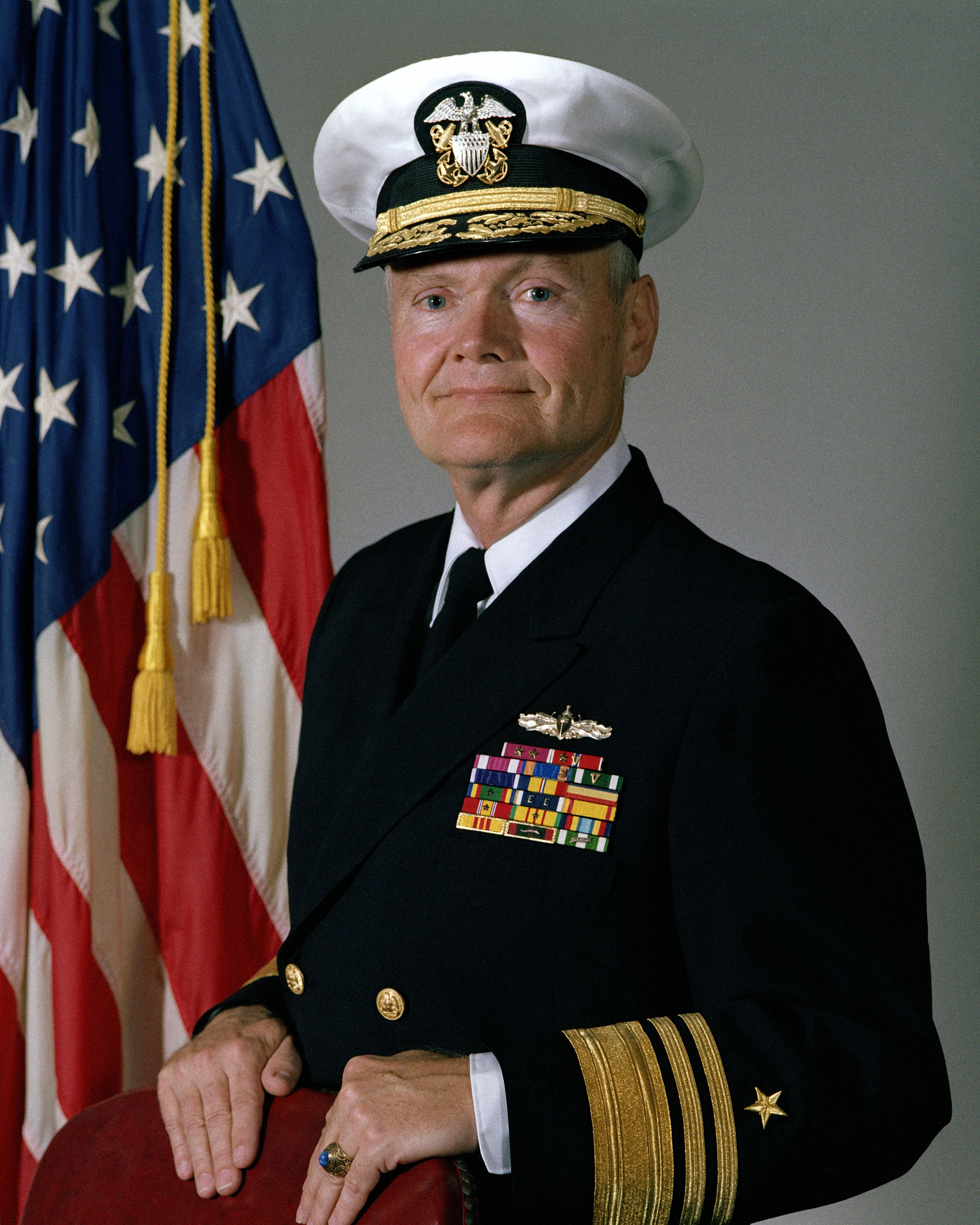
- Vice Admiral McCauley in 1984
- Born: William Frederick McCauley; June 23, 1931; Omaha, Nebraska, U.S.
- Died: April 18, 2019 (aged 87); San Diego, California, U.S.
- Military career
- Allegiance: United States
- Branch: United States Navy
- Service years: 1955–1988
- Rank: Vice admiral
- Nickname: Scot
- Commands: Destroyer Group Eight; USS Halsey; USS Brooke

William F. (Scot) McCauley (June 23, 1931 – April 18, 2019) was a vice admiral and Surface Warfare Officer in the United States Navy. He graduated from the United States Naval Academy in 1955. McCauley retired from active duty in the Navy in 1988. In later life, he wrote three published novels.

His 1966 Ph.D. dissertation at the University of Nebraska was entitled Defense Procurement and Contracting: An Analysis of Management Changes and Impacts on the Defense Industry.
