= JCU =

JCU may refer to:

- James Cook University, in Queensland, Australia
- John Cabot University, in Rome, Italy
- John Carroll University, in Ohio, United States
- Jarvis Christian University, in Texas, United States
- Joint Communications Unit, of the United States Special Operations Command
- Ceuta Heliport
- University of South Bohemia in České Budějovice (Czech: Jihočeská univerzita v Českých Budějovicích, JČU)
