= Richard Scholtes =

United States Army major general

Richard A. Scholtes
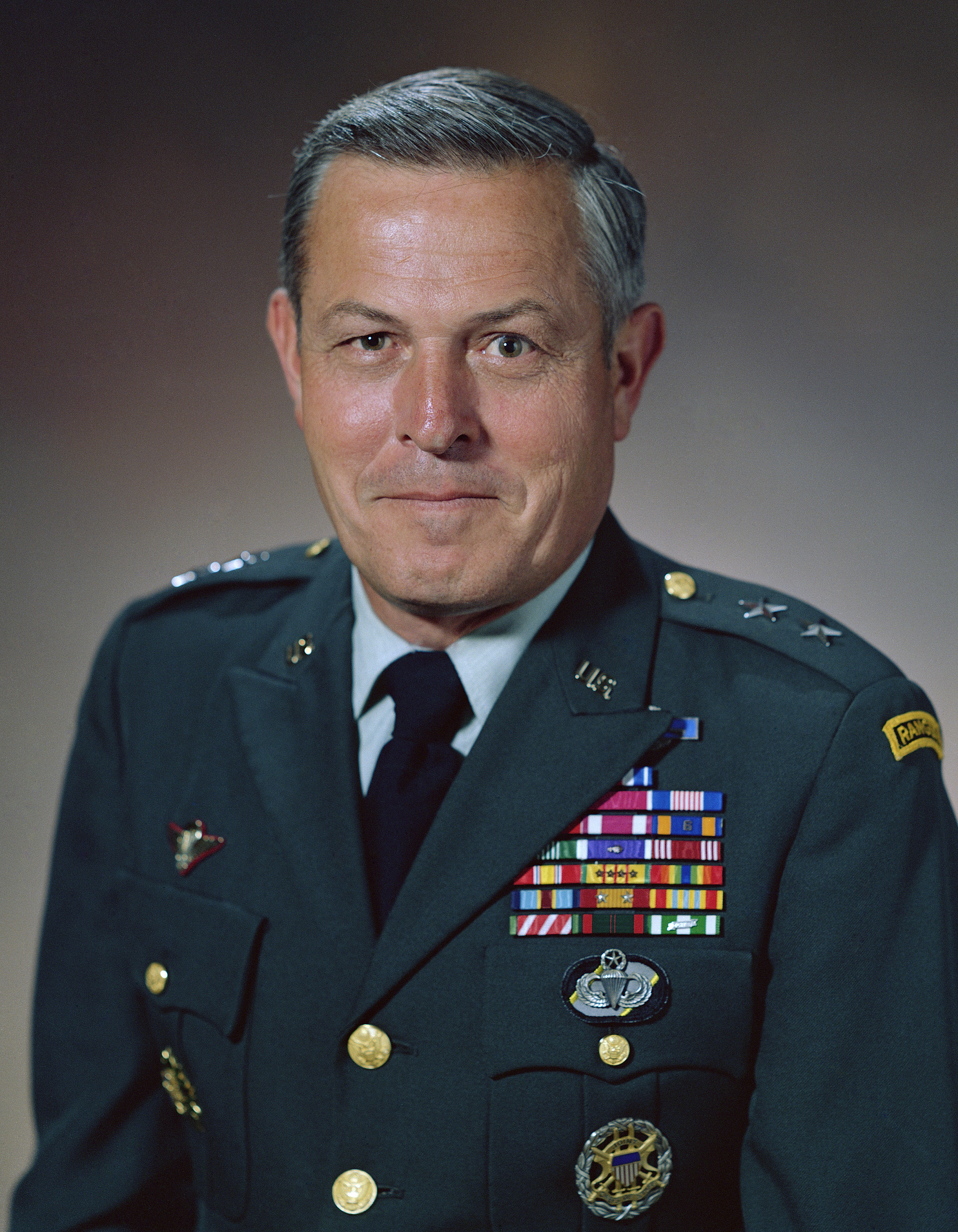
- Major General Richard A. Scholtes
- Born: 18 March 1934 (age 92); Joliet, Illinois, U.S.
- Military career
- Allegiance: United States
- Branch: United States Army
- Service years: 1951–1986
- Rank: Major General
- Commands: 2nd Armored Division; Joint Special Operations Command; Brigade 76, 4th Infantry Division; 2nd Brigade, 4th Infantry Division; 1st Battalion, 61st Infantry Regiment, 5th Infantry Division
- Conflicts: Vietnam War
- Awards: Silver Star Medal; Defense Superior Service Medal; Legion of Merit; Soldier's Medal; Bronze Star Medal (2); Purple Heart (2); Meritorious Service Medal; Air Medal (6)

Richard Adrian Scholtes (born 18 March 1934) is a retired United States Army major general who served as the first commander of Joint Special Operations Command. Scholtes' experience as the commander of Joint Special Operations Task Force 123 during the United States invasion of Grenada made him an important figure in the reorganization of the US special operations community. After his tenure as JSOC commander, Scholtes retired from active service so he could candidly testify in August 1986 before Congress about the perceived need for a separate, four-star, special operations command. Then-Senator William Cohen described Scholtes' testimony as vital in the decision of Congress to create the United States Special Operations Command.

Scholtes enlisted in the Army on 31 October 1951. He is a 1957 graduate of the United States Military Academy with a B.S. degree in military science. Scholtes later earned an M.B.A. degree in data processing from George Washington University.

== Awards and decorations ==
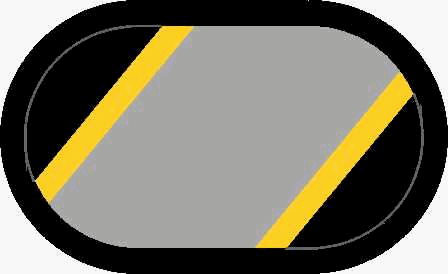
- Unidentified jump wings
