= United States Special Operations Command =

U.S. Armed Forces unified command

- United States Special Operations Command Emblem
- Founded: 16 April 1987; 39 years ago (39 years, 6 months ago)
- Country: United States
- Type: Unified combatant command Special operations forces
- Role: Functional combatant command
- Size: Entire command: 70,000: Headquarters staff: 2,500
- Part of: United States Department of Defense
- Headquarters: MacDill Air Force Base; Florida, U.S.
- Nicknames: USSOCOM, SOCOM
- Engagements: Operation Earnest Will; Invasion of Panama; Gulf War; Unified Task Force Operation Gothic Serpent: Battle of Mogadishu; Operation Uphold Democracy; War on terror: War in Afghanistan; Iraq War; Operation Inherent Resolve
- Website: www.socom.mil

Commanders
- Commander: Admiral Frank M. Bradley, USN
- Deputy Commander: Lieutenant General Sean M. Farrell, USAF
- Vice Commander: Lieutenant General Steven M. Marks, USA
- Senior Enlisted Leader: Command Sergeant Major Andrew J. Krogman, USA

Insignia
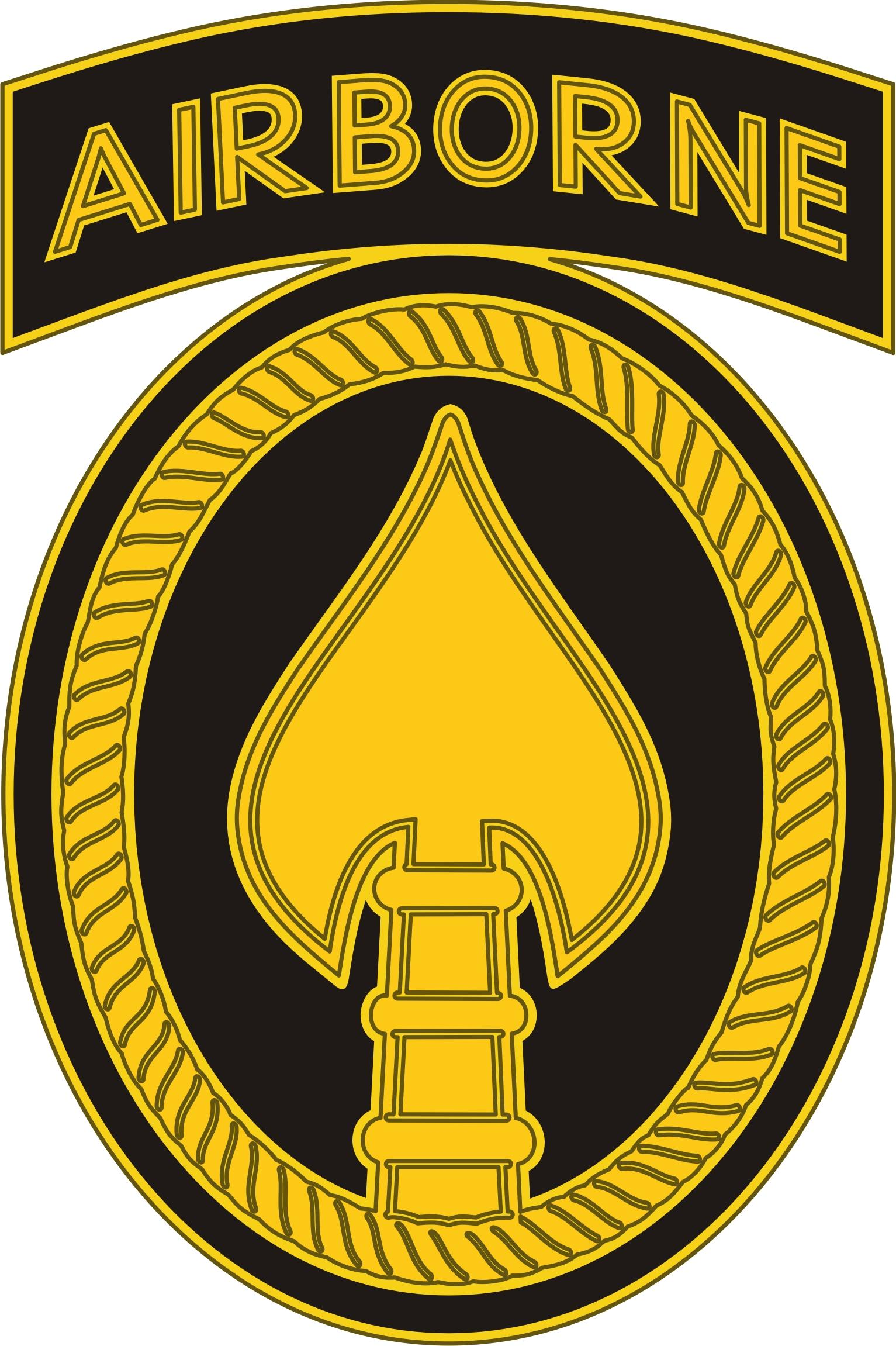
- Special Operations Command Army CSIB

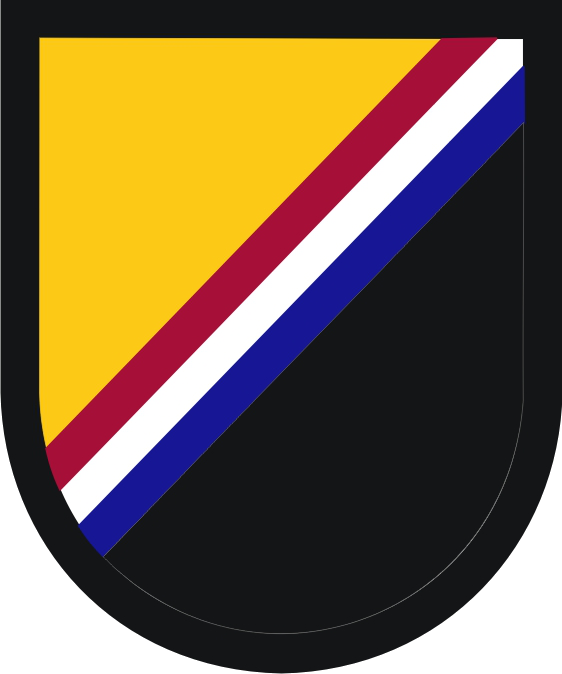
- Beret flash (for United States Army only)

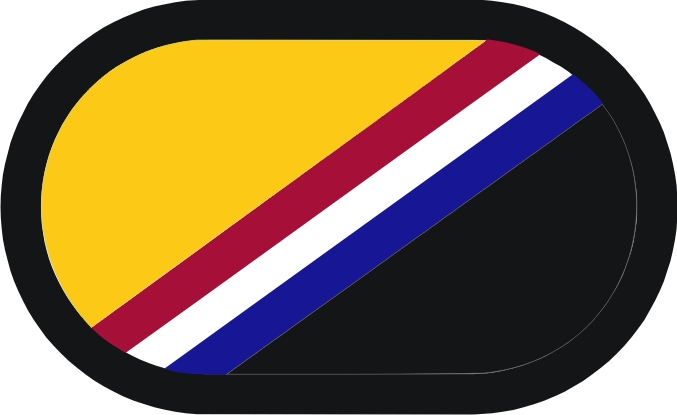
- Background trimming (for United States Army only)

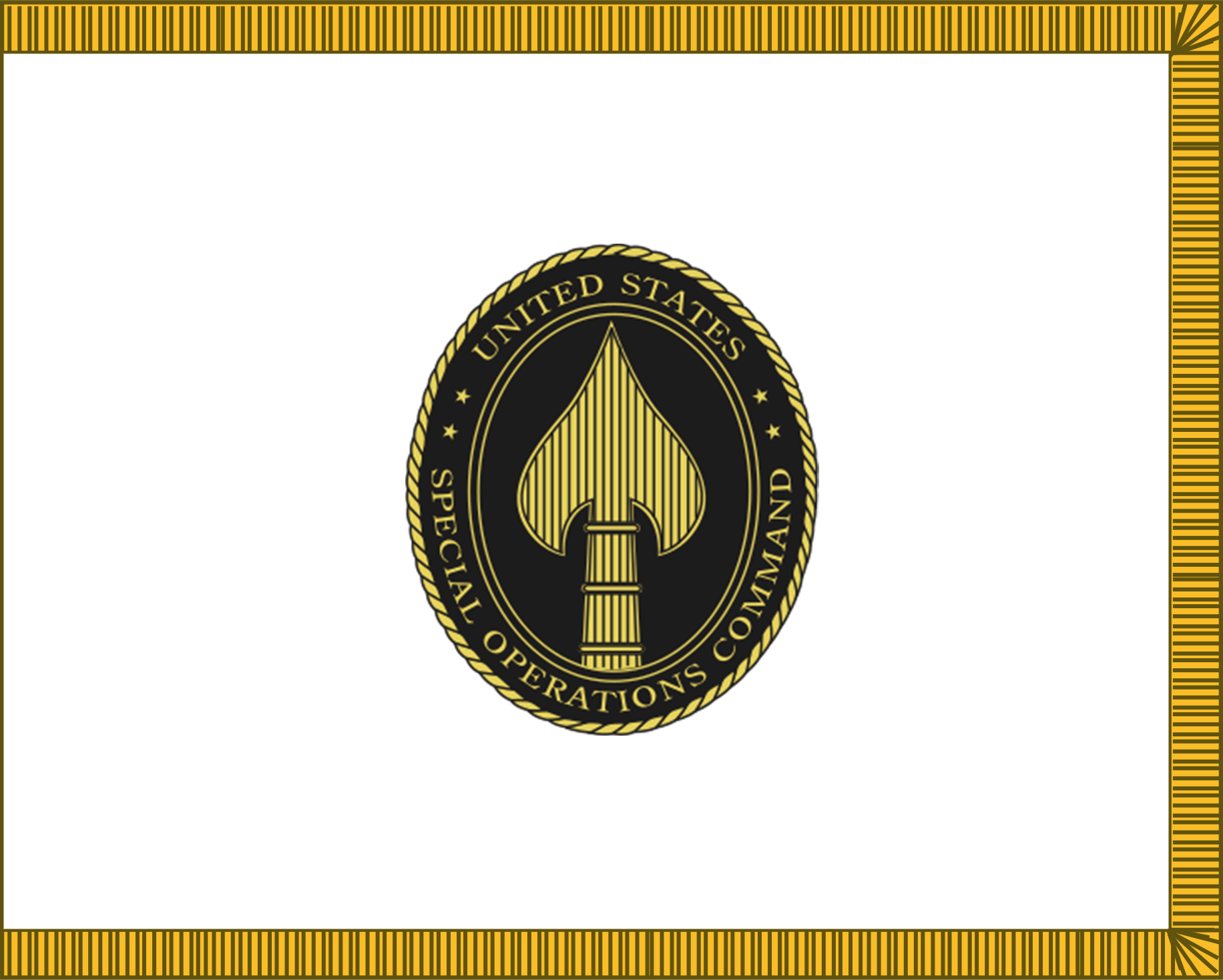
- US Joint Special Operations Command Flag

The United States Special Operations Command (USSOCOM or SOCOM) is the unified combatant command charged with overseeing the various special operations component commands of the Army, Marine Corps, Navy, Air Force, and Space Force of the United States Armed Forces. The command is part of the Department of Defense. USSOCOM is headquartered at MacDill Air Force Base in Tampa, Florida.

The idea of an American unified special operations command had its origins in the aftermath of Operation Eagle Claw, the disastrous attempted rescue of hostages at the American embassy in Iran in 1980. The ensuing investigation, chaired by Admiral James L. Holloway III, the retired chief of naval operations, cited lack of command and control and inter-service coordination as significant factors in the failure of the mission. Since its activation on 16 April 1987, U.S. Special Operations Command has participated in many operations, from the 1989 invasion of Panama to the war on terror.

USSOCOM is involved with clandestine activity, such as direct action, special reconnaissance, counter-terrorism, foreign internal defense, unconventional warfare, psychological warfare, civil affairs, and counter-narcotics operations. Each branch has a distinct Special Operations Command that is capable of running its own operations, but when the different special operations forces need to work together for an operation, USSOCOM becomes the joint component command of the operation, instead of a SOC of a specific branch.

== History ==
The unwieldy command and control structure of separate U.S. military special operations forces (SOF), which led to the failure of Operation Eagle Claw in 1980, highlighted the need within the US Department of Defense for reform and reorganization. The US Army chief of staff, General Edward C. "Shy" Meyer, had already helped create the U.S. Delta Force in 1977. Following Eagle Claw, he called for a further restructuring of special operations capabilities. Although unsuccessful at the joint level, Meyer nevertheless went on to consolidate Army SOF units under the new 1st Special Operations Command in 1982.

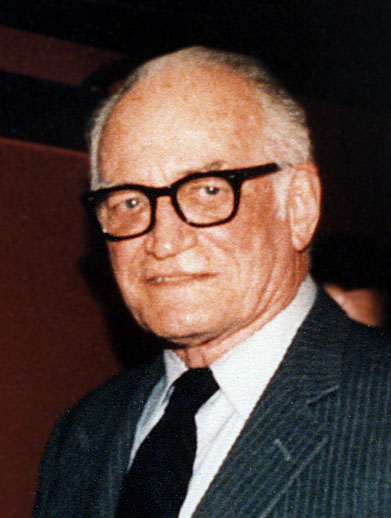
Senator Barry Goldwater, former chairman of the Senate Armed Services Committee in 1986

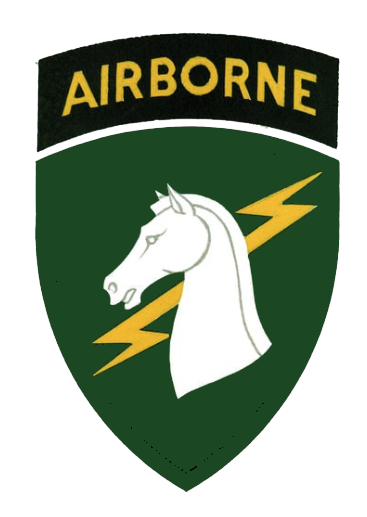
1st SOCOM SSI 1982-1990

By 1983, there was a small but growing sense in the US Congress of the need for military reforms. In June, the Senate Armed Services Committee (SASC) began a two-year-long study of the Defense Department, which included an examination of SOF spearheaded by Senator Barry Goldwater (R-AZ). With concern mounting on Capitol Hill, the Department of Defense created the Joint Special Operations Agency on 1 January 1984; this agency, however, had neither operational nor command authority over any SOF. The Joint Special Operations Agency thus did little to improve SOF readiness, capabilities, or policies, and therefore was deemed insufficient. Within the Defense Department, there were a few staunch SOF supporters. Noel Koch, Principal Deputy Assistant Secretary of Defense for International Security Affairs, and his deputy, Lynn Rylander, both advocated SOF reforms.

At the same time, a few on Capitol Hill were determined to overhaul United States Special Operations Forces. They included senators Sam Nunn (D-GA) and William Cohen (R-ME), both members of the Armed Services Committee, and Representative Dan Daniel (D-VA), the chairman of the United States House Armed Services Subcommittee on Readiness. Congressman Daniel had become convinced that the U.S. military establishment was not interested in special operations, that the country's capability in this area was second rate, and that SOF operational command and control was an endemic problem. Senators Nunn and Cohen also felt strongly that the Department of Defense was not preparing adequately for future threats. Senator Cohen agreed that the U.S. needed a clearer organizational focus and chain of command for special operations to deal with low-intensity conflicts.

In October 1985, the Senate Armed Services Committee published the results of its two-year review of the U.S. military structure, entitled "Defense Organization: The Need For Change." James R. Locher III, the principal author of this study, also examined past special operations and speculated on the most likely future threats. This influential document led to the Goldwater–Nichols Act of 1986. By spring 1986, SOF advocates had introduced reform bills in both houses of Congress. On 15 May, Senator Cohen introduced the Senate bill, co-sponsored by Senator Nunn and others, which called for a joint military organization for SOF and the establishment of an office in the Defense Department to ensure adequate funding and policy emphasis for low-intensity conflict and special operations. Representative Daniel's proposal went even further—he wanted a national special operations agency headed by a civilian who would bypass the Joint Chiefs and report directly to the US secretary of defense; this would keep Joint Chiefs and the Services out of the SOF budget process.

Congress held hearings on the two bills in the summer of 1986. Admiral William J. Crowe Jr., Chairman of the Joint Chiefs of Staff, led the Pentagon's opposition to the bills. As an alternative, he proposed a new Special Operations Forces command led by a three-star general. This proposal was not well received on Capitol Hill—Congress wanted a four-star general in charge to give SOF more influence. A number of retired military officers and others testified in favor of the need for reform. By most accounts, retired Army Major General Richard Scholtes gave the most compelling reasons for the change. Scholtes, who commanded the joint special operations task force during Operation Urgent Fury, explained how conventional force leaders misused SOF during the operation, not allowing them to use their unique capabilities, which resulted in high SOF casualties. After his formal testimony, Scholtes met privately with a small number of Senators to elaborate on the problems that he had encountered in Grenada.

Both the House and Senate passed SOF reform bills and these went to a conference committee for reconciliation. Senate and House conferees forged a compromise. The bill called for a unified combatant command headed by a four-star general for all SOF, an Assistant Secretary of Defense for Special Operations and Low-Intensity Conflict, a coordinating board for low-intensity conflict within the National Security Council, and a new Major Force Program (MFP-11) for SOF (the so-called "SOF checkbook"). The final bill, attached as a rider to the 1987 Defense Authorization Act, amended the Goldwater-Nichols Act and was signed into law in October 1986. This was interpreted as Congress forcing the hand of the DOD and the Reagan administration regarding what it saw as the past failures and emerging threats. The DOD and the administration were responsible for implementing the law, and Congress subsequently passed two additional bills to ensure implementation. The legislation promised to improve SOF in several respects. Once implemented, MFP-11 provided SOF with control over its own resources, better enabling it to modernize the force. Additionally, the law fostered interservice cooperation: a single commander for all SOF promoted interoperability among the same command forces. The establishment of a four-star commander-in-chief and an Assistant Secretary of Defense for Special Operations and Low-Intensity Conflict eventually gave SOF a voice in the highest councils of the Defense Department.

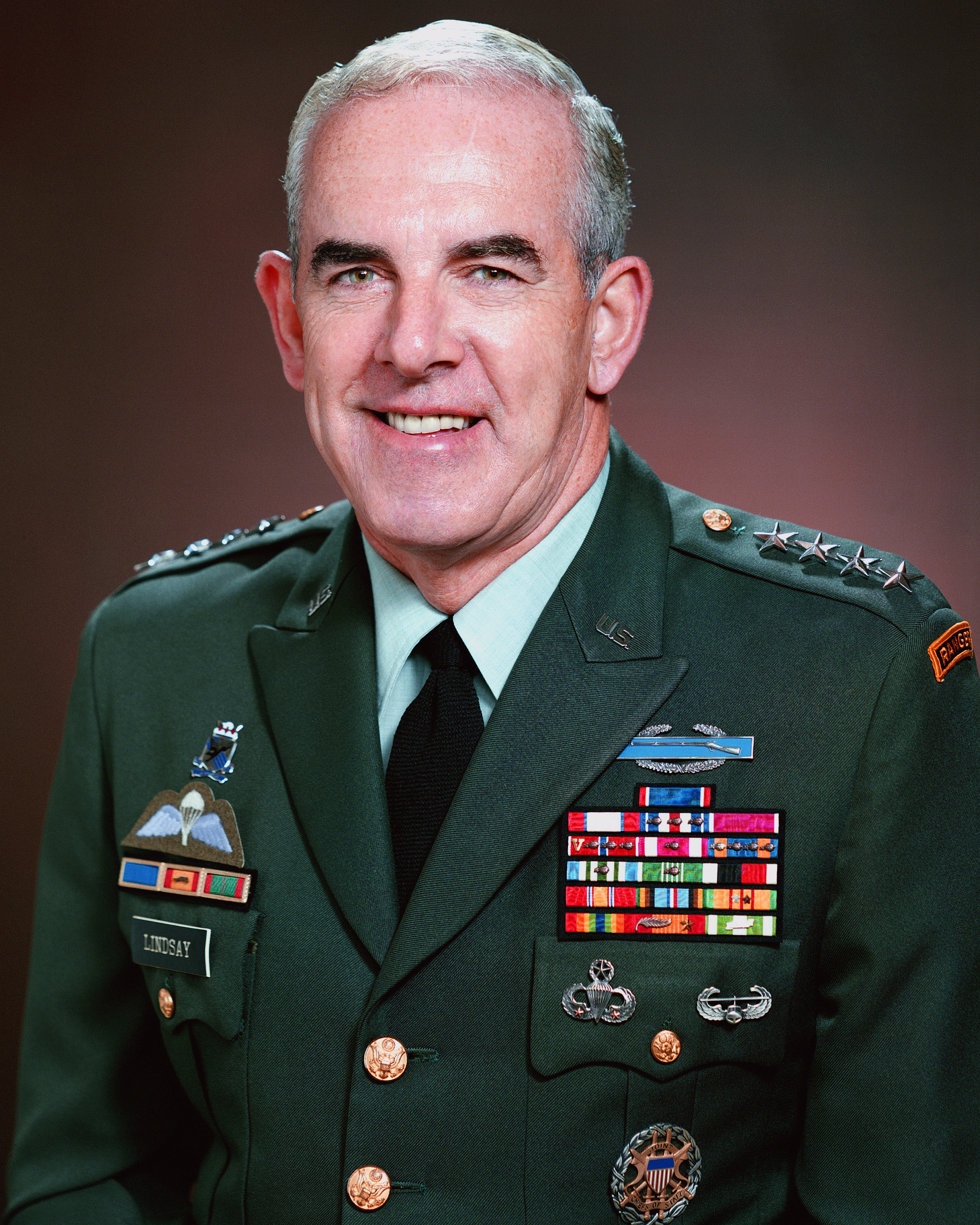
General James Lindsay, the first Commander in Chief, Special Operations Command in 1986

However, implementing the provisions and mandates of the Nunn-Cohen Amendment to the National Defense Authorization Act for Fiscal Year 1987 was neither rapid nor smooth. One of the first issues to arise was the appointment of an Assistant Secretary of Defense for Special Operations and Low Intensity Conflict, whose principal duties included monitorship of special operations activities and the low-intensity conflict activities of the Department of Defense. Congress increased the number of assistant secretaries of defense from 11 to 12, but the Department of Defense still did not fill this new billet. In December 1987, Congress directed Secretary of the Army John O. Marsh to carry out the ASD (SO/LIC) duties until the Senate approved a suitable replacement. Not until 18 months after the legislation passed did Ambassador Charles Whitehouse assume the duties of ASD (SO/LIC).

Meanwhile, the establishment of USSOCOM provided its own measure of excitement. A quick solution to manning and basing a brand new unified command was to abolish an existing command. United States Readiness Command (USREDCOM), with an often misunderstood mission, did not appear to have a viable mission in the post-Goldwater-Nichols era, and its commander-in-chief, General James Lindsay, had had some special operations experience. On 23 January 1987, the Joint Chiefs of Staff recommended to the Secretary of Defense that USREDCOM be disestablished to provide billets and facilities for USSOCOM. President Ronald Reagan approved the establishment of the new command on 13 April 1987. The Department of Defense activated USSOCOM on 16 April 1987 and nominated General Lindsay to be the first Commander in Chief Special Operations Command (USCINCSOC). The Senate accepted him without debate.

=== Operation Earnest Will ===
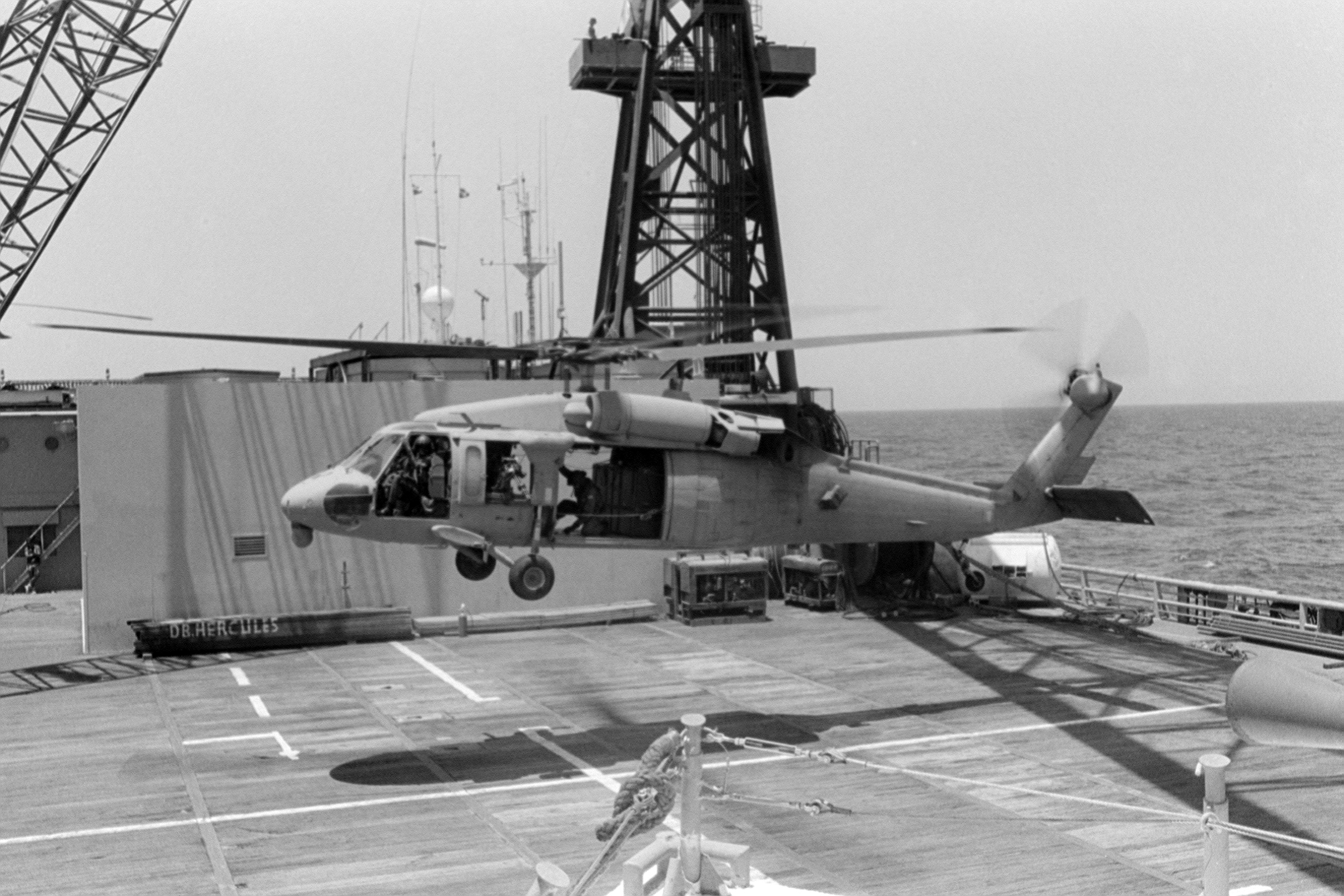
MH-60 landing on Hercules (c. 1 June 1988)

USSOCOM's first tactical operation involved 160th Special Operations Aviation Regiment (Airborne) ("Night Stalkers") aviators, SEALs, and Special Boat Teams (SBT) working together during Operation Earnest Will in September 1987. During Operation Earnest Will, the United States ensured that neutral oil tankers and other merchant ships could safely transit the Persian Gulf during the Iran–Iraq War. Iranian attacks on tankers prompted Kuwait to ask the United States in December 1986 to register 11 Kuwaiti tankers as American ships so that they could be escorted by the U.S. Navy. President Reagan agreed to the Kuwaiti request on 10 March 1987, hoping it would deter Iranian attacks. The protection offered by U.S. naval vessels, however, did not stop Iran, which used mines and small boats to harass the convoys steaming to and from Kuwait. In late July 1987, Rear Admiral Harold J. Bernsen, commander of the Middle East Force, requested NSW assets. Special Boat Teams deployed with six Mark III Patrol Boats and two SEAL platoons in August. The Middle East Force decided to convert two oil servicing barges, Hercules and Wimbrown VII, into mobile sea bases. The mobile sea bases allowed SOF in the northern Persian Gulf to thwart clandestine Iranian mining and small boat attacks.

On 21 September, Nightstalkers flying MH-60 and Little Birds took off from the frigate USS Jarrett to track an Iranian ship, Iran Ajr. The Nightstalkers observed Iran Ajr turn off her lights and begin laying mines. After receiving permission to attack, the helicopters fired guns and rockets, stopping the ship. As Iran Ajr's crew began to push mines over the side, the helicopters resumed firing until the crew abandoned the ship. Special Boat Teams provided security while a SEAL team boarded the vessel at first light and discovered nine mines on the vessel's deck, as well as a logbook revealing areas where previous mines had been laid. The logbook implicated Iran in mining international waters.

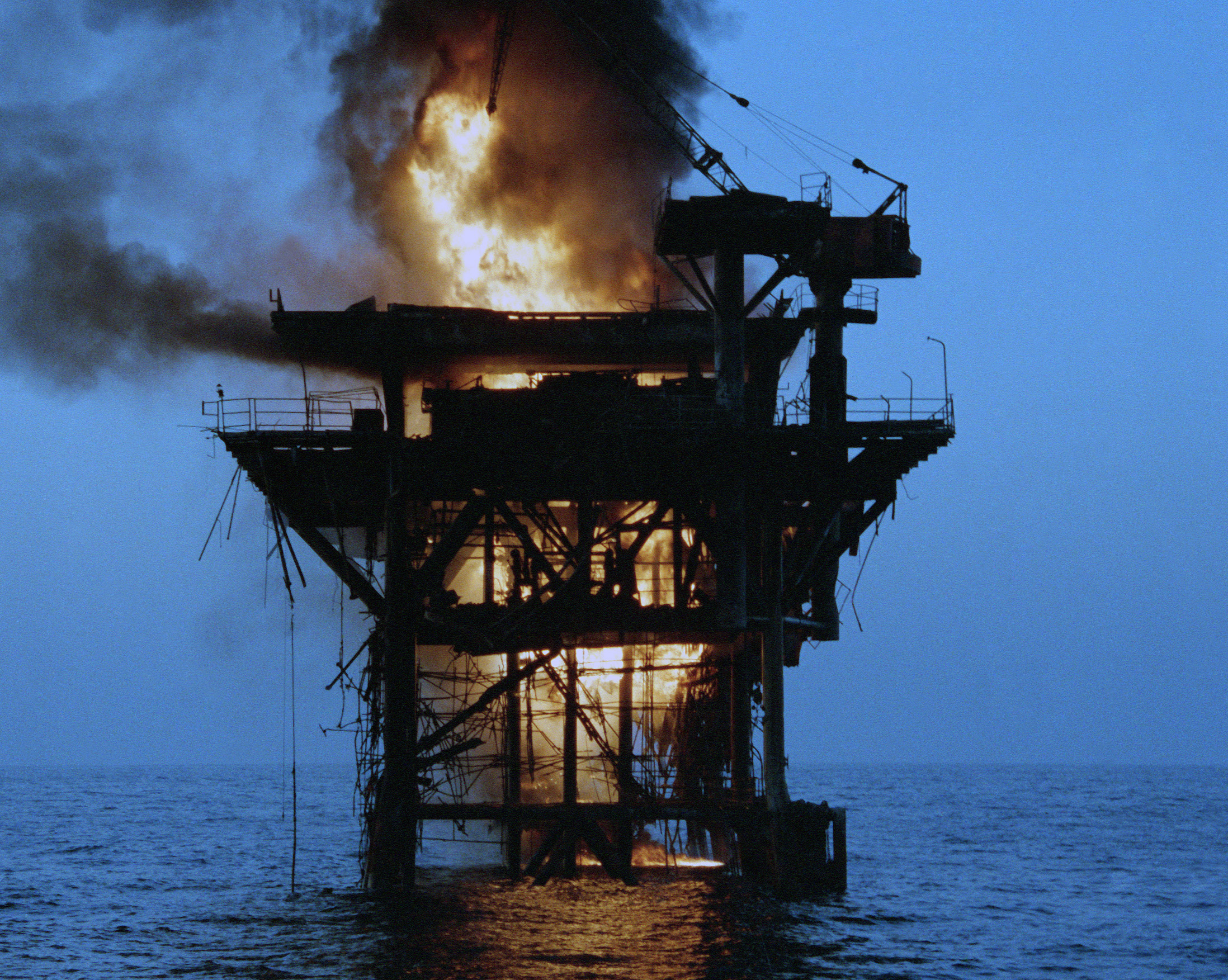
One of two Iranian oil platforms set ablaze after shelling by American destroyers (19 October 1987)

Within a few days, the Special Operations forces had determined the Iranian pattern of activity; the Iranians hid during the day near oil and gas platforms in Iranian waters and at night, they headed toward the Middle Shoals Buoy, a navigation aid for tankers. With this knowledge, SOF launched three Little Bird helicopters and two patrol craft to the buoy. The Little Bird helicopters arrived first and were fired upon by three Iranian boats anchored near the buoy. After a short but intense firefight, the helicopters sank all three boats. Three days later, in mid-October, an Iranian Silkworm missile hit the tanker Sea Isle City near the oil terminal outside Kuwait City. Seventeen crewmen and the American captain were injured in the missile attack. During Operation Nimble Archer, four destroyers shelled two oil platforms in the Rostam oil field. After the shelling, a SEAL platoon and a demolition unit planted explosives on one of the platforms to destroy it. The SEALs next boarded and searched a third-platform 2 miles (3 km) away. Documents and radios were taken for intelligence purposes.

On 14 April 1988, 65 miles (100 km) east of Bahrain, the frigate USS Samuel B. Roberts hit a mine, blowing an immense hole in its hull. Ten sailors were injured. During Operation Praying Mantis, the U.S. retaliated fiercely, attacking the Iranian frigate Sahand and oil platforms in the Sirri and Sassan oil fields. After U.S. warships bombarded the Sirri platform and set it ablaze, a UH-60 with a SEAL platoon flew toward the platform but was unable to get close enough because of the roaring fire. Secondary explosions soon wrecked the platform. Thereafter, Iranian attacks on neutral ships dropped drastically. On 18 July, Iran accepted the United Nations cease-fire; on 20 August 1988, the Iran–Iraq War ended. The remaining SEALs, patrol boats, and helicopters then returned to the United States. Special operations forces provided critical skills necessary to help CENTCOM gain control of the northern Persian Gulf and balk Iran's small boats and minelayers. The ability to work at night proved vital because Iranian units used darkness to conceal their actions. Additionally, because of Earnest Will operational requirements, USSOCOM would acquire new weapons systems—the patrol coastal ships and the Mark V Special Operations Craft.

=== Somalia ===
Special Operations Command first became involved in Somalia in 1992, as part of Operation Provide Relief. C-130s circled over Somali airstrips during the delivery of relief supplies. Special Forces medics accompanied many relief flights into the airstrips throughout southern Somalia to assess the area. They were the first U.S. soldiers in Somalia, arriving before U.S. forces who supported the expanded relief operations of Restore Hope. The first teams into Somalia were CIA Special Activities Division paramilitary officers with elements of JSOC. They conducted very high-risk advanced force operations prior to the entry of the follow-on forces. The first casualty of the conflict came from this team and was a Paramilitary officer and former Delta Force operator named Larry Freedman. Freedman was awarded the Intelligence Star for "extraordinary heroism" for his actions.

The earliest missions during Operation Restore Hope were conducted by Navy SEALs. The SEALs performed several hydrographic reconnaissance missions to find suitable landing sites for Marines. On 7 December, the SEALs swam into Mogadishu Harbor, where they found suitable landing sites, assessed the area for threats, and concluded that the port could support offloading ships. This was a tough mission because the SEALs swam against a strong current which left many of them overheated and exhausted. Furthermore, they swam through raw sewage in the harbor, which made them sick. When the first SEALs hit the shore the following night, they were surprised to meet members of the news media. The first Marines came ashore soon thereafter, and the press redirected their attention to them. Later, the SEALs provided personal security for President George H. W. Bush during a visit to Somalia. In December 1992, Special Forces assets in Kenya moved to Somalia and joined Operation Restore Hope. In January 1993, a Special Forces command element deployed to Mogadishu as the Joint Special Operations Forces-Somalia (JSOFOR) that would command and control all special operations for Restore Hope. JSOFOR's mission was to make initial contact with indigenous factions and leaders; provide information for force protection; and provide reports on the area for future relief and security operations. Before redeploying in April, JSOFOR elements drove over 26,000 miles (42,000 km), captured 277 weapons, and destroyed over 45,320 pounds (20,560 kg) of explosives.

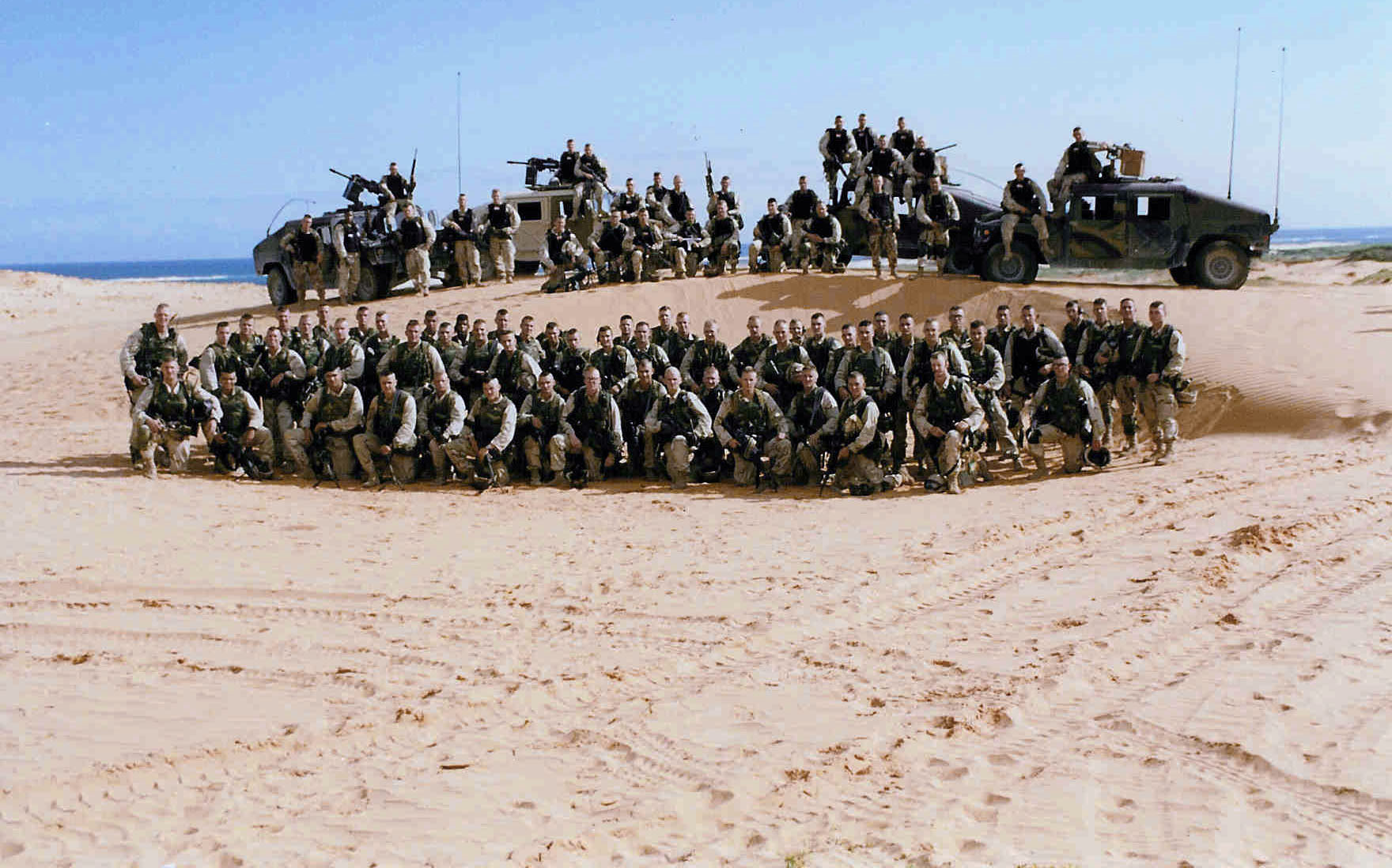
Bravo Company, 3rd Battalion of the 75th Ranger Regiment in Somalia, 1993

In August 1993, Secretary of Defense Les Aspin directed the deployment of a Joint Special Operations Task Force (JSOTF) to Somalia in response to attacks made by General Mohamed Farrah Aidid's supporters upon U.S. and UN forces. The JSOTF, named Task Force (TF) Ranger, was charged with a mission named Operation Gothic Serpent to capture Aidid. This was an especially arduous mission, for Aidid had gone underground, after several Lockheed AC-130 air raids and UN assaults on his strongholds.

While Marines from the 24th MEU provided an interim QRF (Force Recon Det and helicopters from HMM-263), the task force arrived in the country and began training exercises. The Marines were asked to take on the Aidid snatch mission, but having the advantage of being in the area for more than two months, decided after mission analysis that the mission was a "no-go" due to several factors, centered around the inability to rescue the crew of a downed helicopter (re: the indigenous forces technique of using RPGs against helicopters and blocking the narrow streets in order to restrict the movement of a ground rescue force). This knowledge was not passed on to the Rangers, due to the Marines operating from the USS Wasp and the Rangers remaining on land. TF Ranger was made up of operators from Delta Force, 75th Ranger Regiment, 160th SOAR, SEALs from the Naval Special Warfare Development Group, and Air Force special tactics units. During August and September 1993, the task force conducted six missions into Mogadishu, all of which were successes. Although Aidid remained free, the effect of these missions seriously limited his movements.

On 3 October, TF Ranger launched its seventh mission, this time into Aidid's stronghold the Bakara Market, to capture two of his key lieutenants. The mission was expected to take only one or two hours. Helicopters carried an assault and a ground convoy of security teams launched in the late afternoon from the TF Ranger compound at Mogadishu airport. The TF came under increasingly heavy fire, more intense than during previous missions. The assault team captured 24 Somalis including Aidid's lieutenants and were loading them onto the convoy trucks when a MH-60 Blackhawk was hit by a rocket-propelled grenade (RPG). A small element from the security forces, as well as an MH-6 assault helicopter and an MH-60 carrying a fifteen-man combat search and rescue (CSAR) team, rushed to the crash site. The battle became increasingly worse. An RPG struck another MH-60, crashing less than 1 mile (1.6 km) to the south of the first downed helicopter. The task force faced overwhelming Somali mobs that overran the crash sites, causing a dire situation. A Somali mob overran the second site and, despite a heroic defense, killed everyone except the pilot, whom they took prisoner. Two defenders of this crash site, Master Sergeant Gary Gordon and Sergeant First Class Randall Shughart, were posthumously awarded the Medal of Honor. About this time, the mission's quick reaction force (QRF) also tried to reach the second crash site. This force too was pinned by the Somali fire and required the fire support of two AH-6 helicopters before it could break contact and make its way back to the base.

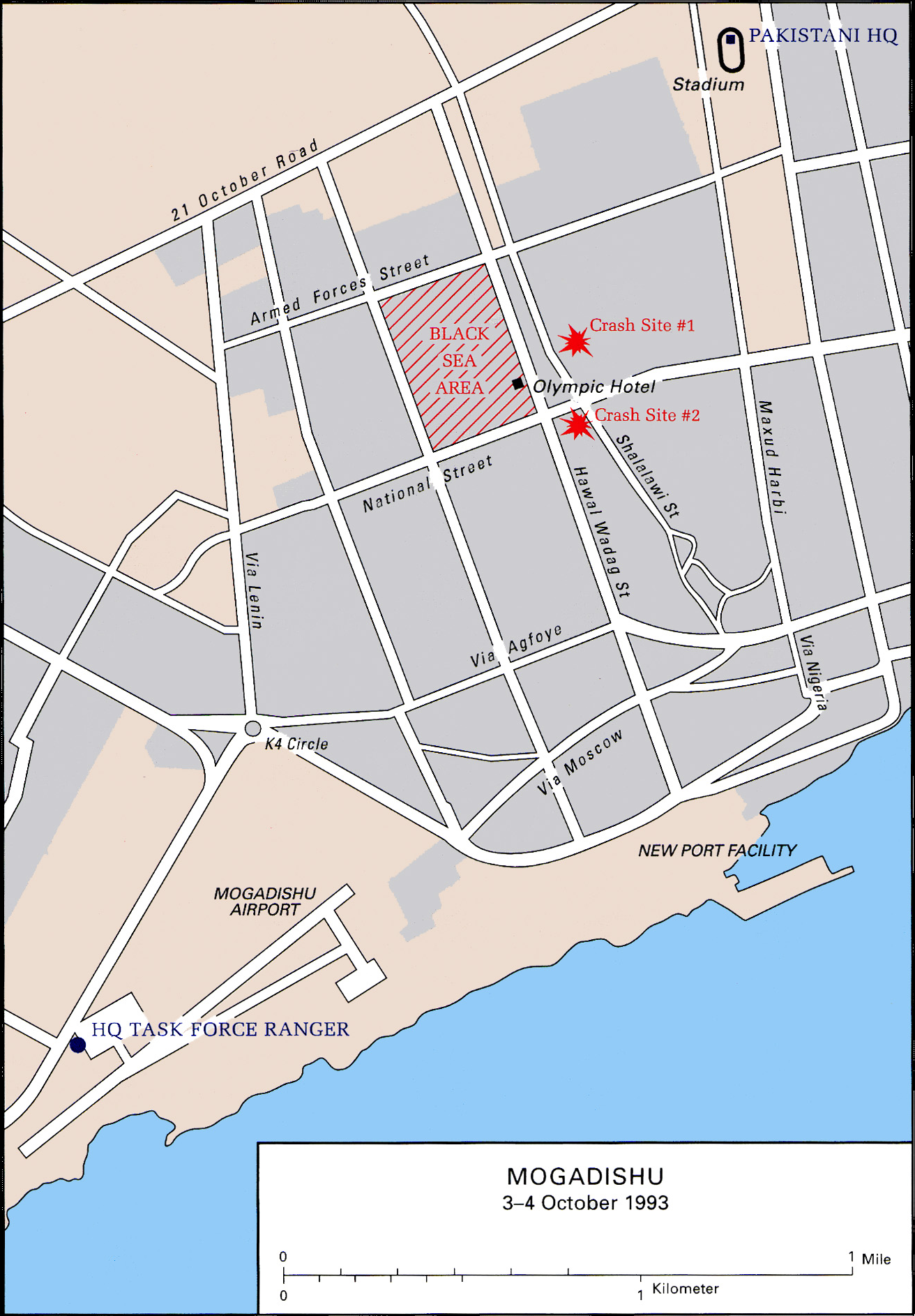
Map of the main battle sites during the Battle of Mogadishu (1993)

The assault and security elements moved on foot towards the first crash area, passing through heavy fire, and occupied buildings south and southwest of the downed helicopter. They fought to establish defensive positions so as not to be pinned down by the very heavy enemy fire while treating their wounded and worked to free the pilot's body from the downed helicopter. With the detainees loaded on trucks, the ground convoy force attempted to reach the first crash site. Unable to find it amongst the narrow, winding alleyways, the convoy came under devastating small arms and RPG fire. The convoy had to return to base after suffering numerous casualties and sustaining substantial damage to their vehicles.

Reinforcements, consisting of elements from the QRF, 10th Mountain Division soldiers, Rangers, SEALs, Pakistan Army tanks and Malaysian armored personnel carriers, finally arrived at 1:55 am on 4 October. The combined force worked until dawn to free the pilot's body, receiving RPG and small arms fire throughout the night. All the casualties were loaded onto the armored personnel carriers, and the remainder of the force was left behind and had no choice but to move out on foot. AH-6 gunships raked the streets with fire to support the movement. The main force of the convoy arrived at the Pakistani Stadium-compound for the QRF-at 6:30 am, thus concluding one of the bloodiest and fiercest urban firefights since the Vietnam War. Task Force Ranger experienced a total of 17 killed in action and 106 wounded. Various estimates placed Somali casualties above 1,000. Although Task Force Ranger's few missions were successes, the overall outcome of Operation Gothic Serpent was deemed a failure because of the Task Force's failure to complete their stated mission, capturing Mohamed Farrah Aidid. Most U.S. forces pulled out of Somalia by March 1994. The withdrawal from Somalia was completed in March 1995. Even though Operation Gothic Serpent failed, USSOCOM still made significant contributions to operations in Somalia. SOF performed reconnaissance and surveillance missions, assisted with humanitarian relief, protected American forces, and conducted riverine patrols. Additionally, they ensured the safe landing of the Marines and safeguarded the arrival of merchant ships carrying food.

=== Iraq ===
USSOCOM's 10th Special Forces Group, elements of JSOC, and CIA/SAD Paramilitary Officers linked up again and were the first to enter Iraq prior to the invasion. Their efforts organized the Kurdish Peshmerga to defeat Ansar Al Islam in Northern Iraq before the invasion. This battle was for control of a territory in Northeastern Iraq that was completely occupied by Ansar Al Islam, an ally of Al Qaeda. This was a very significant battle and led to the death of a substantial number of terrorists and the uncovering of a chemical weapons facility at Sargat. These terrorists would have been in the subsequent insurgency had they not been eliminated during this battle. Sargat was the only facility of its type discovered in the Iraq war. This battle may have been the Tora Bora of Iraq, but it was a sound defeat for Al Qaeda and their ally Ansar Al Islam. This combined team then led the Peshmerga against Saddam's Northern Army. This effort kept Saddam's forces in the north and denied the ability to redeploy to contest the invasion force coming from the south. This effort may have saved the lives of hundreds, if not thousands of coalition servicemen and women.

At the launch of the Iraq War, dozens of 12-member Special Forces teams infiltrated southern and western Iraq to hunt for Scud missiles and pinpoint bombing targets. Scores of Navy SEALs seized oil terminals and pumping stations on the southern coast. Air Force combat controllers flew combat missions in MC-130H Combat Talon IIs and established austere desert airstrips to begin the flow of soldiers and supplies deep into Iraq. It was notably different from the Persian Gulf war of 1991, where Special Operations forces were mostly kept participating. But it would not be a replay of Afghanistan, where Army Special Forces and Navy SEALs led the fighting. After their star turn in Afghanistan, many special operators were disappointed to play a supporting role in Iraq. Many special operators felt restricted by cautious commanders. From that point, USSOCOM has since killed or captured hundreds of insurgents and Al-Qaeda terrorists. It has conducted several foreign internal defense missions, successfully training the Iraqi security forces.

=== Afghanistan ===
United States Special Operations Command played a pivotal role in fighting the former Taliban government in Afghanistan in 2001 and toppling it thereafter, as well as combating the insurgency and capturing Saddam Hussein in Iraq. USSOCOM in 2004 was developing plans to have an expanded and more complex role in the global campaign against terrorism, and that role continued to emerge before and after the killing of Osama bin Laden in Pakistan in 2011. In 2010, "of about 13,000 Special Operations forces deployed overseas, about 9,000 [were] evenly divided between Iraq and Afghanistan."

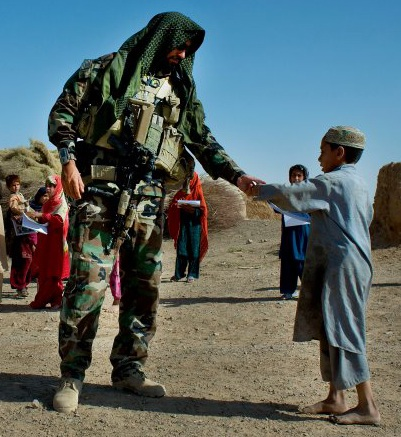
A Special Forces soldier from 7th SFG(A) gives an Afghan boy a coloring book in Kandahar Province during a meeting with local leaders, 12 September 2002

In the initial stages of the War in Afghanistan, USSOCOM forces linked up with CIA Paramilitary Officers from Special Activities Division to defeat the Taliban without the need for large-scale conventional forces. This was one of the biggest successes of the global war on terrorism. These units linked up several times during this war and engaged in several furious battles with the enemy. One such battle happened during Operation Anaconda, the mission to squeeze the life out of a Taliban and Al-Qaeda stronghold dug deep into the Shah-i-Kot Valley and Arma Mountains of eastern Afghanistan. The operation was seen as one of the heaviest and bloodiest fights in the War in Afghanistan. The battle on an Afghan mountaintop called Takur Ghar featured special operations forces from all 4 services and the CIA. Navy SEALs, Army Rangers, Air Force Combat Controllers, and Pararescuemen fought against entrenched Al-Qaeda fighters atop a 10,000-foot (3,000 m) mountain. Subsequently, the entrenched Taliban became targets of every asset in the sky. According to an executive summary, the Battle of Takur Ghar was the most intense firefight American special operators have been involved in since 18 U.S. Army Rangers were killed in Mogadishu, Somalia, in 1993. During Operation Red Wings on 28 June 2005, four Navy SEALs, pinned down in a firefight, radioed for help. A Chinook helicopter, carrying 16 service members, responded but was shot down. All members of the rescue team and three of four SEALs on the ground died. It was the worst loss of life in Afghanistan since the invasion in 2001. The Navy SEAL Marcus Luttrell alone survived. Team leader Michael P. Murphy was awarded the Medal of Honor for his actions in the battle.

=== Global presence ===
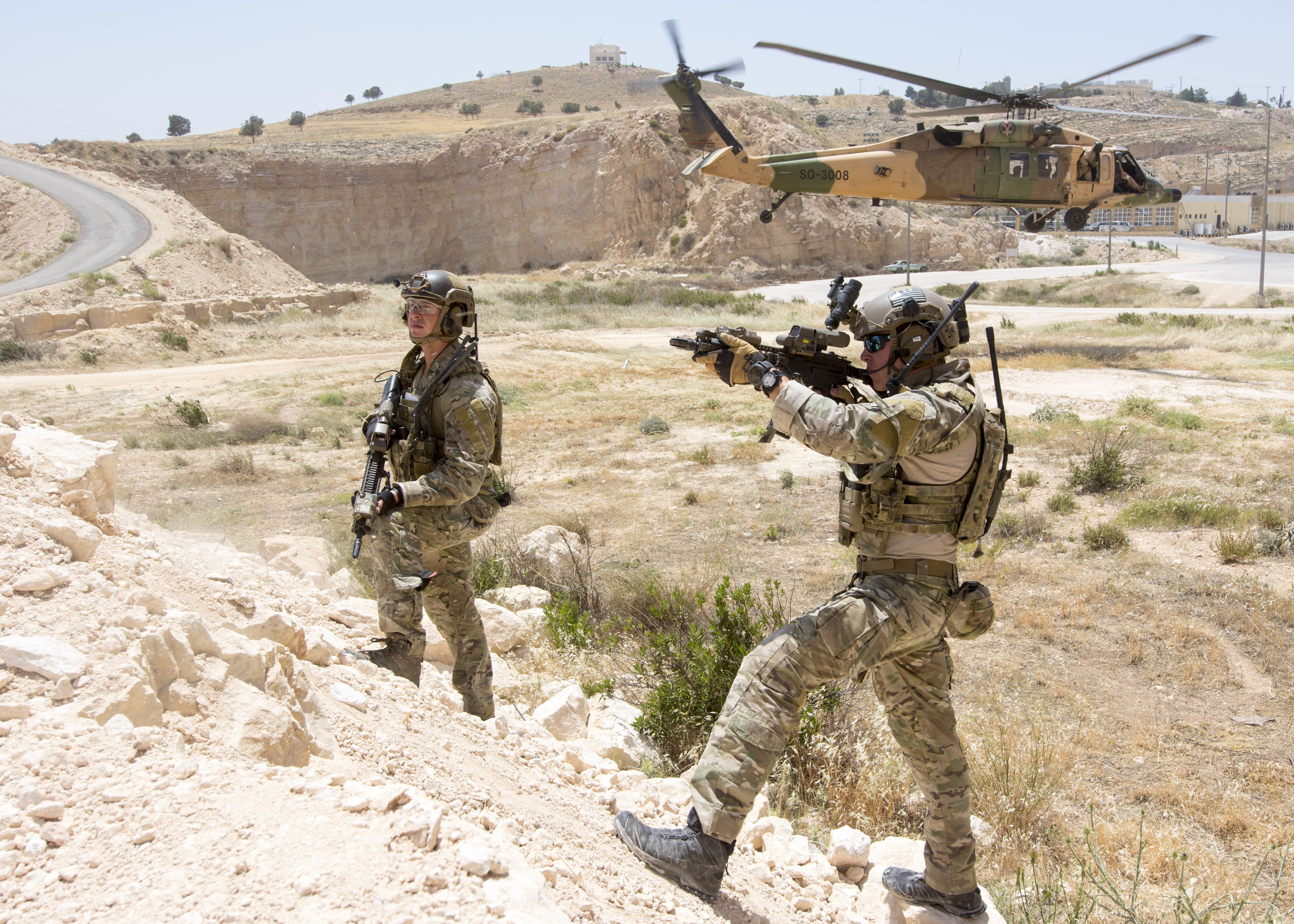
U.S. Air Force Special Tactics Commandos training in Jordan in May 2017

In 2010, special operations forces were deployed in 75 countries, compared with about 60 at the beginning of 2009. In 2011, SOC spokesman Colonel Tim Nye (Army) was reported to have said that the number of countries with SOC presence will likely reach 120 and that joint training exercises will have been carried out in most or all of those countries during the year. One study identified joint-training exercises in Belize, Brazil, Bulgaria, Burkina Faso, Germany, Indonesia, Mali, Norway, Panama, and Poland in 2010 and also, through mid-year 2011, in the Dominican Republic, Jordan, Romania, Senegal, South Korea, and Thailand, among other nations. In addition, SOC forces executed the high-profile killing of Osama bin Laden in Pakistan in 2011.

In November 2009, The Nation reported on a covert JSOC/Blackwater anti-terrorist operation in Pakistan.

In 2010, White House counterterrorism director John O. Brennan said that the United States "will not merely respond after the fact" of a terrorist attack but will "take the fight to al-Qaeda and its extremist affiliates whether they plot and train in Afghanistan, Pakistan, Yemen, Somalia and beyond." Olson said, "In some places, in deference to host-country sensitivities, we are lower in profile. In every place, Special Operations forces activities are coordinated with the U.S. ambassador and are under the operational control of the four-star regional commander."

The conduct of actions by SOC forces outside of Iraq and Afghan war zones has been the subject of internal U.S. debate, including between representatives of the Bush administration, such as John B. Bellinger III, on one hand and the Obama administration on another. The United Nations in 2010 also "questioned the administration's authority under international law to conduct such raids, particularly when they kill innocent civilians. One possible legal justification – the permission of the country in question – is complicated in places such as Pakistan and Yemen, where the governments privately agree but do not publicly acknowledge approving the attacks," as one report put it.

In two decades fighting terrorism, 660 members of the special operation community have been killed and a further 2,738 were wounded.

== Subordinate commands ==
=== Joint Special Operations Command ===
The Joint Special Operations Command insignia

Joint Special Operations Command (JSOC) is a component command of the USSOCOM and is charged to study special operations requirements and techniques to ensure interoperability and equipment standardization, plan and conduct special operations exercises and training, and develop Joint Special Operations Tactics. It was established in 1980 on the recommendation of Col. Charlie Beckwith, in the aftermath of the failure of Operation Eagle Claw.

Units

- The U.S. Army's 1st Special Forces Operational Detachment-Delta, popularly known as Delta Force, is the first of the two counter-terrorism, special mission units that fall under the Joint Special Operations Command. Modeled after the British Special Air Service, Delta Force is regarded as one of the premier special operations forces in the world. Delta also includes a stringent training and selection process. Delta recruits primarily from the most proficient and highly skilled soldiers of the U.S. Army Special Operations Command, although it encompasses the capability of recruiting throughout the U.S. Armed Forces. Recruits must pass a rigid selection course before beginning training, known as the Operators' Training Course (OTC). Delta has received training from numerous U.S. government agencies and other tiers one SOF and has created a curriculum based on this training and techniques that it has developed. Delta conducts clandestine and covert special operations all over the world. It has the capability to conduct myriad special operations missions but specializes in counter-terrorism and hostage rescue operations.
- The Intelligence Support Activity (ISA, The Activity) is the support branch of JSOC and USSOCOM. Its primary missions are to provide Human Intelligence (HUMINT) and Signal Intelligence (SIGINT) mainly for Delta and DEVGRU's operations. Before the establishing of the Strategic Support Branch in 2001, the ISA required the permission of the CIA to conduct covert operations, which considerably lessened its effectiveness in its support of JSOC operations as a whole.
- The U.S. Navy's Naval Special Warfare Development Group (DEVGRU, SEAL Team Six) is the second of the two counter-terrorism, special mission units that fall under the Joint Special Operations Command. DEVGRU is the U.S. Navy's counterpart to Delta, specializing in maritime counter-terrorism. DEVGRU recruits the most proficient operators from Naval Special Warfare, specifically the U.S. Navy SEALs. Like Delta, DEVGRU can conduct a variety of special operations missions but trains primarily for maritime counter-terrorism and hostage rescue operations. DEVGRU has gained prolific fame in recent years, due to high-profile hostage rescue operations and their role in the killing of Osama Bin Laden.
- The Air Force 24th Special Tactics Squadron (24th STS) is the AFSOC component of JSOC. The 24th STS consists of specially selected AFSOC personnel, including Pararescuemen, Combat Controllers, SOWTs, and TACPs. These special operators usually serve with Delta Force and DEVGRU, because of the convenience of the 24th STS's ability to synchronize and control the different elements of airpower and enhance air operations deep in enemy territory; as well as, in the case of Pararescuemen, providing needed medical assistance.
- The Joint Communications Unit (JCU) is a technical unit of the United States Special Operations Command charged to standardize and ensure interoperability of communication procedures and equipment of the Joint Special Operations Command and its subordinate units. The JCU was activated at Ft. Bragg, NC in 1980, after the failure of Operation Eagle Claw. The JCU has earned the reputation of "DoD's Finest Communicators".

Portions of JSOC units have made up the constantly changing special operations task force, operating in the U.S. Central Command area of operations. The Task Force 11, Task Force 121, Task Force 6-26 and Task Force 145 are creations of the Pentagon's post-11 September campaign against terrorism, and it quickly became the model for how the military would gain intelligence and battle insurgents in the future. Originally known as Task Force 121, it was formed in the summer of 2003 when the military merged two existing Special Operations units, one hunting Osama bin Laden in and around Afghanistan, and the other tracking Sadaam Hussein in Iraq.

=== Special Operations Command – Joint Capabilities ===
Special Operations Command – Joint Capabilities (SOC-JC) was transferred to USSOCOM from the soon-to-be disestablished United States Joint Forces Command in 2011. Its primary mission was to train conventional and SOF commanders and their staffs to support USSOCOM international engagement training requirements, and support the implementation of capability solutions in order to improve strategic and operational Warfighting readiness and joint interoperability. SOC-JC must also be prepared to support the deployed Special Operations Joint Task Force (SOJTF) Headquarters (HQ).

The Government Accountability Office wrote that SOC-JC was disestablished in 2013, and positions were to be zeroed out in 2014.

=== Army Special Operations Command ===
USASOC SSI

On 1 December 1989, the United States Army Special Operations Command (USASOC) activated as the 16th major Army command. These special operations forces have been America's spearhead for unconventional warfare for more than 40 years. USASOC commands such units as the well known Special Forces (SF, or the "Green Berets"), the Rangers, and such relatively unknown units as two psychological operations groups, a special aviation regiment, a civil affairs brigade, and a special sustainment brigade. These are one of the USSOCOM's main weapons for waging unconventional warfare and counter-insurgency. The significance of these units is emphasized as conventional conflicts are becoming less prevalent as insurgent and guerrilla warfare increases.

Name	Headquarters	Structure and purpose
1st Special Forces Command (Airborne)	Fort Bragg, North Carolina	The 1st Special Forces Command (Airborne) manages seven special forces groups—the 1st Special Forces Group (Airborne), 3rd Special Forces Group (Airborne), 5th Special Forces Group (Airborne), 7th Special Forces Group (Airborne), 10th Special Forces Group (Airborne), 19th Special Forces Group (Airborne) (ARNG) and 20th Special Forces Group (Airborne) (ARNG)—that are designed to deploy and execute nine doctrinal missions: unconventional warfare, foreign internal defense, direct action, counter-insurgency, special reconnaissance, counter-terrorism, information operations, counterproliferation of weapon of mass destruction, and security force assistance; each special forces group consists of three to four battalions with a group support company and headquarters company. The command also manages the 4th Psychological Operations Group (Airborne)—tasked to work with foreign nations to induce or reinforce behavior favorable to U.S. objectives; most psychological operations battalions are geographically aligned. The command also manages the 95th Civil Affairs Brigade (Special Operations) (Airborne) which enables military commanders and U.S. ambassadors to achieve national objectives by countering adversary control and improving a partner's control over populations via five geographically focused battalions and the 528th Sustainment Brigade (Special Operations) (Airborne) that provides combat service support, combat medical support, and intelligence via multiple support operations teams and three battalions.
1st Special Forces Operational Detachment-Delta	Fort Bragg, North Carolina	Elite special operations and counter-terrorism unit under the control of Joint Special Operations Command.
75th Ranger Regiment	Fort Benning, Georgia	In addition to a regimental headquarters, a Special Troops Battalion, and a military intelligence battalion, the 75th Ranger Regiment consists of three maneuver battalions of elite airborne infantry specializing in large-scale, joint forcible entry operations while simultaneously executing precision targeting operations raids across the globe. Additional capabilities include special reconnaissance, air assault, and direct-action raids seizing key terrain such as airfields, destroying strategic facilities, and capturing or killing the enemies of the Nation. The Regiment also helps develop the equipment, technologies, training, and readiness that bridge the gap between special operations and conventional combat maneuver organizations.
Army Special Operations Aviation Command (Airborne)	Fort Bragg, North Carolina	The Army Special Operations Aviation Command (Airborne) organizes, mans, trains, resources and equips Army special operations aviation units to provide responsive, special operations aviation support to Army Special Operations Forces (ARSOF) consisting of five units and the 160th Special Operations Aviation Regiment (Airborne).
John F. Kennedy Special Warfare Center and School	Fort Bragg, North Carolina	The SWCS selects and trains Army Special Forces, Civil Affairs and Psychological Operations soldiers consisting of five distinct units and the Directorate of Training and Doctrine: 1st Special Warfare Training Group (Airborne)—which focuses on entry-level training—, 2nd Special Warfare Training Group (Airborne)—which focuses on advanced training—, Special Warfare Medical Group (Airborne)—which is part of the Joint Special Operations Medical Training Center—, Special Forces Warrant Officer Institute, and David K. Thuma Noncommissioned Officers Academy.

Units:

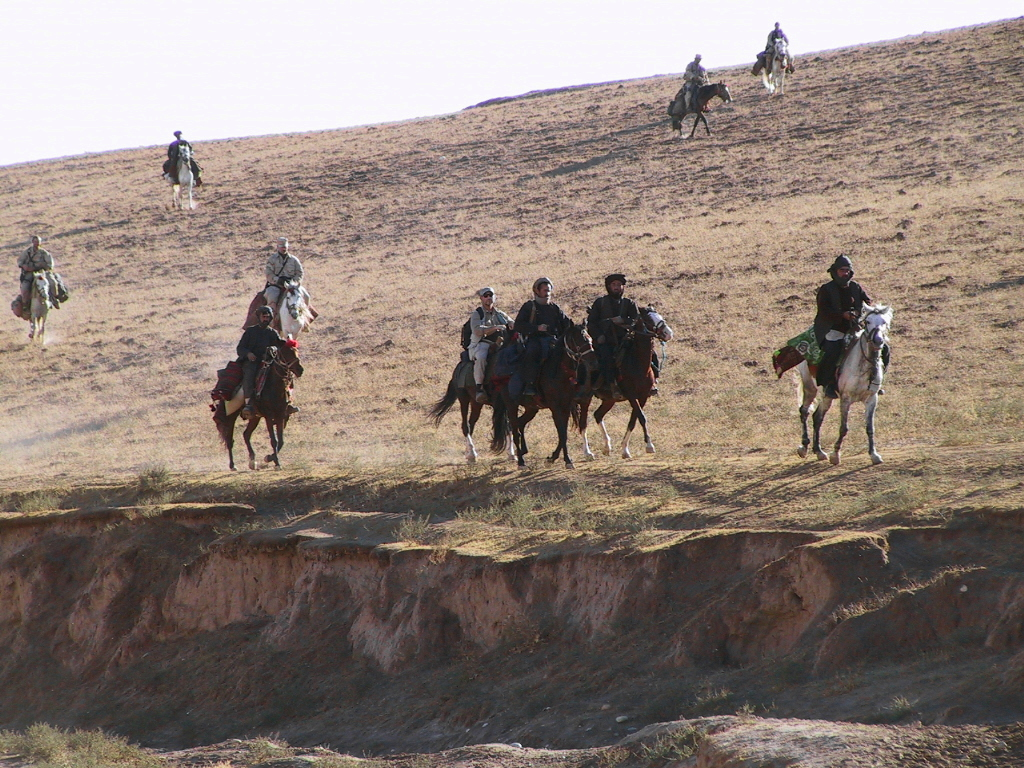
Special Forces soldiers from Task Force Dagger and Commander Abdul Rashid Dostum on horseback in the Dari-a-Souf Valley, Afghanistan, circa October 2001—celebrated in the movie 12 Strong

- United States Army Special Forces (SF) aka Green Berets perform several doctrinal missions: unconventional warfare, foreign internal defense, special reconnaissance, direct action, and counter-terrorism. These missions make Special Forces unique in the U.S. military because they are employed throughout the three stages of the operational continuum: peacetime, conflict, and war. Foreign internal defense operations, SF's main peacetime mission, are designed to help friendly developing nations by working with their military and police forces to improve their technical skills, understanding of human rights issues, and help with humanitarian and civic action projects. Special Forces unconventional warfare capabilities provide a viable military option for a variety of operational taskings that are inappropriate or infeasible for conventional forces. Special Forces are the U.S. military's premiere unconventional warfare force. Foreign internal defense and unconventional warfare missions are the bread and butter of Special Forces soldiers. For this reason, SF candidates are trained extensively in weapons, engineering, communications, and medicine. SF soldiers are taught to be warriors first and teachers second because they must be able to train their team and be able to train their allies during an FID or UW mission. Often SF units are required to perform additional, or collateral, activities outside their primary missions. These collateral activities are coalition warfare/support, combat search and rescue, security assistance, peacekeeping, humanitarian assistance, humanitarian de-mining, and counter-drug operations.
- The 1st Special Forces Operational Detachment-Delta (1st SFOD-D), commonly referred to as Delta Force, Combat Applications Group/"CAG", "The Unit", Army Compartmented Element, or within JSOC as Task Force Green, is an elite Special Mission Unit of the United States Army, under the organization of the USASOC but is controlled by the Joint Special Operations Command (JSOC). It is used for hostage rescue and counterterrorism, as well as direct action and reconnaissance against high-value targets. 1st SFOD-D and its U.S. Navy counterpart, DEVGRU, "SEAL Team 6", perform many of the most highly complex and dangerous missions in the U.S. military. These units are also often referred to as "Tier One" and special mission units by the U.S. government.
- The 75th Ranger Regiment (U.S. Army Rangers) is the premier light-infantry unit of the United States Army and is headquartered at Fort Benning, Georgia. The 75th Ranger Regiment's mission is to plan and conduct special missions in support of U.S. policy and objectives. The Rangers are a flexible and rapid-deployable force. Each battalion can deploy anywhere in the world within 18 hours of notice. The Army places much importance on the 75th Ranger Regiment and its training; it possesses the capabilities to conduct conventional and most special operations missions. Rangers are capable of infiltrating by land, sea, or air and direct action operations such as conducting raids or assaulting buildings or airfields.

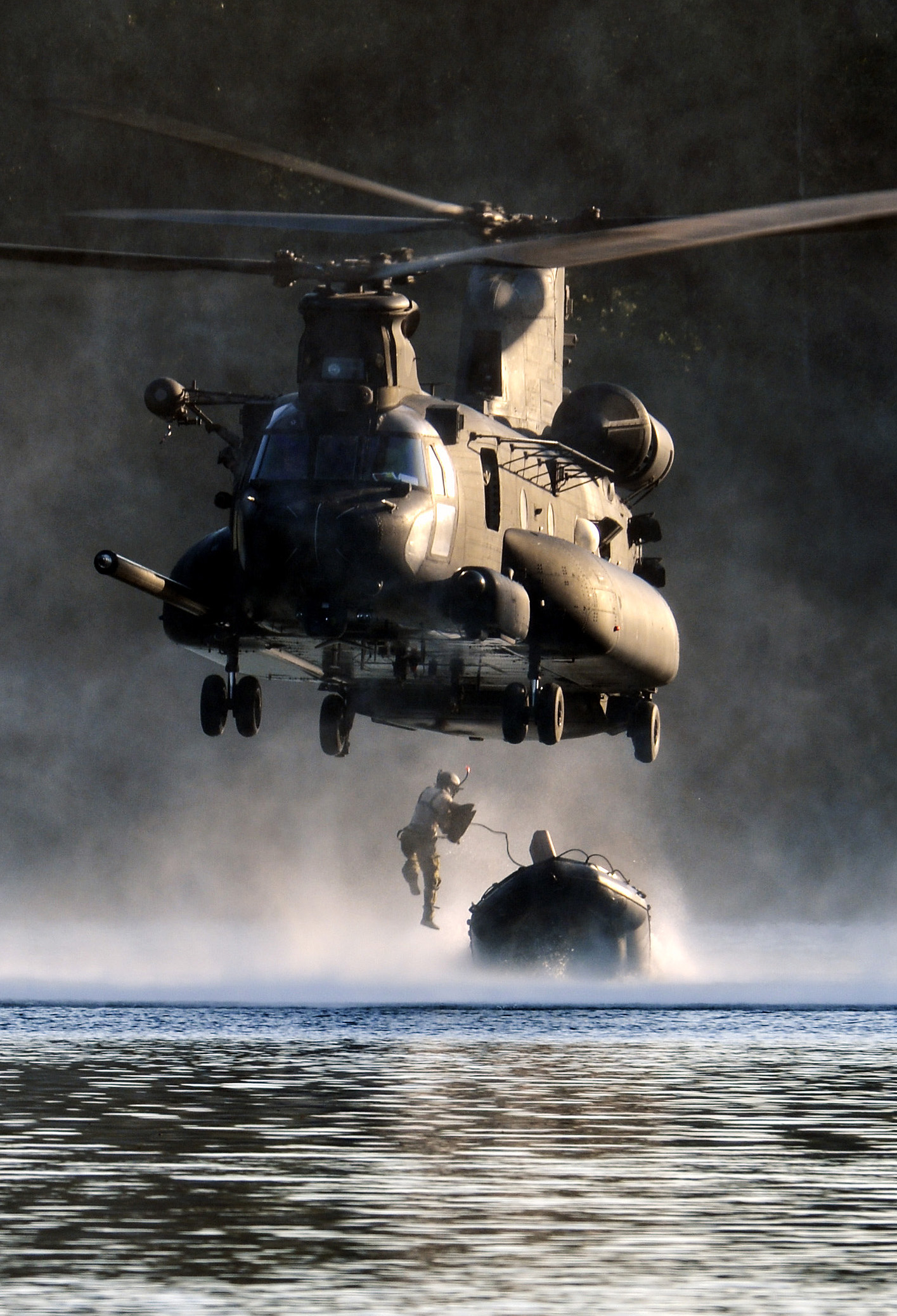
The 22nd STS's Red Team jumps out of an MH-47G Chinook from the 160th SOAR during helocast alternate insertion and extraction training in July 2014

- The 160th Special Operations Aviation Regiment (Night Stalkers) headquartered at Fort Campbell, Kentucky provides aviation support to units within USSOCOM. The Regiment consists of MH-6 and AH-6 light helicopters, MH-60 helicopters and MH-47 heavy assault helicopters. The capabilities of the 160th SOAR (A) have been evolving since the early 1980s. Its focus on night operations resulted in the nickname, "Night Stalkers." The primary mission of the Night Stalkers is to conduct overt or covert infiltration, exfiltration, and resupply of special operations forces across a wide range of environmental conditions.
- 4th Psychological Operations Group (Airborne) and 8th Psychological Operations Group (Airborne) Soldiers use persuasion to influence perceptions and encourage desired behavior. PSYOP soldiers support national objectives at the tactical, operational and strategic levels of operations. Strategic psychological operations advance broad or long-term objectives; global in nature, they may be directed toward large audiences or at key communicators. Operational psychological operations are conducted on a smaller scale. 4th POG(A) is employed by theater commanders to target groups within the theater of operations. 4th POG(A) purpose can range from gaining support for U.S. operations to preparing the battlefield for combat. Tactical psychological operations are more limited, used by commanders to secure immediate and near-term goals. In this environment, these force-enhancing activities serve as a means to lower the morale and efficiency of enemy forces.
- 95th Civil Affairs Brigade (Airborne) specialists identify critical requirements needed by local citizens in war or disaster situations. They also locate civilian resources to support military operations, help minimize civilian interference with operations, support national assistance activities, plan and execute noncombatant evacuation, support counter-drug operations and establish and maintain liaison with civilian aid agencies and other non-governmental organizations. In support of special operations, these culturally oriented, linguistically capable Soldiers may also be tasked to provide functional expertise for foreign internal defense operations, unconventional warfare operations and direct action missions.
- 528th Sustainment Brigade (Special Operations) (Airborne) (SO) (A) supports USASOC. In their respective fields, signal, intelligence, medical, and support soldiers provide communications, focused intelligence, medical Role II support, supplies, maintenance, equipment, and expertise allowing ARSOF to "shoot, move and communicate" on a continuous basis. Because USASOC often uses ARSOF-unique items, soldiers assigned to these units are taught to operate and maintain a vast array of specialized equipment not normally used by their conventional counterparts. The 528th also provides the USASOC with centralized and integrated material management of property, equipment maintenance, logistical automation and repair parts and supplies.
- John F. Kennedy Special Warfare Center (USAJFKSWCS) trains USSOCOM and Army Special Operations Forces through development and evaluation of special operations concepts, doctrines and training.

=== Marine Forces Special Operations Command ===
United States Marine Forces Special Operations Command emblem

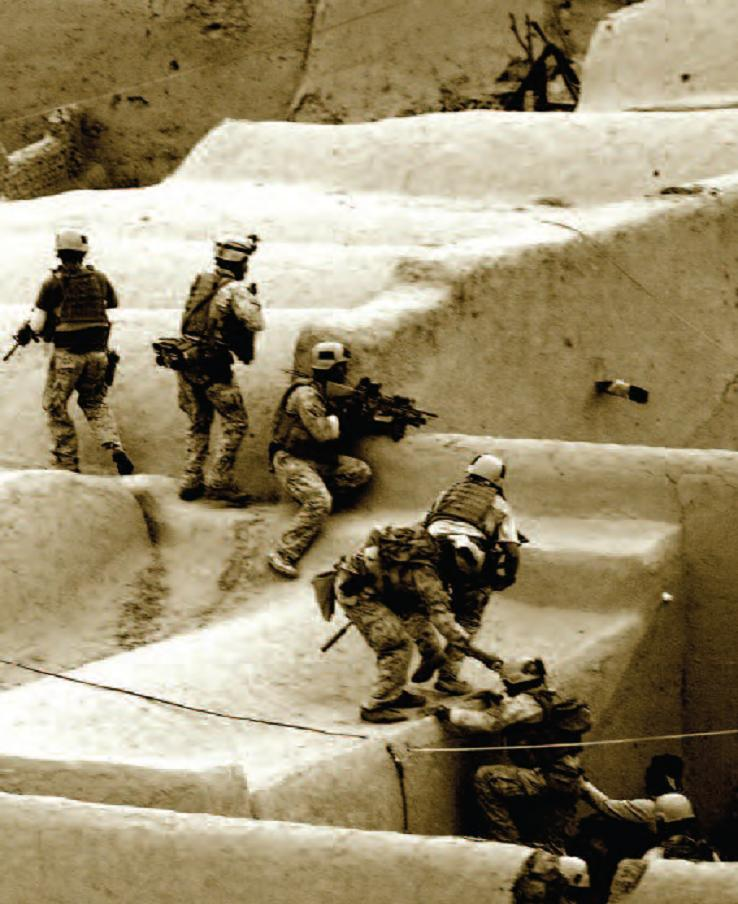
DA/SR Operators from the 1st Marine Special Operations Battalion train in July 2007

In October 2005, the Secretary of Defense directed the formation of United States Marine Forces Special Operations Command (MARSOC), the Marine component of United States Special Operations Command. It was determined that the Marine Corps would initially form a unit of approximately 2,500 to serve with USSOCOM. On 24 February 2006, MARSOC activated at Camp Lejeune, North Carolina. MARSOC initially consisted of a small staff and the Foreign Military Training Unit (FMTU), which had been formed to conduct foreign internal defense. FMTU was later designated as the Marine Special Operations Advisor Group (MSOAG).

As a service component of USSOCOM, MARSOC is tasked by the Commander USSOCOM to train, organize, equip, and deploy responsive U.S. Marine Corps special operations forces worldwide, in support of combatant commanders and other agencies. MARSOC has been directed to conduct foreign internal defense, direct action, and special reconnaissance. MARSOC has also been directed to develop a capability in unconventional warfare, counter-terrorism, and information operations. MARSOC deployed its first units in August 2006, six months after the group's initial activation. MARSOC reached full operational capability in October 2008.

Units

- Marine Raider Regiment (MRR) consists of a Headquarters Company and three Marine Raider Battalions, the 1st, 2nd, and 3rd. The Regiment provides tailored military combat-skills training and advisor support for identified foreign forces in order to enhance their tactical capabilities and to prepare the environment as directed by USSOCOM as well as the capability to form the nucleus of a Joint Special Operations Task Force. Marines and Sailors of the MRR train, advise, and assist friendly host nation forces—including naval and maritime military and paramilitary forces—to enable them to support their governments' internal security and stability, to counter-subvert, and to reduce the risk of violence from internal and external threats. MRR deployments are coordinated by MARSOC, through USSOCOM, in accordance with engagement priorities for Overseas Contingency Operations.
- Marine Raider Support Group (MRSG) trains, equips, structures, and provides specially qualified Marine forces, including, operational logistics, intelligence, Military Working Dogs, Firepower Control Teams, and communications support in order to sustain worldwide special operations missions as directed by Commander, U.S. Marine Forces Special Operations Command (COMMARFORSOC).
- Marine Raider Training Center (MRTC) functions to assess and select personnel for assignment to MARSOC and to train and educate designated personnel in individual, basic, and advanced special operations in order to meet MARSOC's requirement to provide capable personnel to conduct special operations.

=== Naval Special Warfare Command ===
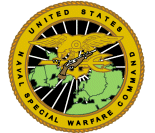
United States Naval Special Warfare Command emblem

The United States Naval Special Warfare Command (NAVSPECWARCOM, NAVSOC, or NSWC) was commissioned 16 April 1987, at Naval Amphibious Base Coronado in San Diego as the Naval component to the United States Special Operations Command. Naval Special Warfare Command provides vision, leadership, doctrinal guidance, resources and oversight to ensure component special operations forces are ready to meet the operational requirements of combatant commanders. Today, SEAL Teams and Special Boat Teams comprise the elite combat units of Naval Special Warfare. These teams are organized, trained, and equipped to conduct a variety of missions to include direct action, special reconnaissance, counter-terrorism, foreign internal defense, unconventional warfare and support psychological and civil affairs operations. Their operators are deployed worldwide in support of National Command Authority objectives, conducting operations with other conventional and special operations forces.

Units

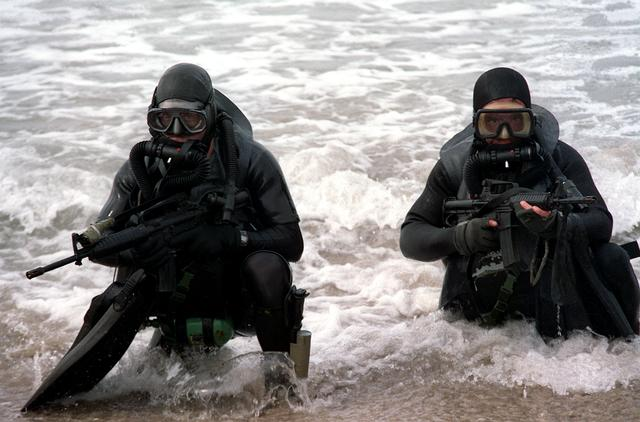
SEALs emerge from the water during a demonstration (c. 2008)

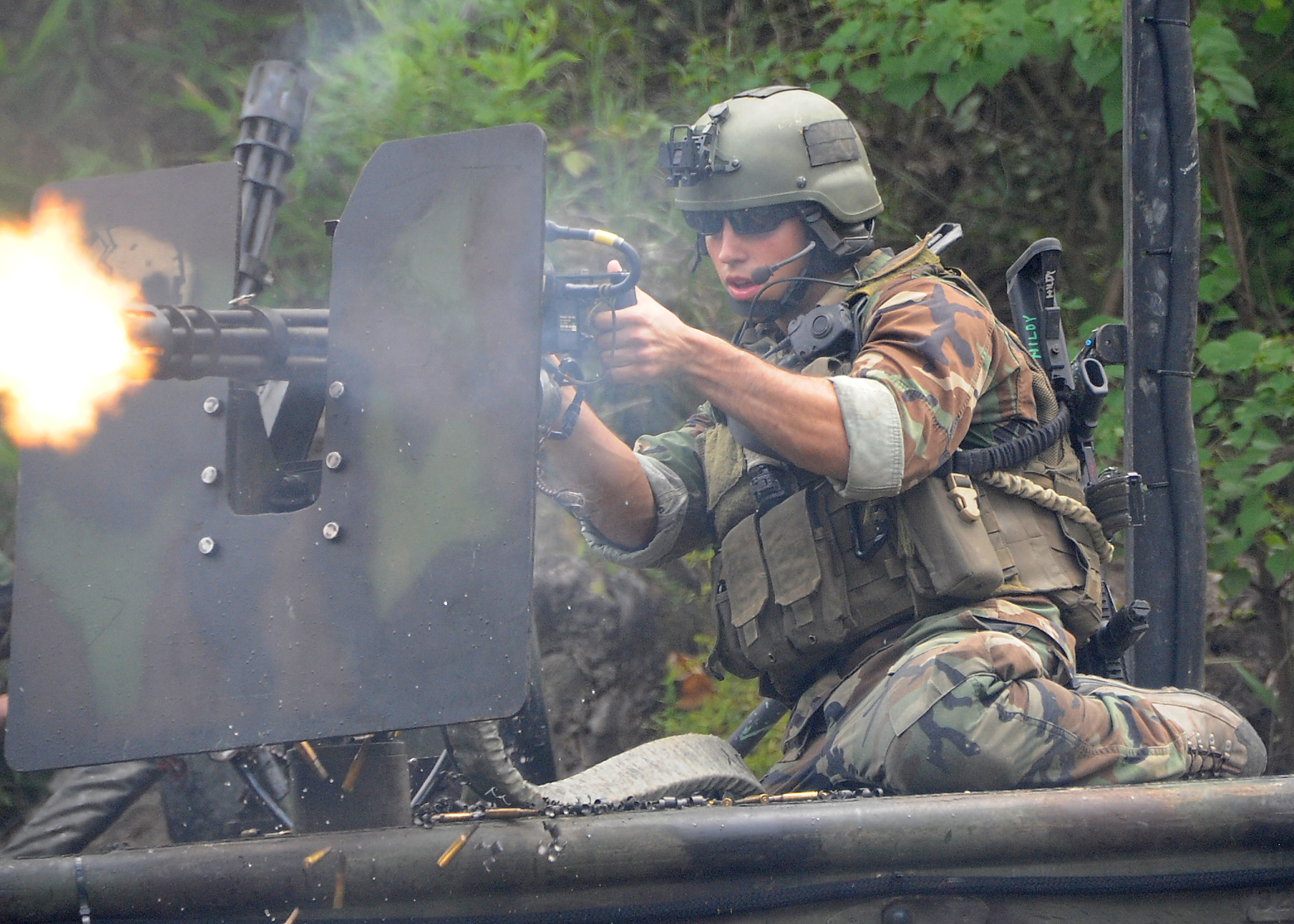
A retired special warfare combatant-craft crewman from Special Boat Team 22 fires a GAU-17 from a Special Operations Craft – Riverine (SOC-R), during filming for Act of Valor (August 2009)

- United States Navy SEALs have distinguished themselves as an individually reliable, collectively disciplined and highly skilled special operations force. The most important trait that distinguishes Navy SEALs from all other military forces is that SEALs are maritime special operations, as they strike from and return to the sea. SEALs (SEa, Air, Land) take their name from the elements in and from which they operate. SEALs are experts in direct action and special reconnaissance missions. Their stealth and clandestine methods of operation allow them to conduct multiple missions against targets that larger forces cannot approach undetected. Because of the dangers inherent in their missions, prospective SEALs go through what is considered by many military experts to be the toughest training regime in the world.
- Naval Special Warfare Development Group (DEVGRU), referred to as SEAL Team Six, the name of its predecessor which was officially disbanded in 1987.
- SEAL Delivery Vehicle Teams are SEAL teams with an added underwater delivery capability who use the SDV MK VIII and the Advanced SEAL Delivery System (ASDS), submersibles that provide NSW with an unprecedented capability that combines the attributes of clandestine underwater mobility and the combat swimmer.
- Special Warfare Combatant-craft Crewmen (SWCC) operate and maintain state-of-the-art vessels and high-tech equipment to conduct coastal patrol and interdiction and support special operations missions. Focusing on infiltration and exfiltration of SEALs and other SOF, SWCCs provide dedicated rapid mobility in shallow water areas where larger ships cannot operate. They also bring to the table a unique SOF capability: Maritime Combatant Craft Aerial Delivery System—the ability to deliver combat craft via parachute drop. Like SEALs, SWCCs must have excellent physical fitness, highly motivated, combat-focused and responsive in high-stress situations.

=== Air Force Special Operations Command ===
Air Force Special Operations Command emblem

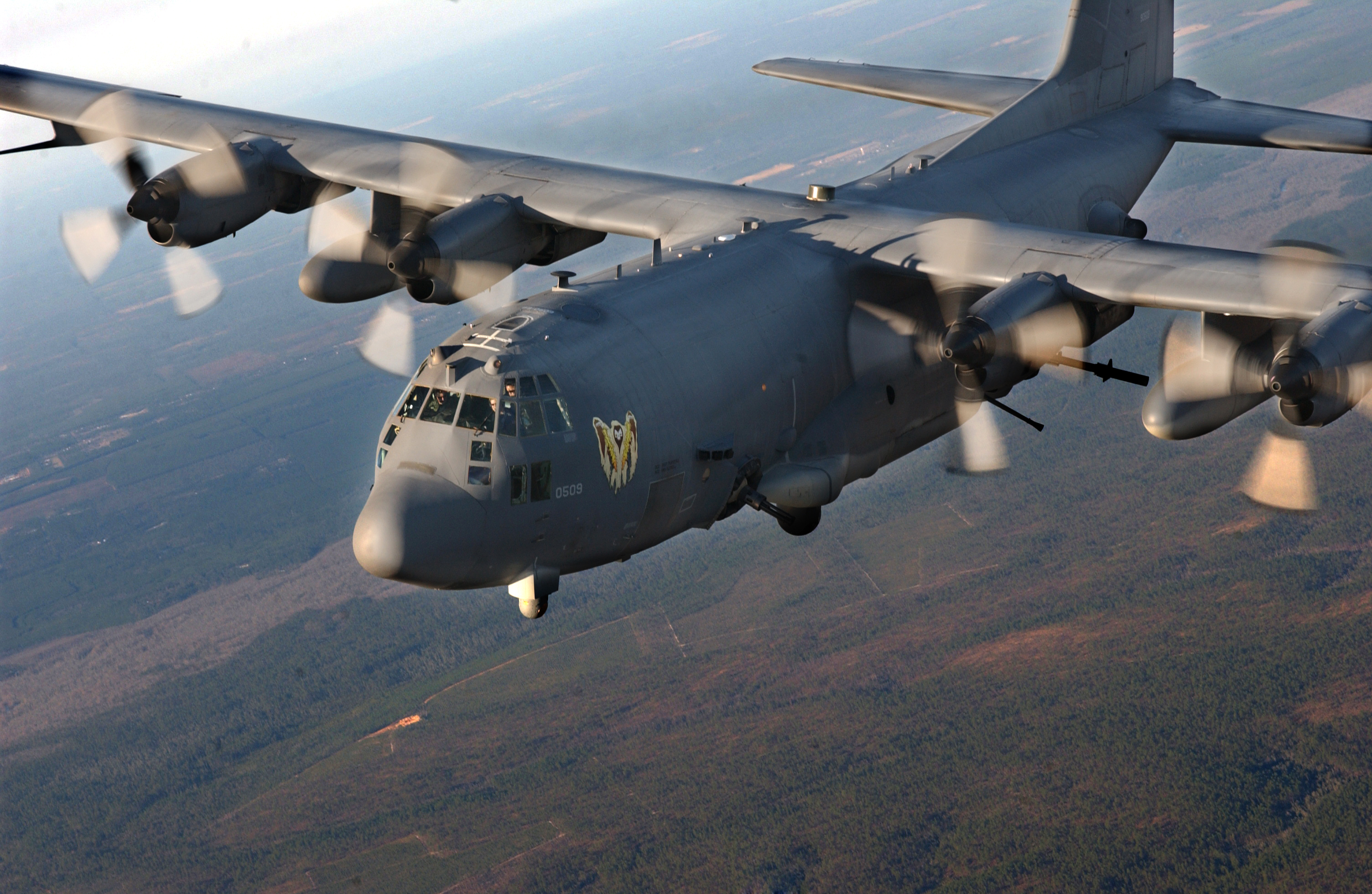
An AC-130U Spooky from the 4th Special Operations Squadron, during training (2006)

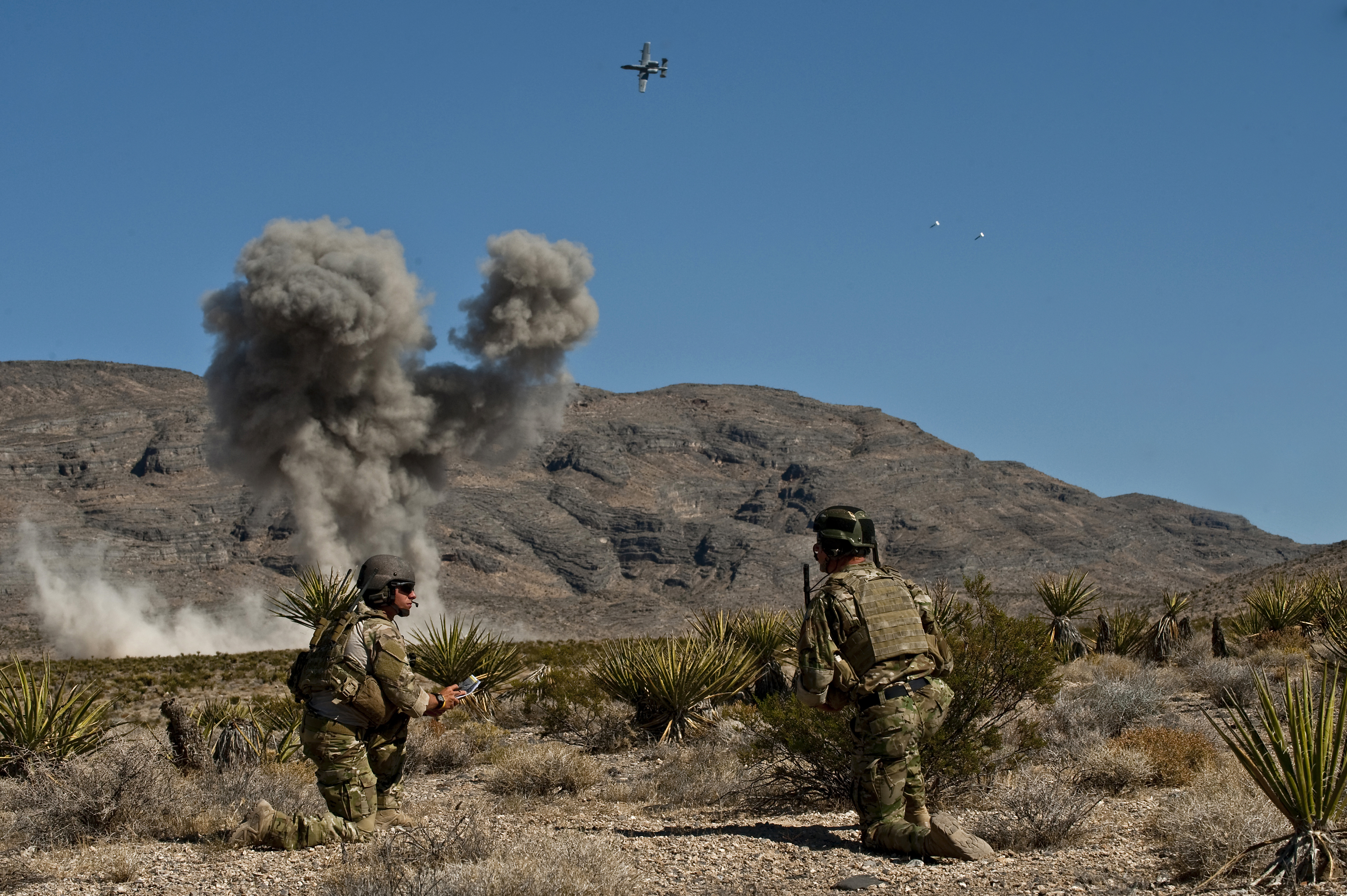
Combat Controllers from the 21st Special Tactics Squadron conducting close air support training with A-10 pilots in Nevada (2011)

Air Force Special Operations Command was established on 22 May 1990, with headquarters at Hurlburt Field, Florida. AFSOC is one of the ten Air Force Major Commands or MAJCOMs, and the Air Force component of United States Special Operations Command. It holds operational and administrative oversight of subordinate special operations wings and groups in the regular Air Force, Air Force Reserve Command and the Air National Guard.

AFSOC provides Air Force special operations forces for worldwide deployment and assignment to regional unified commands. The command's SOF are composed of highly trained, rapidly deployable airmen conducting global special operations missions ranging from the precision application of firepower via airstrikes or close air support, to infiltration, exfiltration, resupply, and refueling of SOF operational elements. AFSOC's unique capabilities include airborne radio and television broadcast for psychological operations, as well as aviation foreign internal defense instructors to provide other governments military expertise for their internal development.

The command's core missions include battlefield air operations; agile combat support; aviation foreign internal defense; information operations; precision aerospace fires; psychological operations; specialized air mobility; specialized refueling; and intelligence, surveillance and reconnaissance.

Components

- Combat Controllers (CCT) are ground combat forces specialized in a traditional pathfinder role while having a heavy emphasis on simultaneous air traffic control, fire support (via airstrikes, close air support and command, control, and communications in covert or austere environments.
- Pararescuemen (PJ) are the only Department of Defense specialty specifically trained and equipped to conduct conventional and unconventional personnel recovery operations. A PJ's primary function is as a personnel recovery specialist with emergency trauma medical capabilities in humanitarian and combat environments.
- Special Reconnaissance (SR) conduct long-range interdiction, surveillance and intelligence gathering. A subset of their responsibilities is to assess and interpret weather and environmental intelligence from forward-deployed locations, working alongside special operations forces.
- Tactical Air Control Party (TACP) provide precision terminal attack control and terminal attack guidance of U.S. and coalition fixed- and rotary-wing close air support aircraft, artillery, and naval gunfire; establish and maintain command and control (C2) communications; and advise ground commanders on the best use of air power.

Organization

- The 1st Special Operations Wing (1 SOW) is located at Hurlburt Field, Florida. Its mission focus is unconventional warfare: counter-terrorism, combat search and rescue, personnel recovery, psychological operations, aviation assistance to developing nations, "deep battlefield" resupply, interdiction, and close air support. The wing's core missions include aerospace surface interface, agile combat support, combat aviation advisory operations, information operations, personnel recovery/recovery operations, precision aerospace fires, psychological operations dissemination, specialized aerospace mobility, and specialized aerial refueling. Among its aircraft is the MC-130 Combat Talon II, a low-level terrain-following special missions transport that can evade radar detection and slip into enemy territory at a 200-foot (61 m) altitude for infiltration/exfiltration missions, even in zero visibility, dropping off or recovering men or supplies with pinpoint accuracy. It also operates the AC-130 Spooky and Spectre gunships that provide highly accurate airborne gunfire for close air support of conventional and special operations forces on the ground.
- The 24th Special Operations Wing (24 SOW) is located at Hurlburt Field, Florida. It is composed of the 720th Special Tactics Group, 724th Special Tactics Group, Special Tactics Training Squadron and 16 recruiting locations across the United States. The Special Tactics Squadrons, under the 720th STG and 724th STG, are made up of Special Tactics Officers, Combat Controllers, Combat Rescue Officers, Pararescuemen, Air Force Special Reconnaissance, Air Liaison Officers, Tactical Air Control Party operators, and a number of combat support airmen which comprise 58 Air Force specialties.
- The 27th Special Operations Wing (27 SOW) is located at Cannon AFB, New Mexico. Its primary mission includes infiltration, exfiltration and re-supply of special operations forces; air refueling of special operations rotary wing and tiltrotor aircraft; and precision fire support. These capabilities support a variety of special operations missions including direct action, unconventional warfare, special reconnaissance, counter-terrorism, personnel recovery, psychological operations and information operations.
- The 193d Special Operations Wing (193 SOW) is an Air National Guard (ANG) unit, operationally gained by AFSOC, and located at Harrisburg International Airport/Air National Guard Station (former Olmsted Air Force Base), Pennsylvania. Under Title 32 USC, the 193 SOW performs state missions for the Governor of Pennsylvania as part of the Pennsylvania Air National Guard. Under Title 10 USC, the 193 SOW is part of the Air Reserve Component (ARC) of the United States Air Force. Its primary wartime and contingency operations mission as an AFSOC-gained unit is psychological operations (PSYOP). The 193 SOW is unique in that it is the only unit in the U.S. Air Force to fly and maintain the Lockheed EC-130J Commando Solo aircraft.
- The 919th Special Operations Wing (919 SOW) is an Air Force Reserve Command (AFRC) unit, operationally gained by AFSOC, and located at Eglin AFB Auxiliary Field #3/Duke Field, Florida. The 919 SOW flies and maintains the MC-130E Combat Talon I and MC-130P Combat Shadow special operations aircraft designed for covert operations.
- The 352d Special Operations Wing (352 SOW) at RAF Mildenhall, United Kingdom serves as the core to the United States European Command's standing Joint Special Operations Air Component headquarters. The squadron provides support for three flying squadrons, one special tactics squadron and one maintenance squadron for exercise, logistics, and war planning; aircrew training; communications; aerial delivery; medical; intelligence; security and force protection; weather; information technologies and transformation support and current operations.
- The 353d Special Operations Group (353 SOG) is the focal point for all U.S. Air Force special operations activities throughout the United States Pacific Command (USPACOM) theater. Headquartered at Kadena AB, Okinawa, Japan the group is prepared to conduct a variety of high-priority, low-visibility missions. Its mission is air support of joint and allied special operations forces in the Pacific. It maintains a worldwide mobility commitment, participates in Pacific theater exercises as directed and supports humanitarian and relief operations.
- The United States Air Force Special Operations School (USAFSOS) at Hurlburt Field, Florida is a primary support unit of the Air Force Special Operations Command. The USAFSOS prepares special operations Airmen to successfully plan, organize, and execute global special operations by providing indoctrination and education for AFSOC, other USSOCOM components, and joint/interagency/ coalition partners.

=== U.S. Space Forces - Special Operations Command ===
U.S. Space Forces Special Operations Command emblem

U.S. Space Forces - Special Operations Command (SPACEFOR-SOC) generates, prepares, and presents specialized Space Force personnel and force packages to U.S. Special Operations Command to integrate space capabilities into special operations.

In July 2023, the United States Space Force assigned Col. Stephan Cummings as the Space Force Element Commander to U.S. Special Operations Command. On October 2026, the Space Force announced the official activation of the U.S. Space Forces Special Operations Command. The activation ceremony is scheduled for November 2, 2026. SPACEFOR-SOC will be under the command of Colonel Peter Norsky.

=== Theater Special Operations Commands ===
Theater Special Operations Commands are tasked with managing Special Operations Forces within their area of responsibility.

- Special Operations Command North
- Special Operations Command South
- Special Operations Command Europe
- Special Operations Command Pacific
  - Special Operations Command Korea
- Special Operations Command Central
- Special Operations Command Africa

=== Other components ===
==== SOF Liaison Element ====
The Special Operations Forces Liaison Element (SOFLE) is small group of special forces personnel, sometimes just one or two at a time, attached to embassies in Africa, Southeast Asia, South America, or elsewhere that terrorists are thought to be operating, planning attacks, raising money or seeking safe haven, especially those teams in the United States. MLEs report to the local US combat commanders and the Special Operations Command (SOCOM), instead of reporting to the local ambassador or CIA station chief.

=== Order of battle ===
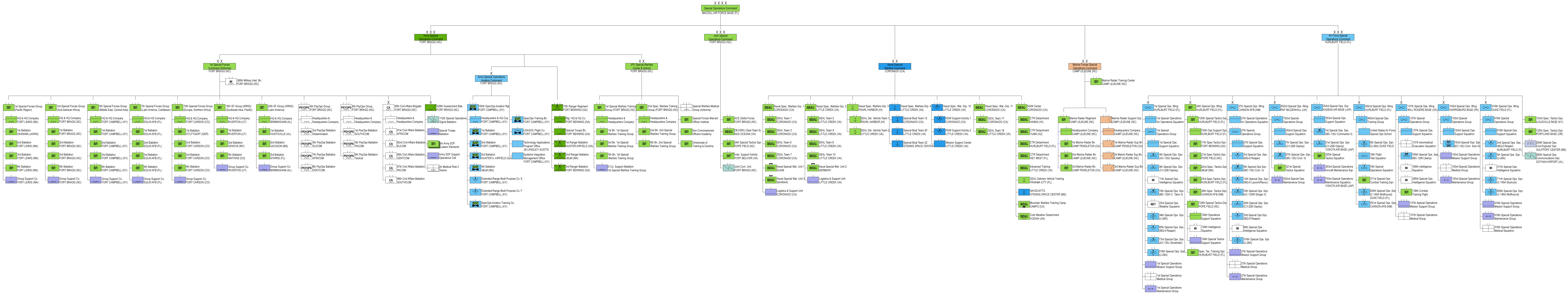
Special Operations Command order of battle April 2020 (click to enlarge)

== List of commanders ==
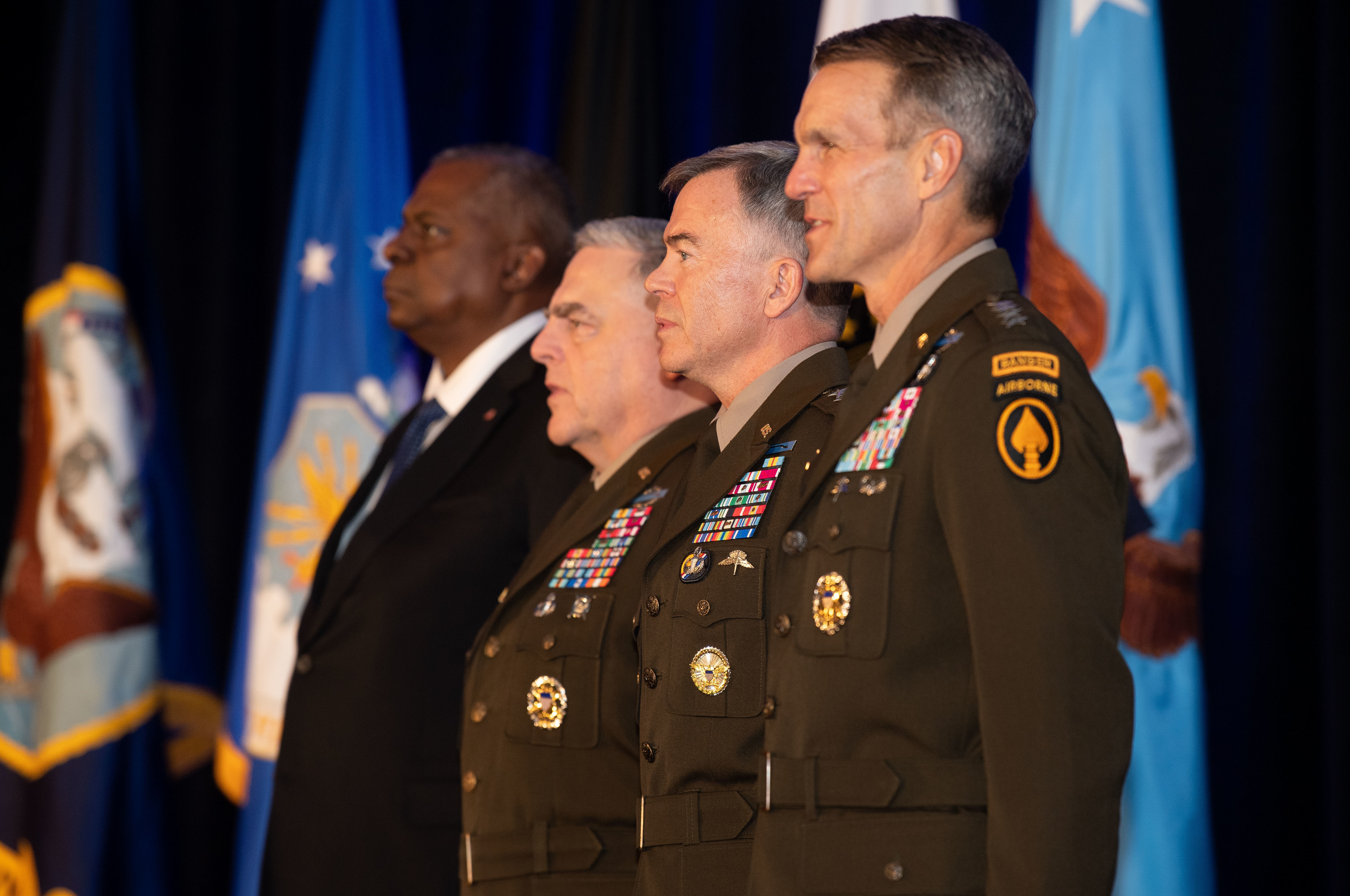
U.S. Secretary of Defense Lloyd Austin (far left), Chairman of the Joint Chiefs of Staff Mark A. Milley (center left), incoming combatant commander Bryan P. Fenton (center right) and outgoing commander Richard D. Clarke Jr. (far right) at the USSOCOM change of command ceremony on 30 August 2022.

The commander of U.S. Special Operations Command is a statutory office (10 U.S.C. § 167), and is held by a four-star general or admiral.

No.	Commander		Term			Service branch
No.	Portrait	Name	Took office	Left office	Term length	Service branch
1	James J. Lindsay	General; James J. Lindsay (1932–2023)	16 April 1987	27 June 1990	3 years, 72 days	U.S. Army
2	Carl W. Stiner	General; Carl W. Stiner (1936–2022)	27 June 1990	20 May 1993	2 years, 327 days	U.S. Army
3	Wayne A. Downing	General; Wayne A. Downing (1940–2007)	20 May 1993	29 February 1996	2 years, 285 days	U.S. Army
4	Henry H. Shelton	General; Henry H. Shelton (born 1942)	29 February 1996	25 September 1997	1 year, 209 days	U.S. Army
-	Raymond C. Smith Jr.	Rear Admiral; Raymond C. Smith Jr. (1943–2022); Acting	25 September 1997	5 November 1997	41 days	U.S. Navy
5	Peter J. Schoomaker	General; Peter J. Schoomaker (born 1946)	5 November 1997	27 October 2000	2 years, 357 days	U.S. Army
6	Charles R. Holland	General; Charles R. Holland (born 1946)	27 October 2000	2 September 2003	2 years, 310 days	U.S. Air Force
7	Bryan D. Brown	General; Bryan D. Brown (born 1948)	2 September 2003	9 July 2007	3 years, 310 days	U.S. Army
8	Eric T. Olson	Admiral; Eric T. Olson (born 1952)	9 July 2007	8 August 2011	4 years, 30 days	U.S. Navy
9	William H. McRaven	Admiral; William H. McRaven (born 1955)	8 August 2011	28 August 2014	3 years, 20 days	U.S. Navy
10	Joseph L. Votel	General; Joseph L. Votel (born 1958)	28 August 2014	30 March 2016	1 year, 215 days	U.S. Army
11	Raymond A. Thomas	General; Raymond A. Thomas (born 1958)	30 March 2016	29 March 2019	2 years, 364 days	U.S. Army
12	Richard D. Clarke	General; Richard D. Clarke (born 1962)	29 March 2019	30 August 2022	3 years, 154 days	U.S. Army
13	Bryan P. Fenton	General; Bryan P. Fenton (born 1965)	30 August 2022	3 October 2025	3 years, 34 days	U.S. Army
14	Frank M. Bradley	Admiral; Frank M. Bradley	3 October 2025	Incumbent	1 year, 33 days	U.S. Navy

== USSOCOM medal ==
USSOCOM Medal Ribbon Bar

The United States Special Operations Command Medal was introduced in 1994 to recognize individuals for outstanding contributions to, and in support of, special operations. Some notable recipients include:

- Lieutenant General Samuel V. Wilson
- Colonel Ralph Puckett
- SCPO Chris Beck

Since it was created, there have been more than 50 recipients, only ten of whom were not American, including;

- General Benoît Puga (France)
- Kaptein Gunnar Sønsteby, 2008 (Norway)
- † Generał broni Włodzimierz Potasiński, 2010 (Poland)
- Generał dywizji Piotr Patalong, 2014 (Poland)
- Generał brygady Jerzy Gut, 2014 (Poland)
- Jungjang (Lieutenant General) Chun In-bum, 2016 (Republic of Korea)
- Counter admiral Nils Johan Holte of Forsvarets spesialstyrker, 2017 (Norway)
- Commander Kåre Karlsen of Marinejegerkommandoen, 2025 (Norway)
- General (Hon.) Prabowo Subianto, 2025 (Indonesia)
- AVM Harvey Reynolds

(† posthumously)
