= Joint Special Operations Command =

Joint component command of USSOCOM

- Emblem of the Joint Special Operations Command
- Founded: 15 December 1980 (45 years, 10 months ago)
- Country: United States
- Type: Sub-unified combatant command
- Role: Special Operations Forces
- Part of: Special Operations Command
- Garrison/HQ: Fort Bragg, North Carolina
- Nicknames: JSOC, Task Force Purple
- Operations: Operation Urgent Fury; Operation Just Cause; Operation Desert Storm; Operation Provide Comfort; Operation Gothic Serpent; Operation Uphold Democracy; Bosnian War; Operation Allied Force; War on terror: Operation Enduring Freedom; Operation Iraqi Freedom; Operation Inherent Resolve; Operation Neptune Spear; Operation Freedom's Sentinel; Operation Kayla Mueller; Operation Southern Spear: 2026 United States intervention in Venezuela
- Website: https://www.socom.mil/Pages/jsoc.aspx

Commanders
- Commander: LTG Jonathan P. Braga, USA
- Deputy Commanding General: Brig Gen Terence G. Taylor, USAF
- Senior Enlisted Advisor: CSM Walter J. Zajkowski, USA

Insignia
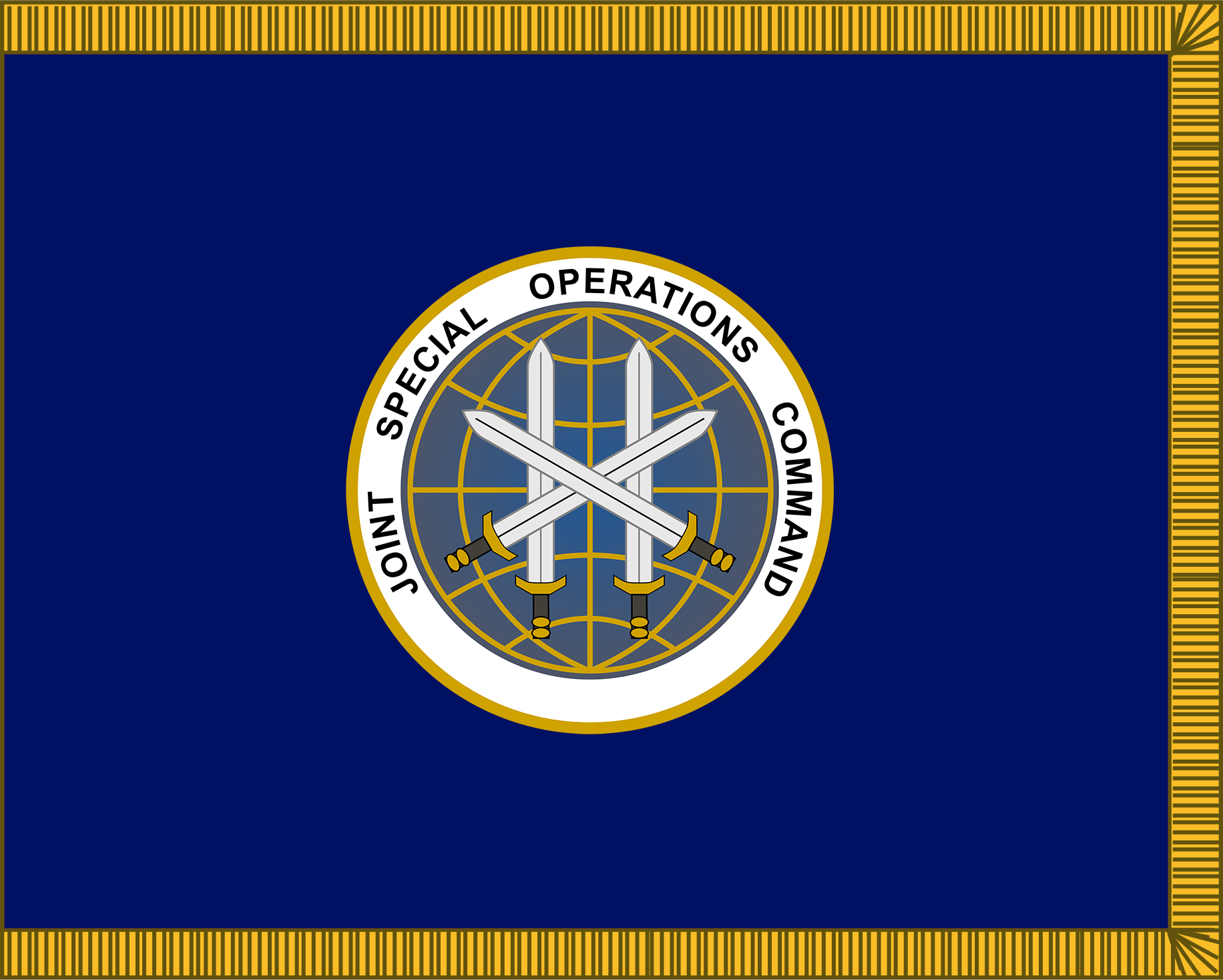
- Joint Special Operations Command Flag

The Joint Special Operations Command (JSOC) is a joint component command of the United States Special Operations Command (USSOCOM) and is charged with studying special operations requirements and techniques to ensure interoperability and equipment standardization, to plan and conduct special operations exercises and training, to develop joint special operations tactics, and to execute special operations missions worldwide. It was established in 1980 on recommendation of Colonel Charlie Beckwith, in the aftermath of the failure of Operation Eagle Claw. It is headquartered at Pope Field (Fort Bragg, North Carolina).

== Overview ==
The JSOC is the "joint headquarters designed to study special operations requirements and techniques; ensure interoperability and equipment standardization; plan and conduct joint special operations exercises and training; develop joint special operations tactics." For this task, the Joint Communications Unit is tasked to ensure compatibility of communications systems and standard operating procedures of the different special operations units.

=== Special Mission Units ===
The Joint Special Operations Command also oversees the special mission units of U.S. Special Operations Command. These are elite special operations forces units that conduct highly classified and complex operations. So far, the following five JSOC units are known, each with an internal task force color code:

- Task Force Green: The Army's 1st Special Forces Operational Detachment-Delta (1st SFOD-D), commonly known as Delta Force.
- Task Force Blue: The Navy's Naval Special Warfare Development Group (DEVGRU), commonly known as SEAL Team Six.
- Task Force White: The Air Force's 24th Special Tactics Squadron (24th STS)
- Task Force Orange: The Army's Intelligence Support Activity (ISA), also known as The Activity and a number of other nicknames and special access program codenames.
- Task Force Red: The 75th Ranger Regiment's subunit the Regimental Reconnaissance Company was placed under the direct command of JSOC in 2004 becoming a special mission unit. The entire regiment is known as Task Force Red when operating under JSOC.

The Intelligence Support Activity's primary role is to act as a deep reconnaissance, intelligence-gathering special mission unit, in support of other combat oriented units within JSOC. Delta Force and DEVGRU are the military's primary counter-terrorism units, eliminating high-value targets and performing hostage rescues are their main roles, along with special reconnaissance and direct action assignments. The 24th Special Tactics Squadron attaches personnel as enablers to these two units such as Combat Controllers to provide air traffic control and fire support, Pararescuemen to provide combat medicine and combat search and rescue, and Tactical Air Control Party specialists to co-ordinate close air support. The Joint Communications Unit provides communications capabilities. Units from the Army's 75th Ranger Regiment and 160th Special Operations Aviation Regiment (Task Force Brown) are controlled by JSOC when deployed as part of JSOC Task Forces such as Task Force 121 and Task Force 145.

JSOC has an operational relationship with the CIA's Special Activities Center (SAC). SAC's Special Operations Group (SOG) often recruits from JSOC SMU personnel.

=== 3rd Operational Support Group ===
JSOC's Security Operations Training Facility is maintained by the 3rd Operational Support Group (3 OSG), which is based at Ft. Bragg. According to Rolling Stone contributing editor Seth Harp, 3 OSG is the same unit commonly referred to as "Delta Force"; however, this was contradicted by a 2016 evaluation of foreign officer involvement at USSOCOM by the DOD Deputy Inspector General for Intelligence and Special Program Assessments which lists 3 OSG and the Combat Applications Group ("CAG", a known identifier for Delta Force) as two separate entities under JSOC.

=== Advanced Force Operations ===
Advanced Force Operations are defined by JP 3–05 as "Operations conducted to refine the location of specific, identified targets and further develop the operational environment for near-term missions." According to Gen. Michael Repass, who conducted it in the Iraq War and was very familiar with its use in Afghanistan, "AFO consists of U.S. Secretary of Defense–approved military operations such as clandestine operations". It is logically part of the Operational Preparation of the Battlespace (OPB), which follows the Intelligence Preparation of the Battlespace, a concept well known in the U.S. and NATO doctrine, OPB is seldom used outside of SOF channels. OPB is defined by the U.S. Special Operations Command as "Non-intelligence activities conducted prior to D-Day, H-Hour, in likely or potential areas of deployment, to train and prepare for follow-on military operations".

In the Iraq War, Gen. Repass, who first commanded the 10th Special Forces Group, took control of a Joint Unconventional Warfare Task Force, which used the 5th and 10th Groups to conduct AFO.

== Security support ==
JSOC has provided domestic law enforcement agencies support during high-profile or high-risk events such as the Olympics, the World Cup, political party conventions, and Presidential inaugurations. Although the use of the military for Local law enforcement purposes in the U.S. is generally prohibited by the Posse Comitatus Act, Title 10 of the U.S. Code expressly allows the Secretary of Defense to make military personnel available to train Federal, State, and local civilian public safety officials in the operation and maintenance of equipment; and to provide such officials with expert advice. Additionally, civilian and military lawyers said provisions in several federal statutes, including the Fiscal Year 2000 Defense Department Authorization Act, Public Law 106-65, permits the secretary of defense to authorize military forces to support civilian agencies, including the Federal Bureau of Investigation, in the event of a national emergency, especially any involving nuclear, chemical, or biological weapons.

In January 2005, a small group of commandos were deployed to support security at the Presidential inauguration. They were allegedly deployed under a secret counter-terrorism program named Power Geyser. The New York Times quoted a senior military official as saying, "They bring unique military and technical capabilities that often are centered around potential WMD events".

== Operational history ==
=== Operation Enduring Freedom – Afghanistan ===
JSOC carried out raids in Afghanistan. The number is not publicly known, but is estimated to be in the hundreds. Several have been documented in the 2013 documentary Dirty Wars by Jeremy Scahill and by other reporting. In one 2010 raid in Gardez, JSOC troops killed one U.S.-trained Police commander and another man, and three women, two of whom were pregnant, who went to the men's aid. Then-JSOC commander William McRaven visited the affected family, offered them a sheep in restitution, and apologized.

=== Operation Iraqi Freedom ===
In May 2003, elements of Task Force 20 (TF 20) remained in Iraq following the invasion and shifted to hunting down high-value former Ba'athist insurgents under direct JSOC command. In July 2003, Task Force 5 (formerly Task Force 11) and Task Force 20 were merged to form Task Force 21, later renamed Task Force 121.

On 11 January 2007, President Bush pledged in a major speech to "seek out and destroy the networks providing advanced weaponry and training to our enemies in Iraq." Sometime in 2007, JSOC started conducting cross-border operations into Iran from southern Iraq with the CIA. These operations included seizing members of Al-Quds, the commando arm of the Iranian Revolutionary Guard, and taking them to Iraq for interrogation, as well as the pursuit, capture or killing of high-value targets in the war on terror. The Bush administration allegedly combined the CIA's intelligence operations and covert action with JSOC clandestine military operations so that Congress would only partially see how the money was spent.

=== Operations in Pakistan ===
According to The Washington Post, JSOC's commander Lieutenant General Stanley McChrystal operated in 2006 on the understanding with Pakistan that US units will not enter Pakistan except under extreme circumstances, and that Pakistan would deny giving them permission if exposed.

According to a November 2009 report in The Nation, JSOC, in tandem with Blackwater/Xe, had a drone program, along with snatch/grab/assassination operations, based in Karachi and conducted in and outside of Pakistan.

In October 2009, leaked diplomatic cables from the U.S. Ambassador to Pakistan, Anne W. Patterson, states the Pakistani Army approved the embedding of U.S. Special Operations Forces, including elements from the Joint Special Operations Command, with the Pakistani military to provide support for operations in the country. This goes beyond the original claims of the U.S. that the only role of the Special Forces was in training the Pakistani military. The leak further revealed that JSOC elements involved in intelligence gathering and surveillance and use of drone UAV technology.

JSOC is credited with coordinating Operation Neptune Spear that killed Osama bin Laden on 2 May 2011.

=== Horn of Africa and Al-Qaeda insurgency in Yemen ===
Operations against al-Qaeda linked terrorists continued in 2009 when on 14 September several U.S. Navy helicopters launched a a raid in Baraawe, Lower Shabelle, Operation Celestial Balance, against Saleh Ali Saleh Nabhan, killing him as well as five other militants. Also in 2009, British Army soldiers from the Special Air Service and the Special Reconnaissance Regiment were deployed to Djibouti as part of Combined Joint Task Force – Horn of Africa to conduct operations against Islamist terrorists in Somalia. They carried out missions focusing on surveillance and targeting of terrorists, alongside their US counterparts, they have also been carrying out this role in Yemen.

JSOC directed a 30 September 2011 air attack that killed Anwar al-Awlaki, an al-Qaeda cleric and Yemeni-American U.S. citizen. After several days of surveillance of Awlaki by the Central Intelligence Agency, armed drones took off from a new, secret American base in the Arabian Peninsula, crossed into northern Yemen and unleashed a barrage of Hellfire missiles at al-Awlaki's vehicle. Samir Khan, a Pakistani-American al-Qaeda member and editor of the jihadist Inspire magazine, also reportedly died in the attack. The combined CIA/JSOC drone strike was the first in Yemen since 2002—there have been others by the military's Special Operations forces—and was part of an effort by the spy agency to duplicate in Yemen the covert war which has been running in Afghanistan and Pakistan.

On 28 October 2013, a drone strike by JSOC on a vehicle near the town of Jilib in Lower Shabelle killed two senior Somali members of Al-Shabaab. Preliminary evidence suggested that one of them was Ibrahim Ali (also known as Anta), an explosives specialist known for his skill in building and using homemade bombs and suicide vests. The US administration has been reluctant to use drone strikes in Somalia. The reluctance partly centered on questions of whether Al-Shabaab—which has not tried to carry out an attack on American soil—could legally be the target of lethal operations by the military or the CIA. In May 2013, the White House announced that it would carry out targeted killing operations only against those who posed a "continuing and imminent threat to the American people." The strike on 28 Oct was the first known American operation resulting in death since that policy was announced and is considered evidence by some observers that views have changed in Washington and that the Obama administration has decided to escalate operations against Al-Shabaab in the aftermath of the group's Westgate shopping mall attack in Nairobi, Kenya, that took place from 21 to 24 September 2013 and which left some 70 people dead. According to The New York Times the Yemen government banned military drone operations after a series of botched drone strikes by JSOC, the last of which was a December 2013 drone strike that killed numerous civilians at a wedding ceremony. Despite a ban on military drone operations, the Yemen government allowed CIA drone operations to continue.

=== Operation Inherent Resolve ===
On 25 March 2016, Special Operations Forces in Syria killed ISIL commander Abu Ala al-Afri.

==== Operation Kayla Mueller ====
On 26 October 2019 U.S. Joint Special Operations Command's (JSOC) Delta Force conducted a raid into the Idlib province of Syria on the border with Turkey that resulted in the death of brahim Awad Ibrahim Ali al-Badri al-Samarrai also known as Abū Bakr al-Baghdadi. The raid was launched based on a CIA Special Activities Center intelligence collection and close target reconnaissance effort that located the leader of ISIS. Launched after midnight local time, the eight helicopters carrying the teams along with support aircraft crossed hundreds of miles of airspace controlled by Iraq, Turkey and Russia. Upon arrival, efforts were made for Baghdadi to surrender, with those efforts unsuccessful U.S. forces responded by blowing a large hole into the side of the compound. After entering, the compound was cleared, with people either surrendering or being shot and killed. The two-hour raid culminated with Baghdadi fleeing from U.S. forces into a dead-end tunnel and detonating a suicide vest, killing himself along with three of his children. The complex operation was conducted during the withdrawal of U.S. forces northeast Syria, adding to the complexity.

Death of Abu Ibrahim al-Hashimi al-Qurashi

On 3 February 2022, U.S. President Joe Biden announced that a raid conducted by Joint Special Operations Command in the city of Atme, Syria in Northwest Syria near the border with Turkey, had killed the second leader of ISIS, Abu Ibrahim al-Hashimi al-Qurashi. After U.S. forces evacuated 10 civilians using an Arabic translator and a bullhorn, al-Qurashi proceeded to detonate a bomb that killed himself and 12 others, many of which were members of his family. After the explosion, the U.S. soldiers entered the compound and had a shootout with the survivors, including a deputy of al-Qurashi, who was then shot and killed by the U.S. forces. The raid lasted nearly two hours and no U.S. forces were killed.

== List of JSOC commanders ==
| No. | Portrait | Rank and Name | Start of Term | End of Term | Defense Branch |
|---|---|---|---|---|---|
| 1 | | MG Richard Scholtes | December 1980 | August 1984 | United States Army |
| 2 | | MG Carl Stiner | August 1984 | January 1987 | United States Army |
| 3 | | MG Gary E. Luck | January 1987 | December 1989 | United States Army |
| 4 | | MG Wayne A. Downing | December 1989 | August 1991 | United States Army |
| 5 | | MG William F. Garrison | 1992 | July 1994 | United States Army |
| 6 | | MG Peter J. Schoomaker | July 1994 | August 1996 | United States Army |
| 7 | | MG Michael A. Canavan | 1 August 1996 | 1 August 1998 | United States Army |
| 8 | | MG Bryan D. Brown | 1998 | 2000 | United States Army |
| 9 | | MG Dell L. Dailey | 2001 | March 2003 | United States Army |
| 10 | | LTG Stanley McChrystal | September 2003 | June 2008 | United States Army |
| 11 | | VADM William H. McRaven | June 2008 | June 2011 | United States Navy |
| 12 | | LTG Joseph Votel | June 2011 | 29 July 2014 | United States Army |
| 13 | | LTG Raymond A. Thomas III | 29 July 2014 | 30 March 2016 | United States Army |
| 14 | | LTG Austin S. Miller | 30 March 2016 | 2 September 2018 | United States Army |
| 15 | | LTG Scott A. Howell | 2 September 2018 | July 2021 | United States Air Force |
| 16 | | LTG Bryan P. Fenton | July 2021 | 10 August 2022 | United States Army |
| 17 | | VADM Frank M. Bradley | 10 August 2022 | 26 September 2025 | United States Navy |
| 18 | | LTG Jonathan P. Braga | 26 September 2025 | Incumbent | United States Army |

== See also ==
- Central Intelligence Agency's Special Activities Center
- Defense Intelligence Agency's Defense Clandestine Service
- Special Operations Forces Command (KSSO) – Russian equivalent command
- Federal Bureau of Investigation's Hostage Rescue Team (HRT) - HRT performs a number of tactical law enforcement and national security functions in high-risk environments and conditions and has deployed overseas, including with JSOC units.
