= Joint Communications Unit =

Unit of the U.S. Joint Special Operations Command

Joint Communications Unit (JCU)
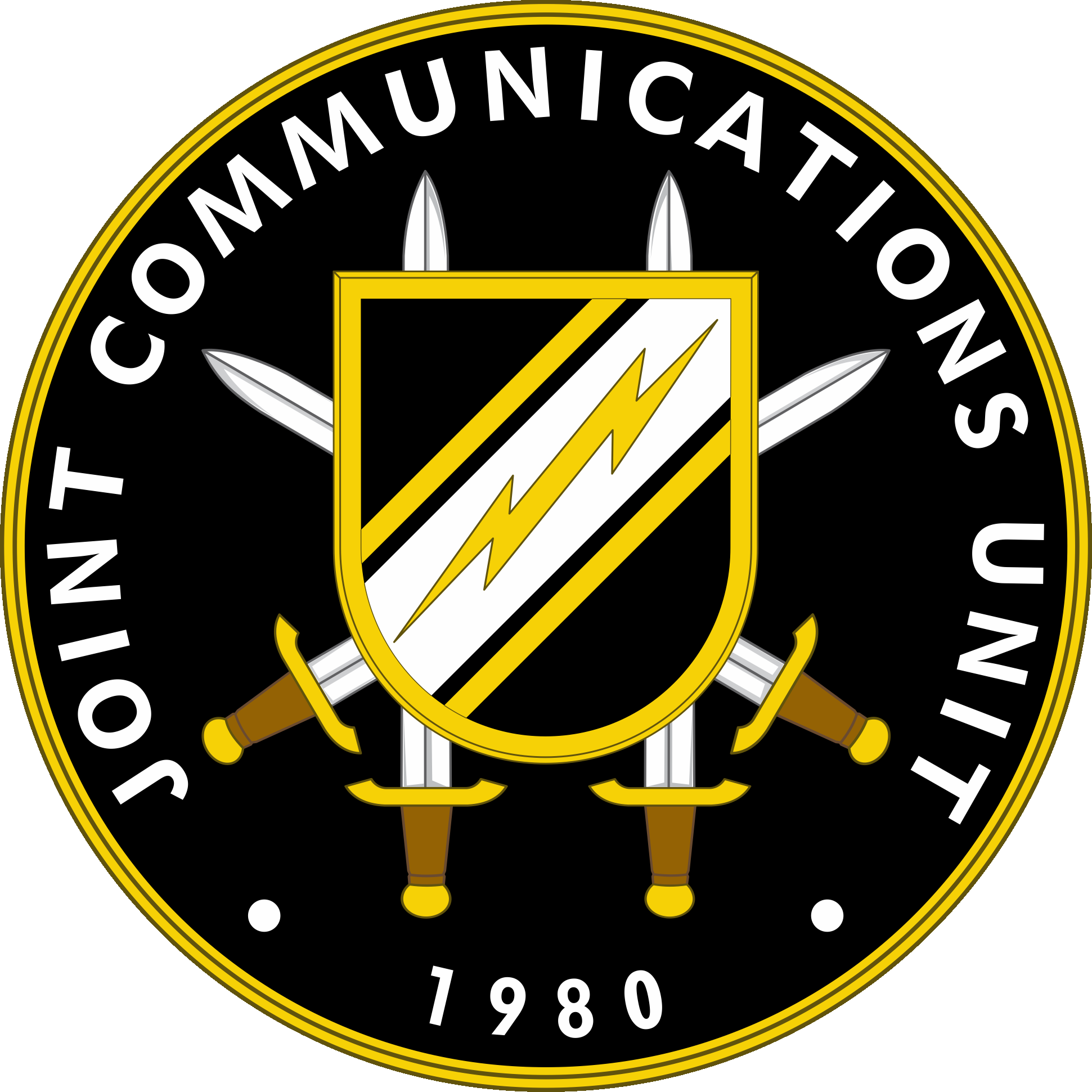
- JCU seal
- Active: 1980–present
- Country: United States of America
- Type: Special Operations
- Role: Communications
- Part of: Joint Special Operations Command; United States Special Operations Command
- Garrison/HQ: Fort Bragg, North Carolina
- Nickname: "DoD's Finest Communicators"

Insignia
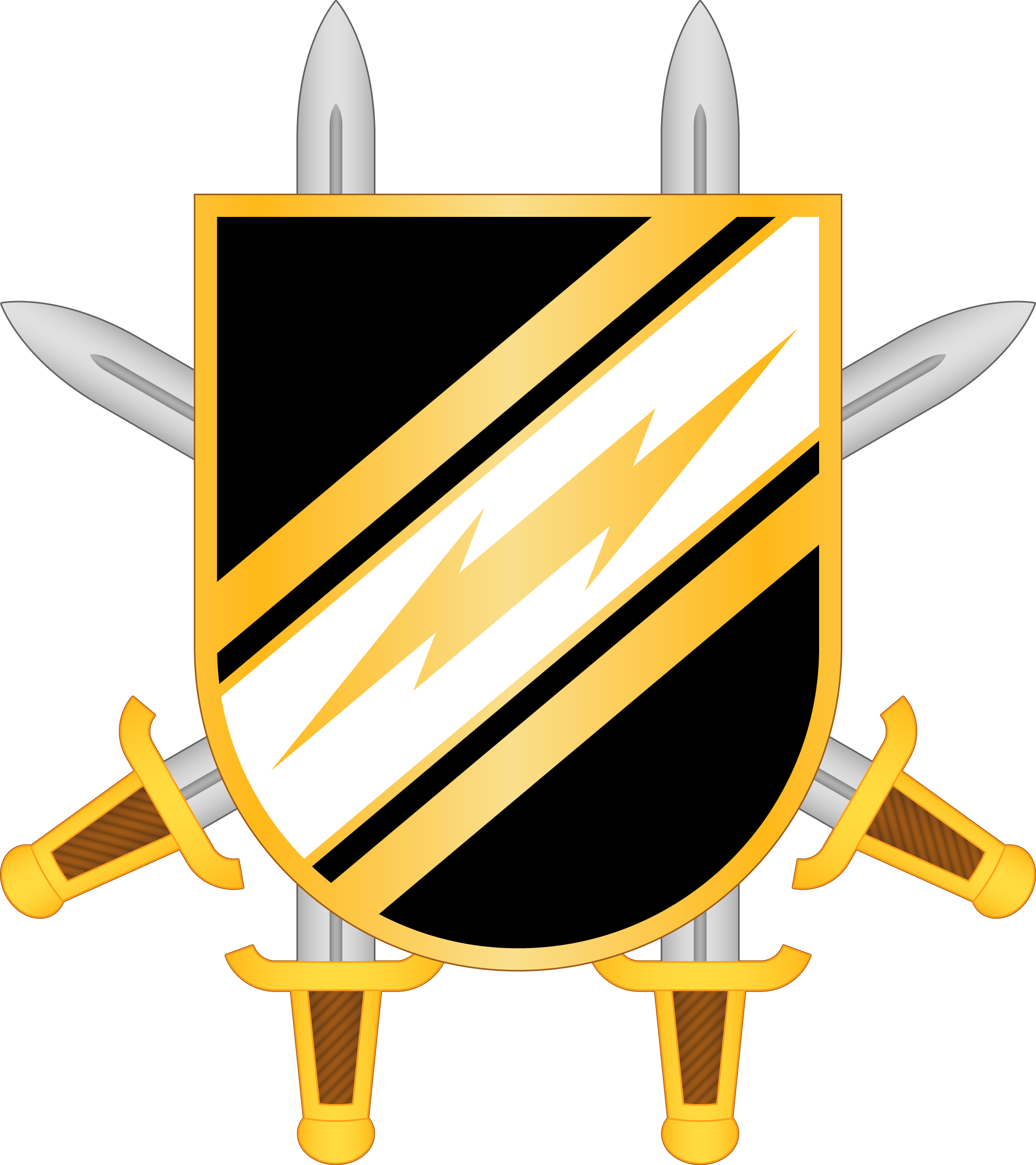
- Distinctive unit insignia of JCU's Army element

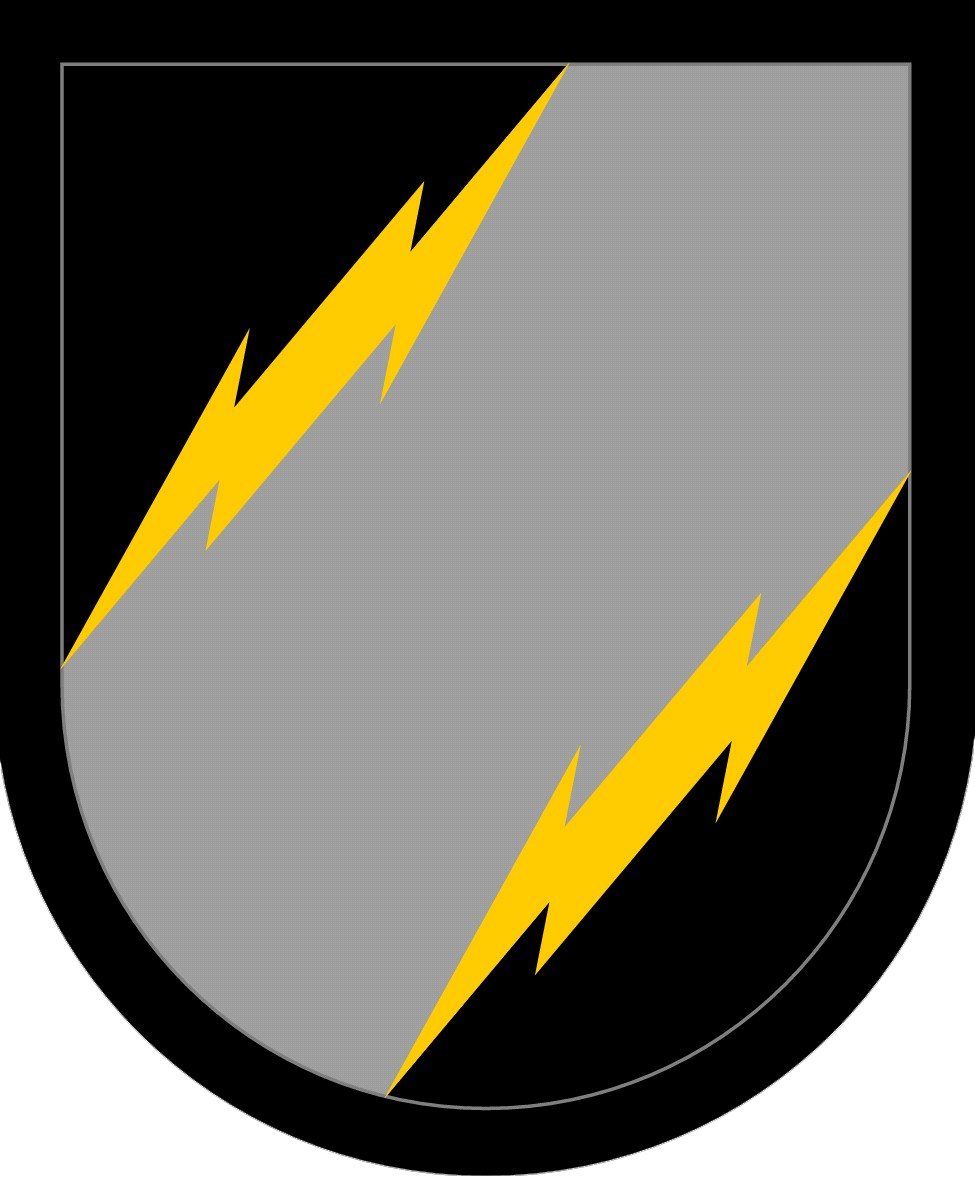
- Beret flash of JCU's Army element

The Joint Communications Unit (JCU) is a unit of the Joint Special Operations Command (JSOC) charged to standardize and ensure interoperability of the communication procedures and equipment of JSOC and its subordinate units. JCU was activated at Ft. Bragg, NC in 1980, after the failure of Operation Eagle Claw. JCU has earned the reputation of "DoD's Finest Communicators".

The JCU prides itself in its ability to conduct operations and exercises on a variety of platforms including, but not limited to ships, aircraft, vehicle and field conditions. The JCU has positions for active duty Army, Air Force, Navy, Marine Corps, and DoD civilian personnel in a variety of communications, automation, electronics maintenance and logistic specialties. Because of the JCU's deployment status, unit personnel receive a wide range of training, including: ultra high frequency and super high frequency satellite systems, local area networks, wide area networks, servers, active directories, networking, voice over IP, videotelephony, video distribution, fiber system installation, and advanced tactical communication scenarios on various air, land, and sea platforms.

JCU recruiting video, circa 2014 (9:57)
