= Milton Sands III =

U.S. Navy admiral, Navy SEAL

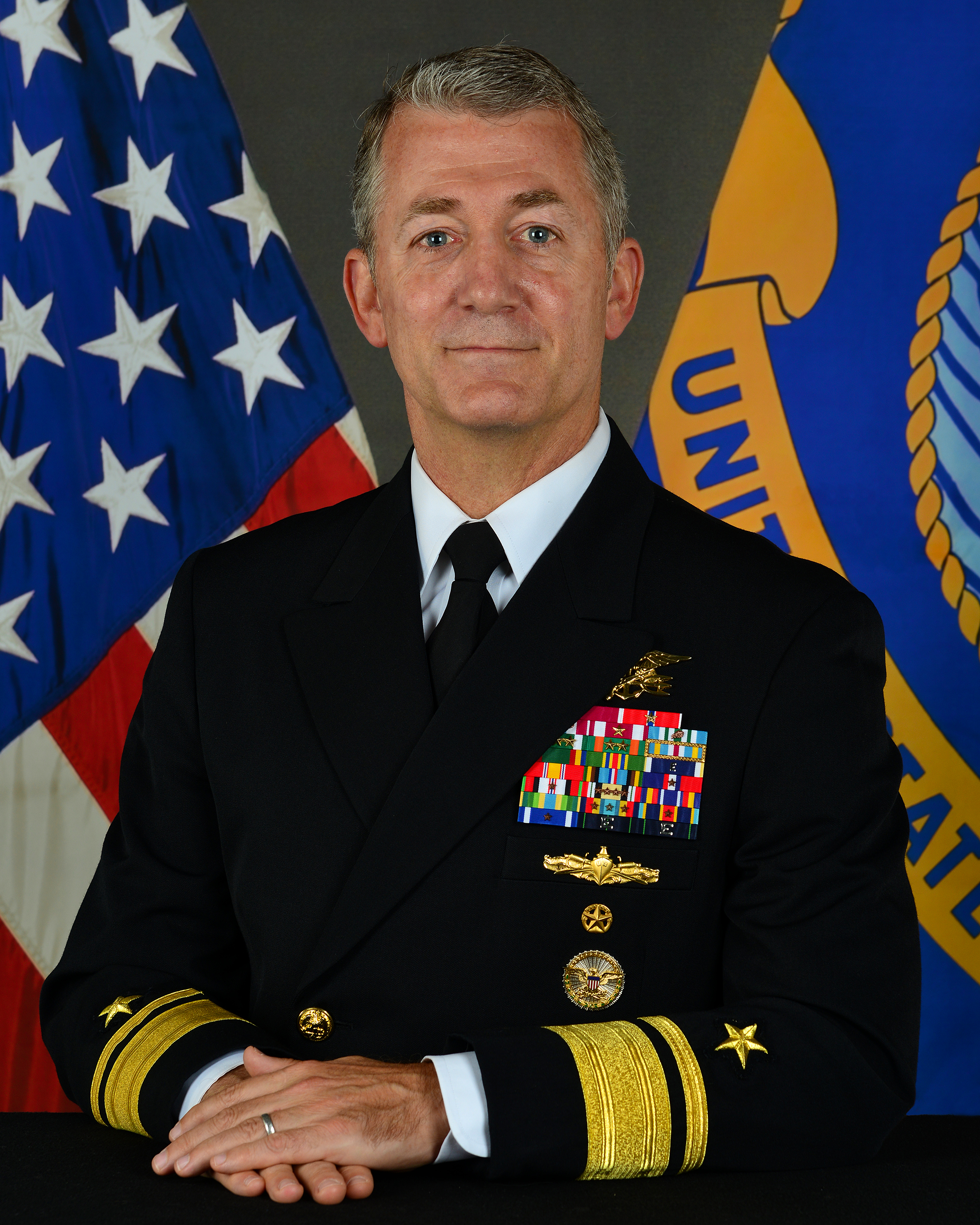
- Born: Farmington, Connecticut, U.S.
- Alma mater: United States Naval Academy (BS); Joint Advanced Warfighting School (MMSP)
- Military career
- Allegiance: United States
- Branch: United States Navy
- Service years: 1992–2025
- Rank: Rear Admiral
- Nickname: Jamie
- Commands: Naval Special Warfare Command; Special Operations Command Africa; Naval Service Training Command; Naval Special Warfare Group 2 SEAL Team 8
- Conflicts: War in Afghanistan
- Awards: Legion of Merit; Bronze Star Medal (2)

Milton James Sands III is a retired United States Navy rear admiral and Navy SEAL who served as commander of the United States Naval Special Warfare Command from 26 July 2024 until his termination on 22 August 2025. He served as the chief of staff of United States Special Operations Command from 2023 to 2024. He served as the commander of Special Operations Command Africa from 2021 to 2023. Prior to that he served as commander of the Naval Service Training Command from 2019 to 2021. Prior to that, he served as vice president of the Joint Special Operations University from 2018 to 2019, with prior tours as commodore of Naval Special Warfare Group 2 from 2016 to 2018 and commander of Seal Team 8.

== Naval career ==
A native of Farmington, Connecticut, Sands graduated from Deerfield Academy in 1988 and the United States Naval Academy in 1992 with a Bachelor of Science in Oceanography and received a commission as an ensign in the United States Navy. He served as a surface warfare officer assignments onboard Newport-class tank landing ship USS Saginaw (LST 1188) and Spruance-class destroyer USS John Rodgers (DD 983). He later volunteered for Basic Underwater Demolition/SEAL training at Naval Amphibious Base Coronado and graduated with BUD/S class 203 in 1995. His first operational assignment was with SEAL Delivery Vehicle Team 1.

Following SEAL Tactical Training (STT) and completion of six month probationary period, he received the 1130 designator as a naval special warfare officer, entitled to wear the Special Warfare insignia also known as "SEAL Trident". He later served with SEAL Team TWO, and assignment to a joint task force in Afghanistan 2002. He later was assigned as commanding officer of SEAL Team EIGHT. He holds a master's degree in military strategy and planning from the Joint Advanced Warfighting School (JAWS).

In March 2024, Sands was assigned as the commander of Naval Special Warfare Command. He was removed from the post on August 22, 2025 on the orders of Secretary of Defense Pete Hegseth.

Military offices
Preceded by ???	Commodore of Naval Special Warfare Group 2; 2016–2018	Succeeded by ???
Preceded by ???	Vice President of the Joint Special Operations University; 2018–2019	Succeeded by Scott M. Guilbeault
Preceded by Michael D. Bernacchi	Commander of Naval Service Training Command; 2019–2021	Succeeded by Jennifer S. Couture
Preceded by Dagvin Anderson	Commander of Special Operations Command Africa; 2021–2023	Succeeded by Ronald A. Foy
Preceded by Marcus S. Evans	Chief of Staff of United States Special Operations Command; 2023–2024	Succeeded by Guillaume N. Beaurpere
Preceded by Keith Davids	Commander of Naval Special Warfare Command; 2024–2025	Succeeded by Walter H. Allman III; Acting
