= Guillaume Beaurpere =

U.S. Army general

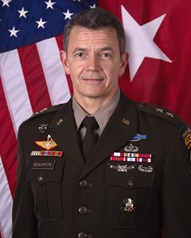
- Official portrait, 2025
- Military career
- Allegiance: United States
- Branch: United States Army
- Service years: 1994–present
- Rank: Major General
- Nickname: Will
- Commands: United States Army Space and Missile Defense Command; Special Operations Joint Task Force-Operation Inherent Resolve; 10th Special Forces Group (Airborne); 1st Special Forces Group (Airborne)

Guillaume N. Beaurpere is a United States Army major general who has served as the chief of staff of United States Special Operations Command since July 2024. He most recently served as commanding general of the United States Army John F. Kennedy Special Warfare Center and School. He was previously the deputy commanding general (operations) of the United States Army Space and Missile Defense Command.

In June 2026 Beaurpere was nominated for promotion to lieutenant general and NSATU commander.

Military offices
Preceded by Joseph A. Ryan	Deputy Commanding General (Support) of the 4th Infantry Division; 2019–2020	Succeeded by Isaac J. Peltier
Preceded by Eric T. Hill	Commanding General of Special Operations Joint Task Force-Operation Inherent Resolve; 2020–2021	Succeeded by Isaac J. Peltier
Preceded by Eric D. Little	Deputy Commanding General (Operations) of the United States Army Space and Missile Defense Command; 2021–2022	Succeeded by Isaac J. Peltier
Preceded by Patrick B. Roberson	Commanding General of the United States Army John F. Kennedy Special Warfare Center and School; 2022–2024	Succeeded by Jason C. Slider
Preceded by Milton Sands III	Chief of Staff of United States Special Operations Command; 2024–present	Incumbent
