= Kenneth Ekman =

Kenneth Ekman may refer to:

- Kenneth Ekman (ice hockey), Swedish ice hockey player
- Kenneth P. Ekman, United States Air Force general
