= Eric Hill (disambiguation) =

Eric Hill (1927–2014) was an English author and illustrator

Eric Hill may also refer to:

- Eric Hill (cricketer) (1923–2010), British cricketer
- Eric R. Hill (active 1954–57), Australian radio-astronomer, see Mills Cross Telescope
- Eric J. Hill (active from 1970), American architect
- Eric Hill (American football) (born 1966), American football linebacker
- Eric T. Hill, United States Air Force general
- Eric Hill, contestant on The Bachelorette (American TV series) season 10

== See also ==
- Erica Hill (Erica Hill-Yount, born Erica Ruth Hill in 1976), American news presenter
- Hill (surname)
- All pages with titles containing "Eric Hill"
