= Dagvin Anderson =

U.S. Air Force general

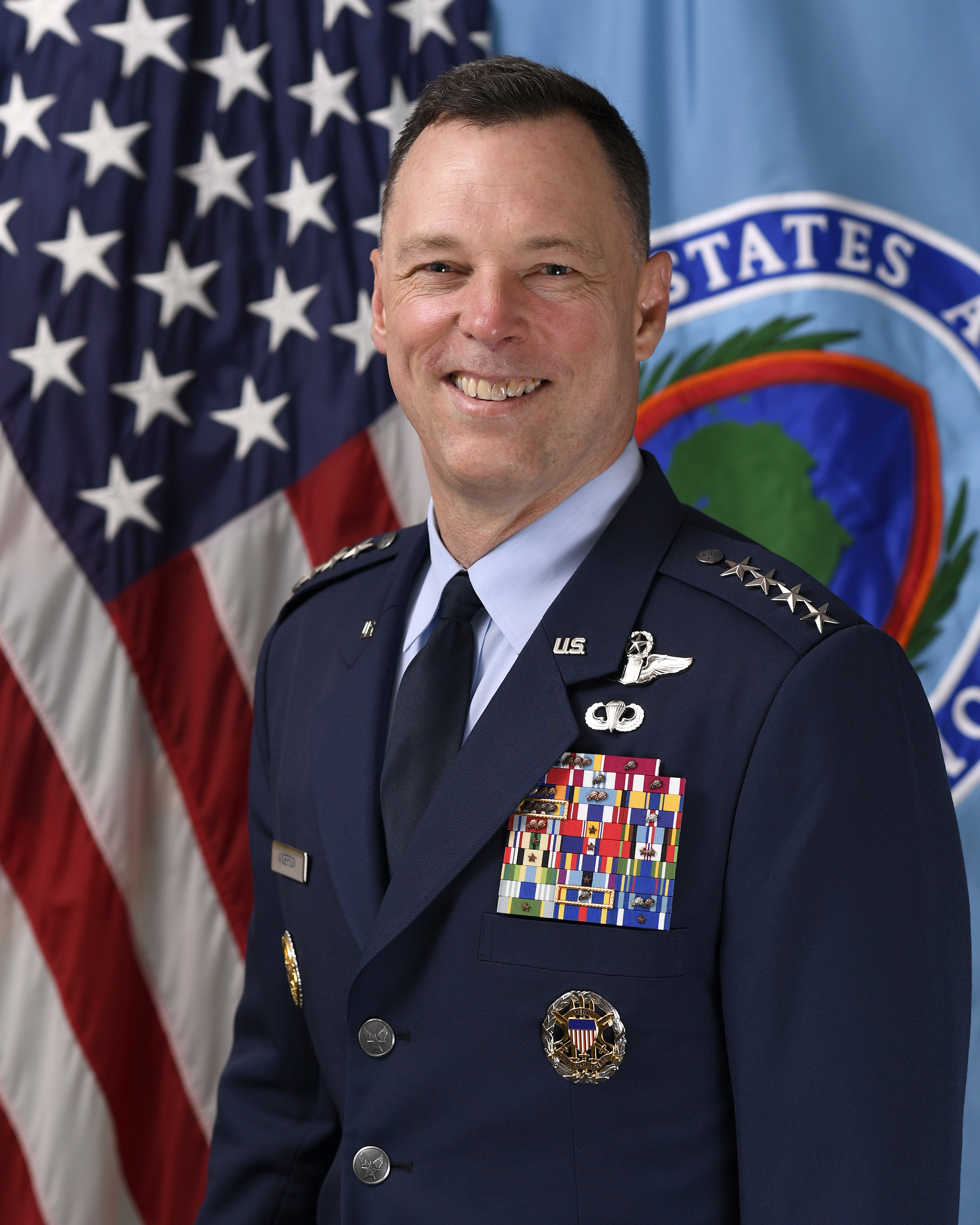
- Official portrait, 2025
- Born: 1970 (age 55–56); Ypsilanti, Michigan, U.S.
- Allegiance: United States
- Branch: United States Air Force
- Service years: 1992–present
- Rank: General
- Commands: United States Africa Command; Special Operations Command Africa; 58th Special Operations Wing; 58th Operations Group; 19th Special Operations Squadron
- Conflicts: War in Afghanistan; Iraq War
- Awards: Defense Superior Service Medal (2); Legion of Merit (2); Bronze Star Medal
- Education: Washington University (BS); Johns Hopkins University (MA)

Dagvin R. M. Anderson (born 1970) is an American general who has served as the commander of the United States Africa Command since 2025. He previously served as director for joint force development of the Joint Staff from 2022 to 2025. Prior to that, he served as the vice director for operations of the Joint Staff from 2021 to 2022. He has also commanded the Special Operations Command Africa from 2019 to 2021. He has achieved the rating of command pilot, with over 3,400 flight hours.

== Early life and education ==
Anderson is a native of Ypsilanti, Michigan. He graduated from the Washington University in St. Louis in 1992, receiving a Bachelor of Science degree in electrical engineering, and his commission from the university's Air Force Reserve Officer Training Corps program.

== Air Force career ==
He received pilot training at the Euro-NATO Joint Jet Pilot Training Program at Sheppard Air Force Base, Texas, from May 1993 to June 1994. Anderson was then a KC-135 pilot in the 91st Air Refueling Squadron from October 1994 to May 1999, and also served as an instructor, evaluator, and chief pilot at different times. In 1997 he completed the Squadron Officer School. He studied the Czech language at the Defense Language Institute in Monterrey, California, from June 1999 to May 2000, and after that was a student and Olmsted Scholar at the Masaryk University in Brno, Czech Republic, until July 2002. Between August 2002 and May 2003, Anderson was a student at the Paul H. Nitze School for Advanced International Studies, Johns Hopkins University, where he obtained a Master's of International Public Policy.

From September 2003 to September 2005 he was chief of current operations at the 8th Special Operations Squadron at Duke Field, Florida. Anderson was then concurrently aide-de-camp to the Commander, U.S. Special Operations Command, at the MacDill Air Force Base, Florida, and was deputy director of the Commander's Action Group, until August 2007. He was the operations officer of 319th Special Operations Squadron at Hurlburt Field, Florida, from October 2007 to April 2009, and then commanded the 19th Special Operations Squadron at the same location until June 2010. Anderson was a fellow at Harvard University's Weatherhead Center for International Affairs from July 2010 to July 2011. He achieved the rating of command pilot, with over 3,400 flight hours on 16 types of aircraft, notably the KC-135, the MC-130E, and U-28A. That includes 738 combat hours.

Anderson was the commander of the 58th Operations Group at Kirtland Air Force Base, New Mexico, from July 2011 to July 2013. He was then the Senior Aviation Advisor for Counter-Terrorism Operations, Office of the Under Secretary of Defense for Policy at The Pentagon, from July 2013 to June 2014. He then commanded the 58th Special Operations Wing at Kirtland Air Force Base from July 2014 to June 2016, before serving as Special Assistant to the Commander and Director of the Commander's Strategic Initiative Group, United States Forces Korea, from July 2016 to June 2017. Anderson was then deputy director of operations of U.S. Indo-Pacific Command at Camp H. M. Smith, Hawaii, until June 2019.

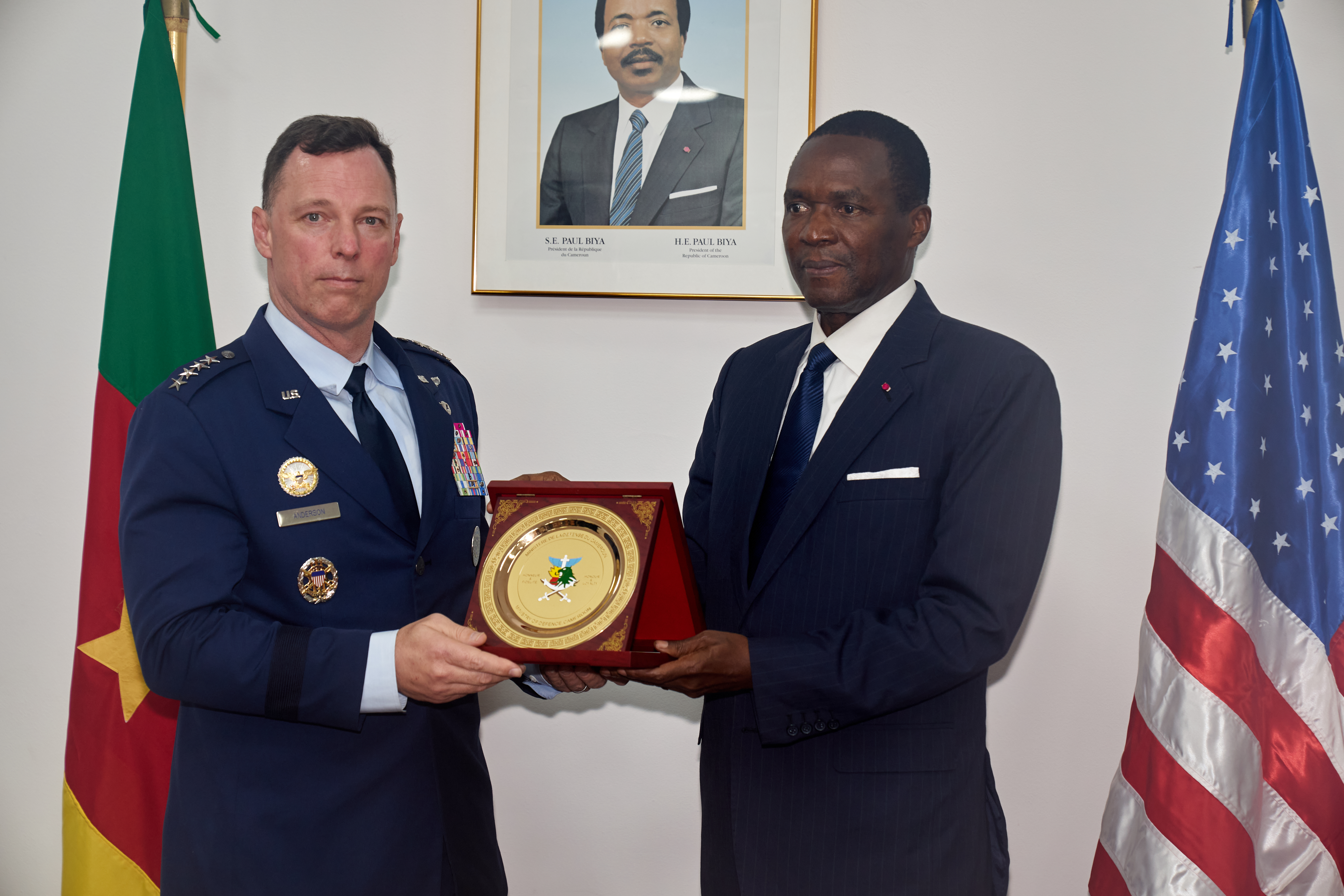
Anderson with Joseph Beti Assomo, Minister of Defense of Cameroon, 18 September 2025.

Anderson was Commander, Special Operations Command Africa, in Stuttgart, Germany, from June 2019 to July 2021. During his tenure, American personnel were killed in Kenya in the Camp Simba attack, an American hostage was rescued in northern Nigeria from local gunmen, and 700 personnel were evacuated from Somalia during Operation Octave Quartz. In May 2021, he was nominated for assignment as vice director for operations of the Joint Staff. In July 2022, Anderson was nominated for promotion to lieutenant general and appointment as director for joint force development of the Joint Staff. He served in that role until August 2025.

=== AFRICOM commander ===
In June 2025, secretary of defense Pete Hegseth announced that Anderson was president Donald Trump's nominee for commander of the United States Africa Command. He assumed command of AFRICOM from General Michael E. Langley on 15 August 2025, becoming the first Air Force officer to lead the command.

== Awards and decorations ==

USAF Command Pilot wings
U.S Army Basic Parachutist Badge
Defense Superior Service Medal w/ 4 bronze oak leaf clusters		Legion of Merit w/ 1 bronze oak leaf cluster
Bronze Star Medal w/ 1 gold oak leaf cluster	Defense Meritorious Service Medal w/ 1 bronze oak leaf cluster	Meritorious Service Medal w/ 1 gold oak leaf cluster
Air Medal w/ 1 silver oak leaf cluster and 2 bronze oak leaf clusters	Aerial Achievement Medal w/ 2 bronze oak leaf clusters	Air and Space Commendation Medal
Joint Meritorious Unit Award w/ 4 oak leaf clusters	Air Force Meritorious Unit	Air and Space Outstanding Unit Award w/ 1 silver oak leaf cluster
Combat Readiness Medal w/ 2 bronze oak leaf clusters	National Defense Service Medal w/ 1 service star	Armed Forces Expeditionary Medal
Southwest Asia Service Medal w/ 1 service star	Kosovo Campaign Medal w/ 1 service star	Afghanistan Campaign Medal w/ 2 service stars
Iraq Campaign Medal w/ 1 service star	Global War on Terrorism Service Medal	Korea Defense Service Medal
Armed Forces Service Medal	Humanitarian Service Medal w/ 1 service star	Nuclear Deterrence Operations Service Medal
Air and Space Overseas Long Tour Service Ribbon	Air Force Expeditionary Service Ribbon w/ 1 oak leaf cluster and gold frame	Air and Space Longevity Service Award w/ 1 silver oak leaf cluster and 1 bronze oak leaf cluster
Small Arms Expert Marksmanship Ribbon with service star	Air Force Training Ribbon	NATO Medal for the Balkans (non-article 5) w/ 1 service star
Joint Chiefs of Staff insignia

== Dates of promotion ==
Rank	Branch	Date
Second lieutenant	Air Force	19 November 1992
First lieutenant	Air Force	19 November 1994
Captain	Air Force	19 November 1996
Major	Air Force	1 May 2003
Lieutenant colonel	Air Force	1 December 2006
Colonel	Air Force	1 October 2010
Brigadier general	Air Force	2 August 2017
Major general	Air Force	22 May 2020
Lieutenant general	Air Force	8 August 2022
General	Air Force	15 August 2025

Military offices
Preceded by Vincent Becklund	Commander of the 58th Special Operations Wing; 2014–2016	Succeeded by Brenda Cartier
Preceded by Corey Martin	Special Assistant to the Commander of the United Nations Command, ROK/US Combined Forces Command, and United States Forces Korea; 2016–2017	Succeeded by Steven G. Edwards
Preceded by Michael Minihan	Deputy Director of Operations of the United States Indo-Pacific Command; 2017–2019	Succeeded by Case Cunningham
Preceded by J. Marcus Hicks	Commander of Special Operations Command Africa; 2019–2021	Succeeded by Milton Sands III
Preceded by Jeff Taliaferro	Vice Director for Operations of the Joint Staff; 2021–2022	Succeeded by Fred Kacher
Preceded by Stuart B. Munsch	Director for Joint Force Development of the Joint Staff; 2022–2025	Succeeded by Stephen Liszewski
Preceded by Michael E. Langley	Commander of the United States Africa Command; 2025–present	Incumbent
