= Ronald A. Foy =

U.S. Navy admiral

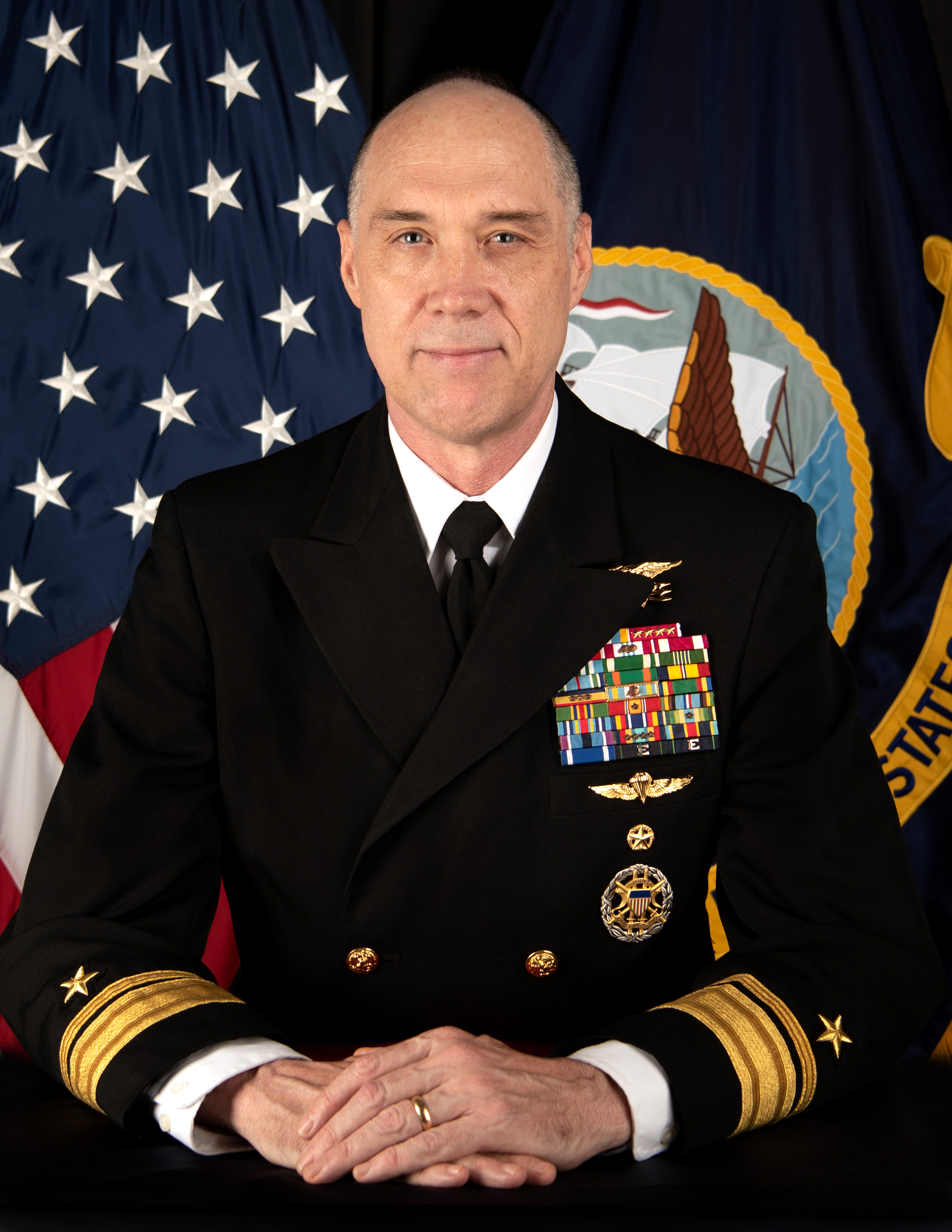
- Official portrait, 2023
- Military career
- Allegiance: United States
- Branch: United States Navy
- Rank: Rear admiral
- Commands: United States Naval Special Warfare Command; Special Operations Command Africa; Naval Special Warfare Development Group
- Conflicts: War in Afghanistan; Iraq War

Ronald A. Foy is a United States Navy rear admiral who commanded the Special Operations Command Africa. In August 2025, he became the director of operations (J3) for the U.S. Cyber Command (USCYBERCOM).

== Military career ==
Foy initially enlisted in the United States Navy. Foy graduated from Auburn University in 1992, receiving his commission as an ensign in the United States Navy via NROTC. He volunteered for and received orders to Basic Underwater Demolition/SEAL training (BUD/S) at Naval Amphibious Base Coronado. After six months of training, Foy graduated with BUD/S class 190 in November 1993. His first operational assignment was with SEAL Team EIGHT. Following SEAL Tactical Training (STT) and completion of a six-month probationary period, he received the 1130 designator as a naval special warfare officer, entitled to wear the Special Warfare insignia also known as "SEAL Trident". Foy completed deployments as assistant platoon commander with a Marine Amphibious Ready Group (MARG/EUCOM) and one deployment as platoon commander on board USS Dwight D. Eisenhower (CVN-69). Foy served with Naval Special Warfare Unit THREE in Bahrain as operations officer and executive officer from 1999 to March 2001. In 2001, Foy volunteered for assignment to Naval Special Warfare Development Group (commonly known as DEVGRU), in Dam Neck, Virginia, and completed a specialized selection and training course. He then served with the command as troop commander, squadron operations officer, executive officer and squadron commander until June 2006, during which time he planned, rehearsed and operated during classified exercises and operations overseas. Foy received assignment as operations officer for Joint Special Operations Command Detachment Washington D.C. at Ft. Belvoir, Virginia, from 2006 to 2008. Foy later attended the Eisenhower School, National Defense University and earned a master's degree in national security studies. Foy later returned to DEVGRU in October 2009 with a second tour as squadron commander, Tactical Development and Evaluation Squadron ONE until 2011. At DEVGRU he also held numerous leadership positions, including chief staff officer, director of operations from 2011 to 2013 and deputy commander from 2013 to 2014. Foy continued to serve numerous staff and command positions, including deputy director of operations at Joint Special Operations Command (JSOC), Fort Bragg from 2014 to 2015; commodore of Naval Special Warfare Group TEN from July 2015 to July 2017; special operations advisor to commander, United States Fleet Forces Command from 2017 to 2018; assistant commander-EAST, Naval Special Warfare Command, from October 2018 to August 2019; deputy commander, Naval Special Warfare Command from 2019 to 2021 and deputy director for global operations, J-39, J-3, Joint Staff from 2021 to 2022. He served as commander, Special Operations Command – Africa from 2023 to 2025.

=== Awards and decorations ===
U.S. military decorations
Defense Superior Service Medal
Legion of Merit with four gold award stars
Bronze Star Medal with Valor device and two gold award stars
Defense Meritorious Service Medal with two bronze oak leaf clusters
Meritorious Service Medal with gold award star
Joint Service Commendation Medal with bronze oak leaf cluster
Navy and Marine Corps Commendation Medal
Army Commendation Medal
Joint Service Achievement Medal
Navy and Marine Corps Achievement Medal
Combat Action Ribbon
Presidential Unit Citation with 3 bronze service stars
Joint Meritorious Unit Award with bronze oak leaf cluster
Navy Unit Commendation
Navy Meritorious Unit Commendation
U.S. Service (Campaign) Medals and Service and Training Ribbons
National Defense Service Medal (with bronze campaign stars)
Armed Forces Expeditionary Medal
Global War on Terrorism Expeditionary Medal
Global War on Terrorism Service Medal
Armed Forces Service Medal with one bronze service star
Humanitarian Service Medal
Navy Sea Service Deployment Ribbon with four bronze service stars
Navy and Marine Corps Overseas Service Ribbon
NATO Medal for Yugoslavia
Navy Expert Rifleman Medal
Navy Expert Pistol Shot Medal

U.S. badges, patches and tabs
Naval Special Warfare Insignia
Navy and Marine Corps Parachutist Insignia
Command at Sea insignia
Office of the Joint Chiefs of Staff Identification Badge
