= Vincent Becklund =

U.S. Air Force general

Vincent K. Becklund
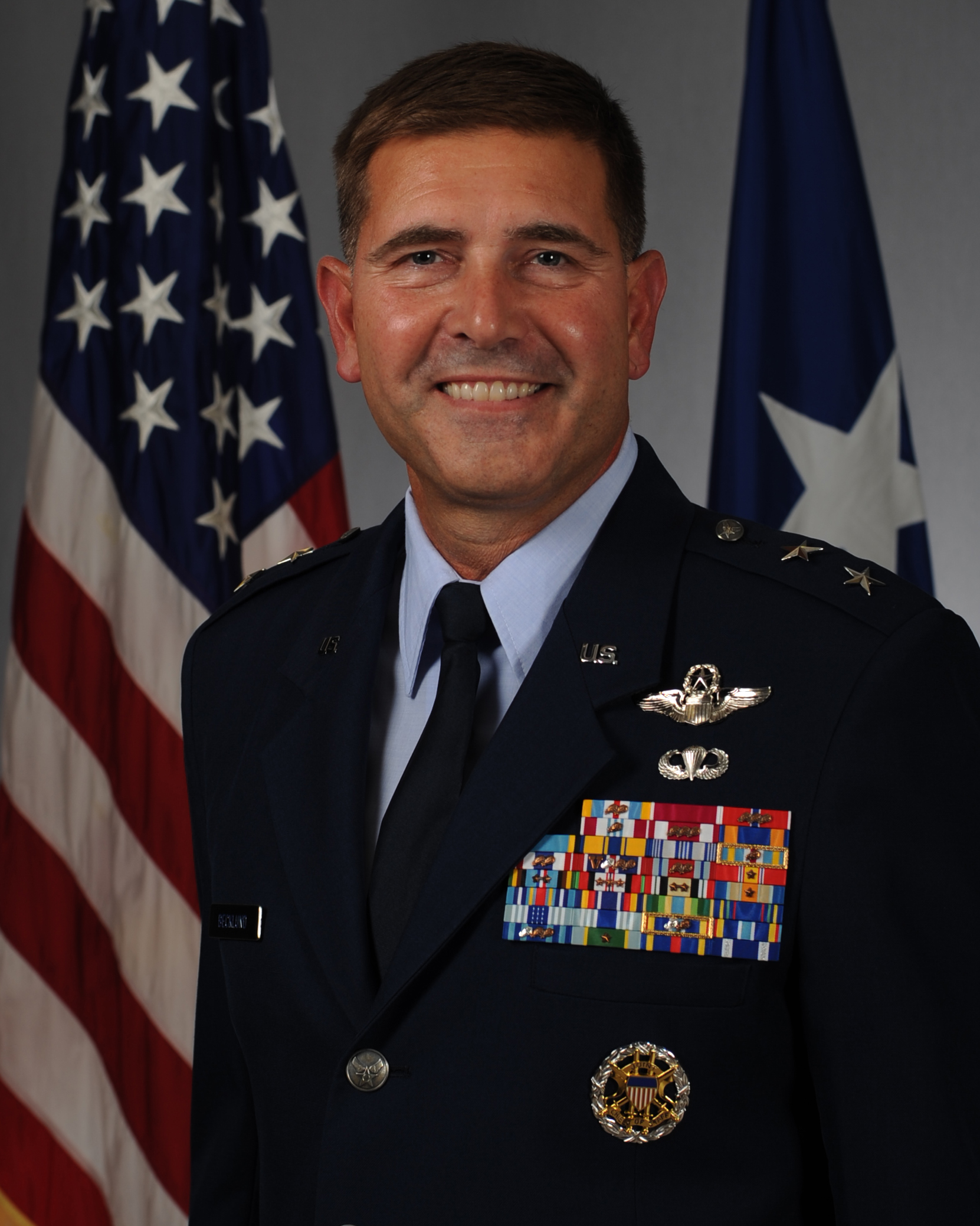
- Military career
- Allegiance: United States
- Branch: United States Air Force
- Service years: 1990–2022
- Rank: Major general
- Commands: NATO Special Operations School; 58th Special Operations Wing; Aviation Tactics Evaluation Group; 20th Special Operations Squadron
- Conflicts: War in Afghanistan; Iraq War; Operation Inherent Resolve
- Awards: Defense Superior Service Medal (3); Legion of Merit; Bronze Star Medal (4)

Vincent K. Becklund is a retired United States Air Force major general who last served as the director of operations of the United States Special Operations Command. Previously, he was as the deputy commander of the Air Force Special Operations Command and, prior to that, the special assistant to the commander of the same major command.

Military offices
Preceded by James L. Cardoso	Commander of the 58th Special Operations Wing; 2012–2014	Succeeded by Dagvin Anderson
Preceded by Brian Killough	Deputy Chief of the Office of Security Cooperation-Iraq; 2016–2017	Succeeded by S. Clinton Hinote
Preceded by ???	Special Assistant to the Commander of the Air Force Special Operations Command; 2017–2018	Succeeded by William G. Holt
Preceded by Michael T. Plehn	Deputy Commander of the Air Force Special Operations Command; 2018–2020	Succeeded by Eric T. Hill
Preceded by James Jarrard	Director of Operations of the United States Special Operations Command; 2020–2022	Succeeded by John W. Brennan
