= Bennet S. Sacolick =

Retired United States Army general

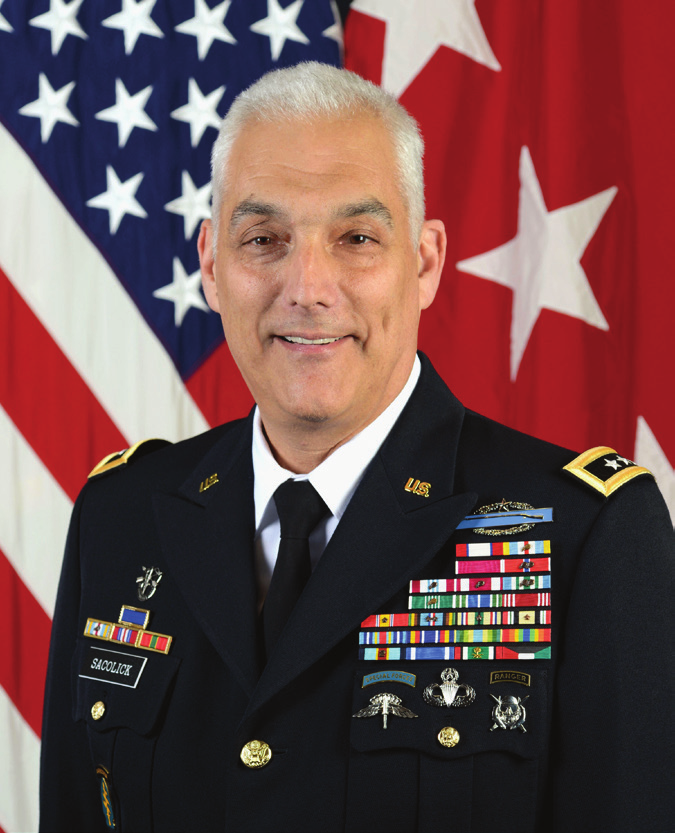
- Sacolick in c. 2016
- Military career
- Allegiance: United States
- Branch: United States Army
- Service years: 1981–2016
- Rank: Lieutenant general
- Commands: Delta Force; John F. Kennedy Special Warfare Center and School; 7th Special Forces Group
- Conflicts: Operation Just Cause; Operation Desert Storm; Battle of Mogadishu; Iraq War; War in Afghanistan
- Awards: Army Distinguished Service Medal; Defense Superior Service Medal (2); Legion of Merit; Bronze Star Medal (3)

Lieutenant General Bennet S. Sacolick, is a retired general officer in the United States Army, former commander of Delta Force and John F. Kennedy Special Warfare Center and School. He has participated in numerous combat operations, such as; Operation Just Cause in 1989, Operation Desert Storm in 1991, Operation Gothic Serpent in 1993 and since 2001 the wars in Iraq and Afghanistan.

== Military career ==
Sacolick enlisted in the United States Army in 1981 and was assigned to the 2nd Battalion, 75th Ranger Regiment prior to attending Officer Candidate School. Sacolick earned his commission in the Infantry Branch in 1982 and was assigned to the Headquarters and Headquarters Company (HHC), 4th Battalion, 325th Infantry Regiment, U.S. Army Southern European Task Force-Italy as a rifle platoon leader. In 1986, after completing the Special Forces Qualification Course, he was assigned to 3rd Battalion, 7th Special Forces Group and participated in combat operations in El Salvador, Peru, Colombia and Panama during Operation Just Cause. In 1990 Sacolick volunteered for and completed a specialized selection course for assignment to the 1st Special Forces Operational Detachment – Delta (1st SFOD-D), commonly known as "Delta Force", based out of Fort Bragg, North Carolina. Following completion of the unit's operators' training course (OTC), Sacolick served as Assistant Operations Officer and Troop Commander, participating in numerous combat operations during Operation Desert Storm in Iraq, Operation Gothic Serpent in Somalia and Operation Joint Endeavor in Bosnia. Sacolick subsequently served as Deputy Operations Officer, Squadron Commander and later as the unit's commander from April 2003 to July 2005. From 2005 to 2008, Sacolick served as Deputy Director for Defense at the Central Intelligence Agency's Counter Terrorism Center, providing liaison and support for the agency's counterterrorism mission in addition to serving as a subject matter expert for Special Operations. Sacolick subsequently assumed command of the John F. Kennedy Special Warfare Center and School in August 2010. From 2012 to 2014, Sacolick was assigned as Director of Force Management and Development for the U.S. Special Operations Command at MacDill Air Force Base. Prior to his retirement in 2016, he served as the director for Strategic Planning at the National Counterterrorism Center.

Sacolick's military education includes graduation from the Infantry Officers Basic Course, Infantry Officers Advanced Course, Special Forces Qualification Course, Defense Language Institute (Spanish) and United States Army Command and General Staff College.

== Awards and decorations ==
Combat Infantryman Badge with Star (denoting 2nd award)
Master Parachutist Badge
Special Forces Tab
Ranger tab
Military Free Fall Parachutist Badge
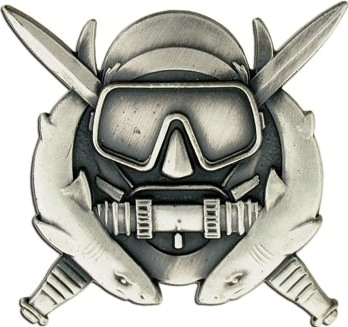
Special Operations Diver Badge
US Army Special Forces Combat Service Identification Badge
Special Forces Distinctive Unit Insignia
6 Overseas Service Bars

Army Distinguished Service Medal
Defense Superior Service Medal with one bronze oak leaf cluster
Legion of Merit
Bronze Star Medal with 2 oak leaf clusters
Defense Meritorious Service Medal with oak leaf cluster
Meritorious Service Medal with oak leaf cluster
Joint Service Commendation Medal with two oak leaf clusters
Army Commendation Medal with oak leaf cluster
Army Achievement Medal
Army Presidential Unit Citation
Joint Meritorious Unit Award with oak leaf cluster
Valorous Unit Award
Army Superior Unit Award
Army Good Conduct Medal
National Defense Service Medal with one bronze service star
Armed Forces Expeditionary Medal with two service stars
Southwest Asia Service Medal with service star
Iraq Campaign Medal with campaign star
Global War on Terrorism Expeditionary Medal
Global War on Terrorism Service Medal
Armed Forces Service Medal
Army Service Ribbon
Army Overseas Service Ribbon with bronze award numeral 2
NATO Medal for the Former Yugoslavia
Kuwait Liberation Medal (Saudi Arabia)
Kuwait Liberation Medal (Kuwait)
