= John F. Kennedy Special Warfare Center and School =

U.S. Army special operations training center

Coordinates: 35.139167°N 78.999167°W

U.S. Army John F. Kennedy Special Warfare Center and School
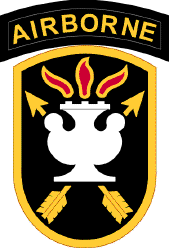
- U.S. Army John F. Kennedy Special Warfare Center and School shoulder sleeve insignia
- Country: United States
- Allegiance: United States Special Operations Command
- Branch: United States Army
- Type: Special operations
- Role: Recruit, assess, select, train and educate the U.S. Army Civil Affairs, Psychological Operations and Special Forces soldiers by providing training, education, doctrine, career management and a force-development capability
- Size: 2,425 personnel authorized: 1,891 military personnel; 534 civilian personnel
- Part of: United States Army Special Operations Command
- Garrison/HQ: Fort Bragg, North Carolina
- Nickname: SWCS
- Mottos: "Veritas et Libertas" (Truth and Freedom)
- Website: https://www.swcs.mil/

Commanders
- Current commander: Major General Jason C. Slider

Insignia
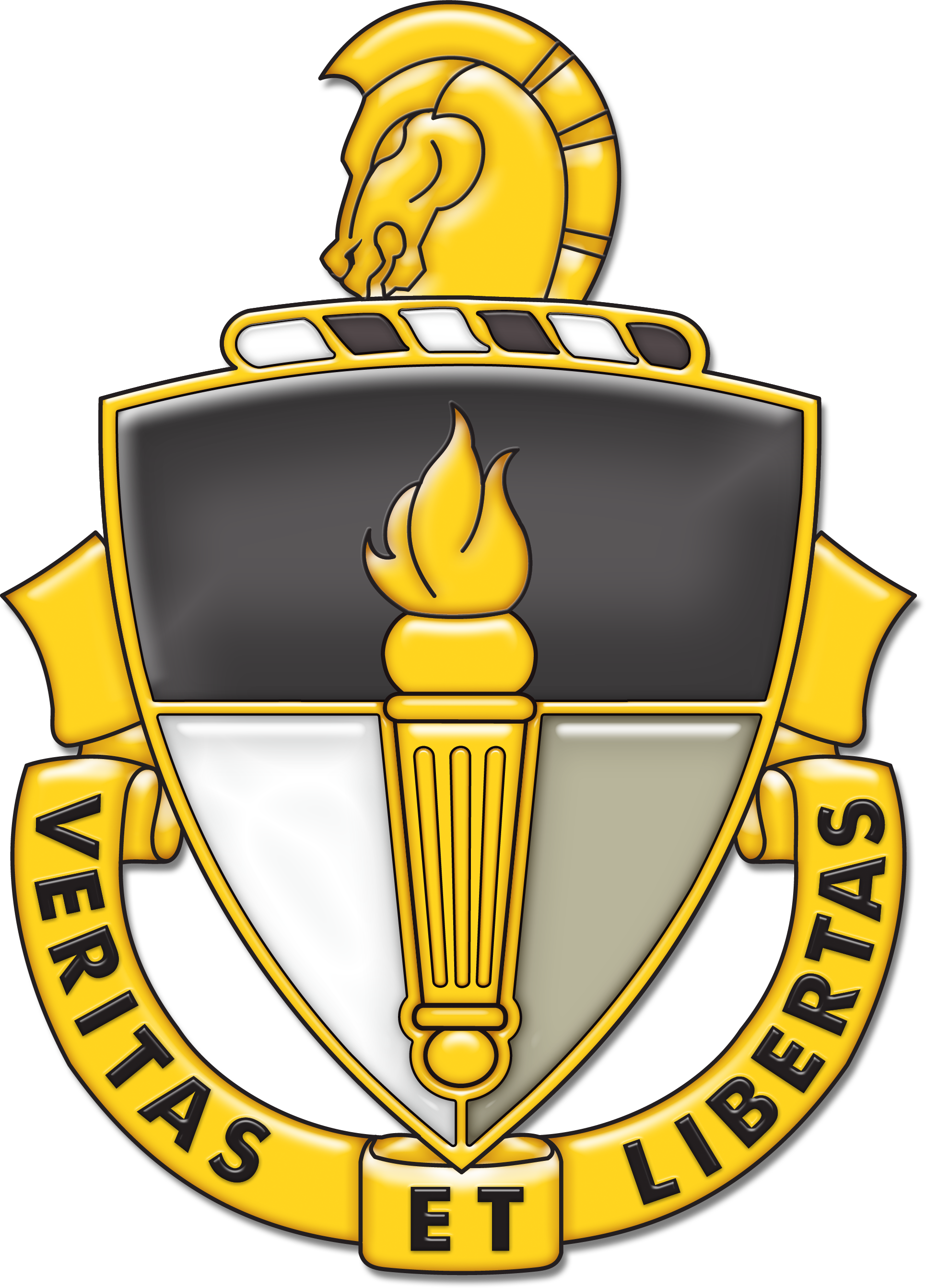
- Distinctive unit insignia

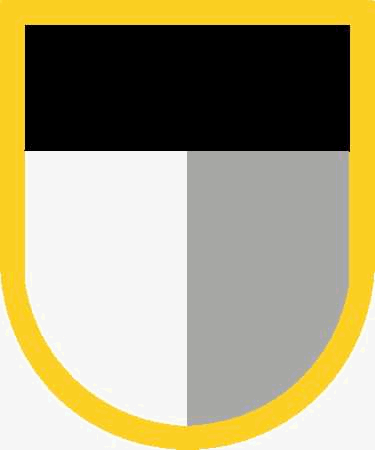
- Headquarters beret flash

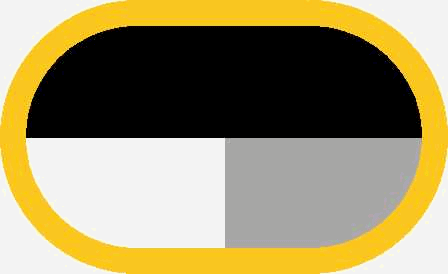
- Headquarters background trimming

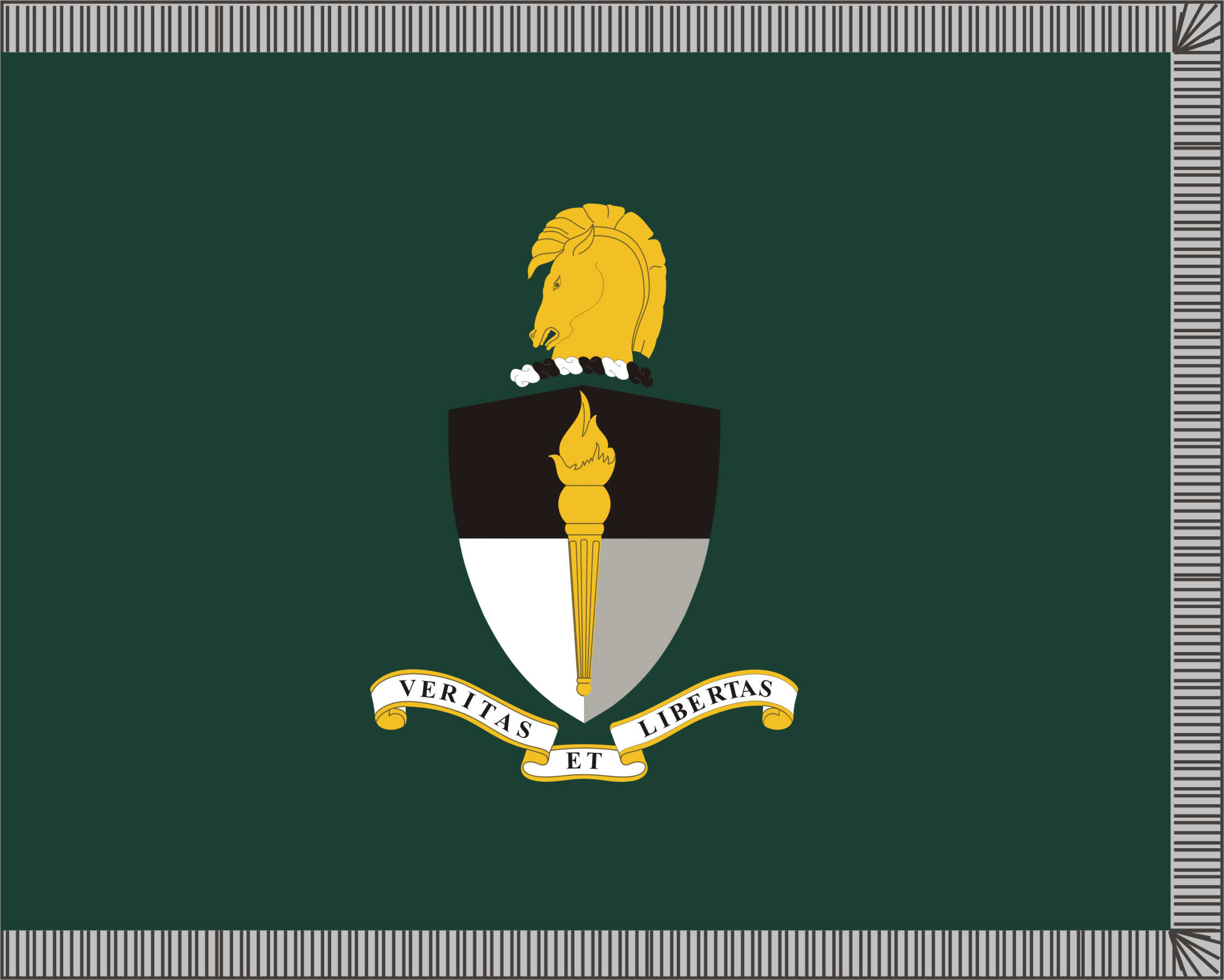
- John F Kennedy Special Warfare Center and School Flag

The U.S. Army John F. Kennedy Special Warfare Center and School (SWCS) – pronounced "Swick" – primarily trains and educates United States Army personnel for the United States Army Special Operations Command and United States Special Operations Command, which includes Special Forces, Civil Affairs, and Psychological Operations personnel. Its purpose is to recruit, assess, select, train and educate the U.S. Army Civil Affairs, Psychological Operations and Special Forces Soldiers by providing training and education, developing doctrine, integrating force-development capability, and providing career management.

== History ==
The command originated in 1950, when the U.S. Army developed the Psychological Warfare (PSYWAR) Division of the Army General School at Fort Riley, Kansas. The U.S. Army Psychological Warfare Center and School, which included operational tactical units and a school under the same umbrella, moved to Fort Bragg in 1952. The center was proposed by the Army's then-Psychological Warfare Chief, Robert A. McClure, to provide doctrinal support and training for both psychological and unconventional warfare.

The U.S. Army's The Big Picture, "Special Forces Advisor"
A film describing the training of a Special Forces Officer at the U.S. Army Special Warfare Center, circa 1963

In 1956, the PSYWAR Center and School was renamed the U.S. Army Center for Special Warfare/U.S. Army Special Warfare School. The school was tasked with developing the doctrine, techniques, training, and education of Special Forces and Psychological Operations personnel. In 1960, the school's responsibilities expanded to counterinsurgency operations. In 1962, the Special Warfare Center established a Special Forces Training Group to train enlisted volunteers for operational assignments within Special Forces units. The Advanced Training Committee was formed to explore and develop methods of infiltration and exfiltration. On 16 May 1969, the school was renamed the U.S. Army Institute for Military Assistance. The curriculum was expanded to provide training in high-altitude, low-opening (HALO) parachuting and SCUBA operations. The institute comprised the SF School, Psychological Operations, Military Assistance Training Advisors School, Counter-Insurgency School, Unconventional Warfare School and Department of Non-Resident Training.

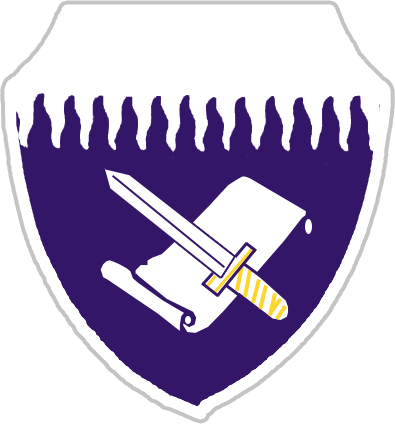
U.S. Army Civil Affairs School SSI (1943-1971)

On 1 April 1972, the U.S. Army Civil Affairs School was transferred from Fort Gordon, Georgia, to Fort Bragg, to begin operating under the center's umbrella. In 1973, the center was assigned to the new U.S. Army Training and Doctrine Command (TRADOC). On 1 June 1982, the Chief of Staff of the Army approved the separation of the center as an independent TRADOC activity under the name U.S. Army John F. Kennedy Special Warfare Center (SWC). The SWC integrated special operations into the Army systems, training and operations, becoming the proponent school for Army Special Operations Forces.

In 1985, SWC was recognized as the U.S. Army John F. Kennedy Special Warfare Center and School (SWCS). The major change at this time was the establishment of six training departments: Special Forces; Special Operations Advanced Skills; Survival, Evasion, Resistance and Escape; Foreign Area Officer; Civil Affairs; and Psychological Operations. A few years later, the Noncommissioned Officer Academy was instituted. On 20 June 1990, SWCS was reassigned from TRADOC to the U.S. Army Special Operations Command. This designation gave the U.S. Army Special Operations Command control of all components of SOF, with the exception of forward-deployed units.

== Overview ==
The U.S. Army John F. Kennedy Special Warfare Center and School (SWCS) at Fort Bragg, N.C. manages and resources training, education and growth for Soldiers in the Army's special-operations branches.

Approximately 3,100 students are enrolled in SWCS training programs at any given time. SWCS also maintains the Special Forces Warrant Officer Institute and the David K. Thuma Non-Commissioned Officer Academy (NCOA). While most courses are conducted at Fort Bragg, SWCS also has facilities and relationships with outside institutions.

Special Forces Underwater Operations School Overview (2:52)

SWCS offers 41 different courses, including courses for Civil Affairs, Psychological Operations, Special Forces and Cultural Support. Advanced skills courses include combat diver training in Key West, Florida, sniper training at Fort Bragg and military freefall training at Yuma Proving Ground in Arizona.

Regional studies and education constitutes Phase II of the three branches' qualification courses. This phase lasts 18 to 24 weeks depending on the language category (CAT) assigned them. Students who are assigned to CAT I or II languages such as Spanish, French and Indonesian spend 18 weeks of study with the end goal being to achieve a score of 2 on the Interagency Language Roundtable Scale (ILR). Students spend 24 weeks studying CAT III or IV languages such as Arabic, Mandarin Chinese, Tagalog, Persian, Korean, Thai, Pashto, or Urdu with the end goal being to achieve an ILR score of III or IV (indicating professional proficiency). All students must pass an Oral Proficiency Interview (OPI) before moving to the next phase of their qualification course. The Defense Language Institute assists with this language education.

Units and directorates of the U.S. Army Special Operations Center of Excellence
Name	Abbreviation	Description
1st Special Warfare Training Group (Airborne)	1st SWTG(A)	Provides entry-level training and education.
2nd Special Warfare Training Group (Airborne)	2nd SWTG(A)	Provides advanced training and education.
Special Warfare Medical Group (Airborne)	SWMG(A)	Together with the Naval Special Operations Medical Institute (NSOMI), composes the Joint Special Operations Medical Training Center (JSOMTC). Educates and trains special operation combat medics SOCMs.
Special Forces Warrant Officer Institute	WOI	Educates, mentors, and provides training to become a commissioned warrant officer in the U.S. Army, Military Occupational Specialty (MOS) 180A. Conducts advanced education and training courses for mid and senior grade Special Forces warrant officers. Serves as a catalyst for research and development of warrant officer professionalism.
David K. Thuma Non-Commissioned Officers Academy	NCOA	Develops and conducts Warrior Leader, Advanced and Senior Leader courses for Army special-operations NCOs.
Directorate of Training, Doctrine, and Proponency	DOTD	DOTD is a hybrid organization that deals with doctrine, personnel proponency and the future training, leadership, and education needs of the Army Special Operations Forces. It comprises the former Directorate of Training and Doctrine, Directorate of Special Operations Proponency, and the Army Special Operations Capability Integration Center. DOTD has three branch proponents, Civil Affairs, Psychological Operations, and Special Forces. For ARSOF overarching requirements there are three major elements within DOTD: Army Special Operations Capabilities Integration Center (ARSOCIC), Personnel Policy and Programs (PPP), and Training, Leader Development and Education (TLDE).
Education Support Cell	ESC	The ESC is a team of experts who foster the Army Learning Model 2015 implementation and supports continuous improvement through curriculum assistance, instructional assistance, and data collection/management assistance.
International Military Student Office	IMSO	IMSO provides and coordinates support for international military students, promotes a favorable impression of the American way of life, and supports the Security Assistance Training Program objectives through implementing various international programs, administration, courses, field studies, and sponsorships.
Voluntary Education Office	VEO	Provides information on voluntary education programs, the Army Tuition Assistance program, and procedures related to Army TA for U.S. Army Special Operations Command soldiers.
Graduate Management Office	GMO	Eligible ARSOF officers, warrant officers, and non-commissioned officers will have an opportunity to compete for a master's degree along appropriate Professional Military Education and career timelines. Two of the specific programs designed for SOF operators are the National Defense University's Joint Special Operations Master of Arts Program and the Naval Post Graduate School's Special Operations/Irregular Warfare Curriculum.

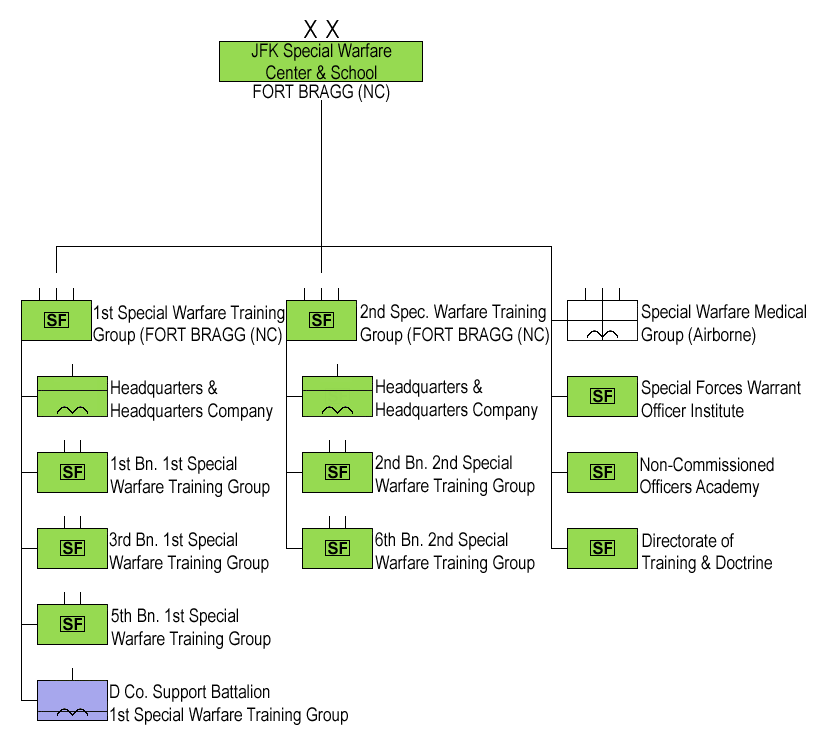
John F. Kennedy Special Warfare Center and School structure 2020

== Commanders ==
- Major General Jason C. Slider, Commander from June 2024 to Present.
- Brigadier General Guillaume "Will" Beaurpere, Commander from August 2022 to June 2024.
- Major General Patrick B. Roberson, Commander from August 2019 to August 2022.
- Major General Kurt L. Sonntag, Commander from May 2017 to August 2019
- Major General James B. Linder, Commander from May 2015 to May 2017.
- Major General Eric P. Wendt, Commander from May 2014 to May 2015.
- Brigadier General David G. Fox, Commander from November 2013 to May 2014.
- Major General Edward M. Reeder Jr., Commander from August 2012 to November 2013.
- Major General Bennet S. Sacolick, Commander from August 2010 to August 2012.
- Major General Thomas R. Csrnko, Commander from June 2008 to August 2010.
- Major General James W. Parker, Commander from June 2004 to June 2008.
- Major General Geoffrey C. Lambert, Commander from July 2003 to June 2004.
- Major General William G. Boykin, Commander from March 2000 to July 2003.
- Major General Kenneth Bowra, Commander from March 1998 to March 2000.
- Major General William P. Tangney, Commander from May 1996 to March 1998.
- Major General William F. Garrison, Commander from August 1994 to May 1996.
- Major General Sidney Shachnow, Commander from July 1992 to August 1994.
- Major General David J. Baratto, Commander from June 1988 to July 1992.
- Major General James A. Guest, Commander from August 1985 to June 1988.
- Major General Robert D. Wiegand, Commander from December 1983 to 1985.
- Major General Joseph C. Lutz, Commander from 1980 to 1982.
- Lieutenant General Jack V. Mackmull, Commander from 1977 to 1980.
- General Robert C. Kingston, Commander from 1975 to 1977.
- Major General Michael D. Healy, Commander from March 1973 to 1975.
- Lieutenant General Henry E. Emerson, Commander from January 1971 to March 1973.
- Lieutenant General Edward M. Flanagan Jr., Commander from September 1968 to January 1971.
- Major General Albert E. Milloy, Commander From 1966 to 1968.
- Brigadier General Joseph W. Stilwell Jr., Commander from 1965 to 1966.
- Lieutenant General William P. Yarborough, Commander from January 1961 to 1965.
- Brigadier General George M. Jones, Commander from 1958 to January 1961
- Colonel William J. Mullen Jr., Commander from April 1956 to 1958.
- Colonel Edson Raff, Commander from December 1954 to April 1956.
- Brigadier General Andrew Thomas McAnsh, Commander from July 1954 to December 1954.
- Colonel Gordon Singles, Commander from July 1953 to July 1954.
- Brigadier General Charles H. Karlstad, Commander from May 1952 to July 1953.

== See also ==
- List of memorials to John F. Kennedy
