= Sidney Shachnow =

United States Army general

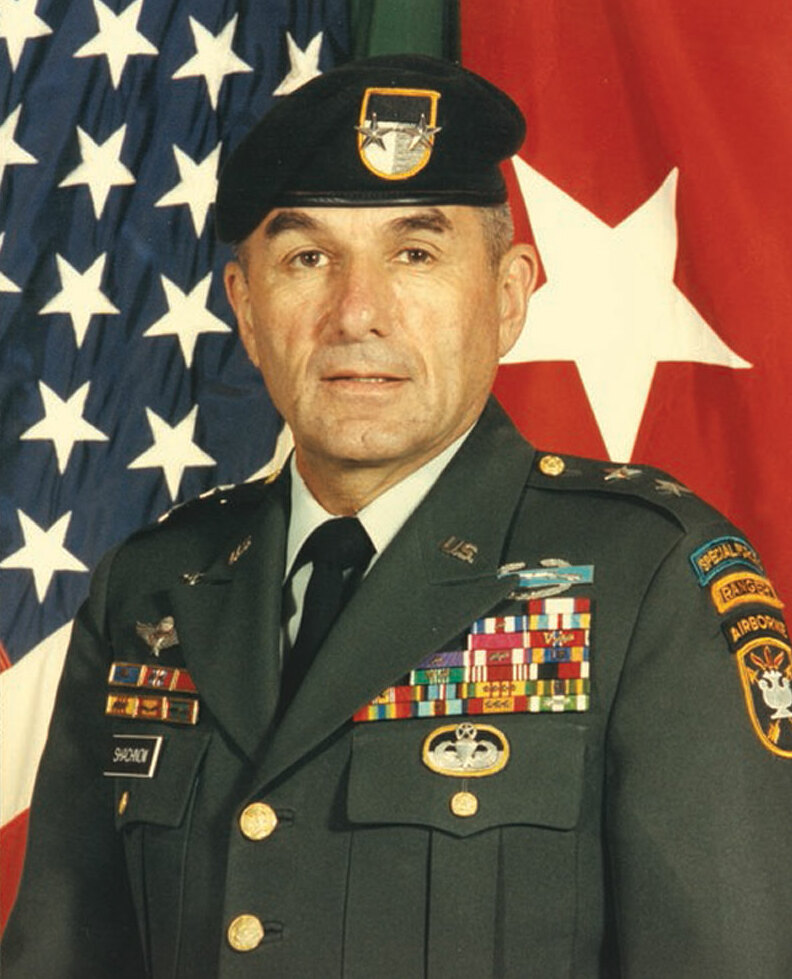
- Maj. Gen. Sidney Shachnow, USA
- Born: November 23, 1934; Kaunas, Lithuania
- Died: September 27, 2018 (aged 83); Southern Pines, North Carolina, U.S.
- Burial place: Arlington National Cemetery
- Military career
- Allegiance: United States of America
- Branch: United States Army
- Service years: 1955–1994
- Rank: Major General
- Commands: John F. Kennedy Special Warfare Center and School; U.S. Army Berlin
- Conflicts: Vietnam War
- Awards: Combat Infantryman Badge; Silver Star (2); Bronze Star Medal (3); Purple Heart (2)

Sidney Shachnow (November 23, 1934 – September 27, 2018) was a Jewish American Holocaust survivor who attained the rank of major general in United States Army. He retired in 1994, after almost 40 years of active service.

== Biography ==
=== Surviving the Holocaust, a concentration camp, and anti-Semitism ===
Sid Shachnow was born as Schaja Schachnowski in Kaunas, Lithuania, on November 23, 1934. At the age of seven, Shachnow was imprisoned in the Kovno Ghetto during World War II because his family was Jewish. For three years, he endured brutalities and lost almost every single one of his extended family members. To increase his prospects of survival, young Shachnow performed heavy manual labor under harsh conditions. He narrowly escaped death only days before Kovno's gruesome "Children's Action", of March 27–28, 1944, when Nazi troops rounded up all children in the camp and marched them to The Ninth Fort for execution or to Auschwitz to be gassed. After escaping the ghetto, Shachnow lived in hiding for months, almost dying from starvation and malnutrition. Shachnow fled west after the Soviets seized Kaunas from the Nazis and began to implement Communism. His 2,000-mile, six-month journey across Europe, mostly on foot, took him across Lithuania, Poland, Czechoslovakia, Hungary, Austria, and finally to American-occupied Nuremberg, Germany, where he hoped to obtain a visa to the United States. To make a living in war-torn Nuremberg, Shachnow resorted to pirating black market contraband such as nylon stockings and chocolate. It was during this time that he learned to speak German.

=== Visa and immigration ===
In 1950, Shachnow obtained a visa and immigrated to Salem, Massachusetts, where he attended school for the first time in his life. He took English lessons and worked in the evenings after school to help support the family financially. Just before graduation, he enlisted in the U.S. Army on January 10, 1955. As a Sergeant First Class, he entered Officer Candidate School and received his commission in the U.S. Army Infantry on April 12, 1960.

=== Special Forces and Vietnam ===
In 1962 he volunteered for the United States Army Special Forces, also known as the "Green Berets", where he served for the next thirty-two years. After joining Special Forces, Shachnow was promoted to captain and assigned as commander of Detachment A-121, his group was deployed to Vietnam's An Long Camp near the Cambodian border along the Mekong River.

Shachnow earned his first Silver Star for combat action there as well as a Purple Heart. He was shot in the leg and the arm simultaneously. After being shot, he applied a tourniquet to his leg and continued to fight, lead and care for his men in battle. He recovered from his wounds and returned home only to be diagnosed with the tuberculosis, typhoid fever and several other illnesses from which he eventually recovered.

After recovering, he earned his bachelor's degree from the University of Nebraska, and the Army promoted him to major. He couldn't attend the graduation ceremonies; he received deployment orders for his second tour to Vietnam. The army assigned Shachnow to the 101st Airborne Division, the Screaming Eagles, where he earned his second Silver Star for gallantry in action after escaping death several times.

=== Cold War, Berlin, Delta Force ===
In the 1970s he served as commander of Det-A, Berlin Brigade, a clandestine unit of Cold War Special Forces soldiers on high alert 24-hours a day. This covert unit was made up of selectively trained and language qualified members of Special Forces, as well as many Eastern European immigrants who brought much-needed culture, geographical and language skills to the assignment. Their missions were classified; they dressed in civilian clothing made in East and West Germany and carried appropriate non-American documentation and identification. Within Special Forces, they were referred to as "Stay Behind" Teams, the detachments that would stay behind if the Soviet Union ever attacked the West. Their mission was the traditional SF mission, that of Unconventional Warfare (UW), to aid those who were subjugated by an occupying force, and assist those who would rebel against the Soviets (...to teach indigenous people basic warfare tactics and weapons use, and lead them in operations against the enemy, conducting guerrilla warfare). Many of its members later went on to help form Delta Force (Det A did not itself become Delta Force). Shachnow's status grew as Special Forces grew, rising to the rank of Major General, receiving both a masters and an honorary doctoral degree along the way. He traveled the world, from Vietnam to the Middle East, Africa, Europe, Korea and back to Germany for the fall of the Berlin Wall.

=== Education ===
Shachnow attended the Benjamin Franklin Institute of Technology in Boston. While in the Army, he earned a bachelor's degree in business administration from the University of Nebraska, a Master of Science in public administration from Shippensburg State College in Pennsylvania. He also graduated from the Executive Management Program at Harvard University.

=== Retirement ===
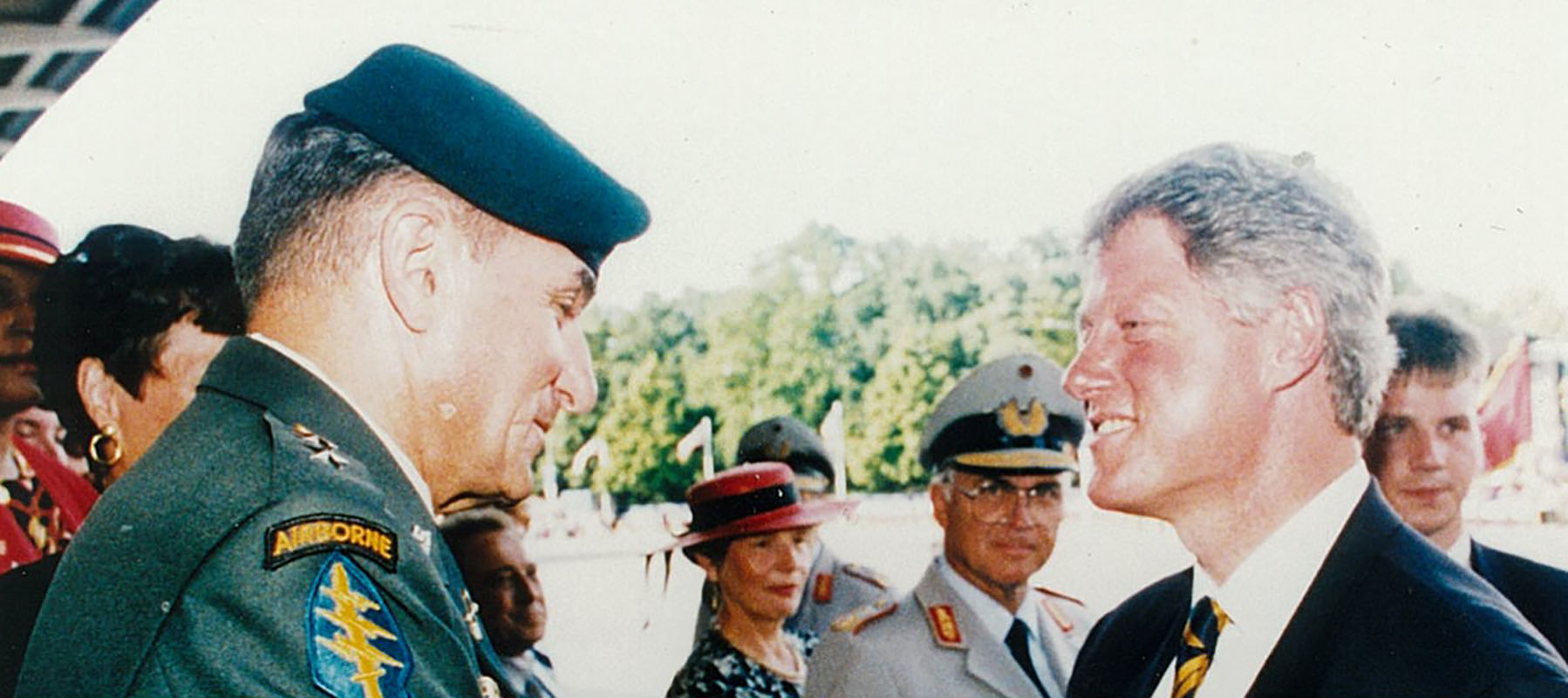
Shachnow greeting Bill Clinton

Shachnow retired from the Army in 1994, at the age of 60, after 40 years of active-duty service.

Sidney Shachnow has been an honorary member of Rotary Club Berlin-Luftbruecke (Berlin-Airlift) since March 13, 1990.

Shachnow was inducted as a Distinguished Member of the Special Forces Regiment in 2007. He was posthumously awarded the Bull Simons Award in 2019.

=== Autobiography "Hope and Honor" ===
In 2004, Shachnow authored Hope and Honor, an autobiographical account of his childhood experience in the Nazi Kovno concentration camp of Lithuania, his immigration and assimilation to the United States and his 40-year career in the U.S. Army, Special Forces.

=== Politics ===
On September 6, 2016, he endorsed Republican presidential nominee Donald Trump, though he was publicly critical of some of Trump's foreign policy proposals.

=== Personal life and death ===
Shachnow lived in Southern Pines, North Carolina and married Arlene Armstrong, a Catholic. They were married for 63 years and had four daughters as well as 14 grandchildren. He died on September 28, 2018, at the age of 83. Shachnow was interred at Arlington National Cemetery on February 12, 2019.

== Service history ==
=== Assignments and commands ===
Maj. Gen. Shachnow's past assignments have been as commander or staff officer with Infantry, Mechanized Infantry, Airmobile, Airborne and Special Forces units. Gen. Shachnow's most recent assignments include:

- Commanding General, John F. Kennedy Special Warfare Center and School, Airborne, Fort Bragg (1992–1994)
- Commanding General, United States Army Special Forces Command, Airborne, Fort Bragg
- Commanding General, U.S. Army Berlin
- Director, Washington Office, United States Special Operations Command, Airborne
- Deputy Commanding General, 1st Special Operations Command, Airborne, Fort Bragg
- Chief of Staff, 1st Special Operations Command, Airborne, Fort Bragg

=== Awards and decorations ===
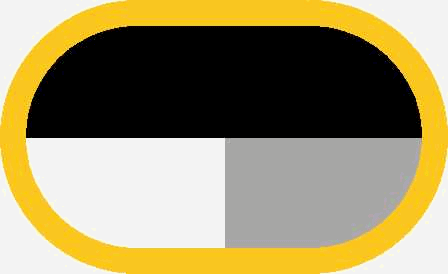
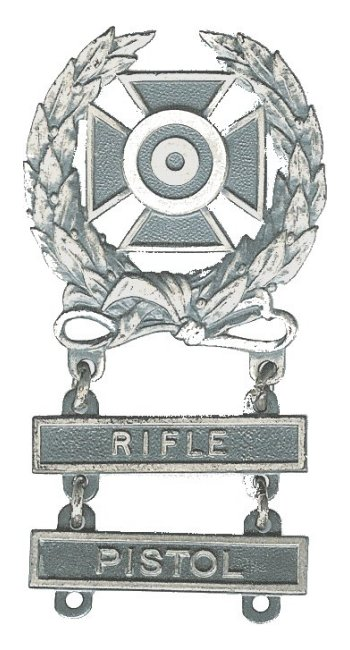
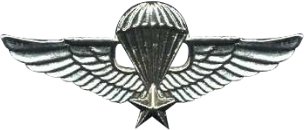
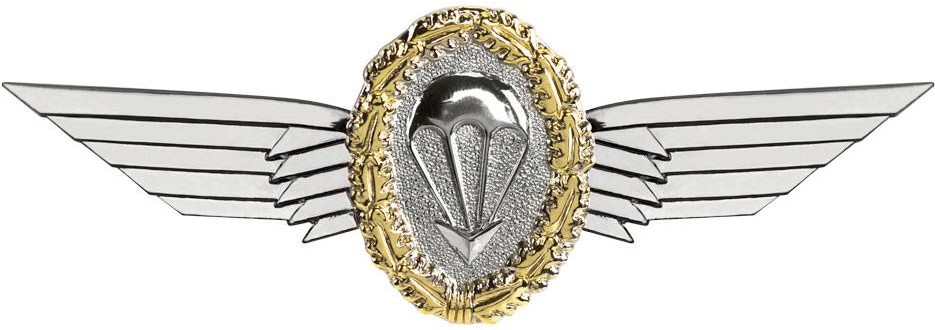
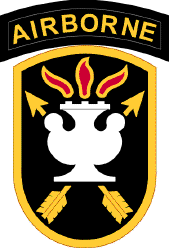
| Combat Infantryman Badge |
| Special Forces Tab |
| Ranger Tab |
| Master Parachutist Badge |
| Expert Marksmanship Badge with Rifle and Pistol bars |
| Vietnam Parachutist Badge |
| Silver German Parachutist Badge |
| John F. Kennedy Special Warfare Center and School Combat Service Identification Badge |
| 1st Special Forces Command (Airborne) Distinctive Unit Insignia |
| ? Overseas Service Bars |

| Army Distinguished Service Medal with one bronze oak leaf cluster |
| Silver Star with oak leaf cluster |
| Defense Superior Service Medal |
| Legion of Merit |
| Bronze Star Medal with Valor device and two oak leaf clusters |
| Purple Heart with oak leaf cluster |
| Meritorious Service Medal with two oak leaf clusters |
| Air Medal with bronze award numeral 13 |
| Army Commendation Medal with Valor device and two oak leaf clusters |
| Army Presidential Unit Citation with oak leaf cluster |
| Valorous Unit Award with two oak leaf clusters |
| Meritorious Unit Commendation |
| Army Good Conduct Medal |
| Army of Occupation Medal |
| National Defense Service Medal with two bronze service stars |
| Armed Forces Expeditionary Medal |
| Vietnam Service Medal with four service stars |
| Non-Commissioned Officer Professional Development Ribbon |
| Army Service Ribbon |
| Army Overseas Service Ribbon with award numeral 3 |
| Vietnam Gallantry Cross with three bronze stars |
| Vietnam Presidential Unit Citation, 2 awards |
| Vietnam Gallantry Cross Unit Citation, 2 awards (Back then, two or more of these awards were worn as fourragère.) |
| Vietnam Civil Actions Medal Unit Citation, 2 awards |
| Vietnam Campaign Medal |
