= Eric T. Hill =

US Air Force SOC deputy commander

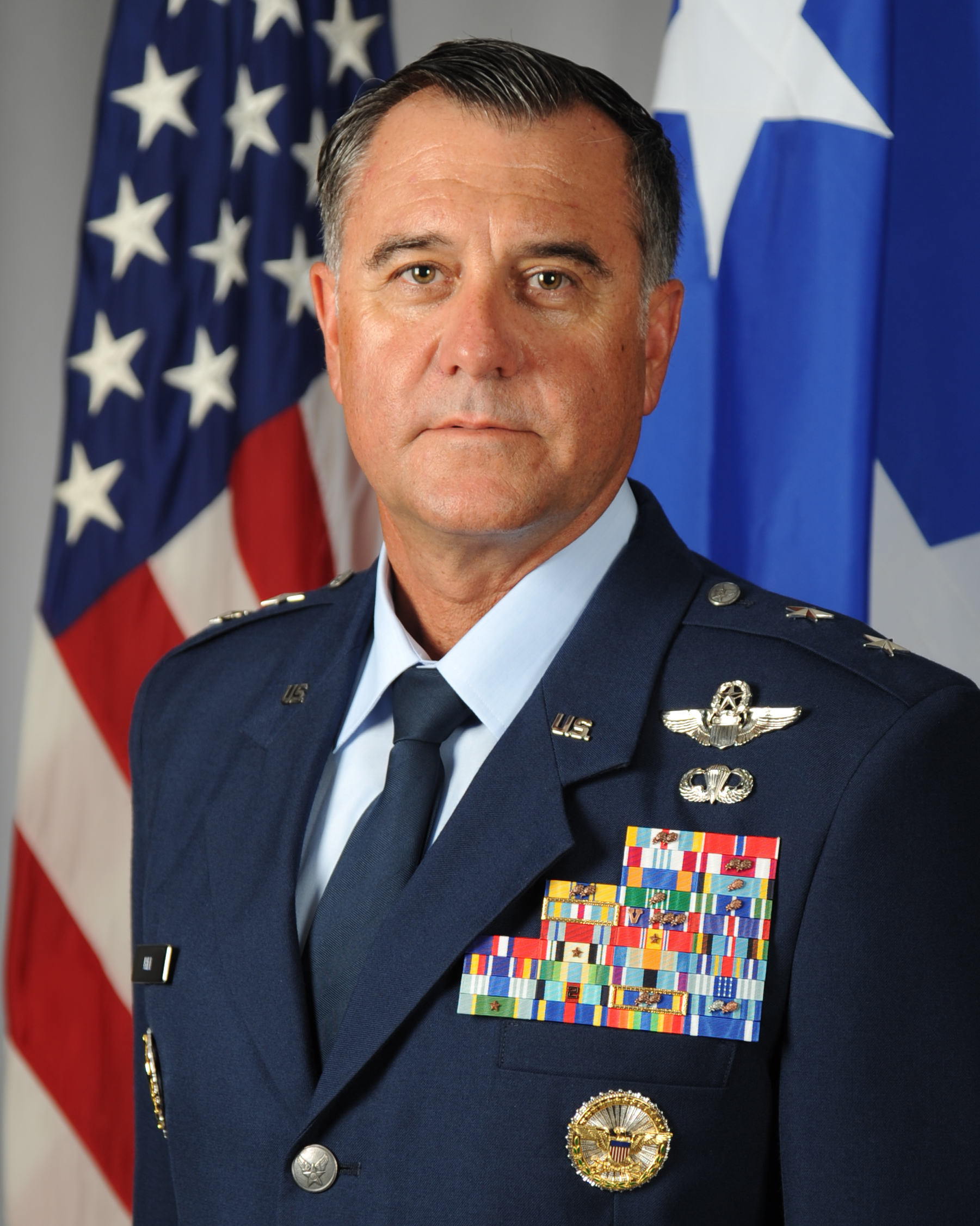
- Military career
- Allegiance: United States
- Branch: United States Army (1990–1996); United States Air Force (1996 till date)
- Service years: 1990 till date
- Rank: Major General
- Commands: Special Operations Joint Task Force-Operation Inherent Resolve, Baghdad; Joint Special Operations Air Component – Central Command
- Awards: Defense Superior Service Medal (4); Bronze Star Medal; Defense Meritorious Service Medal (9)

Eric T. Hill is a United States Air Force major general who last served as the deputy commander of the Air Force Special Operations Command. Prior to that, he was the commanding general of the Special Operations Joint Task Force-Operation Inherent Resolve.

Maj Gen Hill has been a key figure in the United States Air Force Special Operations Command's search for seaplanes capabilities.

Military offices
Preceded by ???	Vice Director of Strategy, Plans, and Policy of the United States Special Operations Command; 2015–2017	Succeeded by ???
Preceded by Bradley T. Gericke	Vice Director of Strategy, Plans, and Policy of the United States Central Command; 2017 Till Date	Succeeded by Clark Quinn
Preceded by Patrick B. Roberson	Commanding General of Special Operations Joint Task Force-Operation Inherent Resolve; 2019 Till Date	Succeeded by Guillaume N. Beaurpere
Preceded by Vincent K. Becklund	Deputy Commander of the Air Force Special Operations Command; 2020 Till date	Succeeded by Matthew W. Davidson
