= Kenneth Bowra =

US special forces officer and diplomat (born 1948)

Major-General Kenneth Bowra
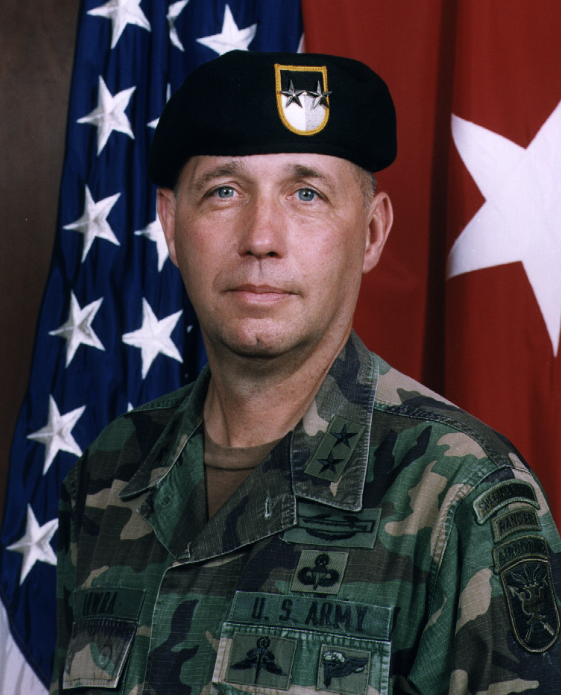
- US Army portrait
- Born: October 23, 1948 (age 77)
- Military career
- Allegiance: United States of America
- Branch: United States Army
- Service years: 1970–2003
- Rank: Major General
- Units: 82nd Airborne Division; 4th Infantry Division; 75th Ranger Regiment; MACV-SOG; Delta Force
- Commands: 5th Special Forces Group; 1st Special Forces Command; United States Southern Command; John F. Kennedy Special Warfare Center and School
- Wars: Vietnam War; Cambodian Civil War; Invasion of Grenada; Somali Civil War; Gulf War; Kosovo War

Kenneth Rhodes Bowra (born October 23, 1948) is a retired major general who served in the US Army from 1970 to 2003. Bowra saw service with US special forces in the Vietnam War and Cambodian Civil War and has worked with the Central Intelligence Agency and Joint Special Operations Command. He later fought in the US Invasion of Grenada and in the Somali Civil War and First Gulf War. In 1998 he was given command of the John F. Kennedy Special Warfare Center and School and in 2000 was deputy commander of NATO's Kosovo Force. Retiring in 2003 he is now a diplomat with the US State Department in Saudi Arabia.

== Vietnam ==
Kenneth Bowra attended The Citadel military college in South Carolina and graduated in 1970. He was commissioned into the 82nd Airborne Division and completed special forces training. Deployed in the Vietnam War initially as a Military Assistance Command, Vietnam – Studies and Observations Group reconnaissance team leader Bowra later served as an advisor to Cambodian Army units undertaking training with US forces, leading them on combat missions in Cambodia. Upon his return to the US he served as commander of a High Altitude Low Opening Special Atomic Demolition Munition paratroop unit with the 5th Special Forces Group. Bowra was posted back to Cambodia in 1974 with the Military Equipment Delivery Team Cambodia and remained in the country until the April 1975 collapse of the Khmer Republic.

== Special operations ==
Bowra spent the next eight years on various assignments with the Central Intelligence Agency from 1977 to 1978, 4th Infantry Division in Fort Carson, Colorado and the 2nd battalion of the 75th Ranger Infantry Regiment (Airborne) at Fort Lewis in Washington. In 1983 Bowra volunteered for and completed a specialized selection course for assignment to Delta Force and remained with the unit for five years, participating in Operation Urgent Fury in Grenada. Bowra returned to the 5th Special Forces Group in 1988 as the commander of the 2nd battalion and worked on Operation Salam, a de-mining operation in Afghanistan. He was promoted to commander of Army 5th Special Forces Group from 1991 to 1993 and conducted combat and humanitarian operations in Somalia as well as border surveillance and combat operations in Kuwait. He was placed in charge of Special Operations Command South, United States Southern Command in November 1993, and held that post until January 1996. Whilst with that unit Bowra led anti-drugs and humanitarian operations in Central and South America and formed the multi-national peace-keeping force that helped to end the Cenepa War.

Bowra was assigned command of the U.S. Army Special Forces Command (Airborne) in May 1996 where he helped to develop the first human rights policy for US special forces soldiers. Bowra was given command of the John F. Kennedy Special Warfare Center and School in March 1998 and in March 2000 was deputy-commander of the NATO headquarters of Kosovo Force (KFOR) with responsibility for overseeing all KFOR operations (including Russian forces) and providing support for elections in the country. He was appointed assistant chief of staff of NATO's Allied Forces Northern Europe in January 2001 and was simultaneously the senior American military representative to the Netherlands. Bowra retired from the army as a major-general on 1 October 2003. He now works for the State Department as a diplomat at the US embassy in Saudi Arabia. Bowra has written about the Vietnam and Cambodian wars.

The most recent U.S. State Department listing of key officials in foreign posts does not show Bowra in any post in Saudi Arabia.

== Awards and decorations ==
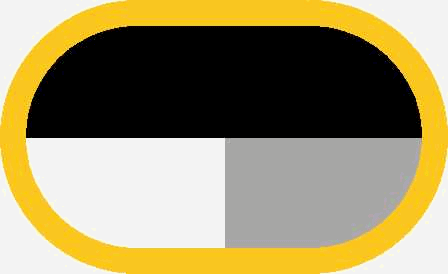
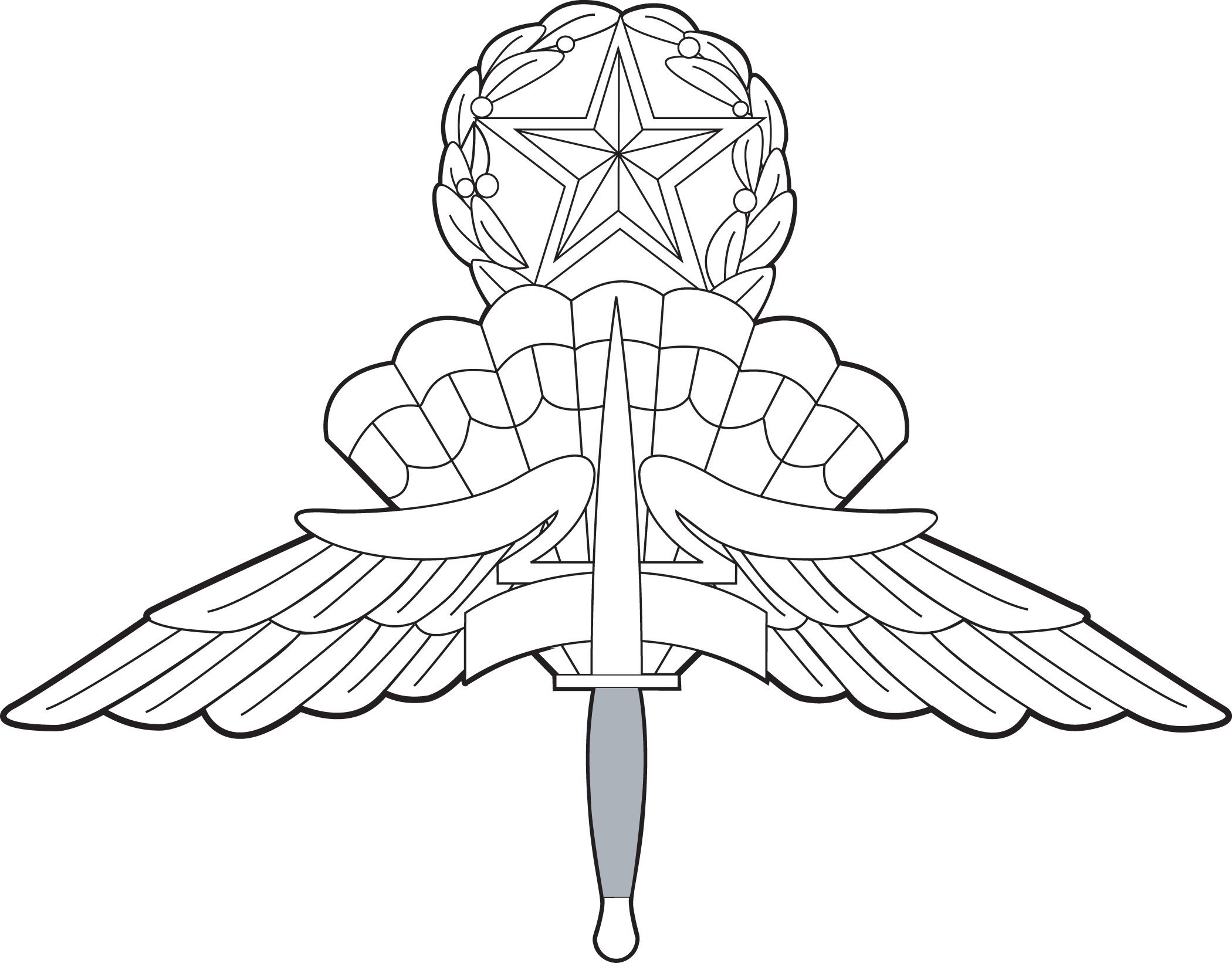
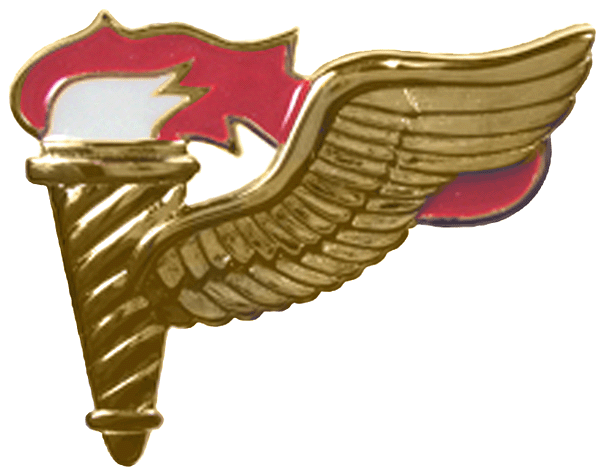
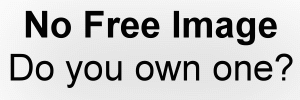
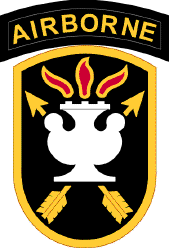
Combat Infantryman Badge
Expert Infantryman Badge
Special Forces Tab
Ranger Tab
Master Parachutist Badge with SWCS background trimming
Military Free Fall Jumpmaster Badge
Pathfinder Badge
Irish Parachutist Badge in silver
Unidentified foreign parachutist badge
John F. Kennedy Special Warfare Center and School Combat Service Identification Badge
? Overseas Service Bars

Defense Distinguished Service Medal
Army Distinguished Service Medal
Defense Superior Service Medal (with two oak leaf clusters)
Legion of Merit (with oak leaf cluster)
Bronze Star Medal for Valor (with two oak leaf clusters)
Purple Heart
Meritorious Service Medal (with two oak leaf clusters)
Air Medal
Joint Service Commendation medal (with two oak leaf clusters)
Army Commendation Medal (with two oak leaf clusters)
Joint Service Achievement Medal
Army Presidential Unit Citation
Joint Meritorious Unit Award (with three oak leaf clusters)
Valorous Unit Award
Meritorious Unit Commendation (with oak leaf cluster)
National Defense Service Medal (with two service stars)
Armed Forces Expeditionary Medal (with two service stars)
Vietnam Service Medal (with two service stars)
Southwest Asia Service Medal (with two service stars)
Kosovo Campaign Medal
Global War On Terrorism Service Medal
Humanitarian Service Medal (with two service stars)
Army Service Ribbon
Army Overseas Service Ribbon (with award numeral 3)
North Atlantic Treaty Organization Medal for Kosovo
Republic of Vietnam Gallantry Cross Unit Citation
Vietnam Campaign Medal
