= S. Clinton Hinote =

U.S. Air Force Lieutenant general

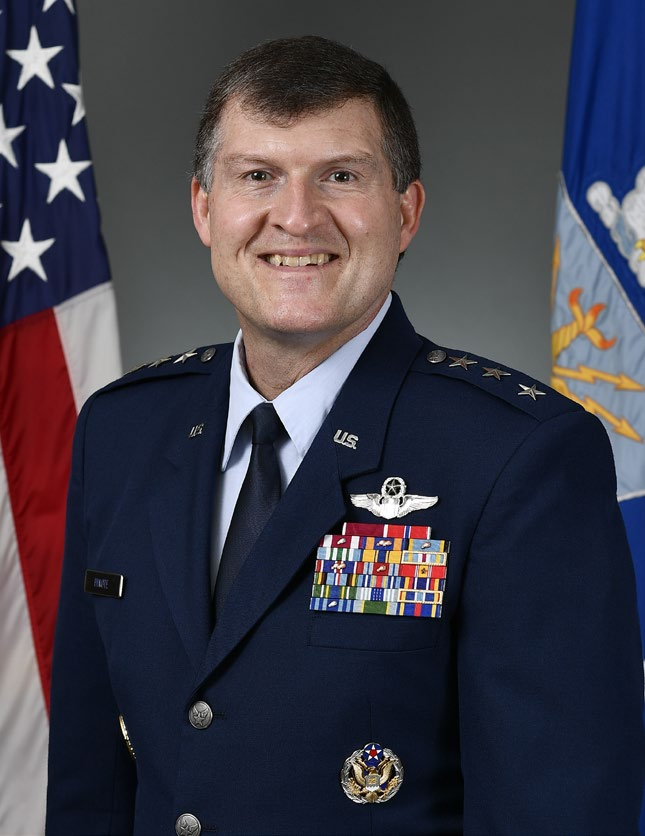
- Military career
- Allegiance: United States
- Branch: United States Air Force
- Service years: 1992–2023
- Rank: Lieutenant General
- Commands: 8th Fighter Wing; 3rd Fighter Training Squadron
- Awards: Defense Superior Service Medal; Legion of Merit; Bronze Star Medal

Samuel Clinton Hinote is a retired United States Air Force lieutenant general who last served as the Deputy Chief of Staff for Air Force Futures. Previously he was the Deputy Director for Air Force Warfighting Integration Capability, Deputy Chief of Staff for Strategic Plans and Requirements.

== Awards and decorations ==
US Air Force Command Pilot Badge
Headquarters Air Force Badge
Office of the Joint Chiefs of Staff Identification Badge

Legion of Merit
Bronze Star Medal
Meritorious Service Medal with one silver oak leaf cluster
Air Medal with two oak leaf clusters
Aerial Achievement Medal with oak leaf cluster
Joint Service Commendation Medal
Air Force Commendation Medal
Joint Meritorious Unit Award
Air Force Outstanding Unit Award with two oak leaf clusters
Combat Readiness Medal with oak leaf cluster
National Defense Service Medal with one bronze service star
Armed Forces Expeditionary Medal
Global War on Terrorism Expeditionary Medal
Global War on Terrorism Service Medal
Korea Defense Service Medal
Air Force Overseas Short Tour Service Ribbon
Air Force Expeditionary Service Ribbon with gold frame
Air Force Longevity Service Award with one silver and one bronze oak leaf clusters
Small Arms Expert Marksmanship Ribbon
Air Force Training Ribbon

== Effective dates of promotions ==
Rank	Date
Second Lieutenant	May 27, 1992
First Lieutenant	May 27, 1994
Captain	May 27, 1996
Major	November 1, 2002
Lieutenant Colonel	December 1, 2006
Colonel	October 1, 2010
Brigadier General	August 2, 2016
Major General	May 22, 2020
Lieutenant General	June 15, 2020

Military offices
Preceded by John W. Pearse	Commander of the 8th Fighter Wing; 2013–2014	Succeeded by Kenneth P. Ekman
Preceded by Vincent Becklund	Deputy Chief of the Office of Security Cooperation-Iraq; 2017–2018	Succeeded by Craig D. Wills
Preceded by ???	Deputy Director of the Air Force Warfighting Integration Capability; 2018–2020	Succeeded by John C. Walker
Preceded by Michael A. Fantini; Acting	Deputy Chief of Staff for Air Force Futures of the United States Air Force; 2020–2023	Succeeded by David A. Harris Jr.
