= Kenneth P. Ekman =

U.S. Air Force general

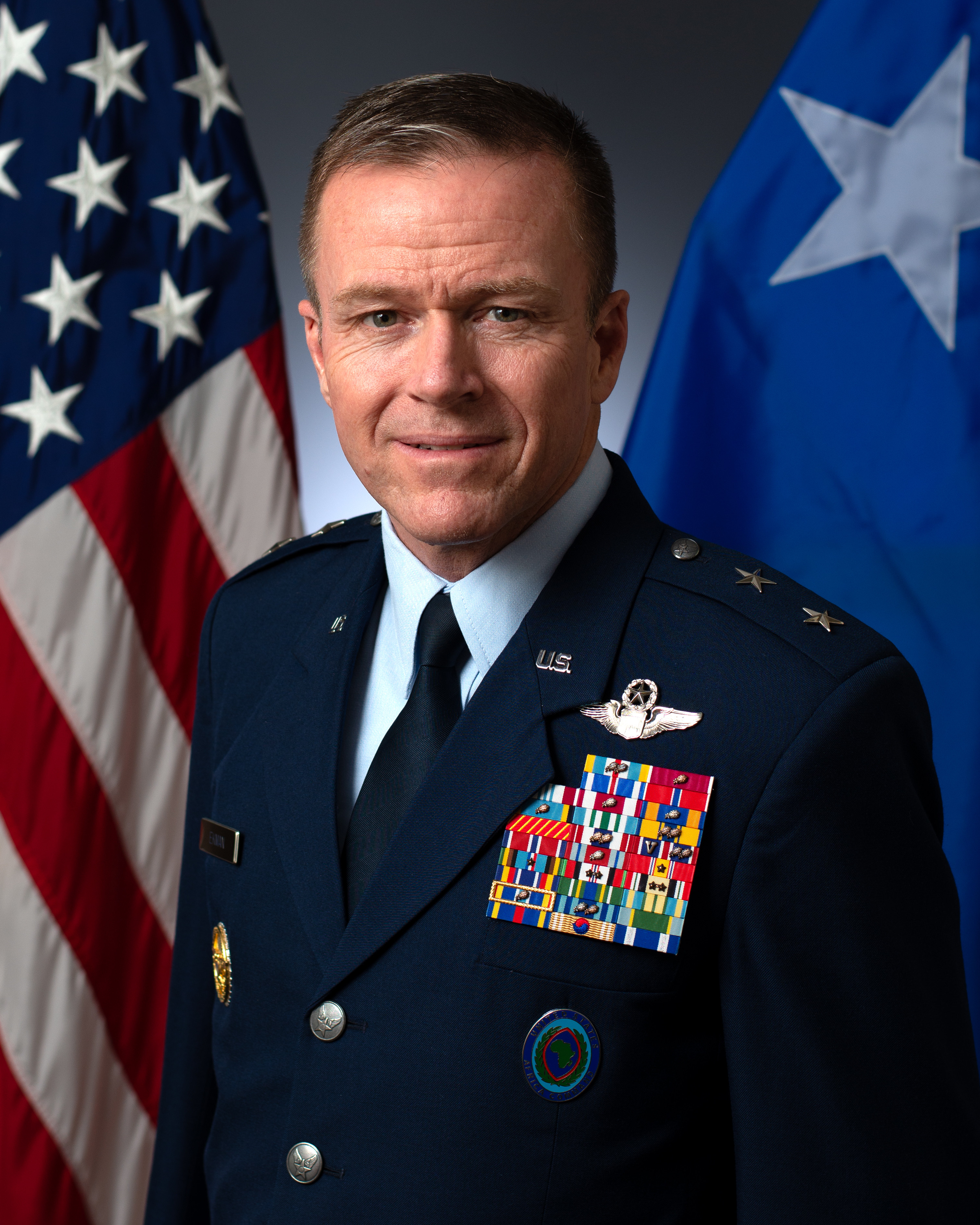
- Military career
- Allegiance: United States
- Branch: United States Air Force
- Service years: 1991–2025
- Rank: Major General
- Commands: 8th Fighter Wing; 79th Expeditionary Fighter Squadron; 79th Fighter Squadron
- Conflicts: War in Afghanistan; Iraq War; Operation Inherent Resolve
- Awards: Defense Superior Service Medal (3); Legion of Merit (2); Distinguished Flying Cross; Bronze Star Medal

Kenneth P. Ekman is a retired United States Air Force major general who served as the Department of Defense West Africa Coordination Element Lead. He previously served as the director of strategy, engagement, and programs of the United States Africa Command.

Ekman served as deputy commander for operations of the Combined Joint Task Force – Operation Inherent Resolve. He also served as the vice commander of the First Air Force.

Military offices
Preceded by S. Clinton Hinote	Commander of the 8th Fighter Wing; 2014–2015	Succeeded by Jeremy T. Sloane
Preceded by Andrew A. Croft	Vice Director of Operations of the North American Aerospace Defense Command; 2015–2016	Succeeded by Jeremy T. Sloane
Preceded by Daniel J. Orcutt	Vice Commander of the First Air Force; 2018–2020	Succeeded by William D. Betts
Preceded by Alexus Grynkewich	Deputy Commander for Operations of the Combined Joint Task Force – Operation Inherent Resolve; 2020–2021	Vacant
Preceded by John M. Wood	Director of Strategy, Engagement and Programs of the United States Africa Command; 2021–2024	Succeeded by Garrick M. Harmon
