= Patrick B. Roberson =

United States Army Major General

Major General Patrick B. Roberson
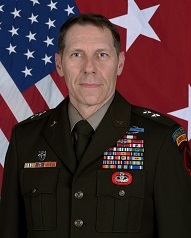
- Branch: Army
- Service years: 1990 – 2024
- Rank: Major General
- Commands: United States Army John F. Kennedy Special Warfare Center and School (Commanding General) Operation Inherent Resolve(Commanding General) CJOSTF Afghanistan (TF Commander) 3rd Special Forces Group (Group Commander) 10th Special Forces Group (Battalion, Company, Detachment Commander)
- Conflicts: Operation Provide Comfort; Operation Joint Guard; Operation Iraqi Freedom; Operation Enduring Freedom; Operation Inherent Resolve
- Alma mater: Mankato State University

Patrick B. Roberson is a retired United States Army Major General, most recently serving as the Deputy Commanding General of the United States Army Special Operations Command August 2022 to June 2024. He previously served as Commanding General, United States Army John F. Kennedy Special Warfare Center and School from August 2019 to August 2022, and as Commander of Special Operations Joint Task Force-Operation Inherent Resolve Iraq and Syria July 2018 and June 2019.

== Military career ==
Roberson attended the Minnesota State University, Mankato and graduated in 1990 with a Bachelor of Science degree in political science, and was commissioned from the Maverick ROTC Battalion as a second lieutenant into the Infantry Branch. His initial assignment was with the 504th Parachute Infantry Regiment at Fort Bragg as a rifle platoon leader, then a heavy weapons platoon leader, and finally as a company executive officer.

In 1994, Roberson volunteered for US Army Special Forces. Upon completion of the Special Forces Qualification Course, Roberson served in 10th Special Forces Group (Airborne) as a Detachment Commander in Iraq during Operation Provide Comfort and in Bosnia-Herzegovina during Operation Joint Guard. He served as a Company Commander in Task Force Viking, a Battalion Executive Officer, and as the Battalion Commander of a Special Operations Task Force in Iraq during Operation Iraqi Freedom

Following Battalion Command in 2010, Roberson attended the School of Advanced Military Studies War College Fellowship and then assumed command of 3rd Special Forces Group (Airborne) at Fort Bragg. A significant part of this time was spent in Afghanistan as the Commander of CJSOTF Afghanistan as part of Operation Enduring Freedom. Upon completion of command, he was selected to serve as the United States Army Special Operations Command Chief of Staff.

In 2015, Roberson was assigned as Deputy Commanding General-Operations, 1st Special Forces Command (Airborne). He then served as the Deputy Commanding General for Special Operations Joint Task Force Operation Inherent Resolve in Iraq and Syria. Following this, he took the position of Deputy Chief of Staff G-3/5/7, United States Army Reserve Command at Fort Bragg. His follow-on assignment was as Commanding General Special Operations Joint Task Force Operation Inherent Resolve in Iraq and Syria from 2018-2019.

Roberson was assigned as Commander, United States John F. Kennedy Special Warfare Center and School in August 2019. His most recent assignment was as the Deputy Commanding General of the United States Army Special Operations Command.

== Awards and decorations ==
U.S. military decorations
Army Distinguished Service Medal
Defense Superior Service Medal with bronze "C" device and two bronze oak leaf clusters
Legion of Merit with bronze "C" device and 4 oak leaf clusters
Bronze Star Medal with three bronze oak leaf clusters
Defense Meritorious Service Medal with one bronze oak leaf cluster
Meritorious Service Medal with three bronze oak leaf clusters
Joint Service Commendation Medal
Army Commendation Medal with bronze oak leaf cluster
Army Achievement Medal with bronze oak leaf cluster
U.S. Unit Awards
Joint Meritorious Unit Award
Valorous Unit Award with Bronze Oak Leaf Cluster
Superior Unit Award
U.S. Service (Campaign) Medals and Service and Training Ribbons
National Defense Service Medal with one bronze service star
Afghanistan Campaign Medal with one campaign star
Iraq Campaign Medal with five campaign star
Inherent Resolve Campaign Medal with two campaign star
Global War on Terrorism Expeditionary Medal
Global War on Terrorism Service Medal
NATO Medal Bosnia Service
Army Service Ribbon
Army Overseas Service Ribbon
Badges
Combat Infantryman Badge
Expert Infantryman Badge
Special Forces Tab
Ranger Tab
Master Parachutist Badge with USASOC background trimming
United States Army Special Operations Command Combat Service Identification Badge
Israeli Parachutist Badge
Special Forces Distinctive Unit Insignia
10 Overseas Service Bars
