= Combined Joint Task Force – Operation Inherent Resolve =

Task force created to fight the Islamic State

- Seal of Combined Joint Task Force – Operation Inherent Resolve
- Founder: United States
- Founding leader: United States Central Command
- Leader: (United States) Maj. General Kevin J. Lambert
- Deputy Commander: (United Kingdom) Brig. Duncan Mann
- Chief of Staff: (United States) Brig. Gen Leslie F. Hauck III
- Senior Enlisted Leader: (United States) CSM. Robert M. Preusser Jr.
- Dates active: 10 October 2014 – present (11 years, 11 months, 3 weeks and 1 day)
- Headquarters: Jordan
- Size: 2,900 (2025)
- Part of: CENTCOM
- Wars: the Syrian Civil War, the War in Iraq (2013–2017), the Iran war
- Website: www.inherentresolve.mil

Combined Joint Task Force – Operation Inherent Resolve (CJTF–OIR) is a joint task force established by a U.S.-led international coalition against the Islamic State. Its stated aim is to "degrade and destroy" the Islamic State. Led by United States Army Central (ARCENT), it is composed of military forces and personnel from over 30 countries.

Formed in October 2014 by United States Central Command, CJTF-OIR was intended to replace the ad hoc arrangements that had been established to coordinate operations against ISIL, following its rapid gains in Iraq in June. Operation Inherent Resolve included the US-led intervention in Iraq (2014–2021) and the American-led intervention in the Syrian Civil War. The current commander of the coalition is U.S. Army Brigadier General Kevin J. Lambert and the current Command Senior Enlisted Leader is U.S. Army Command Sergeant Major Robert M. Preusser Jr.

The bulk of CJTF-OIR's operations were airstrikes against Islamic State. Various ground forces have been deployed including special forces, artillery, training, and military advisors. In 2017 the United States carried out 75-80% of the airstrikes, with the remainder conducted by Australia, Canada, Denmark, France, Jordan, Belgium, the Netherlands, Saudi Arabia, Turkey, the United Arab Emirates, and the United Kingdom. All of 32 NATO members (as of 2025) were contributing to the Combined Joint Task Force in 2019.

By the end of 2017, the Task Force stated that its airstrikes had killed over 80,000 ISIL fighters. The coalition also provided $3.5 billion in military equipment to the Iraqi security forces. It has also provided significant support to the Syrian Democratic Forces, with which it coordinates various operations.

The coalition ended its combat mission in Iraq in December 2021, but U.S. troops remained in the country in a training and advisory role. In September 2024, the United States Department of Defense announced a "two-phase transition plan" for CJTF-OIR operations in Iraq. In the first phase, finishing in September 2025, the coalition's military mission in Iraq would end, meaning coalition forces would withdraw from certain locations in Iraq as mutually determined. The second phase would entail a full military withdrawal from the country. The two-phase transition period in Iraq began in September 2024 and ended on 30 September 2026.

== Structure ==
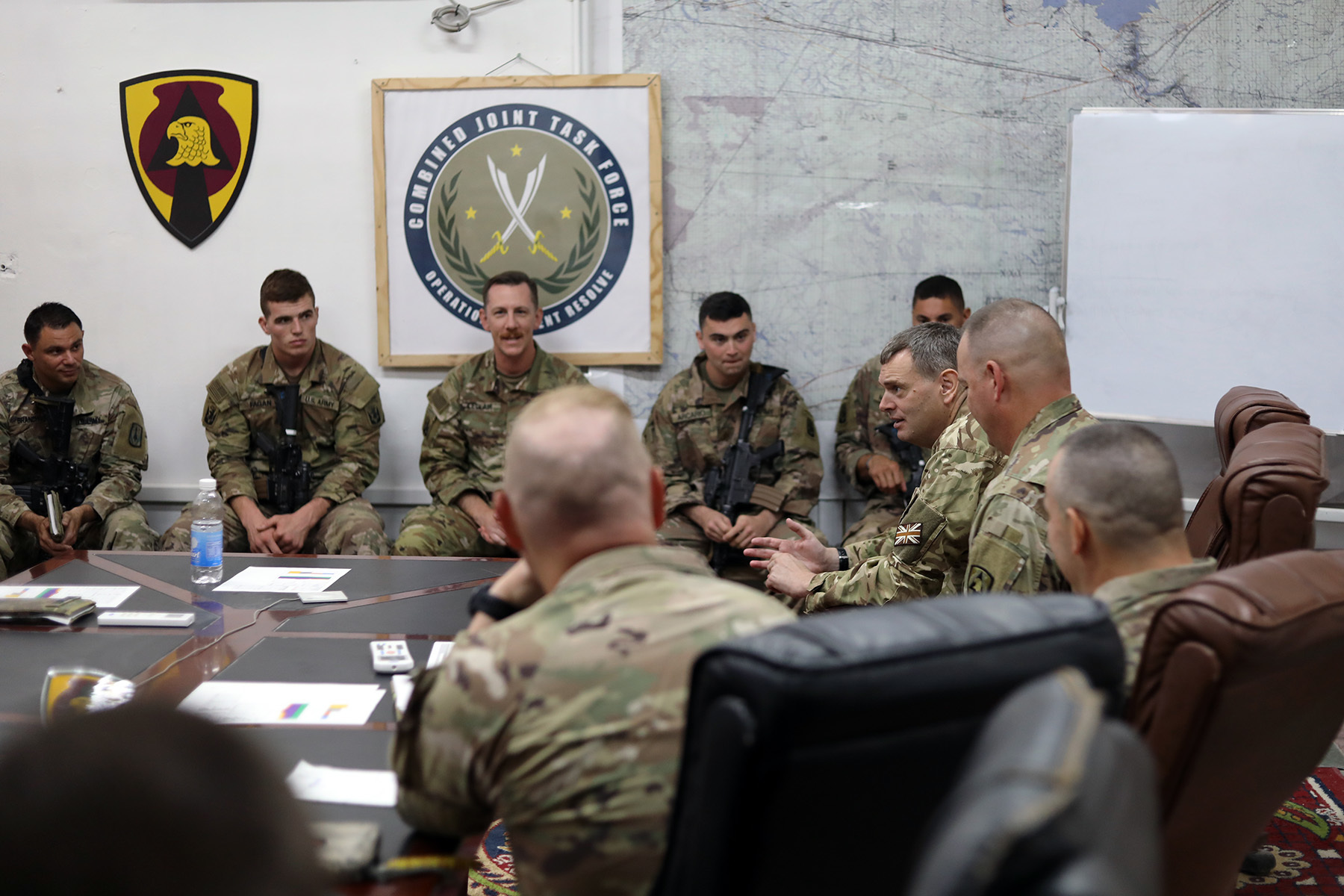
Brig. Richard Bell, deputy commander of CJTF-OIR, visiting coalition personnel at Al Asad Airbase, Iraq on 24 July 2021

As of September 2019, U.S. Army Lieutenant General Robert "Pat" White commanded CJTF-OIR in an appointment which consolidated three commander's tasks. White is also the commander of the U.S. III Corps, which assumed authority over CJTF-OIR from ARCENT on 22 September 2015, turned over its command to XVIII Airborne Corps in August 2016, and then resumed command on 5 September 2017. White has two deputies, a British Army officer, Major General Gerald Strickland, who is currently serving as CJTF-OIR Deputy Commander-Stability, and a U.S. Air Force officer, Major General Alexus G. Grynkewich, who is currently serving as CJTF-OIR Deputy Commander-Operations and Intelligence. CJTF-OIR's headquarters is at Camp Arifjan in Kuwait and includes approximately 700 personnel from 27 nations who are involved in coordinating operations in Iraq and Syria.

Lt. Gen. White handed over operational control to Lt. Gen. Paul Calvert on 9 September, 2020. Command was subsequently passed to Maj. Gen. John Brennan on 9 September 2021.

A dozen countries not involved in combat operations still contribute to the Building Capacity Mission (BPC) in Iraq. Those who have announced their participation in the program, which trains the Iraq Armed Forces and Iraqi Police, include the United States, the United Kingdom, Australia, Canada, Belgium, Denmark, France, Germany, Italy, the Netherlands, New Zealand, Norway, Slovenia, and Spain.

CENTCOM announced in May 2015 that nearly 6,500 Iraqi personnel completed training, with approximately 5,400 currently in training.

On 15 March 2019, a Tweet from the Combined Joint Task Force announced that 189,000 Iraqi soldiers, police, border guards, and air force personnel had received training from CJTF-OIR.

=== Special operations joint task force ===
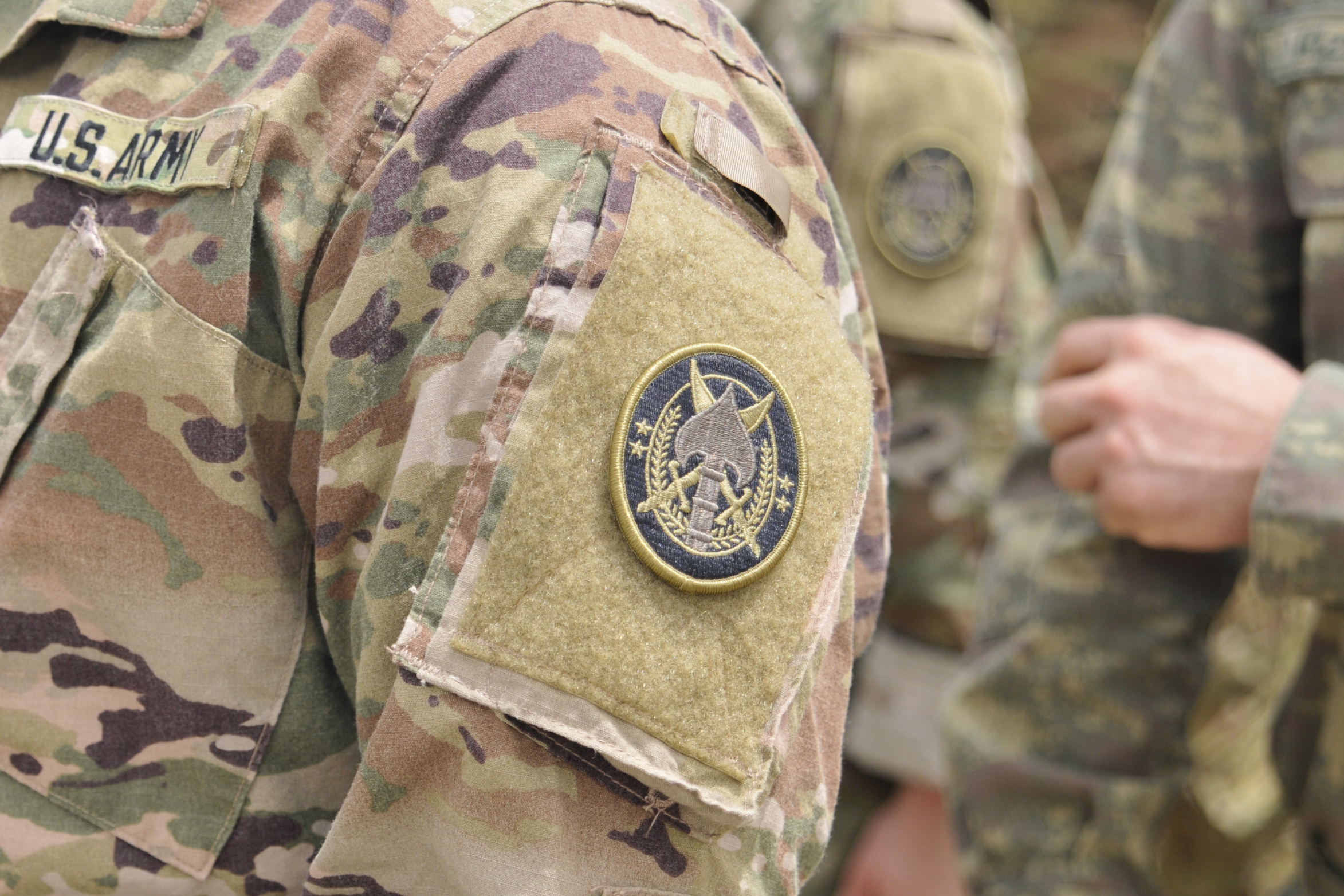
The Special Operations Joint Task Force – Operation Inherent Resolve patch in 2017

Special Operations Joint Task Force-Operation Inherent Resolve (SOJTF-OIR) was formally created in January 2016 by 1st Special Forces Command to spearhead the overall force's campaign. The task force's job was to coordinate, train, accompany and advise partner forces in Syria and Iraq against ISIS forces. Major General James E. Kraft led the new task force of about 2,000 troops. By 2017, the task force had helped lead local forces to liberate 70 cities including Ramadi, Fallujah and Mosul.

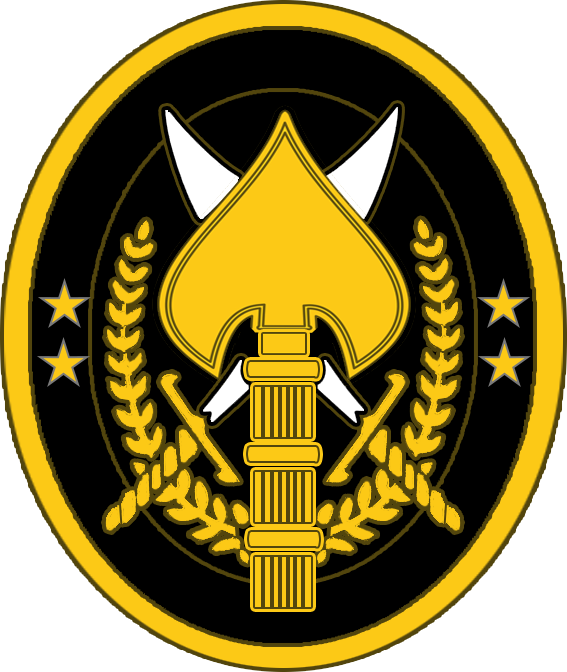
US Army Special Operations Joint Task Force Operation Inherent Resolve SSI

Special Operations Joint Task Force-Operation Inherent Resolve was restructured as Combined Special Operations Joint Task Force-Levant (CSOJTF-L) on 1 July 2022. SOJTF-Levant serves under Special Operations Command Central and has trained special operations units in the region. CSOJTF-Levant was to oversee a broader, regional approach to special operations, including activities in Jordan, Lebanon, and Egypt, commanded by Brigadier General Isaac J. Peltier. According to retired army SOF General Joseph Votel, the reshaped task force was "a maturing of our overall approach in the region", adding that CSOJTF-L combines "multiple SOF headquarters and units that were conducting a variety of missions across" the area of responsibility.

SOJTF-OIR Commanders
Name	Start	End	Service	Ref.
MG James E. Craft	2016	2018	U.S. Army	
MG Patrick B. Roberson	2018	2019	U.S. Army	
MG Eric T. Hill	2019	2020	U.S. Air Force	
SOJTF-L Commanders
BG Isaac J. Peltier	2021	2022	U.S. Army	
BG Claude K. Tudor Jr.	2022	2023	U.S. Air Force	
BG Philip J. Ryan	2023	2024	U.S. Army	
BG Michael A. Brooks	2024	2025	U.S.M.C.	
BG Mason R. Dula	2025	incumbent	U.S. Air Force	

== History ==
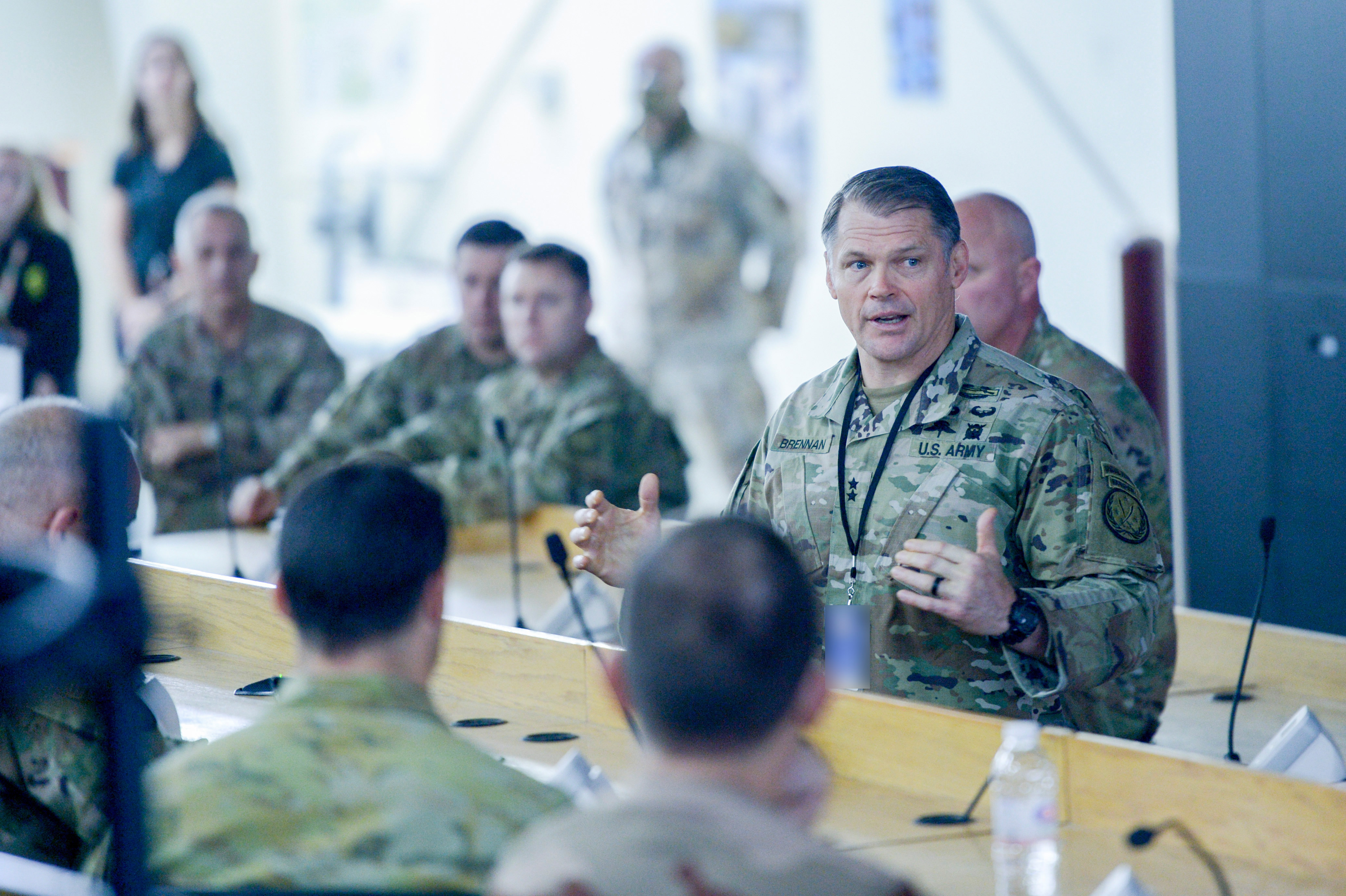
CJTF-OIR commander Major General John W. Brennan, Jr. holds a meeting with coalition personnel at Camp Arifjan, Kuwait, 28 January 2022

From August 2014 to August 2015, coalition aircraft flew a total of 45,259 sorties, with the U.S. Air Force flying the majority (67%) and dropped more than 5,600 bombs, the Royal Air Force conducted 30% of the airstrikes. At the time, The Guardian reported that a team of independent journalists had published details of 52 airstrikes which killed more than 450 civilians. The coalition acknowledged only 2 non-combatant deaths.

On 3 October 2015, Tunisia announced it would join CJTF–OIR.

By April 2017, CJTF-OIR estimated that it had killed 70,000 Islamic State fighters since 2014, with Special Operations Joint Task Force-Operation Inherent Resolve killing "over 21,000". The War Zone magazine estimated that SOJTF-OIR was responsible "for around 30 percent of all dead terrorists in Iraq and Syria", adding "we don't know whether SOJTF-OIR counts terrorists who died in air or artillery strikes its personnel called in among the task force's final count."

On 14 April 2017, members of SOJTF-OIR's headquarters element received new, distinctive patches, replacing the interim 1st Special Forces Group unit patch.

On 22 December 2018, three days after Donald Trump announced the U.S. would withdraw all its troops from Syria, Brett McGurk, the U.S. envoy to the coalition against ISIL, announced his resignation from his post.

In April 2019, a joint investigation by Amnesty International and Airwars reported that 1,600 civilians were killed by coalition airstrikes and U.S. artillery shelling during the four-month battle to capture the Syrian city of Raqqa from ISIL in 2017. The Coalition states it conducted 34,464 strikes against ISIL targets between 8 August 2014 and end of March 2019, and unintentionally killed at least 1,291 civilians.

Estonia will end its contribution to Operation Inherent Resolve by September 2025. At the time, it was Estonia's largest foreign military operation, with up to 110 troops (one infantry company) participating. Estonia will continue participating in the NATO Mission Iraq.

On 11 November 2025, Syrian Minister of Information Hamza al-Mustafa stated that the Syrian transitional government had joined the U.S.-led global coalition against ISIS, but would not join the coalition's military operations.

In March 2026, several NATO member states, including Croatia, Poland, and Spain, withdrew their personnel from the alliance's mission in Iraq, citing increased security risks due to escalating regional tensions linked to the Iran war. Coalition forces intercepted several drones above Erbil during the war.

On September 30, 2026, the last U.S. forces left Iraq; consequently, the CJTF-OIR headquarters was relocated to Jordan, where it coordinates operations against ISIS in Syria.

== See also ==
- International Security Assistance Force (ISAF)
- Multi-National Force – Iraq (MNF–I)
- Islamic terrorism in Europe
