= Special Operations Command Africa =

United States military command

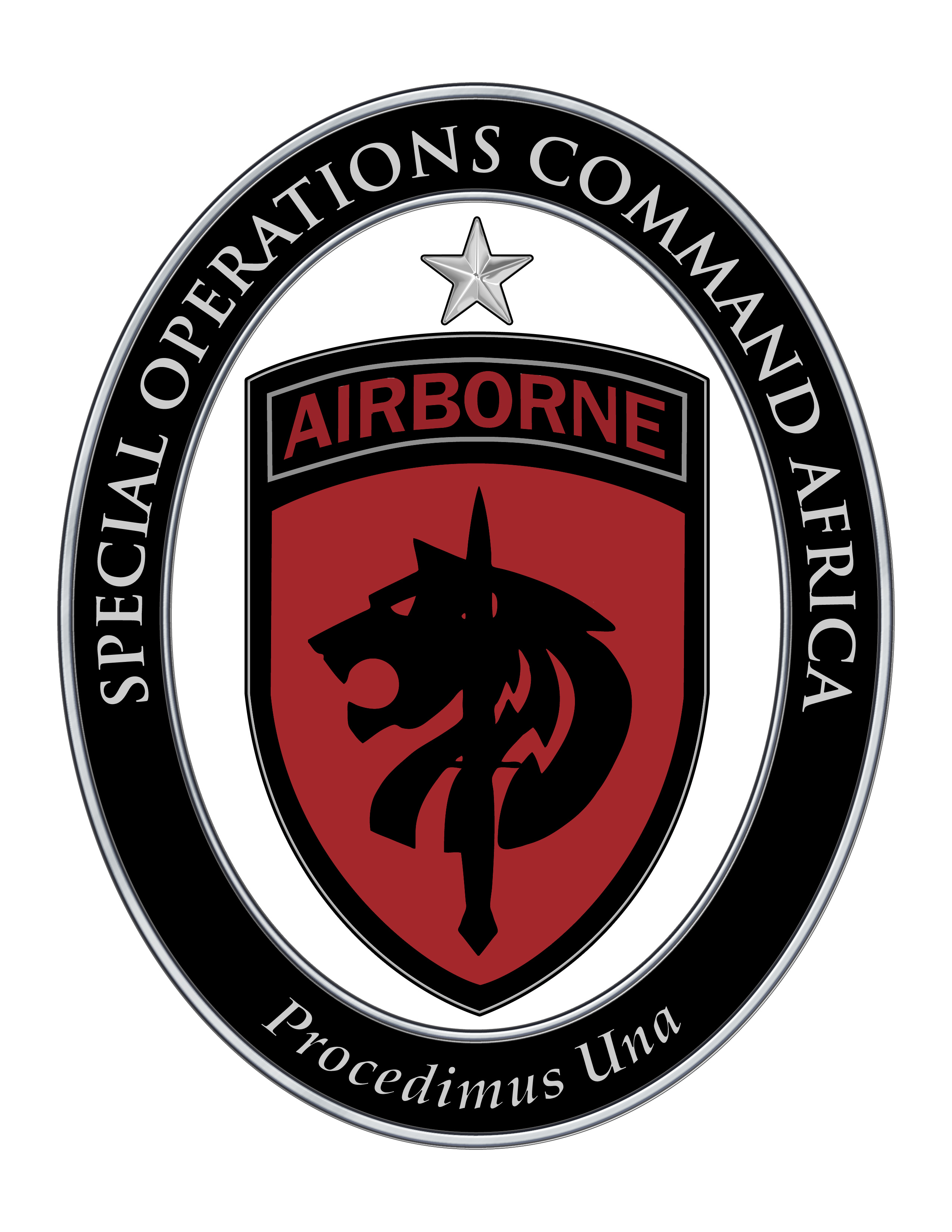
- Official SOCAFRICA logo
- Active: 2008 - present
- Country: United States
- Branch: United States Army
- Role: Special Operations
- Size: Command
- Garrison/HQ: Kelley Barracks, Stuttgart, Germany

Commanders
- Current commander: USAF MG Claude Tudor

Insignia
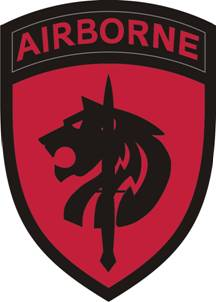
- SOCAFRICA Army Element's Shoulder Sleeve Insignia

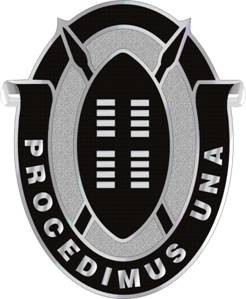
- SOCAFRICA Army Element's Distinctive Unit Insignia

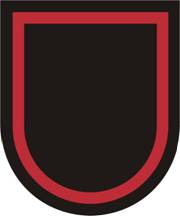
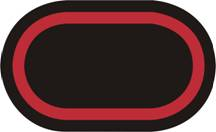
- SOCAFRICA Army Element's Beret Flash and Airborne Background Trimming

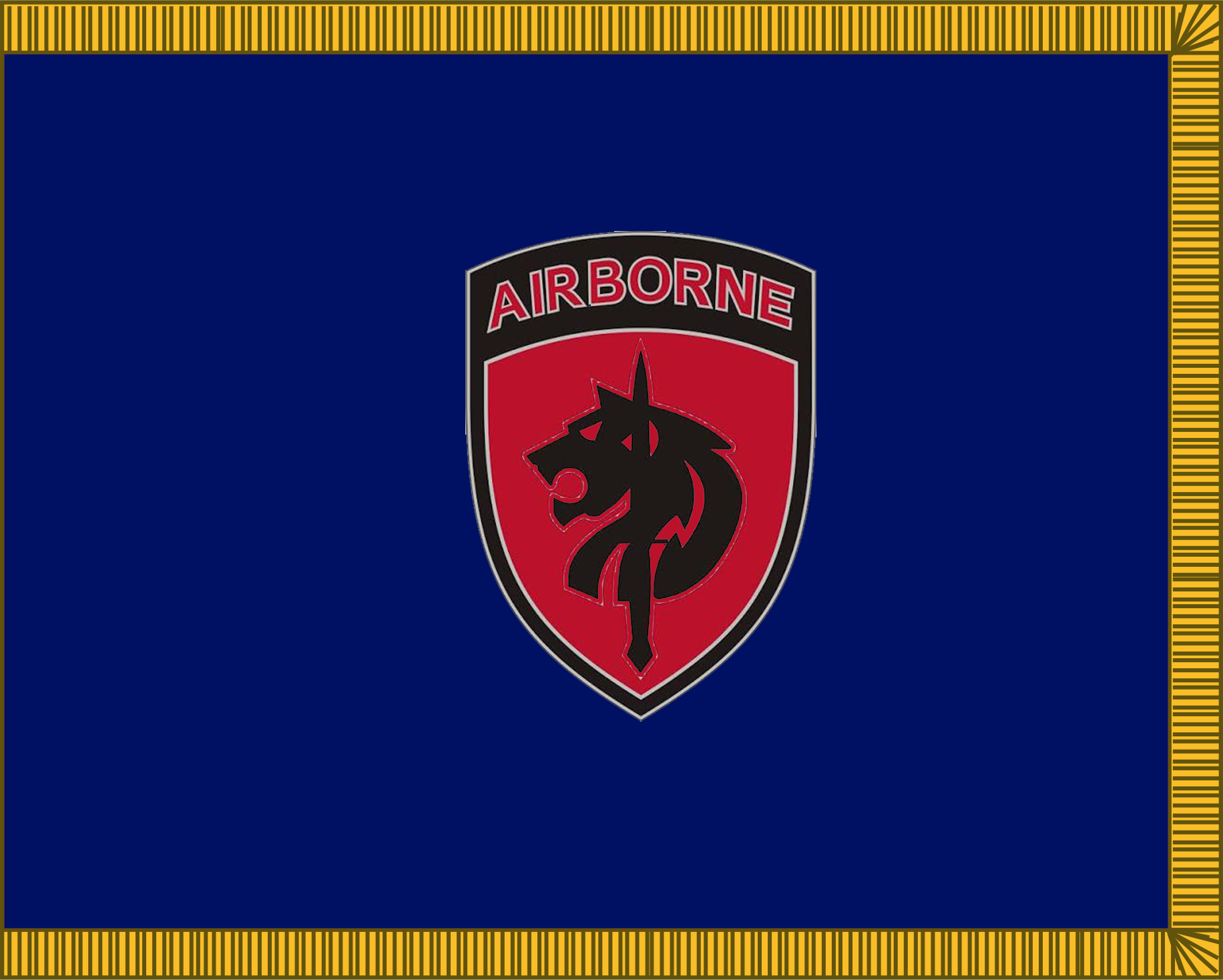
- Special Operations Command Africa Flag

Special Operations Command Africa (SOCAFRICA) is a subordinate unified command of United States Special Operations Command, operationally controlled by U.S. Africa Command, collocated with USAFRICOM at Kelley Barracks, Stuttgart-Möhringen, Germany. IT was activated on 1 October 2008 and became fully operationally capable on 1 October 2009. Also on 1 October 2008, SOCAFRICA assumed responsibility for the Special Operations Command and Control Element – Horn of Africa, and on 15 May 2009, SOCAFRICA assumed responsibility for Joint Special Operations Task Force Trans – Sahara (JSOTF-TS) – the SOF component of Operation Enduring Freedom – Trans Sahara.

== Objectives ==
SOCAFRICA's objectives are to build operational capacity, strengthen regional security and capacity initiatives, implement effective communication strategies in support of strategic objectives, and eradicate violent extremist organizations and their supporting networks. SOCAFRICA forces work closely with both U.S. Embassy country teams and African partners, maintaining a small but sustained presence throughout Africa, predominantly in the OEF-TS and CJTF-HOA regions. SOCAFRICA's persistent SOF presence provides an invaluable resource that furthers USG efforts to combat violent extremist groups and builds partner nation CT capacity.

On 8 April 2011, Naval Special Warfare Unit 10, operationally assigned and specifically dedicated for SOCAFRICA missions, was commissioned at Panzer Kaserne, near Stuttgart, Germany. It is administratively assigned to Naval Special Warfare Group 2 on the U.S. East Coast.

== Organization ==
Organizations included in SOCAFRICA include:

- Special Operations Command Forward—East (Special Operations Command and Control Element—Horn of Africa)
- Special Operations Command Forward—Central (AFRICOM Counter—Lord's Resistance Army Control Element)
- Special Operations Command Forward—West (Joint Special Operations Task Force—Trans Sahara)
- Naval Special Warfare Unit 10, Joint Special Operations Air Component Africa, and SOCAFRICA Signal Detachment
- Commander SOCAFRICA serves as the special operations adviser to commander, USAFRICOM.
