= Francis M. Beaudette =

U.S. Army officer

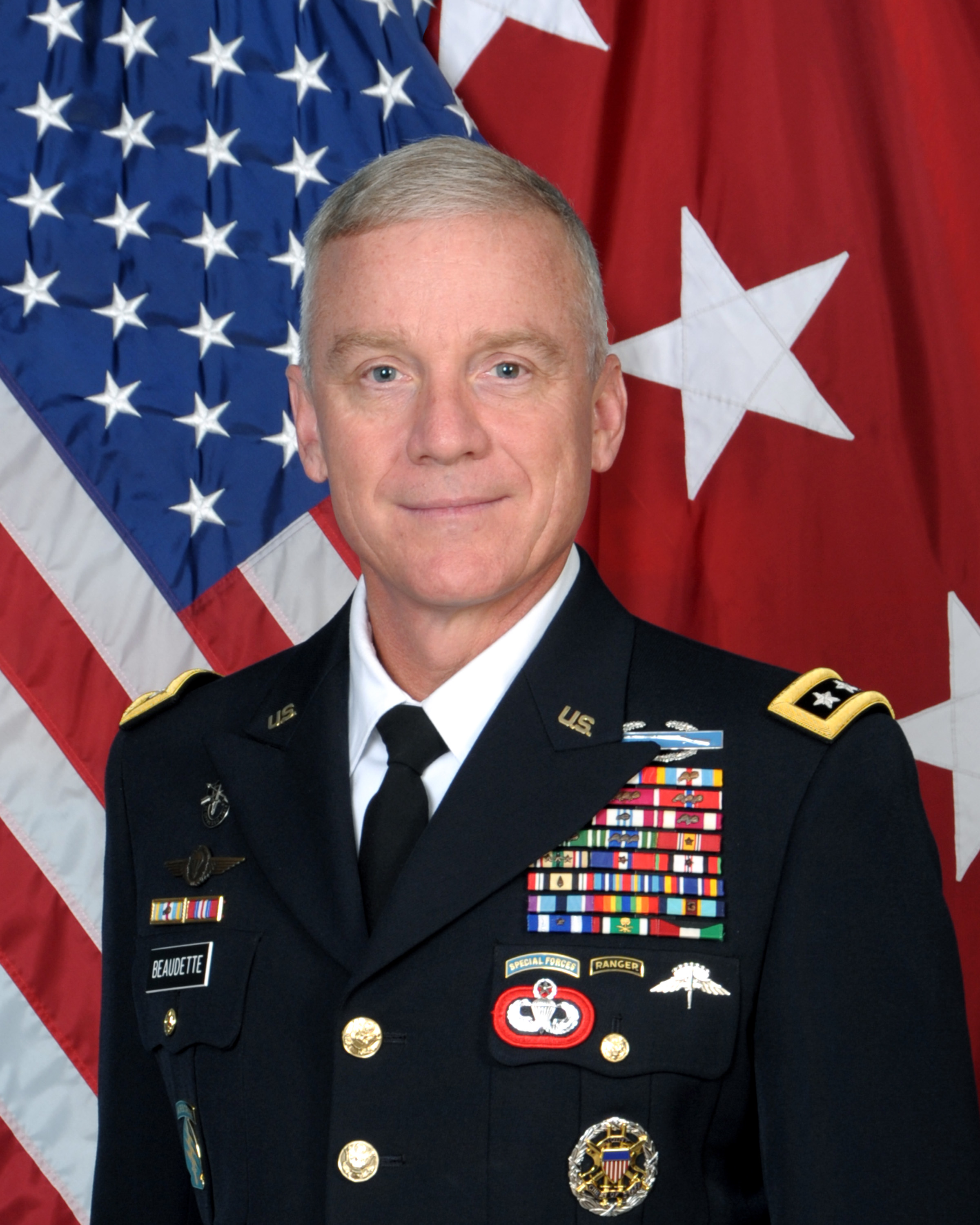
- Official portrait, 2018
- Military career
- Allegiance: United States
- Branch: United States Army
- Service years: 1989–2021
- Rank: Lieutenant General
- Commands: United States Army Special Operations Command; 1st Special Forces Command (Airborne); 1st Special Forces Group; 1st Battalion, 10th Special Forces Group; Special Operations Task Force 10; Joint Special Operations Task Force-Philippines
- Conflicts: Gulf War; Iraq War; War in Afghanistan
- Awards: Army Distinguished Service Medal; Defense Superior Service Medal (3); Legion of Merit (4); Bronze Star Medal (4)

Lieutenant General Francis Michel Beaudette is a retired United States Army officer who served as the commanding general of the United States Army Special Operations Command from 2018 to 2021.

== Military career ==
Francis M. Beaudette was commissioned in 1989 as an intelligence officer through the Reserve Officers' Training Corps program at The Citadel in Charleston, South Carolina. He initially served as a military intelligence officer, in his first assignment he served as a battalion assistant S-2, M1A1 crewmember, and armor platoon leader in Germany, Saudi Arabia and Iraq. He went on to complete Special Forces training in 1995. His first assignment was to the 3rd Special Forces Group (Airborne), where he commanded two Special Forces detachments, commanded the group headquarters company, and served as the group assistant S-3. He then served as the aide-de-camp to the commanding general of the John F. Kennedy Special Warfare Center and School, and went on to serve as aide-de-camp to the deputy commanding general of Kosovo Forces.

Beaudette commanded a Special Forces company at Fort Carson, Colorado, and in Kosovo, and also served as a battalion executive officer and group operations officer for the 10th Special Forces Group (Airborne), both at Fort Carson and in Iraq. Following a tour on the Joint Staff in the J3 Deputy Directorate for Special Operations, Beaudette commanded 1st Battalion, 10th Special Forces Group (Airborne) in Germany and Special Operations Task Force 10 in Afghanistan. He then served as the G3 and chief of staff for the United States Army Special Forces Command (Airborne), prior to commanding the 1st Special Forces Group (Airborne) and the Joint Special Operations Task Force – Philippines. Beaudette then served as the executive officer to the commander, United States Special Operations Command. Beaudette served as the deputy commanding general, 1st Armored Division and director of United States Central Command Forward (Jordan). He then served with Joint Special Operations Command as the assistant commanding general. Beaudette assumed command United States Army Special Operations Command on June 8, 2018. He relinquished command of USASOC to Jonathan P. Braga on August 13, 2021 and retired the same day.

Beaudette is a graduate of The Citadel, the United States Army Command and General Staff College and the United States Army War College.

== Awards and decorations ==
Combat Infantryman Badge
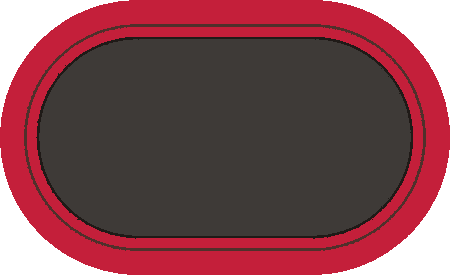
Master Parachutist Badge with USASOC background trimming
Military Free Fall Parachutist Badge
Special Forces Tab
Ranger tab
Joint Chiefs of Staff Identification Badge
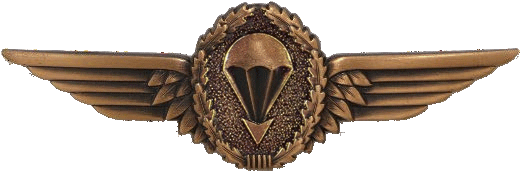
German Parachutist Badge in bronze
Canadian Jump Wings (non-operational)
Netherlands Jump Wings
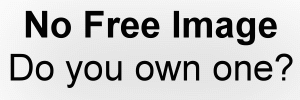
Swaziland Jump Wings
1st Special Forces Command (Airborne) Combat Service Identification Badge
1st Special Forces Command (Airborne) Distinctive Unit Insignia
6 Overseas Service Bars

Army Distinguished Service Medal
Defense Superior Service Medal with two bronze oak leaf clusters
Legion of Merit with three oak leaf clusters
Bronze Star Medal with three oak leaf clusters
Defense Meritorious Service Medal with oak leaf cluster
Meritorious Service Medal with two oak leaf clusters
Army Commendation Medal with three oak leaf clusters
Army Achievement Medal with three oak leaf clusters
Joint Meritorious Unit Award with oak leaf cluster
Valorous Unit Award
National Defense Service Medal with one bronze service star
Southwest Asia Service Medal with three campaign stars
Kosovo Campaign Medal with campaign star
Afghanistan Campaign Medal with campaign star
Iraq Campaign Medal with Arrowhead device
Global War on Terrorism Expeditionary Medal
Global War on Terrorism Service Medal
Humanitarian Service Medal
Army Service Ribbon
Army Overseas Service Ribbon with bronze award numeral 3
NATO Medal for ISAF with service star
Kuwait Liberation Medal (Saudi Arabia)
Kuwait Liberation Medal (Kuwait)

Military offices
Preceded by James E. Kraft Jr.	Commanding General of the 1st Special Forces Command (Airborne); 2017–2018	Succeeded by E. John Deedrick
Preceded by Kenneth E. Tovo	Commanding General of the United States Army Special Operations Command; 2018–2021	Succeeded by Jonathan P. Braga
