= United States Army Special Operations Command =

Army component of the U.S. Special Operations Command

United States Army Special Operations Command (Airborne)
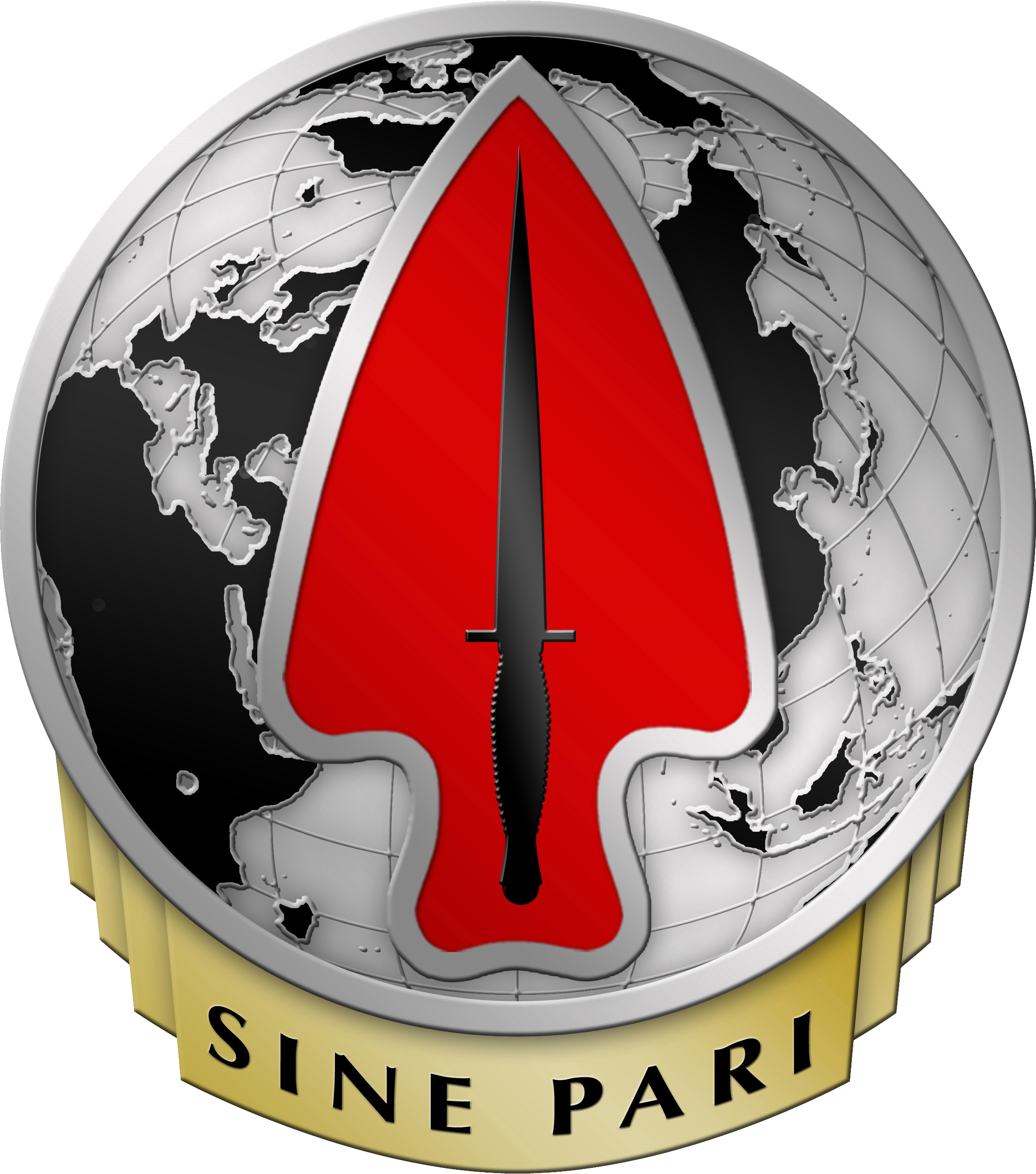
- Distinctive unit insignia of USASOC Headquarters
- Founded: 1 December 1989; 36 years ago
- Country: United States of America
- Branch: United States Army
- Type: Special warfare operations
- Role: Organize, train, educate, man, equip, fund, administer, mobilize, deploy and sustain U.S. Army special operations forces to successfully conduct worldwide special warfare operations.
- Size: 33,805 personnel authorized: 32,552 military personnel; 1,253 civilian personnel
- Part of: U.S. Special Operations Command
- Headquarters: Fort Bragg, North Carolina, U.S.
- Motto: "Sine Pari" (Without Equal)
- Color of Beret: Tan Maroon Rifle green
- Engagements: Invasion of Panama; Persian Gulf War; Unified Task Force; Operation Gothic Serpent: Battle of Mogadishu; Operation Uphold Democracy; War on terror: War in Afghanistan; Iraq War
- Website: Official Website

Commanders
- Current commander: LTG Lawrence G. Ferguson
- Notable commanders: LTG Jonathan P. Braga; LTG Francis M. Beaudette; LTG Kenneth E. Tovo; Robert W. Wagner; Edward M. Reeder Jr. John F. Mulholland Jr. Charles T. Cleveland

Insignia
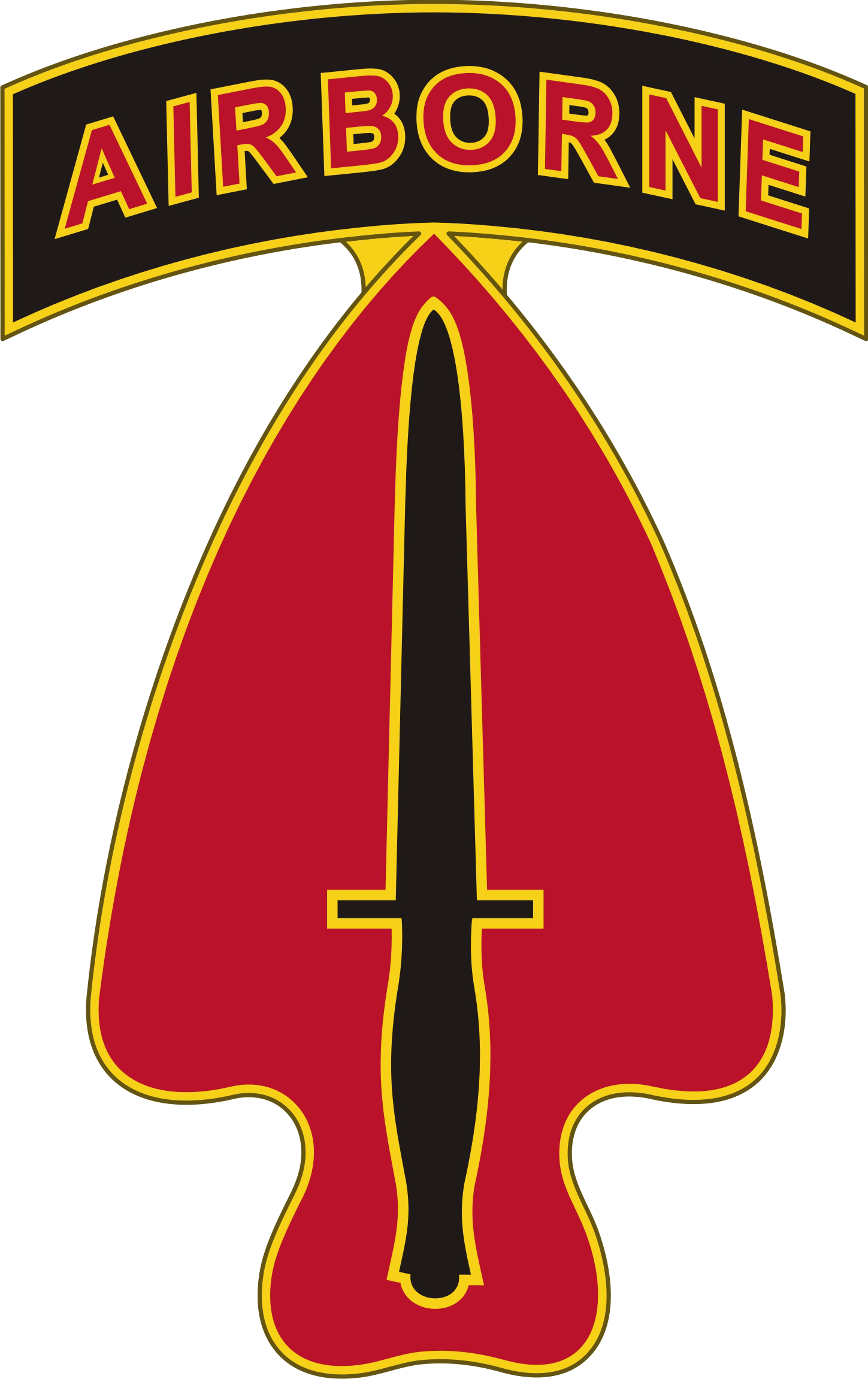
- Combat service identification badge (metallic version of USASOC"s shoulder sleeve insignia): The stylized spearhead alludes to the SSI worn by the 1st Special Service Force and signifies the heritage and traditions of USASOC. The unsheathed Fairbairn–Sykes fighting knife symbolizes total military preparedness and has long been associated with Army special operation forces.

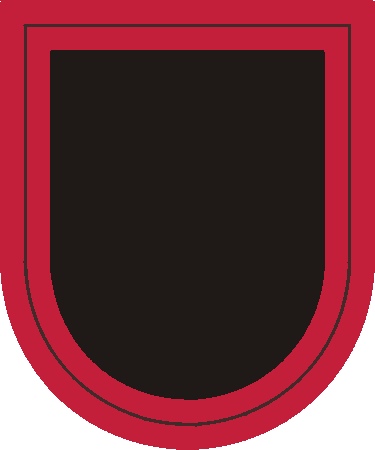
- Beret flash of the command

A historical overview of U.S. Army Special Operations Forces—prior to the creation of USASOC, circa 1984 (51:52)

The United States Army Special Operations Command (Airborne) (USASOC) is the command charged with overseeing the various special operations forces of the United States Army. Headquartered at Fort Bragg, North Carolina, it is the largest component of the United States Special Operations Command. It is an Army Service Component Command. Its mission is to organize, train, educate, man, equip, fund, administer, mobilize, deploy and sustain Army special operations forces to successfully conduct worldwide special operations.

== Subordinate units ==
=== 1st Special Forces Command (Airborne) ===
Army Special Forces CSIB

The 1st Special Forces Command (Airborne) is a division-level special operation forces command within the US Army Special Operations Command. The command was established on 30 September 2014, grouping together the Army special forces, psychological operations, civil affairs, and other support troops into a single organization operating out of its new headquarters building at Fort Bragg, NC.

==== Special Forces Groups ====
Established in 1952, the Special Forces Groups, also known as the Green Berets, was established as a special operations force of the United States Army designed to deploy and execute nine doctrinal missions: unconventional warfare, foreign internal defense, direct action, counter-insurgency, special reconnaissance, counter-terrorism, information operations, counterproliferation of weapon of mass destruction, and security force assistance. These missions make special forces unique in the U.S. military because they are employed throughout the three stages of the operational continuum: peacetime, conflict, and war. Often SF units are required to perform additional, or collateral, activities outside their primary missions. These collateral activities are coalition warfare/support, combat search and rescue, security assistance, peacekeeping, humanitarian assistance, humanitarian de-mining, and counter-drug operations. Their unconventional warfare capabilities provide a viable military option for a variety of operational taskings that are inappropriate or infeasible for conventional forces, making it the U.S. military's premier unconventional warfare force.

Today, there are seven special forces groups, each one is primarily responsible for operations within a specific area of responsibility:

- 1st Special Forces Group (Airborne) (USINDOPACOM)
- 3rd Special Forces Group (Airborne) (AFRICOM)
- 5th Special Forces Group (Airborne) (CENTCOM)
- 7th Special Forces Group (Airborne) (USSOUTHCOM)
- 10th Special Forces Group (Airborne) (EUCOM)
- 19th Special Forces Group (Airborne) (ARNG), (USINDOPACOM) and (CENTCOM)
- 20th Special Forces Group (Airborne) (ARNG), (USSOUTHCOM)

==== Psychological Operations Groups ====
The mission of the 4th Psychological Operations Group (Airborne), a.k.a. PSYOP units, are to provide fully capable strategic influence forces to Combatant Commanders, U.S. Ambassadors, and other agencies to synchronize plans and execute inform and influence activities across the range of military operations via geographically focused PSYOP battalions.

4th PSYOP Group (A) consists of five battalions:

- 1st PSYOP Battalion (USSOUTHCOM)
- 5th PSYOP Battalion (USINDOPACOM)
- 6th PSYOP Battalion (USEUCOM)
- 7th PSYOP Battalion (USAFRICOM)
- 8th PSYOP Battalion (USCENTCOM)
- 9th PSYOP Battalion (Tactical).

Psychological operations are a part of the broad range of U.S. political, military, economic and ideological activities used by the U.S. government to secure national objectives. Used during peacetime, contingencies, and declared war, these activities are not forms of force but are force multipliers that use nonviolent means in often violent environments. Persuading rather than compelling physically, they rely on logic, fear, desire, or other mental factors to promote specific emotions, attitudes or behaviors.

The ultimate objective of U.S. PSYOP is to convince enemy, neutral, and friendly nations and forces to take action favorable to the United States and its allies. The ranks of the PSYOP include regional experts and linguists who understand political, cultural, ethnic, and religious subtleties and use persuasion to influence perceptions and encourage desired behavior. With functional experts in all aspects of tactical communications, PSYOP offers joint force commanders unmatched abilities to influence target audiences as well as strategic influence capabilities to U.S. diplomacy.

In addition to supporting commanders, PSYOP units provide interagency strategic influence capabilities to other U.S. government agencies. In operations ranging from humanitarian assistance to drug interdiction, PSYOP enhances the impact of those agencies' actions. Their activities can be used to spread information about ongoing programs and to gain support from the local populace.

==== 95th Civil Affairs Brigade (Special Operations) (Airborne) ====
The 95th Civil Affairs Brigade (Special Operations) (Airborne) enables military commanders and U.S. Ambassadors to improve relationships with various stakeholders in a local area to meet the objectives of the U.S. government. 95th Civil Affairs Brigade (Airborne) teams work with U.S. Department of State country teams, government and nongovernmental organizations at all levels and with local populations in peaceful, contingency and hostile environments. 95th Civil Affairs Brigade (Airborne) units can rapidly deploy to remote areas with small villages and larger population centers around the world.

They help host nations assess the needs of an area, bring together local and non-local resources to ensure long-term stability, and ultimately degrade and defeat violent extremist organizations and their ideologies. They may be involved in disaster prevention, management, and recovery, and with human and civil infrastructure assistance programs.

The 95th Civil Affairs Brigade (Airborne) conducts its mission via five geographically focused operational battalions:

- 91st Civil Affairs Battalion (USAFRICOM)
- 92nd Civil Affairs Battalion (EUCOM)
- 96th Civil Affairs Battalion (USCENTCOM)
- 97th Civil Affairs Battalion (USINDOPACOM)
- 98th Civil Affairs Battalion (USSOUTHCOM)

The soldiers in these units are adept at working in foreign environments and conversing in one of about 20 foreign languages with local stakeholders. Brigade teams may work for months or years in remote areas of a host nation. Their low profile and command structure allow them to solidify key relationships and processes, to address root causes of instability that adversely affect the strategic interests of the United States.

==== 528th Sustainment Brigade (Special Operations) (Airborne) ====
The 528th Sustainment Brigade (SO) (A) is responsible for providing logistical, medical, signal, and intelligence support for Army special operations forces worldwide in support of contingency missions and war fighting commanders. Headquartered at Fort Bragg, North Carolina, the 528th Sustainment Brigade (SO) (A) sets the operational level logistics conditions to enable Army Special Operation Forces (ARSOF) using multiple Support Operations teams and three battalions.

The Support Operations teams embed each regional theaters' staff to support planning and coordination with theater Army, U.S. Special Operations Command and U.S. Army Special Operations Command to ensure support during operations and training. Support Operations consists of four detachments: current operations, which manages five geographically aligned ARSOF Liaison Elements (ALEs), a future operations detachment, a commodity managers detachment, and an ARSOF support operations element.

The 528th Support Battalion provides rapidly deployable combat service support and health service support to ARSOF and consists of a headquarters company with an organic rigger detachment, a special operations medical detachment with four Austere Resuscitative Surgical Teams (ARSTs), the 197th Special Troops Support Company from the Texas Army National Guard, and 1/528th Forward Support Company from the West Virginia Army National Guard.

The 112th Special Operations Signal Battalion specializes in communication, employing innovative telecommunications technologies to provide Special Operations Joint Task Force (SOJTF) commanders with secure and nonsecure voice, data and video services. The 112th's signals expertise allows ARSOF to "shoot, move and communicate" on a continuous basis. Soldiers assigned to 112th are taught to operate and maintain a vast array of unique equipment not normally used by their conventional counterparts. To meet the needs of ARSOF, the 112th deploys communications packages that are rapidly deployable on a moment's notice. Soldiers assigned to 112th are airborne qualified.

The 389th Military Intelligence Battalion was established in March 2015 and conducts command and control of multi-disciplined intelligence operations in support of the 1st Special Forces Command (A) G2, component subordinate units, and mission partners via three companies: a headquarters company; an Analytical Support Company with a cytological support element and five geographically aligned regional support teams; a Mission Support Company with a Processing, Exploitation, and Dissemination (PED) detachment, a HUMINT and GEOINT detachment, and conducts the Special Warfare SIGINT Course; and an additional PED detachment at Fort Gordon. On order, it deploys and conducts intelligence operations as part of a Special Operations Joint Task Force (SOJTF).

=== U.S. Army Special Operations Aviation Command (Airborne) ===
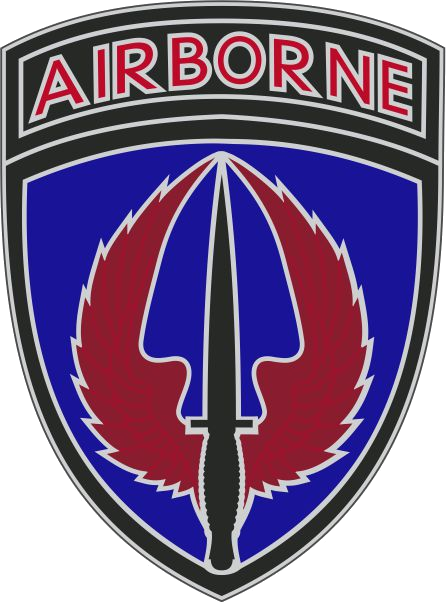
Special Operations Aviation Command CSIB

The U.S. Army Special Operations Aviation Command (USASOAC), activated on 25 March 2011, organizes, mans, trains, resources and equips Army special operations aviation units to provide responsive, special operations aviation support to Special Operations Forces (SOF) and is the USASOC aviation staff proponent. Today, USASOAC consists of five distinct units: the 160th Special Operations Aviation Regiment (Airborne), the USASOC Flight Company (UFC), the Special Operations Aviation Training Battalion (SOATB), the Technology Applications Program Office (TAPO), and the Systems Integration Management Office (SIMO).

The 160th Special Operations Aviation Regiment (Airborne), newly subordinate to ARSOAC, provides aviation support to special operations forces. Known as "Night Stalkers," these soldiers are recognized for their proficiency in nighttime operations striking undetected during the hours of darkness and are recognized as the pioneers of the US Army's nighttime flying techniques. Today, Night Stalkers continue developing and employing new technology and tactics, techniques and procedures for the battlefield. They employ highly modified heavy assault versions of the MH-47 Chinook, medium assault and attack versions of the MH-60 Black Hawk, light assault and attack versions of the MH-6 Little Bird helicopters, and MQ-1C Gray Eagles via four battalions, two Extended-Range Multi-Purpose (ERMP) companies, a headquarters company, and a training company. The 1st Battalion, 2nd Battalion, the regiment, and its ERMP companies are stationed at Fort Campbell, 3rd Battalion is at Hunter Army Airfield, and 4th Battalion is at Joint Base Lewis–McChord.

=== 75th Ranger Regiment ===
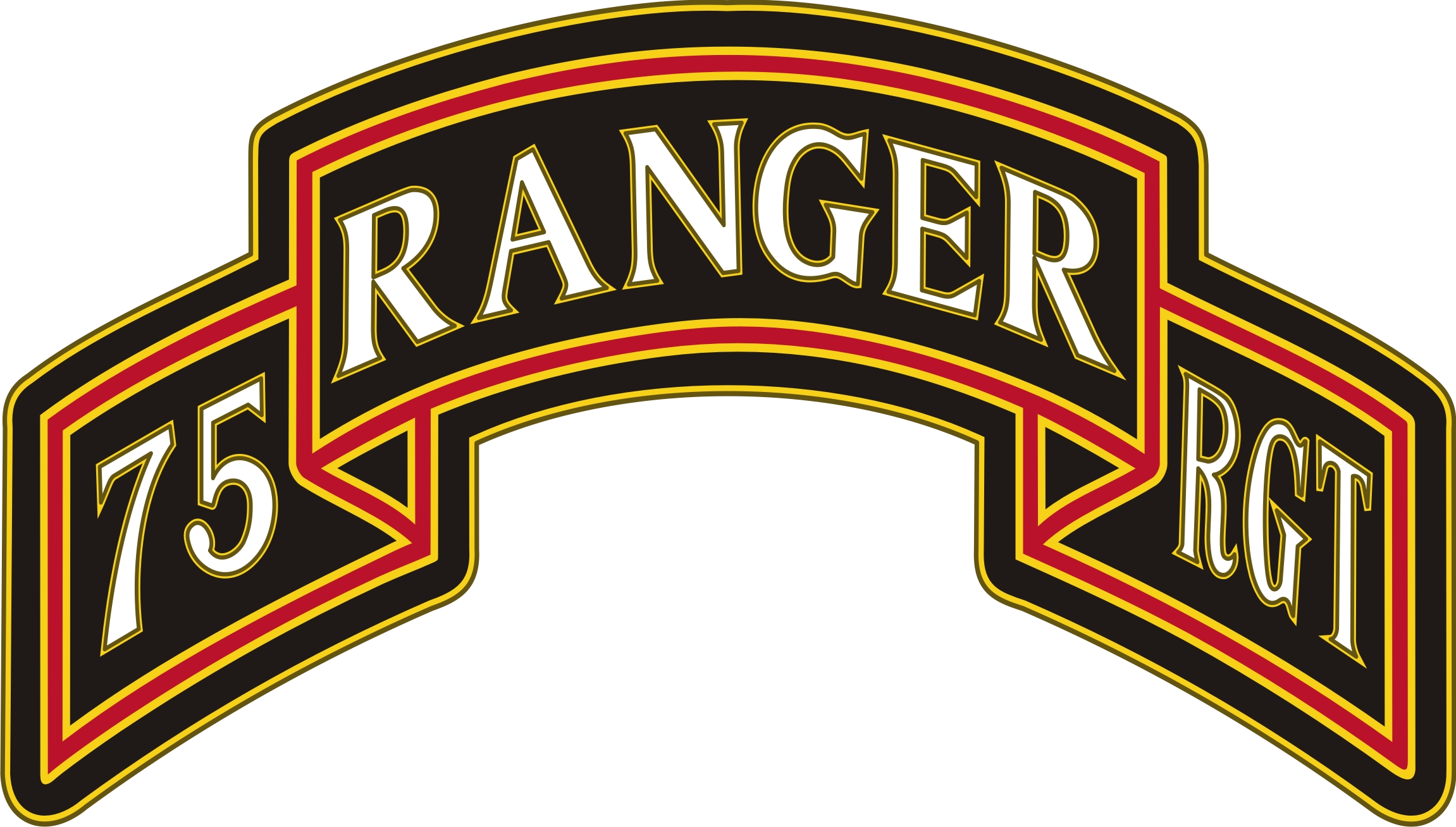
75th Ranger Regiment CSIB (each BN has its own)

The 75th Ranger Regiment, also known as the Rangers, is an airborne light-infantry special operations unit. The regiment is headquartered at Fort Benning, Georgia and is composed of a regimental airborne special troops battalion, a regimental airborne military intelligence battalion, and three airborne light-infantry battalions. The 1st Ranger Battalion is stationed at Hunter Army Airfield, 2nd Ranger Battalion at Joint Base Lewis–McChord, and 3rd Ranger Battalion is at Fort Benning along with the special troops battalion, the military intelligence battalion, and regimental headquarters.

Within the US special operations community, the 75th Ranger Regiment is unique with its ability to attack heavily defended targets of interest. The regiment specializes in air assault, direct action raids, seizure of key terrain (such as airfields), destroying strategic facilities, and capturing or killing high-profile individuals. Each battalion of the regiment can deploy anywhere in the world within 18 hours' notice. Rangers can conduct squad through regimental-size operations using a variety of insertion techniques including airborne, air assault, and ground infiltration. The regiment is an all-volunteer force with an intensive screening and selection process followed by combat-focused training. Rangers are resourced to maintain exceptional proficiency, experience and readiness.

=== U.S. Army John F. Kennedy Special Warfare Center and School ===
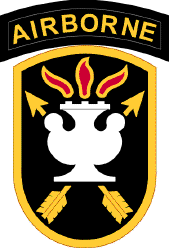
JFK Special Warfare Center and School shoulder sleeve insignia

The U.S. Army John F. Kennedy Special Warfare Center and School (SWCS) at Fort Bragg, North Carolina, is the Army's premier education institution, managing professional growth for soldiers in the Army's three distinct special-operations branches: Special Forces, Civil Affairs and Psychological Operations. The soldiers educated through SWCS programs are reported to be using cultural expertise and unconventional techniques to serve their country in far-flung areas across the globe.

On any given day, approximately 3,100 students are enrolled in SWCS training programs. Courses range from entry-level training to advanced warfighter skills for seasoned officers and NCOs. The 1st Special Warfare Training Group (Airborne) qualifies soldiers to enter the special operations community. The 2nd Special Warfare Training Group (Airborne) focuses on teaches special operators advanced tactical skills as they progress through their careers. The Joint Special Operations Medical Training Center, operating under the auspices of the Special Warfare Medical Group, is the central training facility for the Department of Defense special operations combat medics. Furthermore, SWCS leads efforts to professionalize the Army's entire special operations force through the Special Forces Warrant Officer Institute and the David K. Thuma Noncommissioned Officer Academy. While most courses are conducted at Fort Bragg, SWCS enhances its training by maintaining facilities and relationships with outside institutions across the country.

=== 1st Special Forces Operational Detachment-Delta ===
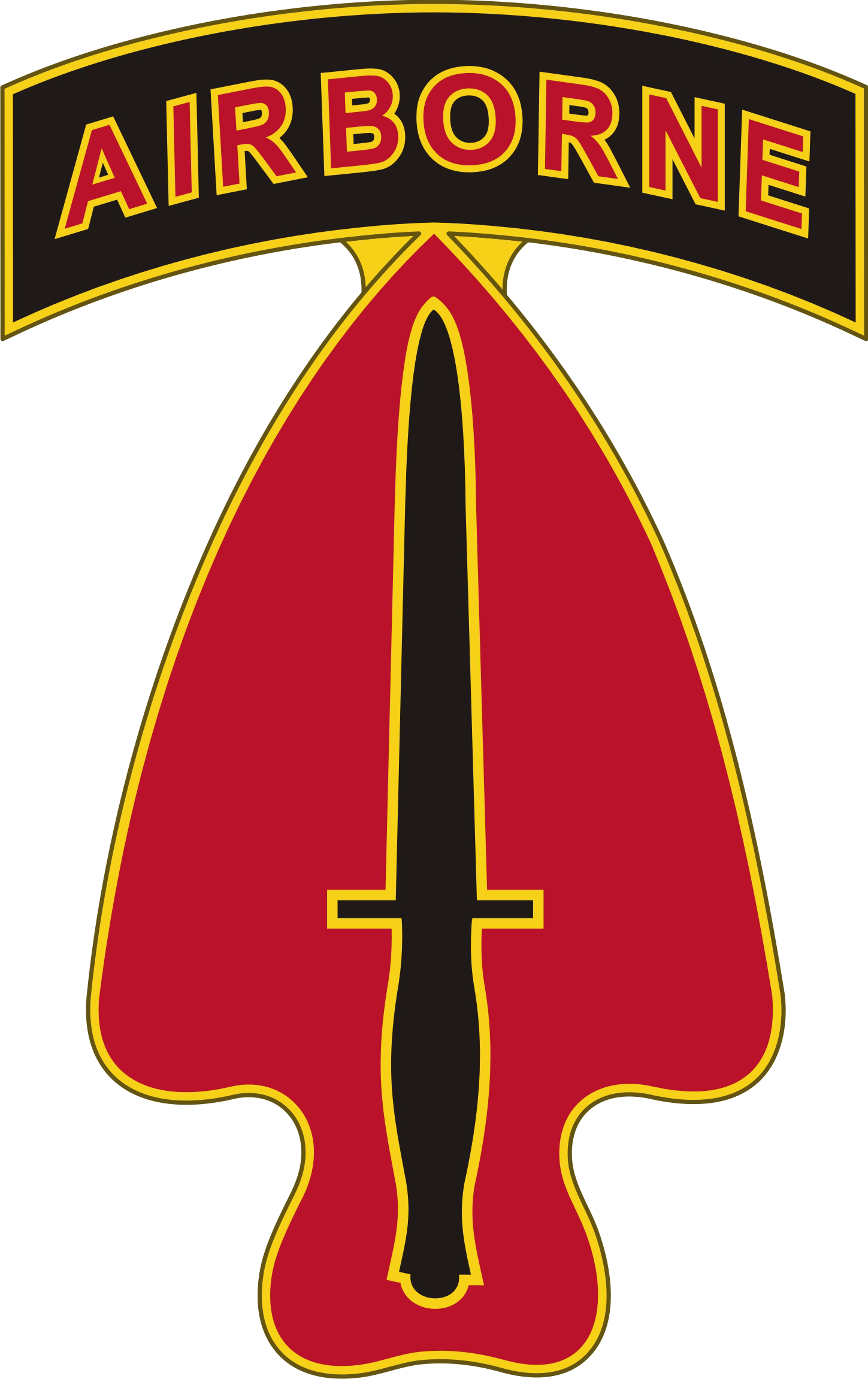
The USASOC CSIB is also worn by 1st SFOD-D/Task Force Green soldiers

The 1st Special Forces Operational Detachment-Delta (1st SFOD-D), commonly referred to as Delta Force, Combat Applications Group (CAG), "The Unit", Army Compartmented Element, or within the Joint Special Operations Command (JSOC) as Task Force Green, is an elite special mission unit of the United States Army, under the organization of USASOC, but controlled by JSOC. It is used for hostage rescue and counterterrorism, as well as direct action and reconnaissance against high-value targets. 1st SFOD-D and its U.S. Navy and U.S. Air Force counterparts, DEVGRU, "SEAL Team 6", and the 24th Special Tactics Squadron, perform the most highly complex and dangerous missions in the U.S. military. These units are also often referred to as "Tier One" and "special mission units" by the U.S. government.

== Order of Battle ==
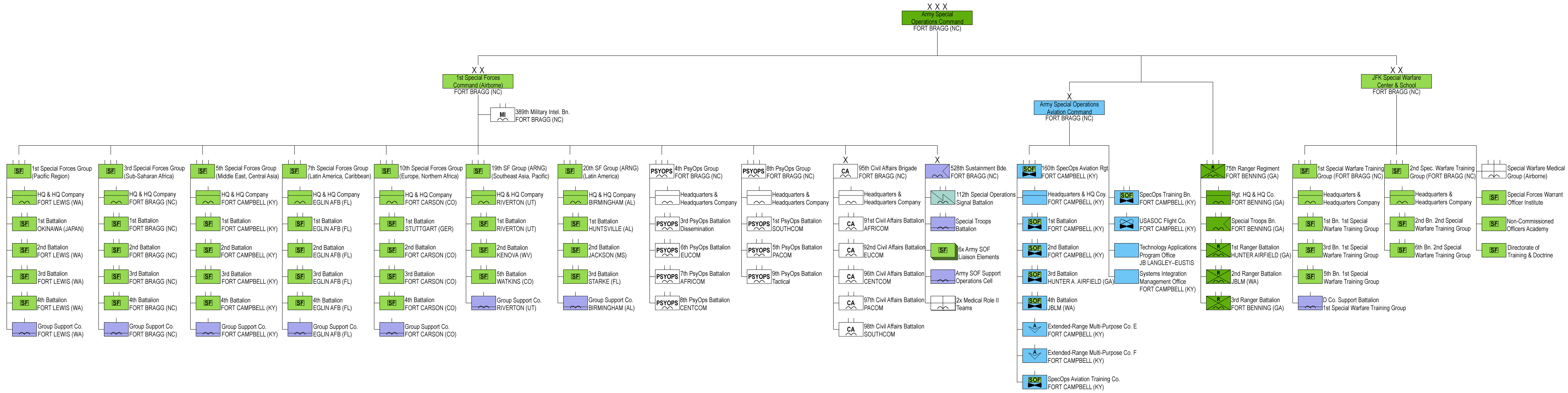
Structure of the Army Special Operations Command in 2020

== List of commanding generals ==
| No. | Commanding General | | Term | | |
| No. | Portrait | Name | Took office | Left office | Term length |
|---|---|---|---|---|---|
| 1 | Gary E. Luck | Lieutenant General; Gary E. Luck (born 1937) | 1 December 1989 | June 1990 | ~182 days |
| 2 | Michael F. Spigelmire | Lieutenant General; Michael F. Spigelmire (born 1938) | June 1990 | August 1991 | ~1 year, 61 days |
| 3 | Wayne A. Downing | Lieutenant General; Wayne A. Downing (1940–2007) | August 1991 | May 1993 | ~1 year, 273 days |
| 4 | James T. Scott | Lieutenant General; James T. Scott (born 1942) | May 1993 | October 1996 | ~3 years, 153 days |
| 5 | Peter Schoomaker | Lieutenant General; Peter Schoomaker (born 1946) | October 1996 | October 1997 | ~1 year, 0 days |
| 6 | William P. Tangney | Lieutenant General; William P. Tangney | October 1997 | 11 October 2000 | ~3 years, 10 days |
| 7 | Bryan D. Brown | Lieutenant General; Bryan D. Brown (born 1948) | 11 October 2000 | 29 August 2002 | 1 year, 322 days |
| 8 | Philip R. Kensinger Jr. | Lieutenant General; Philip R. Kensinger Jr. | 29 August 2002 | 8 December 2005 | 3 years, 101 days |
| 9 | Robert W. Wagner | Lieutenant General; Robert W. Wagner | 8 December 2005 | 7 November 2008 | 2 years, 335 days |
| 10 | John F. Mulholland Jr. | Lieutenant General; John F. Mulholland Jr. (born 1955) | 7 November 2008 | 24 July 2012 | 3 years, 260 days |
| 11 | Charles T. Cleveland | Lieutenant General; Charles T. Cleveland (born 1956) | 24 July 2012 | 1 July 2015 | 2 years, 342 days |
| 12 | Kenneth E. Tovo | Lieutenant General; Kenneth E. Tovo (born 1961) | 1 July 2015 | 8 June 2018 | 2 years, 342 days |
| 13 | Francis M. Beaudette | Lieutenant General; Francis M. Beaudette | 8 June 2018 | 13 August 2021 | 3 years, 66 days |
| 14 | Jonathan P. Braga | Lieutenant General; Jonathan P. Braga (born 1969) | 13 August 2021 | 24 September 2025 | 4 years, 42 days |
| - | Kirk E. Brinker | Brigadier General; Kirk E. Brinker; Acting | 24 September 2025 | 3 November 2025 | 40 days |
| 15 | Lawrence G. Ferguson | Lieutenant General; Lawrence G. Ferguson | 3 November 2025 | Incumbent | 1 year, 1 day |
