= Military Strategy in the 21st Century =

2018 non-fiction academic book

Military Strategy in the 21st Century: People, Connectivity, and Competition
- Author: Charles T. Cleveland, Benjamin Jensen, Susan Bryant, Arnel P. David
- Publisher: Cambria Press
- Publication date: June 2018
- ISBN: 9781604979473

Military Strategy in the 21st Century: People, Connectivity, and Competition is a 2018 non-fiction academic book written by military officers who were at the time serving in the Chief of Staff of the Army’s Strategic Studies Group: Charles T. Cleveland, Benjamin Jensen, Susan Bryant, and Arnel David.

== Synopsis ==
The book addresses how U.S. national security practitioners approach population-centric warfare and strategic competition in the 21st century. The authors argue that strategic advantage can be achieved from mapping human geography in a connected world, leveraging key relationships, and combining unconventional (special operations) and conventional methods to put adversaries on the horns of a dilemma.

The Wavell Room described the book's aim "as an attempt to raise awareness that the human domain – how we articulate it and conceptualise this idea – should be considered as not only a warfighting function in itself, but one that is crucial for success for any military force."
