= Jonathan P. Braga =

US Army general (born 1969)

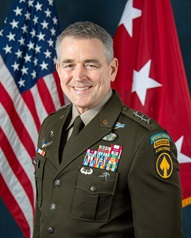
- Born: June 19, 1969 (age 57); Attleboro, Massachusetts, U.S.
- Military career
- Allegiance: United States
- Branch: United States Army
- Service years: 1991–present
- Rank: Lieutenant General
- Nickname: Jon
- Commands: Joint Special Operations Command; United States Army Special Operations Command; Special Operations Command Pacific; JSOC – Army Pacific; 7th Special Forces Group; Delta Force
- Conflicts: War in Afghanistan; Iraq War; Operation Inherent Resolve
- Awards: Army Distinguished Service Medal; Defense Superior Service Medal (3); Legion of Merit (2); Bronze Star Medal (4)

Jonathan Patrick Braga (born 19 June 1969) is a United States Army lieutenant general, serving as the commanding general of Joint Special Operations Command since 26 September 2025. He previously served as commanding general of the United States Army Special Operations Command from 13 August 2021 to 26 September 2025. and before that as a deputy commanding general of United States Army Pacific from August 2020 to July 2021 and as commander of Special Operations Command Pacific from July 2018 to August 2020. He also served as operations director of Operation Inherent Resolve, the official name for the US war on ISIS.

On 12 August 2021, he was promoted to lieutenant general and assumed command of the United States Army Special Operations Command one day later, succeeding Francis M. Beaudette. Then, on 2 September 2025, he was nominated for reappointment to lieutenant general and assumed command of the Joint Special Operations Command over three weeks later, succeeding Frank M. Bradley.

== Military career ==
Braga graduated from the United States Military Academy at West Point, New York with a Bachelor of Science degree in national security public affairs, and was commissioned as a second lieutenant into the Infantry Branch in 1991. His first assignment was rifle platoon leader with the 2nd Infantry Division, Eighth Army in South Korea, followed by service with the 11th Armored Cavalry Regiment at Fort Irwin, California. He then attended Army Special Forces Qualification Course and served with the 7th Special Forces Group from 1995 to 2001 as Operational Detachment-Alpha (ODA) commander, Company Executive officer and Company commander. In 2002 Braga volunteered for and completed a specialized selection and operator training course for assignment to 1st Special Forces Operational Detachment-Delta at Fort Bragg, North Carolina. He would serve numerous leadership positions as squadron operations officer and troop commander with deployments during Operation Enduring Freedom, Operation Iraqi Freedom and Operation WILLING SPIRIT until 2005. Braga earned a master's degree from the Naval Command and Staff College, Naval War College in 2006 and transferred to Joint Special Operations Command (JSOC) in Washington, D.C. Braga returned to United States Army Special Operations Command at Fort Bragg in 2008 and served as operations officer, Squadron Commander and Deputy Unit Commander.

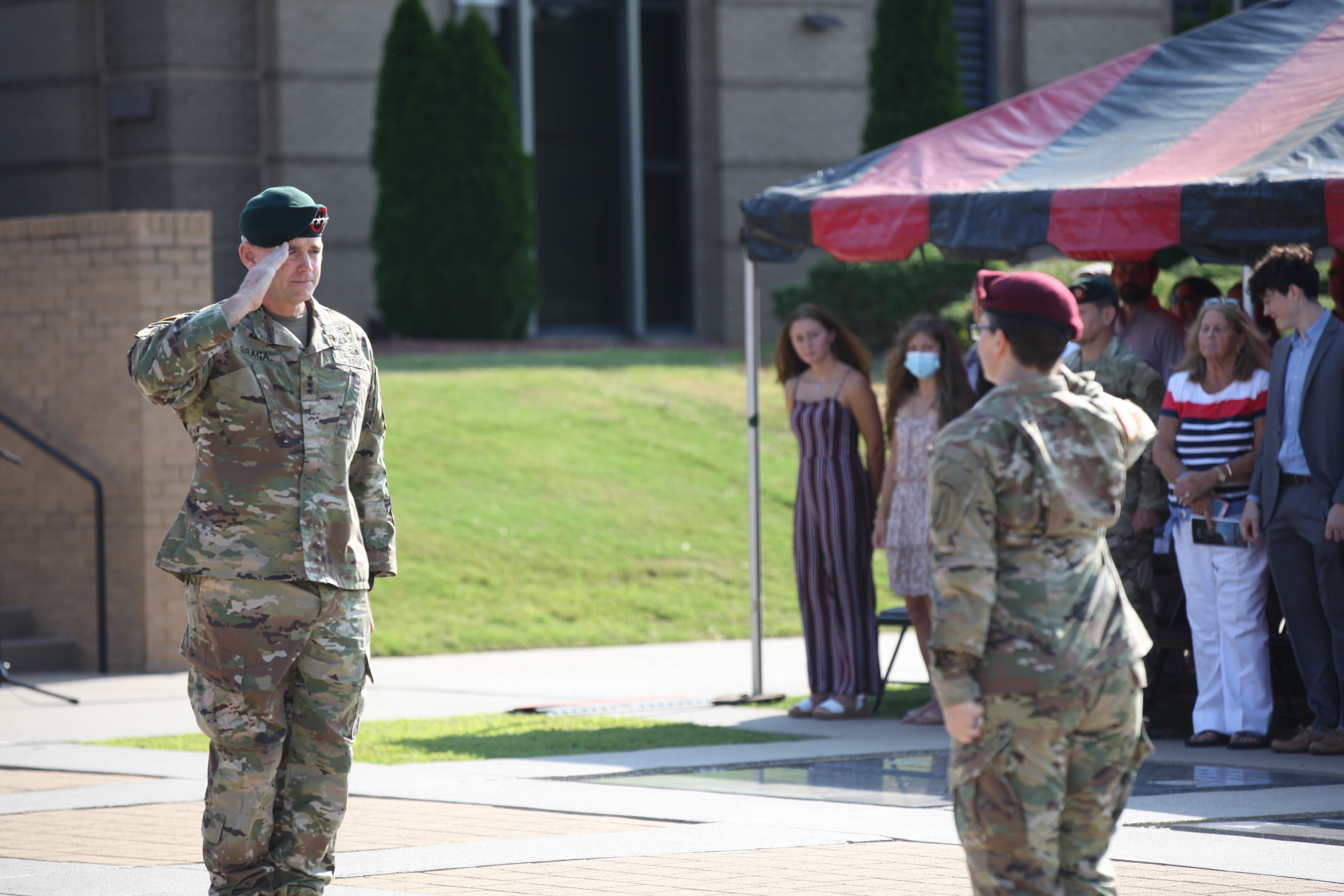
Lt. Gen. Jonathan P. Braga assumes command of U.S. Army Special Operations Command, during a ceremony at Fort Bragg, 13 August 2021

Braga's most recent assignments include: Army War College Special Operations Fellow at the Naval Postgraduate School, Garrison Commander of the National Training Center in Fort Irwin from 2013 to 2015; Chief of Staff at Joint Special Operations Command from 2015 to 2017 and Director of Operations, Combined Joint Task Force—Operation Inherent Resolve (CJTF-OIR) in Iraq. Braga assumed command as Commander, Special Operations Command, Pacific on 27 July 2018.

Braga praised the collaboration with Kurdish troops on the ground during Operation Inherent resolve:

I'm very impressed. These people stood up without any international support. [...] It's the partnership we wished for, but never had, [...] I think the world owes them a debt of gratitude. They were the first to stand up against [ISIS].

— Jonathan P. Braga, 30 March 2018

In the spring of 2020, as the COVID-19 pandemic was rapidly worsening, Braga reportedly led an anti-vax propaganda campaign in the Philippines. The disinformation campaign was targeted against the Chinese-produced vaccine Sinovac CoronaVac, and intended to undermine a possible increase of Chinese influence in the country. The campaign was described as "payback" for COVID-19 disinformation by China directed against the U.S. In summer of that same year, the campaign was expanded to target Muslim-majority countries. The plan was discouraged by top U.S. diplomats in the region, and after revelations of the campaign came to light, health officials in the U.S. and internationally called the plan "indefensible" and said it "crossed a line."

== Awards and decorations ==
U.S. military decorations
Army Distinguished Service Medal
Defense Superior Service Medal with bronze "C" device and two bronze oak leaf clusters
Legion of Merit with oak leaf cluster
Bronze Star Medal with three oak leaf clusters
Defense Meritorious Service Medal with two oak leaf clusters
Meritorious Service Medal with oak leaf cluster
Joint Service Commendation Medal with oak leaf cluster
Army Commendation Medal with oak leaf cluster
Joint Service Achievement Medal with oak leaf cluster
Army Achievement Medal with oak leaf cluster
U.S. Unit Awards
Army Presidential Unit Citation
Joint Meritorious Unit Award
Meritorious Unit Commendation
U.S. Service (Campaign) Medals and Service and Training Ribbons
National Defense Service Medal with one bronze service star
Afghanistan Campaign Medal with service star
Iraq Campaign Medal with four service stars
Inherent Resolve Campaign Medal with campaign star
Global War on Terrorism Expeditionary Medal
Global War on Terrorism Service Medal
Korea Defense Service Medal
Humanitarian Service Medal
Army Service Ribbon
Army Overseas Service Ribbon with bronze award numeral 4

Badges
Combat Infantryman Badge
Expert Infantryman Badge
Special Forces Tab
Ranger Tab
Master Parachutist Badge with USASOC background trimming
Military Free Fall Parachutist Badge
Air Assault Badge
United States Army Special Operations Command Combat Service Identification Badge
Mexican Parachutist Badge
Ecuadorian Parachutist Badge
1st Special Forces Command Distinctive Unit Insignia
7 Overseas Service Bars

== Personal life ==
Braga is the son of Reid and Mary Braga.

Braga is married to the former Melanie Rohrbaugh of Apple Valley, Calif. The couple has five children. Braga and Rohrbaugh were married on September 4, 1999, at Fort Bragg.

Military offices
Preceded by Stephen G. Smith	Director of Operations of Combined Joint Task Force – Operation Inherent Resolve; 2017–2018	Succeeded by David S. Doyle
Preceded by Daniel D. Yoo	Commander of the Special Operations Command Pacific; 2018–2020	Succeeded by Joshua M. Rudd
Preceded by Charles A. Flynn	Deputy Commanding General (South) of the United States Army Pacific; 2020–2021	Succeeded by Matthew W. McFarlane
Preceded by Francis M. Beaudette	Commanding General of the United States Army Special Operations Command; 2021–2025	Succeeded by Kirk W. Brinker; Acting
Preceded by Frank M. Bradley	Commander of Joint Special Operations Command; 2025–present	Incumbent
