= Admiral Howard =

Admiral Howard may refer to:

- Charles Howard, 1st Earl of Nottingham (1536–1624), English Lord High Admiral
- Edward Howard (admiral) (1476/1477–1513), English Lord High Admiral
- Hugh W. Howard (fl. 1990s–2020s), U.S. Navy rear admiral
- John Howard, 1st Duke of Norfolk (c. 1425–1485), English Lord Admiral
- Michelle Howard (born 1960), U.S. Navy admiral
- Thomas Howard, 1st Earl of Suffolk (1561–1626), English Lord Admiral
- Thomas Howard, 3rd Duke of Norfolk (1473–1554), English Lord Admiral
- Thomas B. Howard (1854–1920), U.S. Navy admiral
- William Howard, 1st Baron Howard of Effingham (c. 1510–1573), English Lord Admiral
