= Charles T. Cleveland =

United States Army general

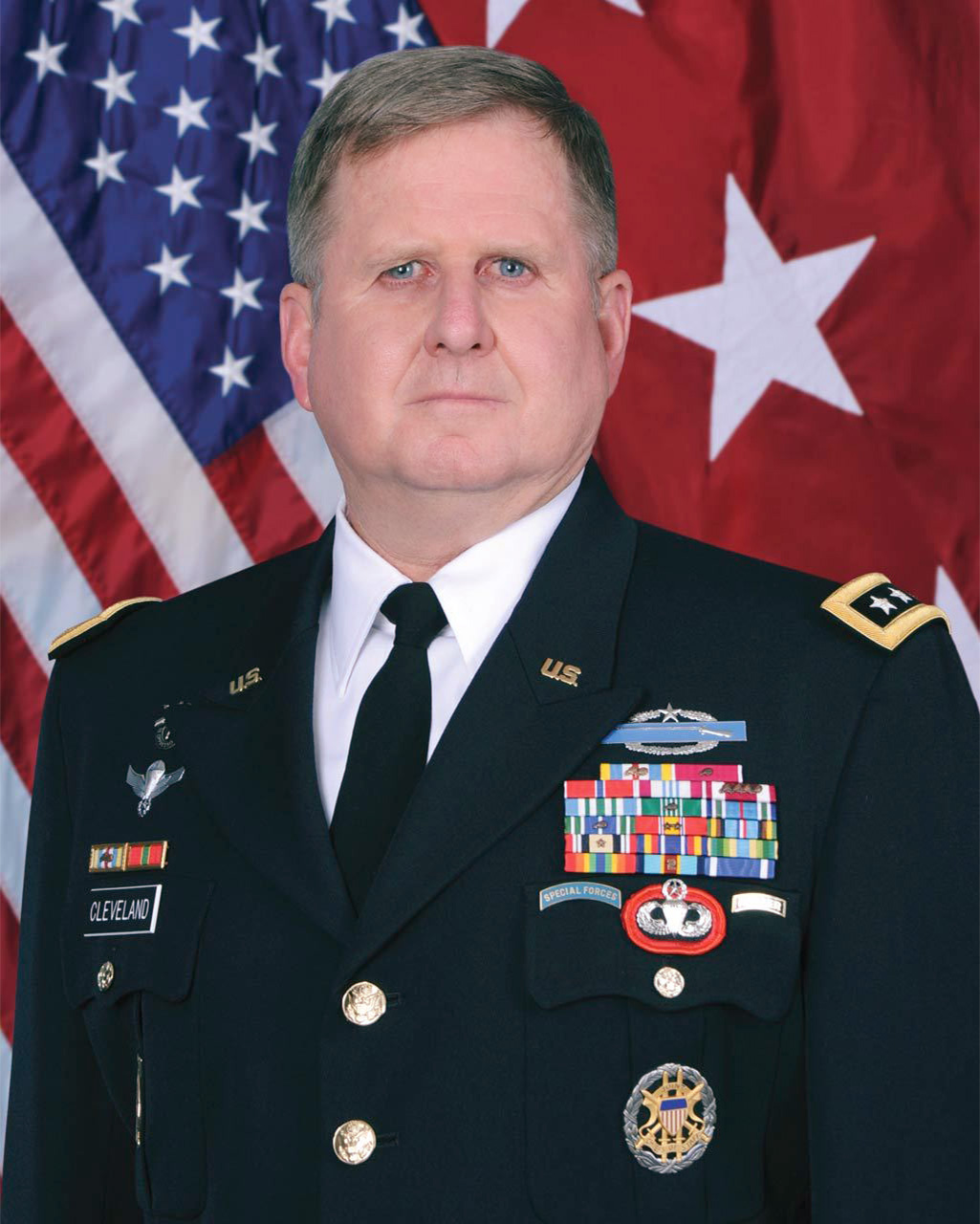
- Born: March 10, 1956 (age 70); California, United States
- Military career
- Allegiance: United States
- Branch: United States Army
- Service years: 1978–2015
- Rank: Lieutenant General
- Commands: United States Army Special Operations Command; Special Operations Command Central; Special Operations Command South; 10th Special Forces Group
- Conflicts: Iraq War; Operation Just Cause; Operation Joint Endeavor
- Awards: Army Distinguished Service Medal; Defense Superior Service Medal (3); Legion of Merit (2); Bronze Star Medal

Charles Thomas Cleveland (born March 10, 1956) is a retired United States Army lieutenant general who was the commander of the United States Army Special Operations Command (2012–2015). He is a graduate of the United States Military Academy, class of 1978. Cleveland previously served as commanding officer of the 10th Special Forces Group from 2001 to 2003, leading the initial invasion into northern Iraq during Operation Iraqi Freedom. He also served as Chief of Staff, and as Deputy Commander of the Army Special Operations Command followed by duty commander of Special Operations Command South from 2005 to 2008. Cleveland served as commander of Special Operations Command Central from 2008 to 2011. He retired from the army in August 2015.

== Awards and decorations ==
Combat Infantryman Badge with Star (denoting 2nd award)
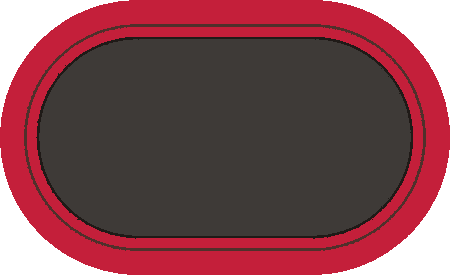
Master Parachutist Badge
Special Forces Tab
Ranger tab
Joint Chiefs of Staff Identification Badge
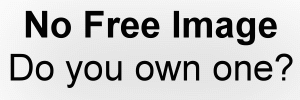
Chilean Master Parachutist Badge
1st Special Forces Command (Airborne) Combat Service Identification Badge
1st Special Forces Command (Airborne) Distinctive Unit Insignia
7 Overseas Service Bars

Army Distinguished Service Medal
Defense Superior Service Medal with two bronze oak leaf clusters
Legion of Merit with oak leaf cluster
Bronze Star Medal
Defense Meritorious Service Medal
Meritorious Service Medal with four oak leaf clusters
Joint Service Commendation Medal
Army Commendation Medal with oak leaf cluster
Joint Service Achievement Medal
Army Achievement Medal with oak leaf cluster
Joint Meritorious Unit Award with two oak leaf clusters
Superior Unit Award
National Defense Service Medal with one bronze service star
Armed Forces Expeditionary Medal
Iraq Campaign Medal with service star
Global War on Terrorism Service Medal
Armed Forces Service Medal
Army Service Ribbon
Army Overseas Service Ribbon with bronze award numeral 2
NATO Medal for the former Yugoslavia with service star
