= Frank M. Bradley =

U.S. Navy admiral

Frank Bradley
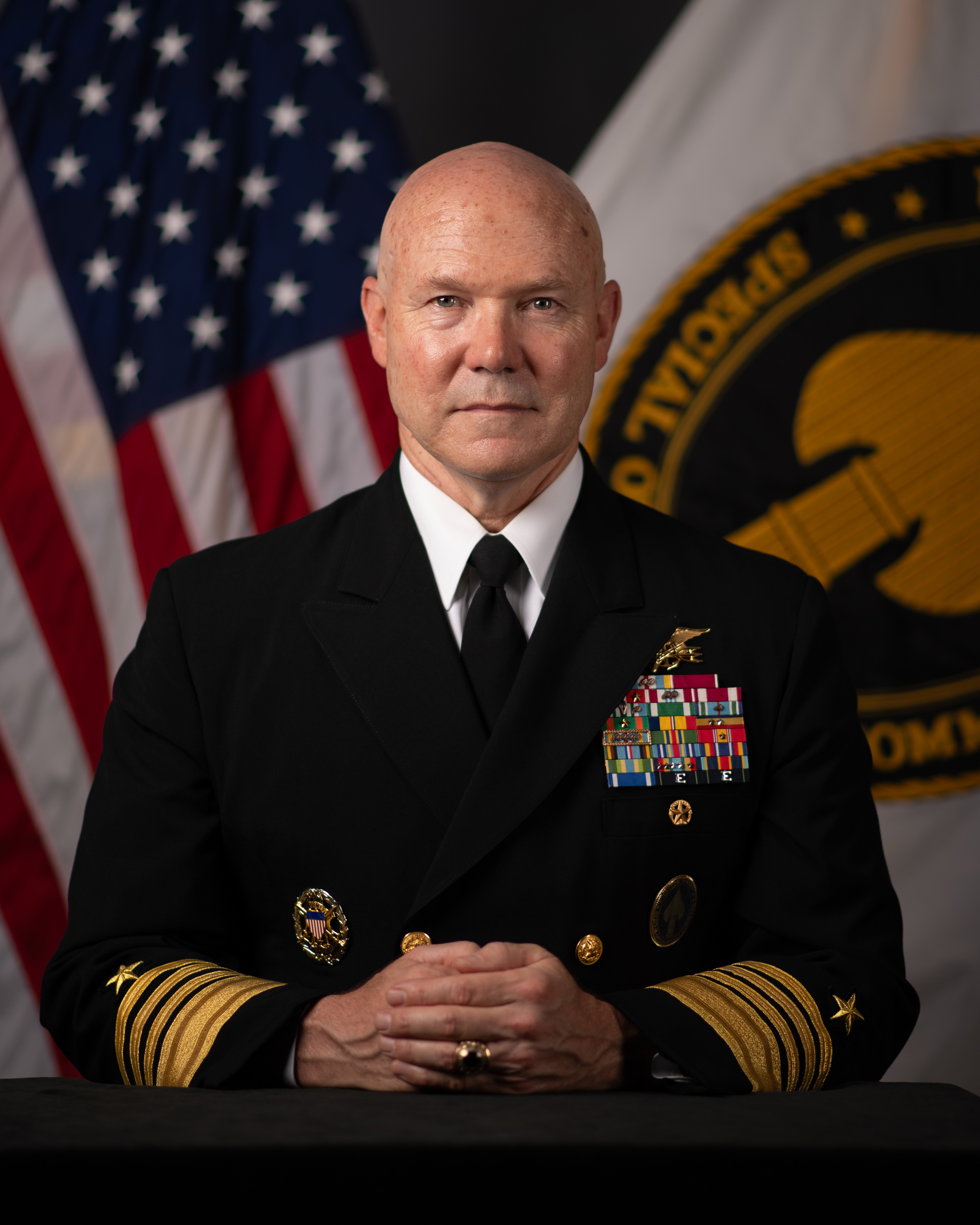
- Official portrait, 2025
- Born: Frank Mitchell Bradley; Eldorado, Texas, U.S.
- Education: United States Naval Academy (BS); Naval Postgraduate School (MS)
- Children: 4
- Military career
- Allegiance: United States
- Branch: United States Navy
- Service years: 1991–present
- Rank: Admiral
- Units: SEAL Delivery Vehicle Team 2; SEAL Team Four; SEAL Team Six
- Commands: U.S. Special Operations Command; Joint Special Operations Command; Special Operations Command Central; SEAL Team Six
- Conflicts: War in Afghanistan; Operation Southern Spear
- Awards: Defense Superior Service Medal (2); Legion of Merit; Bronze Star Medal (2)

Frank Mitchell Bradley is a United States Navy admiral who has commanded the United States Special Operations Command since October 3, 2025.

Bradley was the commander of Joint Special Operations Command (JSOC) from August 10, 2022 to September 26, 2025. On orders from Defense Secretary Pete Hegseth and under Bradley's command, on September 2, 2025, SEAL Team 6, an element of JSOC, carried out controversial strikes on boats in the Caribbean alleged to be involved with narcotics trafficking.

Prior to commanding JSOC, Bradley was the assistant commander of Joint Special Operations Command from 2018 to 2020, and the commander of Special Operations Command Central from July 20, 2020 to July 1, 2022.,

== Early life and education ==
Bradley was born and raised in Eldorado, Texas. He graduated from Eldorado High School in 1987 and was then accepted to the United States Naval Academy in Annapolis, Maryland, where he studied physics and was a varsity gymnast. In 1991 he graduated from the academy and earned his commission.

Bradley earned a Master of Science degree in physics from the Naval Postgraduate School in Monterey, California in December 2005, and in 2006 received a provisional patent for his research. His master's thesis was entitled Transport imaging for the study of quantum scattering phenomena in next generation semiconductor devices. Bradley also received the Monterey Council Navy League Award for Highest Academic Achievement and the Naval Sea Systems Command Award for Excellence in Combat Systems for his thesis research.

== Military career ==
After graduating from the United States Naval Academy in 1991, Bradley immediately applied for SEAL selection; he graduated from Basic Under Water Demolitions/SEAL training (BUD/S) with class 179 in 1992. His operational assignments from 1992 to 1999 include assistant platoon commander and platoon commander tours at SEAL Team Four and SEAL Delivery Vehicle Team Two. He also served as an international exchange officer with the Italian COMSUBIN or Italian SEALs.

In 1999, Bradley volunteered for assignment to the Naval Special Warfare Development Group (commonly known as DEVGRU or SEAL Team Six) and completed a specialized selection and training course known as Green Team. There he operated, rehearsed, and planned clandestine operations. At DEVGRU, he also held numerous leadership positions from 1999 until 2015, which included element leader, troop commander, squadron operations officer, operations officer, squadron commander, deputy commanding officer, and finally, commanding officer from 2013 to 2015. Bradley was among the first American and coalition troops to deploy to Afghanistan following the attacks on 11 September 2001, and he deployed repeatedly since then in support of the war on terror.

Bradley's staff duty from 2016 to 2018 included service as JSOC’s J-3 Technical Operations division chief and deputy J-3; vice deputy director for global operations for the Joint Staff J-3; and executive officer for the chairman of the Joint Chiefs of Staff, General Joseph F. Dunford, Jr. and the deputy director for CT Strategy for the Joint Staff J-5. He also served as assistant commander of JSOC from 2018 to 2020 before taking the post as commander of Special Operations Command Central from 2020 to 2022.

In May 2022, Bradley was nominated for promotion to vice admiral and assigned as commander, Joint Special Operations Command (JSOC) In August 2022, he was promoted and took command of JSOC. In June 2025, Bradley was nominated for promotion to admiral and assignment as commander of the United States Special Operations Command; he assumed that position on October 3, 2025.

=== September 2025 boat-strike incident ===
While commander of the Joint Special Operations Command, Bradley oversaw a strike in the Caribbean on September 2, 2025, ordered by Secretary of Defense Pete Hegseth against a vessel suspected of narcotics trafficking. The Washington Post reported that Bradley ordered a second strike after two survivors were identified on a drone feed, following Hegseth's directive to leave no survivors. The incident prompted questions from current and former officials and law-of-war experts about whether the operation was a war crime or even complied with U.S. Rules of engagement and International law.

According to an account in The Hill, Bradley “viewed the survivors as legitimate targets as they could possibly call other traffickers to come get them and their cargo.” Bradley later contradicted this account by testifying to congressional committees that it seemed that the survivors did not have communication devices.

According to a statement issued by the Former JAGs Working Group (formed in February in response to Secretary of Defense Hegseth's firing of Army and Air Force JAGs), if the alleged order to “kill everybody,” including incapacitated survivors, was part of a “non-international armed conflict” (as the Trump administration claims), then it and its execution would be a war crime; if, on the other hand, the operation was not part of an armed conflict of any kind, then the order and its execution would be murder.

On December 1, 2025, White House Press Secretary Karoline Leavitt asserted that Bradley had ordered the second strike. Secretary of Defense Hegseth stated in a post on X: "Admiral Mitch Bradley is an American hero, a true professional, and has my 100% support. I stand by him and the combat decisions he has made — on the September 2 mission and all others since".

In closed-door briefings on December 4, Bradley told members of the House and Senate Intelligence and Armed Services committees that Hegseth did not give the order to "kill them all". From sources familiar with Bradley's congressional testimony, CNN reported that video footage showed the first missile strike killing nine of eleven occupants of the boat, while breaking the boat apart and capsizing it, leaving two initial survivors holding on to a floating piece of the capsized boat.

According to CNN, Bradley testified that he ordered another missile strike on the floating piece, which had the effect of killing the remaining two occupants, because he believed that the floating piece of the capsized boat had cocaine, and that if the two initial survivors were to be saved with the floating piece, they could still distribute the cocaine. While President Trump claimed that the boat was "heading to the United States", CNN reported that Bradley testified that the boat was going to meet a second watercraft travelling to Suriname and it could be possible that the alleged drugs could have been brought from Suriname to the United States, while also testifying that the second watercraft was not found by the American military and that the first boat had turned back before the first American strike landed.

== Awards and decorations ==
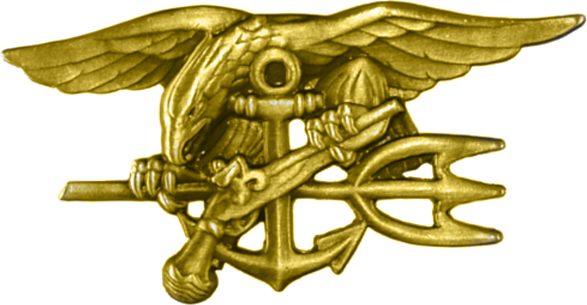
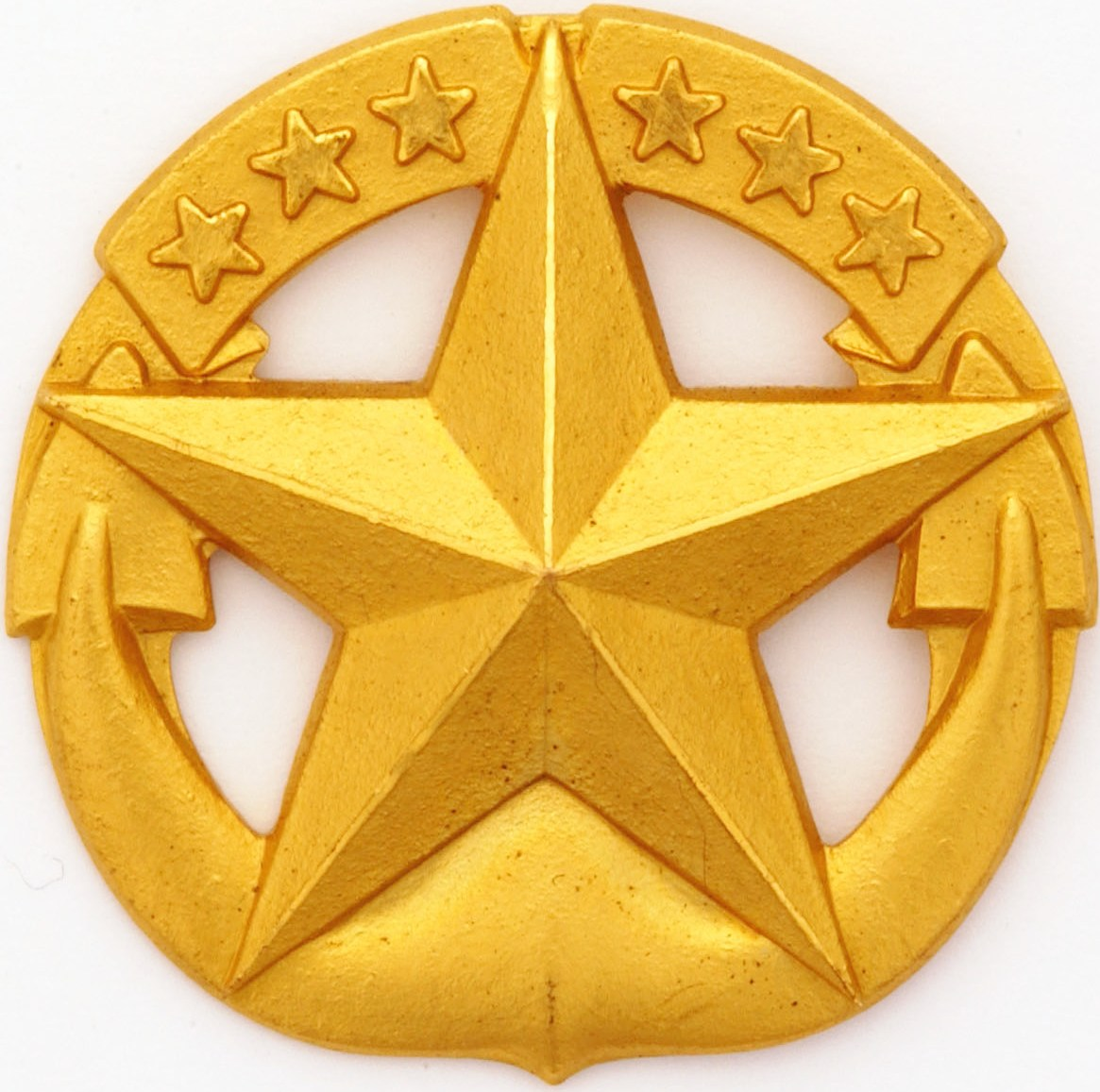

Badge	Special Warfare insignia		
1st row	Defense Superior Service Medal with 1 Oak leaf cluster (2 awards)		Legion of Merit
2nd row	Bronze Star with "V" device and 3 5/16 inch stars (4 awards with valor)	Defense Meritorious Service Medal with 2 Oak leaf clusters (3 awards)	Meritorious Service Medal
3rd row	Joint Service Commendation Medal with 2 Oak leaf clusters (3 awards)	Navy and Marine Corps Commendation Medal	Joint Service Achievement Medal with 1 Oak leaf cluster (2 awards)
4th row	Navy and Marine Corps Achievement Medal with 1 5/16 inch star (2 awards)	Combat Action Ribbon	Navy Presidential Unit Citation with 3 Service stars
5th row	Joint Meritorious Unit Award with 1 Oak leaf cluster	Meritorious Unit Commendation	National Defense Service Medal with 1 Service star
6th row	Armed Forces Expeditionary Medal	Global War on Terrorism Expeditionary Medal	Global War on Terrorism Service Medal
7th row	Armed Forces Service Medal	Sea Service Deployment Ribbon with 1 silver and 3 bronze Campaign stars	Navy and Marine Corps Overseas Service Ribbon
8th row	NATO Medal for Ex-Yugoslavia	Marksmanship Medal for Rifle Expert	Marksmanship Medal for Pistol Expert
Badge	Navy and Marine Corps Parachutist Insignia		
Badge	U.S. Navy Command at Sea insignia		
Badge	Joint Chiefs of Staff Identification Badge		

== Personal life ==
Bradley is the son of Frank M. "Pancho" Bradley, a World War II US Army Air Corps veteran. Bradley and his wife Katherine have a daughter and three sons. Their son Frank graduated from the U.S. Naval Academy in 2020.

Military offices
Preceded by Hugh W. Howard III	Commander of SEAL Team Six; 2013–2015	Succeeded by Jeromy B. Williams
Preceded by Hugh W. Howard III	Assistant commander of the Joint Special Operations Command; 2018–2020	Succeeded by Matthew J. Burns
Preceded by Hugh W. Howard III	Commander of Special Operations Command Central; 2020–2022	Succeeded by Kevin C. Leahy
Preceded by Bryan P. Fenton	Commander of Joint Special Operations Command; 2022–2025	Succeeded by Jonathan P. Braga
Preceded by Bryan P. Fenton	Commander of United States Special Operations Command; 2025–present	Incumbent
