= John F. Mulholland Jr. =

American general

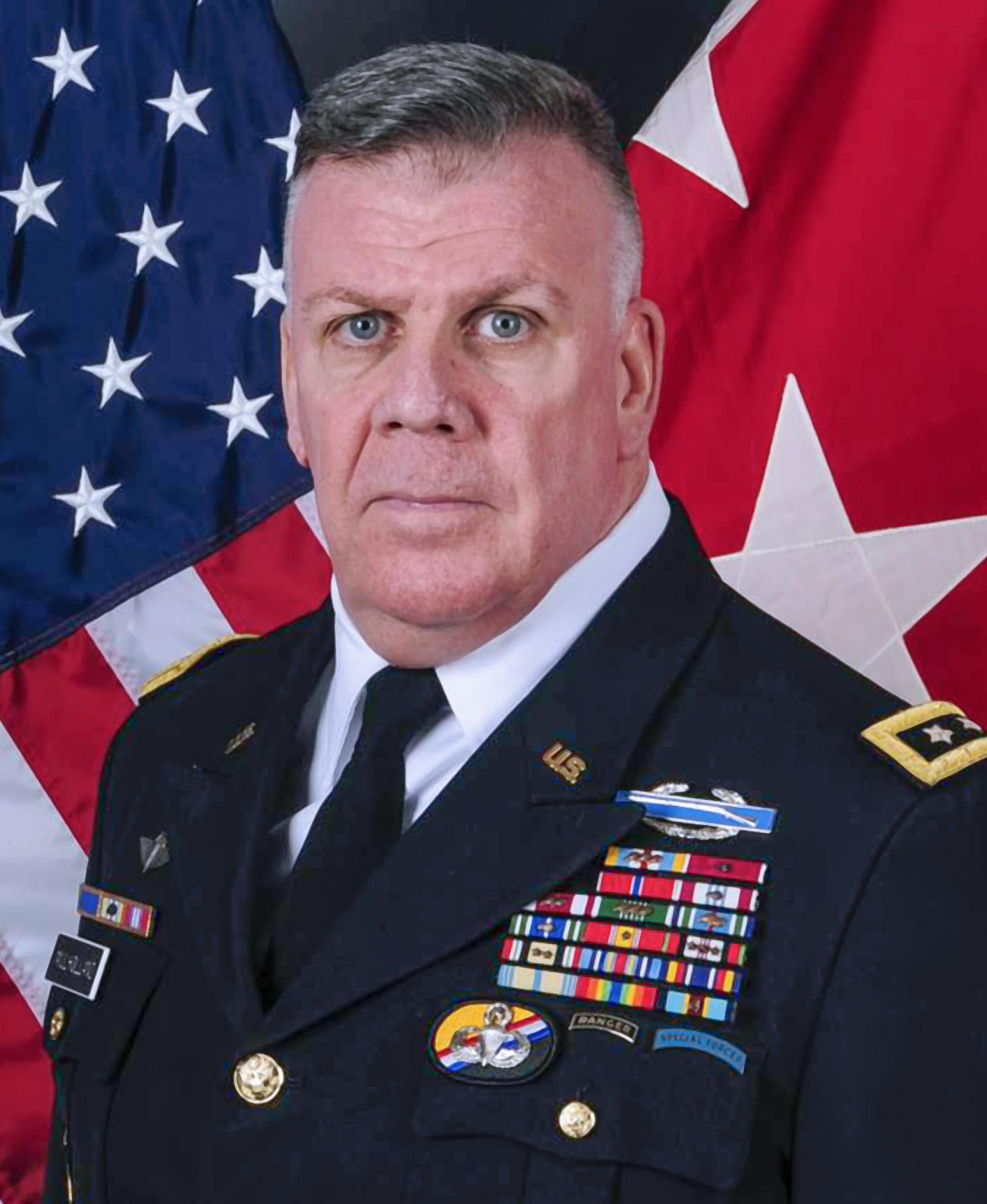
- Born: 1955 (age 70–71); Clovis, New Mexico, U.S.
- Military career
- Allegiance: United States
- Branch: United States Army
- Service years: 1978–2016
- Rank: Lieutenant General
- Commands: Associate Directorate for Military Affairs, Central Intelligence Agency; United States Army Special Operations Command; Special Operations Command Central; 1st Special Forces Command (Airborne); Combined Joint Special Operations Task Force - West; Task Force Dagger; 5th Special Forces Group; 1st Battalion, 1st Special Forces Group (A)
- Conflicts: Iraq War; War in Afghanistan
- Awards: Army Distinguished Service Medal; Defense Superior Service Medal (4); Legion of Merit (2); Bronze Star Medal

Lieutenant General John F. Mulholland Jr. (born 1955) is a retired senior officer who served in the United States Army and is the former Associate Director for Military Affairs (ADMA) at the Central Intelligence Agency. Mulholland previously served as Deputy Commander of the United States Special Operations Command, after having previously served in the US Army's Special Forces. He commanded special operations task forces in both Operation Enduring Freedom and Operation Iraqi Freedom, earning an appointment as Deputy Commanding General of the Joint Special Operations Command and later as Commanding General, United States Army Special Operations Command at Fort Bragg.

== Early life ==
Born in Clovis, New Mexico, Mulholland grew up in Bethesda, Maryland, graduating from Winston Churchill High School where he was a Captain of the football team. He graduated from Furman University in 1978 with a Bachelor of Arts degree in history.

== Military career ==
Mulholland was commissioned as a second lieutenant in the infantry after graduating from Furman University. His first assignment was in Fort Clayton, Panama, from 1979 to 1980, where he served as a rifle platoon leader in Company C, 4th Battalion (Mechanized), 20th Infantry, 193rd Infantry Brigade. From 1980 to 1982, he was rifle platoon leader and weapons platoon leader in Company A (Airborne), 3rd Battalion, 5th Infantry in Fort Kobbe, Panama. In 1983, he completed the Infantry Officer Advanced Course and then graduated from the Special Forces Qualification Course. He then was assigned to the 5th Special Forces Group (A) at Fort Bragg, where he served as Operational Detachment-A commander and a company commander from 1984 to 1986. Mulholland returned to Panama from 1987 to 1989, where he was appointed current operations officer and later exercises and ground operations officer in J-3 (Operations), Special Operations Command South, United States Southern Command.

Mulholland attended the Defense Language Institute and the United States Army Command and General Staff College from January 1990 to June 1991. From June 1991 to 1993, Mulholland served with 1st Battalion, 7th Special Forces Group (A) at Fort Bragg as operations officer and later as an executive officer. Mulholland next received assignment to the 1st Special Forces Operational Detachment - Delta where he served as assistant operations officer, deputy operations officer, and unit operations officer until June 1996.

Mulholland commanded 1st Battalion, 1st Special Forces Group (A), United States Army Pacific Command in Torii Station, Japan, until June 1998. He then assumed a squadron command within the Intelligence Support Activity until August 2000 when he attended the National War College. He assumed command of the 5th Special Forces Group at Fort Campbell, Kentucky, in July 2001, and in October that year became commander of Task Force Dagger, Joint Special Operations Task Force North during Operation Enduring Freedom in Afghanistan. He later served as commander of Combined Joint Special Operations Task Force - West and then Coalition-Joint Task Force-Arabian Peninsula during Operation Iraqi Freedom. In August 2003, he was assigned as chief of the Office of Military Cooperation in Kuwait. From August 2005 through July 2006, Mulholland served as commanding general, 1st Special Forces Command (Airborne). From August 2006 until June 2007, he served as deputy commanding general, Joint Special Operations Command. He assumed command of Special Operations Command Central (SOCCENT) at MacDill AFB, Florida, on June 22, 2007. He served as the commander of United States Army Special Operations Command from November 7, 2008, until July 24, 2012.

On December 12, 2008, in one of the largest awards ceremonies since the Vietnam era, Mulholland and the 3rd Special Forces Group (Airborne) were awarded 19 Silver Star Medals, two Bronze Star Medals for Valor, two Army Commendation Medals for Valor, and four Purple Hearts. In reference to their actions, Mulholland was quoted in saying "If you saw it in a movie, you'd shake your head and say it couldn't happen... But it did".

Mulholland also served as a special assistant to the commanding general at United States Army Forces Command at Fort Bragg from October 2014 to January 2015 before being selected as Associate Director of the Central Intelligence Agency for Military Affairs.

== Personal life ==
Mulholland's family includes his wife, the former Miriam Mitchell of Clemson, South Carolina, and four children.

== Education ==
- 1978 Bachelor of Arts degree, Furman University, Greenville, SC
- 1991 Master of Military Art and Science degree, United States Army Command and General Staff College
- 2001 Master of Science degree in national security and strategic studies, National War College

== Date of Rank ==
Furman University ROTC Cadet – Class of 1978

Rank	Date
Second Lieutenant	Feb 2, 1979
First Lieutenant	Jan 10, 1981
Captain	Jan 1, 1983
Major	Jan 1, 1991
Lieutenant Colonel	May 1, 1995
Colonel	Apr 1, 2001
Brigadier General	Jan 1, 2005
Major General	Jun 16, 2008
Lieutenant General	Nov 7, 2008

== Awards, decorations and badges ==
U.S. military decorations
Army Distinguished Service Medal
Defense Superior Service Medal (with 3 oak leaf clusters)
Legion of Merit (with 1 oak leaf clusters)
Bronze Star Medal
Defense Meritorious Service Medal (with oak leaf clusters)
Meritorious Service Medal (with 2 oak leaf clusters)
Army Commendation Medal (with 3 oak leaf clusters)
Joint Service Achievement Medal (with 2 oak leaf cluster)
Army Achievement Medal (with oak leaf cluster)
U.S. Unit Awards
Presidential Unit Citation
Joint Meritorious Unit Award (with 2 leaf cluster)
Valorous Unit Award (with oak leaf cluster)
U.S. Service (Campaign) Medals and Service and Training Ribbons
National Defense Service Medal (with 1 service star)
Afghanistan Campaign Medal (with 3 service stars)
Iraq Campaign Medal (with 2 service stars)
Global War on Terrorism Expeditionary Medal
Global War on Terrorism Service Medal
Armed Forces Reserve Medal
Army Service Ribbon
Army Overseas Service Ribbon (with award numeral "4")

Other accoutrements
Combat Infantryman Badge
Expert Infantryman Badge
Master Parachutist Badge
Military Freefall Parachutist Badge
Pathfinder Badge
Special Forces Tab
Ranger Tab
US Army Special Forces Combat Service Identification Badge
Army Special Forces Distinctive Unit Insignia
Irish Parachute Badge in Bronze
Unidentified foreign parachutist badge
8 Overseas Service Bars

In recognition of his distinguished service to his country, Mulholland received the Ellis Island Medal of Honor in 2011.
