= Michael K. Nagata =

United States Army general

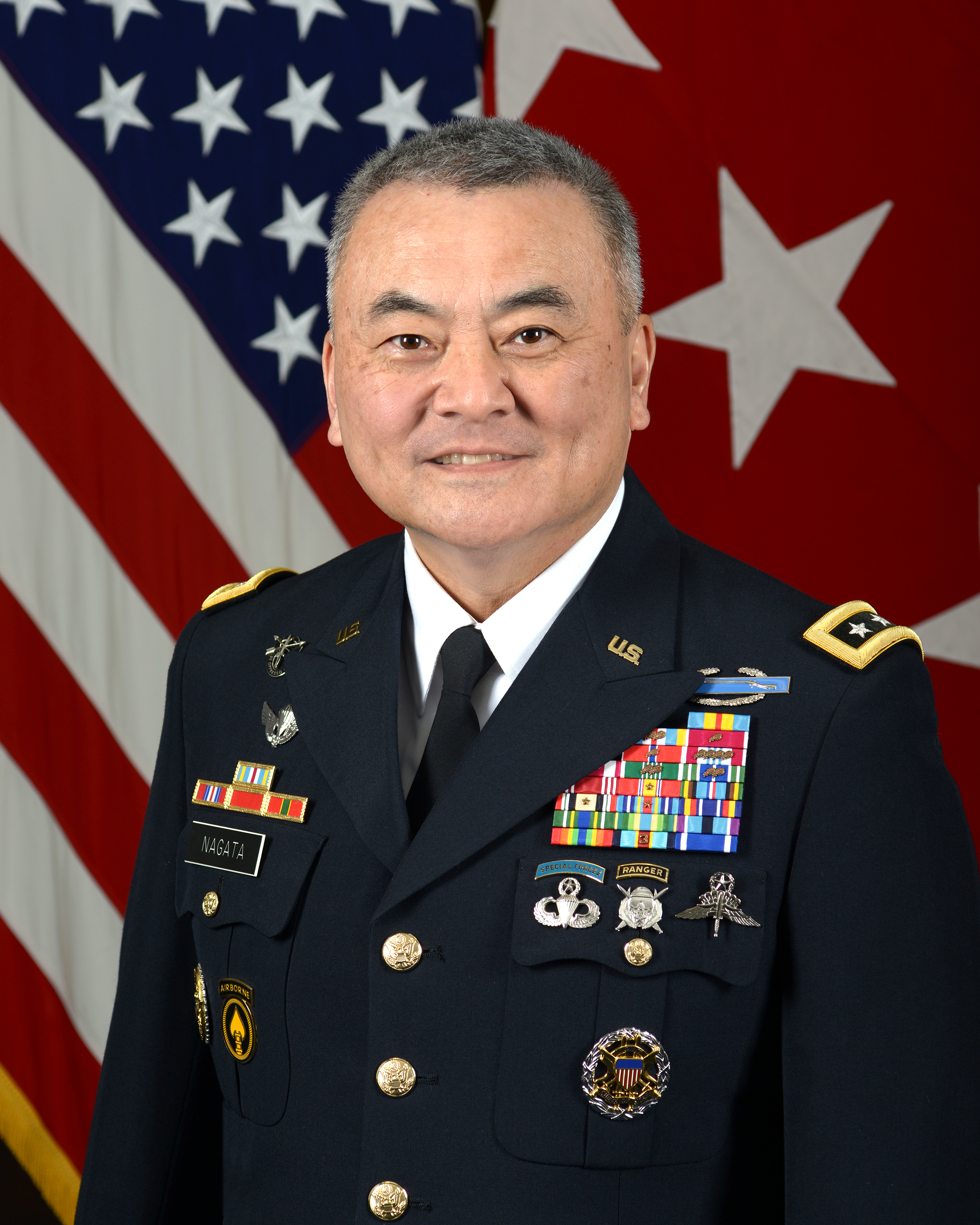
- Born: Alexandria, Virginia
- Spouse: Barbara Nagata
- Children: 5
- Military career
- Allegiance: United States
- Branch: United States Army
- Service years: 1982–2019
- Rank: Lieutenant General
- Commands: Intelligence Support Activity; Special Operations Command Central
- Conflicts: Operation Gothic Serpent; Battle of Mogadishu; Iraq War; War in Afghanistan
- Awards: Defense Distinguished Service Medal; Defense Superior Service Medal (3); Legion of Merit (2); Bronze Star Medal (2)

Michael K. Nagata is a retired United States Army lieutenant general.

== Early career ==
Nagata was commissioned as a second lieutenant in 1982 and served as an infantry platoon leader with the 1st Battalion, 9th Infantry Regiment, 2d Infantry Division in South Korea. He graduated from the Special Forces Qualification Course in 1984 and commanded an Operational Detachment Alpha of the 2nd Battalion, 1st Special Forces Group, where he gained a "reputation for coolness under pressure, and for a wry sense of humor."

Nagata volunteered and was selected for the Intelligence Support Activity in 1990, nicknamed "The Activity", an ultra-secret unit conducting signal and human intelligence gathering for special mission units of Joint Special Operations Command. Nagata spent 15 years in the unit, serving as troop commander until 1994, and operations officer from 1997 to 1999. He would later serve as squadron commander from 2000 to 2002 and later unit commander as a colonel from 2005 to 2008.

In 1993, while deployed on his first tour with The Activity in Somalia, Nagata was "the CIA chief of station’s right-hand man" according to Jerry Boykin (former commander of Delta Force) in Somalia, "functioning as the liaison between the chief of station in Mogadishu and Task Force Ranger, the Joint Special Operations Command (JSOC) task force given the mission to hunt down the warlord Mohamed Farrah Aidid."

== Special Operations Command ==
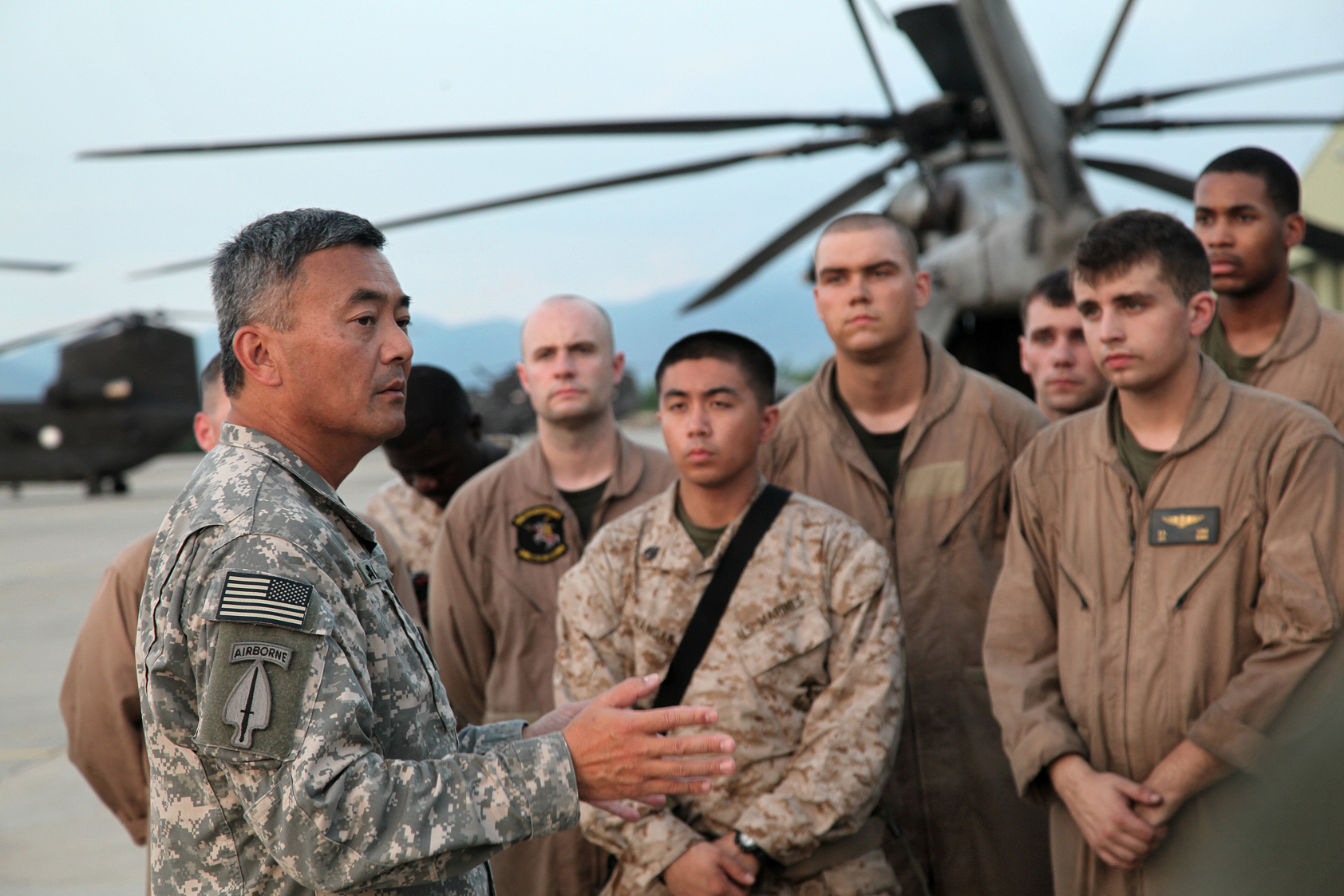
Brigadier General Michael Nagata in Pakistan, 2010

From June 2013 to October 2015 Nagata commanded the Special Operations Command Central. Nagata was in charge of an Obama administration program to "train and equip Syrian rebels," but the program was deemed a "failure," and Nagata stepped down as commander of American Special Operations forces in the Middle East. The program "ultimately produced only a few dozen fighters," rather than the 15,000 originally hoped for.

Nagata's last position on active duty was the Director of Strategy for the National Counterterrorism Center (NCTC) from 2016 to 2019.

== Post-army career ==
On January 6, 2020, CACI International Inc. announced that it had "named Lt. Gen. Michael Nagata, U.S. Army (Ret.), as Corporate Strategic Advisor and Senior Vice President to enhance the positioning of CACI’s national security-related expertise and technology offerings."

== Awards and decorations ==
Combat Infantryman Badge
Special Forces Tab
Ranger tab
Master Parachutist Badge
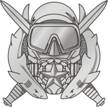
Special Operations Diving Supervisor Badge
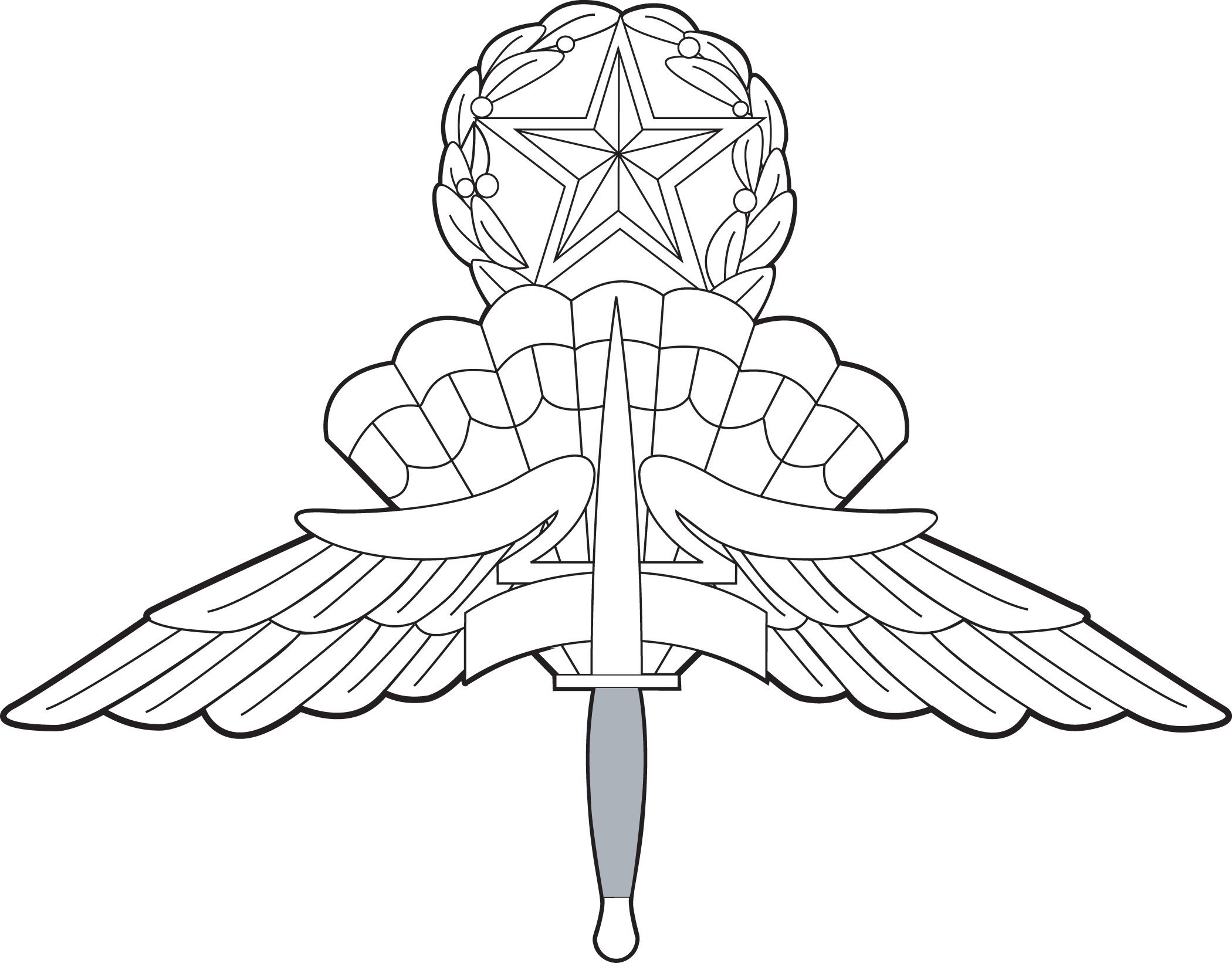
Military Freefall Jumpmaster Badge
Joint Chiefs of Staff Identification Badge
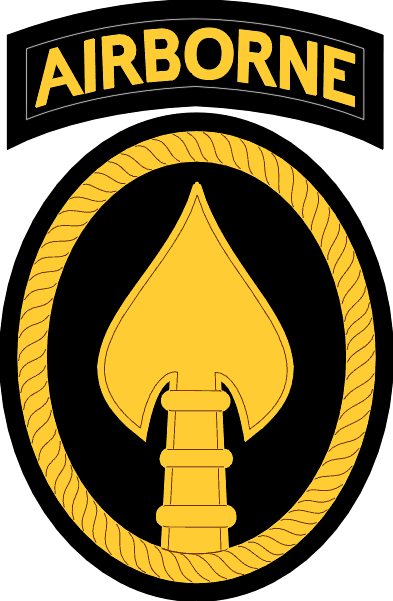
United States Special Operations Command Combat Service Identification Badge
Office of the Secretary of Defense Identification Badge
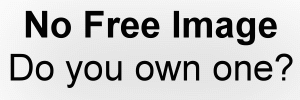
Korean parachutist badge
1st Special Forces Regiment Distinctive Unit Insignia
8 Overseas Service Bars

Defense Distinguished Service Medal
Defense Superior Service Medal with two bronze oak leaf clusters
Legion of Merit with oak leaf cluster
Bronze Star Medal with oak leaf cluster
Defense Meritorious Service Medal with four oak leaf clusters
Meritorious Service Medal with two oak leaf clusters
Army Commendation Medal with two oak leaf clusters
Army Achievement Medal with two oak leaf clusters
Joint Meritorious Unit Award
Valorous Unit Award
Meritorious Unit Commendation
Superior Unit Award
Army Good Conduct Medal
National Defense Service Medal with one bronze service star
Armed Forces Expeditionary Medal
Iraq Campaign Medal with service star
Global War on Terrorism Expeditionary Medal with service star
Global War on Terrorism Service Medal
Korea Defense Service Medal
Armed Forces Service Medal
Humanitarian Service Medal
Army Service Ribbon
Army Overseas Service Ribbon with bronze award numeral 3
NATO Medal for the former Yugoslavia

== Personal life ==
Nagata and his wife Barbara have five children. He was born in Alexandria, Virginia, to Frances and William Nagata, both from Honolulu, Hawaii. His father is a retired military intelligence colonel and was stationed in Virginia at the time of Michael's birth.
