= Hugh W. Howard =

U.S. Navy admiral

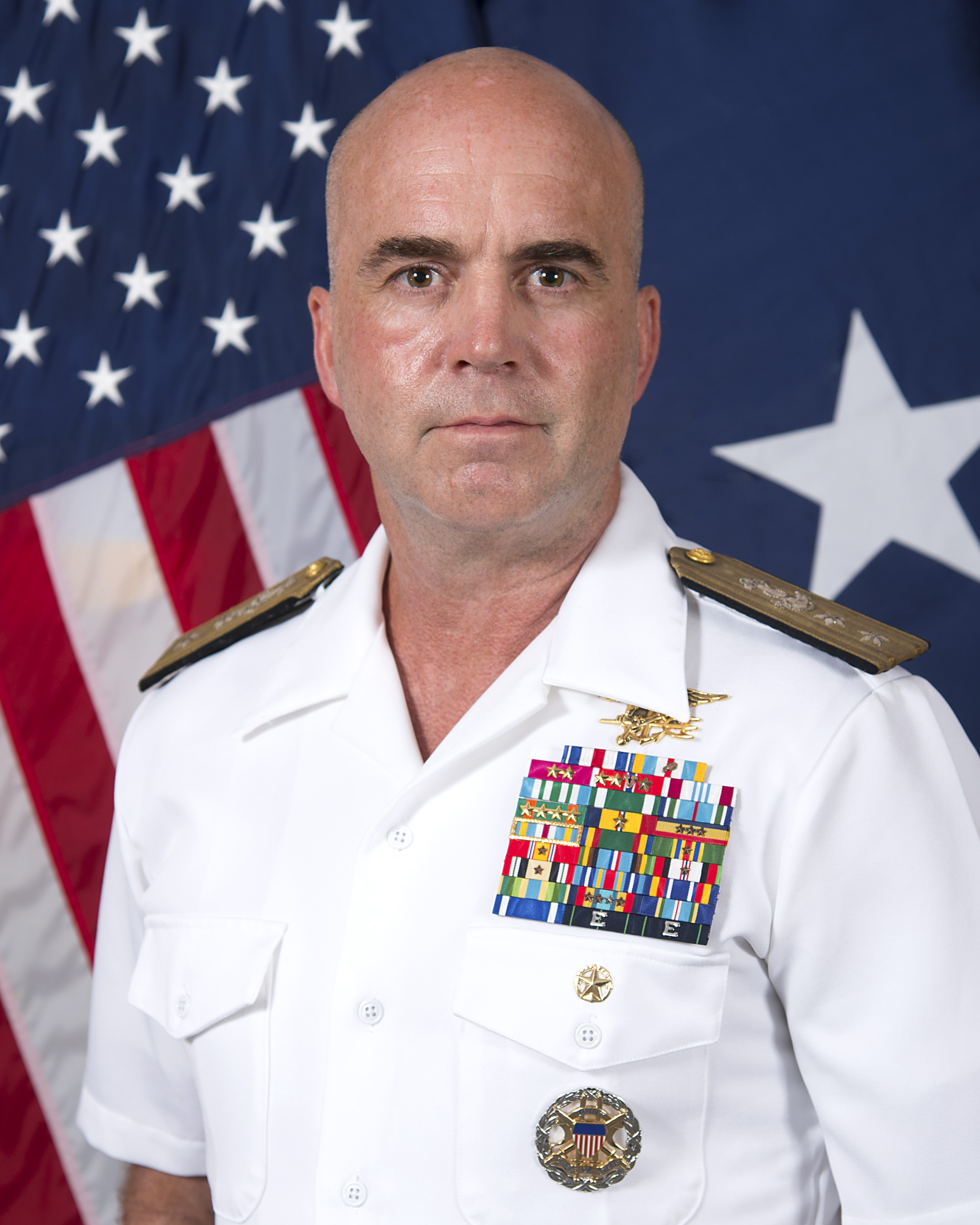
- Official portrait, 2020
- Military career
- Allegiance: United States
- Branch: United States Navy
- Service years: 1990–2022
- Rank: Rear admiral
- Commands: United States Naval Special Warfare Command; Special Operations Command Central; SEAL Team Six
- Conflicts: War in Afghanistan; Iraq War
- Awards: Silver Star; Defense Superior Service Medal (6); Legion of Merit (3); Bronze Star Medal (4)

Hugh W. Howard III is a retired United States Navy rear admiral who commanded the United States Naval Special Warfare Command from September 11, 2020 until August 19, 2022. He was previously the commander of Special Operations Command Central from July 19, 2018, to July 20, 2020.

== Military career ==
Howard graduated from the Naval Academy in 1990 and received a commission as an ensign in the United States Navy. He volunteered for Basic Underwater Demolition/SEAL training at Naval Amphibious Base Coronado and graduated with BUD/S class 172 in February 1991. His first operational assignment was with SEAL Team EIGHT at Naval Amphibious Base Little Creek. Following SEAL Tactical Training (STT) and completion of six month probationary period, he received the 1130 designator as a Naval Special Warfare Officer, entitled to wear the Special Warfare insignia also known as "SEAL Trident". In 1998, Howard volunteered for assignment to Naval Special Warfare Development Group (commonly known as DEVGRU or SEAL Team Six), in Dam Neck, Virginia and completed a specialized selection and training course. He then served with the command as troop commander, squadron operations officer until 2003 during which time he planned, rehearsed and operated during classified exercises and operations. Howard served with JSOC as operations officer in 2005. Howard later returned to DEVGRU in 2006 as squadron commander of Red Squadron till 2009. At DEVGRU he also held numerous leadership positions including squadron operations officer, deputy commanding officer and commanding officer of Naval Special Warfare Development Group from 2011 to 2013. Howard earned a Master of Arts degree at the Naval War College in 2010. He recently commanded Special Operations Command Central, MacDill Air Force Base, Florida, from 2018 to 2020 following assignment as assistant commander, Joint Special Operations Command, Fort Bragg, North Carolina from 2016 to 2018. Howard's awards include the Silver Star, four Bronze Stars with Combat Distinguishing Device, six Defense Superior Service Medals, three Legions of Merit, the Navy Combat Actions Ribbon, five Presidential Unit Citations, and four Joint Meritorious Unit Awards.

== Awards and decorations ==
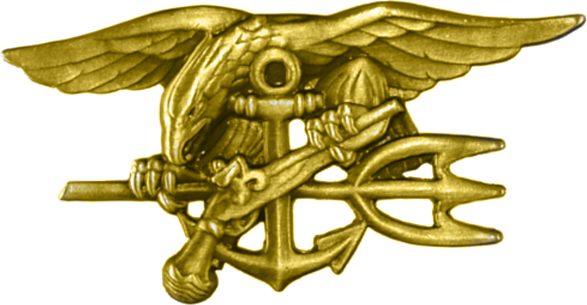

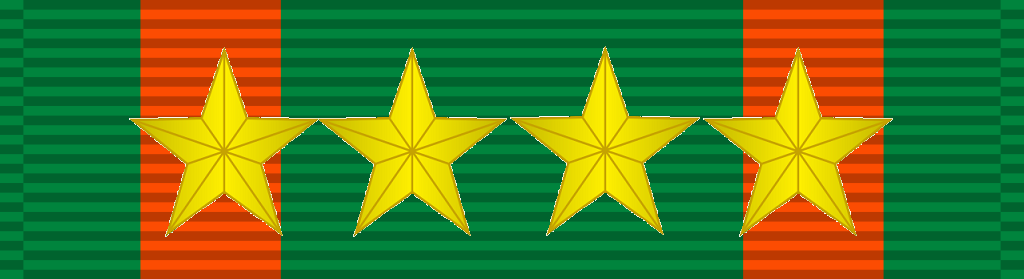

Badge	SEAL Insignia		
1st Row	Silver Star		Defense Superior Service Medal w/ 1 silver oak leaf cluster
2nd Row	Legion of Merit w/ 2 awards stars	Bronze Star Medal w/ 3 award stars and combat V	Defense Meritorious Service Medal w/ oak leaf cluster
3rd Row	Joint Service Commendation Medal	Navy and Marine Corps Commendation Medal	Joint Service Achievement Medal
4th Row	Navy and Marine Corps Achievement Medal w/ 4 award stars	Combat Action Ribbon w/ 1 award star	Navy Presidential Unit Citation w/ 4 bronze service stars
5th Row	Joint Meritorious Unit Award w/ 3 bronze oak leaf clusters	Navy Unit Commendation	Navy Meritorious Unit Commendation w/ 1 bronze service star
6th Row	National Defense Service Medal w/ 1 service star	Armed Forces Expeditionary Medal	Afghanistan Campaign Medal w/ 1 bronze service star
7th Row	Iraq Campaign Medal w/ 1 bronze service star	Global War on Terrorism Expeditionary Medal	Global War on Terrorism Service Medal
8th Row	Armed Forces Service Medal	Sea Service Deployment Ribbon w/ 4 service stars	Coast Guard Special Operations Service ribbon
9th row	NATO Medal for the former Yugoslavia	Rifle Marksmanship Medal	Pistol Marksmanship Medal
Badge	Naval Parachutist insignia		
Badge	Command-at-Sea Insignia		
Badge	Joint Chiefs of Staff Identification Badge		

Military offices
Preceded by Perry F. Van Hooser	Commander of SEAL Team Six; 2009–2013	Succeeded by Frank M. Bradley
Preceded by Darsie D. Rogers Jr.	Commander of Special Operations Command Central; 2018–2020	Succeeded by Frank M. Bradley
Preceded by Collin P. Green	Commander of the United States Naval Special Warfare Command; 2020–2022	Succeeded by Keith B. Davids
