= James E. Kraft =

U.S. Army general

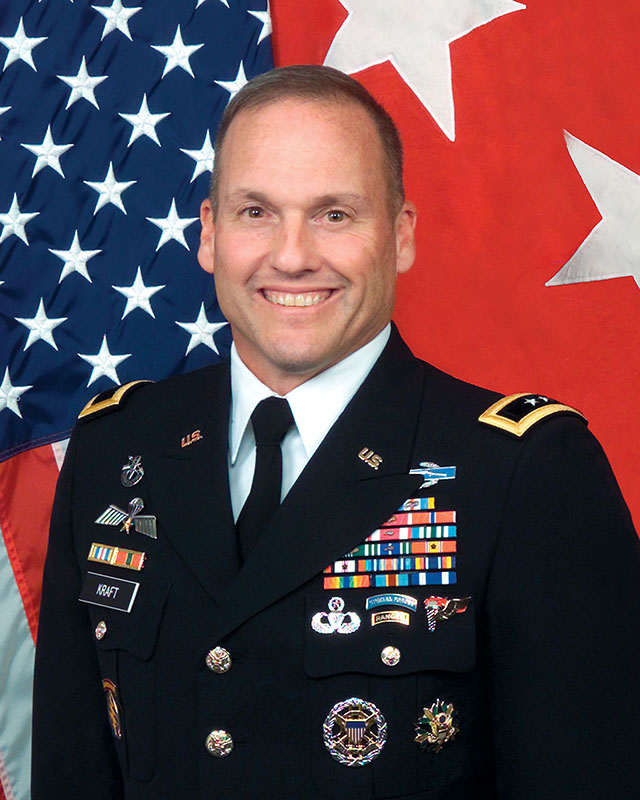
- Born: Baltimore, Maryland, U.S.
- Military career
- Allegiance: United States
- Branch: United States Army
- Service years: 1986–2021
- Rank: Major General
- Commands: Special Operations Joint Task Force-Operation Inherent Resolve; 1st Special Forces Command (Airborne)
- Conflicts: War in Afghanistan
- Awards: Defense Superior Service Medal (3); Legion of Merit (3); Bronze Star Medal

James E. Kraft Jr. is a retired United States Army major general who was the Deputy Commanding General of the XVIII Airborne Corps. Previously, he was the Director of Operations of the United Nations Command, ROK/US Combined Forces Command and United States Forces Korea.

In September 2023, Arcanum, a global strategic intelligence company and a wholly owned subsidiary of Magellan Investment Holdings, appointed Maj. Gen. (ret) James E. Kraft Jr. as Senior Vice President, Special Operations and Mission Support. He provides leadership and expertise on Special Operations and Mission Support for Arcanum.

Military offices
Preceded by Darsie D. Rogers Jr.	Commanding General of 1st Special Forces Command (Airborne); 2015–2017	Succeeded by Francis M. Beaudette
Preceded by ???	Commander of Special Operations Joint Task Force-Operation Inherent Resolve; 2017	Succeeded by James Jarrard
