= Lawrence G. Ferguson =

American military officer

Lawrence G. "Gil" Ferguson (born c. 1968) is a lieutenant general in the United States Army serving as the commanding general of the United States Army Special Operations Command (USASOC) since November 24, 2025.

== Early life and education ==
Ferguson was born and raised in the Clinton and Terry area of Mississippi. He graduated from Clinton High School in 1986. He attended the United States Air Force Academy, graduating in 1990, and was commissioned as a second lieutenant before cross-commissioning into the United States Army as an infantry officer.

He later earned a Master of Arts degree in American history from Mississippi College. Between periods of active military service, Ferguson taught United States history at Jackson Preparatory School in Mississippi from 1994 to 1997.

== Military career ==
Ferguson began his military career with the 101st Airborne Division at Fort Campbell, Kentucky. After leaving active duty, he joined the Mississippi Army National Guard's 20th Special Forces Group, where he completed Special Forces training and earned the Green Beret. He returned to active duty with the 7th Special Forces Group in late 2001.

A career Special Forces officer, Ferguson has commanded at every level from Operational Detachment Alpha through senior command assignments. His operational experience includes deployments in support of Operation Enduring Freedom, Operation Iraqi Freedom, and Operation Inherent Resolve, as well as assignments throughout Latin America and the Middle East. He has also served in a classified Army special missions unit.

His senior assignments have included commander of the 10th Special Forces Group (Airborne), chief of staff of the 1st Special Forces Command (Airborne), deputy commanding general for operations of the 82nd Airborne Division, director of operations for Combined Joint Task Force – Operation Inherent Resolve, and chief of staff of the United States Army Special Operations Command.

Ferguson served as commanding general of the 1st Special Forces Command (Airborne) from June 2023 to August 2025 before assuming command of USASOC in November 2025.

He was promoted to brigadier general on September 2, 2021, major general on April 3, 2024, and lieutenant general on November 3, 2025.

== Command of USASOC ==
Ferguson assumed command of the United States Army Special Operations Command on November 24, 2025, during a ceremony held at Fort Bragg, North Carolina. He succeeded Lieutenant General Jonathan P. Braga and was promoted to lieutenant general during the ceremony by Army Chief of Staff General Randy A. George.

== Personal life ==
Ferguson is married to Renee Ferguson (née Hand). They have three sons.

== Awards and decorations ==
Ferguson's awards and decorations include the Bronze Star Medal with "V" device, the Purple Heart, and multiple Meritorious Service Medals. He has also earned foreign military qualifications, including British Special Air Service wings.
