= Kenneth E. Tovo =

United States Army general

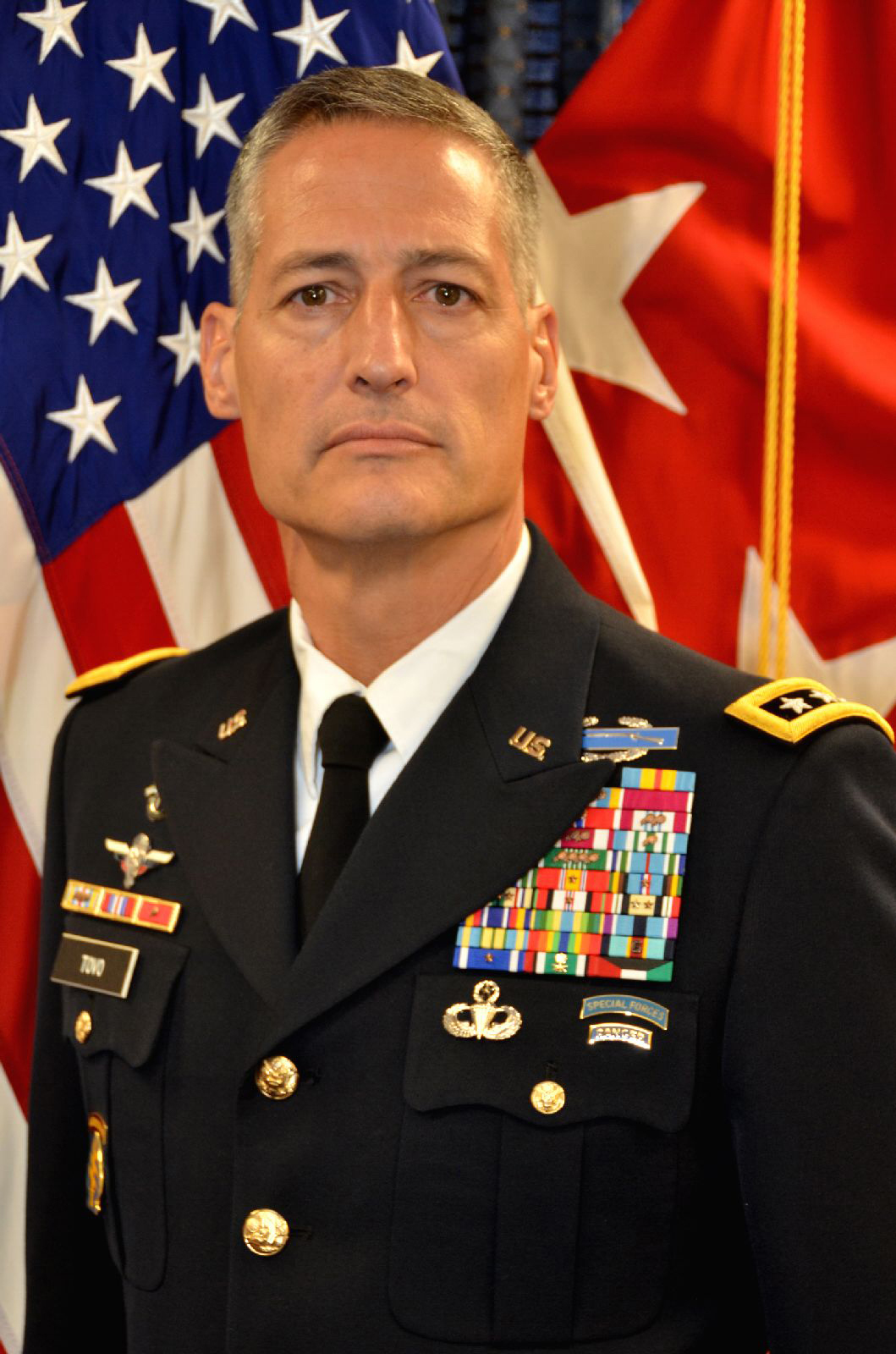
- Born: March 21, 1961 (age 65); New York, United States
- Military career
- Allegiance: United States
- Branch: United States Army
- Service years: 1983–2018
- Rank: Lieutenant General
- Commands: United States Army Special Operations Command; NATO Training Mission-Afghanistan; Combined Security Transition Command – Afghanistan; Special Operations Command Central
- Conflicts: Gulf War; War in Afghanistan; Iraq War
- Awards: Defense Distinguished Service Medal; Defense Superior Service Medal (4); Legion of Merit; Bronze Star Medal (2)

Kenneth Ernest Tovo (born March 21, 1961) is a retired United States Army lieutenant general who served as Commanding General of the United States Army Special Operations Command. He graduated from the United States Military Academy in 1983. He has served as Deputy Commander, United States Southern Command, Commander of Special Operations Command Central, Deputy Commanding General, Special Operations Command Europe, Chief of Staff, United States Army Special Operations Command, and Commanding General, Combined Security Transition Command-Afghanistan and NATO Training Mission-Afghanistan.

== Awards and decorations ==
Combat Infantryman Badge
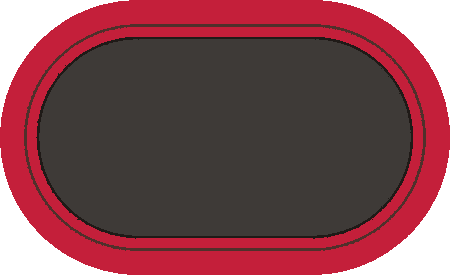
Master Parachutist Badge
Special Forces Tab
Ranger tab
1st Special Forces Command (Airborne) Combat Service Identification Badge
1st Special Forces Command (Airborne) Distinctive Unit Insignia
7 Overseas Service Bars

Defense Distinguished Service Medal
Defense Superior Service Medal with three bronze oak leaf clusters
Legion of Merit
Bronze Star Medal with oak leaf cluster
Defense Meritorious Service Medal with two oak leaf clusters
Meritorious Service Medal with two oak leaf clusters
Joint Service Commendation Medal with oak leaf cluster
Army Commendation Medal with four oak leaf clusters
Joint Service Achievement Medal
Army Achievement Medal with oak leaf cluster
Joint Meritorious Unit Award with three oak leaf clusters
Valorous Unit Award
Meritorious Unit Commendation with oak leaf cluster
National Defense Service Medal with one bronze service star
Armed Forces Expeditionary Medal with service star
Southwest Asia Service Medal with three campaign stars
Afghanistan Campaign Medal with campaign star
Iraq Campaign Medal with silver and bronze campaign stars
Global War on Terrorism Service Medal
Armed Forces Service Medal
Humanitarian Service Medal
Military Outstanding Volunteer Service Medal
Army Service Ribbon
Army Overseas Service Ribbon with bronze award numeral 6
NATO Medal for the former Yugoslavia with service star
Kuwait Liberation Medal (Saudi Arabia)
Kuwait Liberation Medal (Kuwait)

Military offices
Preceded by Joseph D. Kernan	Military Deputy Commander of the United States Southern Command; 2013–2015	Succeeded by Joseph P. DiSalvo
