= Special Operations Command Central =

Sub-unified command of the U.S. Central Command

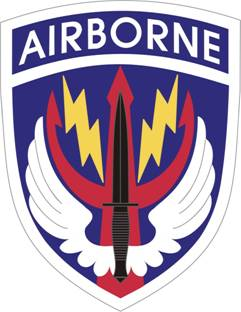
- SOCCENT insignia
- Active: 1985-Present
- Country: United States
- Branch: Joint service
- Type: Special Operations
- Role: Provide fully capable Special Operations Forces to defend the United States and its interests and plan and synchronize operations against terrorist networks
- Part of: USCENTCOM
- Garrison/HQ: MacDill AFB, FL
- Motto: Molon labe
- Engagements: Gulf War; Operation Enduring Freedom; Operation Iraqi Freedom; Operation New Dawn; Operation Inherent Resolve

Commanders
- Commander: Rear Admiral Thomas A. Donovan (USN)
- Notable commanders: Albert M. Calland III; Gary L. Harrell; Kenneth E. Tovo; John F. Mulholland, Jr. Michael K. Nagata; Darsie D. Rogers

Insignia
- Special Operations Command Central DUI

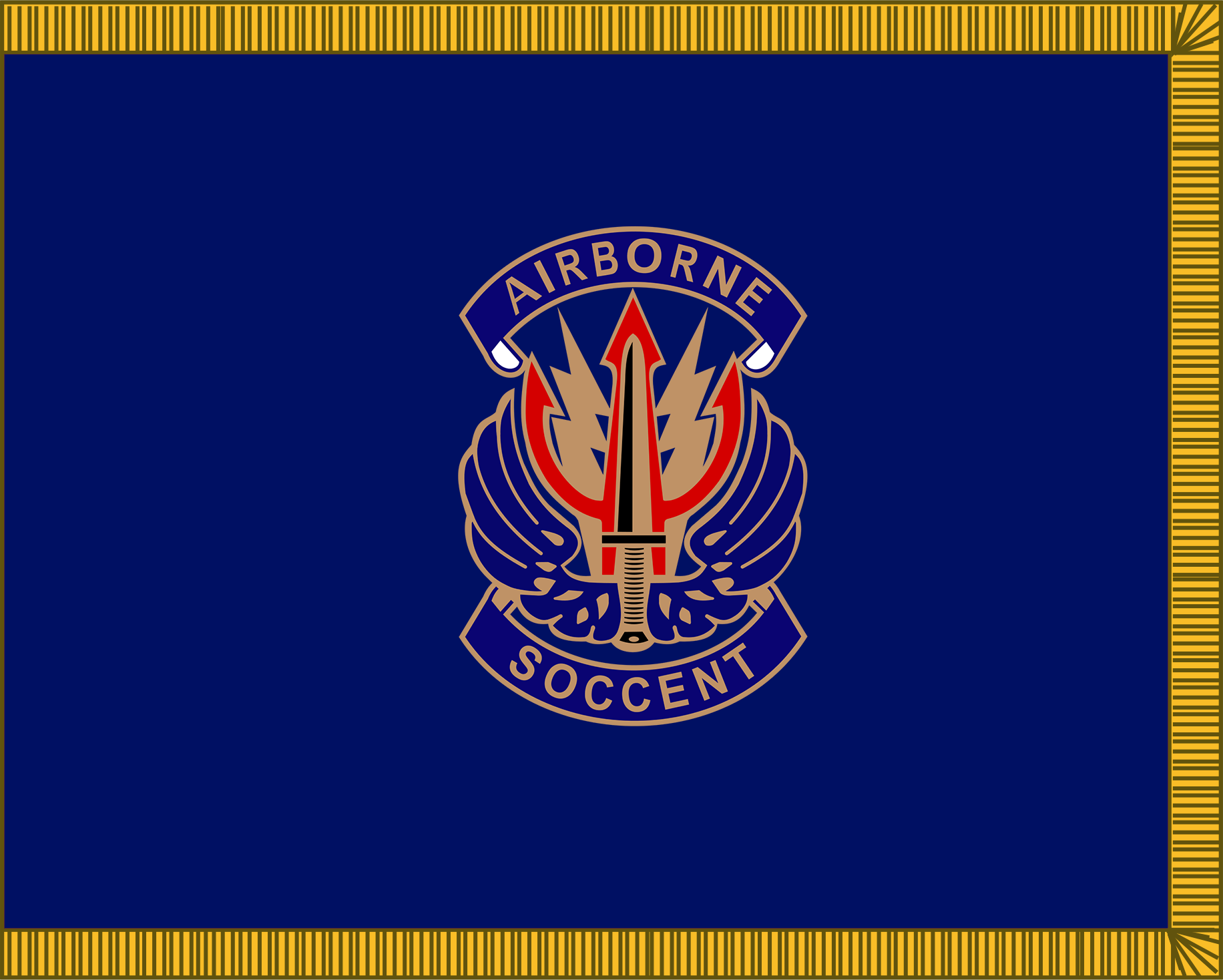
- Special Operations Command Central Flag

The Special Operations Command Central (SOCCENT) is a sub-unified command of the U.S. Central Command (CENTCOM). It is responsible for planning special operations throughout the CENTCOM area of responsibility (AOR), planning and conducting peacetime joint/combined special operations training exercises, and orchestrating command and control of peacetime and wartime special operations as directed.

The command is headquartered at MacDill Air Force Base in Tampa, Florida. SOCCENT FWD (formerly known as Combined Forces Special Operations Component Command) is located at Al Udeid in Qatar.

In the initial stages of Operation Enduring Freedom in Afghanistan, the formation's commander was Rear Admiral Albert Calland. SOCCENT stood up Joint Special Operations Task Forces (JSOTFs). Beginning on 5 October 2001, Joint Special Operations Task Force-North (JSOTFN) was established under command of Col Frank Kisner at Karshi-Kanabad (K2), Uzbekistan, and the bombing of Afghanistan began on 7 October. The 5th Special Forces Group, under the command of COL John Mulholland, deployed to K2 and formed the core of this JSOTF, more commonly known as Task Force Dagger. Unconventional warfare became DAGGER's principal mission. This task force included aviators from the 160th SOAR (A) and Special Tactics personnel from AFSOC.

== History ==
In the lead-up to the 2003 invasion of Iraq, SOCCENT assigned the 5th Special Forces Group the task of establishing Combined Joint Special Operations Task Force-West (CJSOTF-W), and its three battalions would constitute the bulk of the task force. As operations approached, CJSOTF-W grew to include Australian and British special forces, Psychological Operations (PSYOP) elements from B Company, 9th PSYOP Battalion, and 301st PSYOP Company, with Civil Affairs augmentation.

Most U.S. special operations forces left Iraq in May and June 2003. CJSOTF-N/Task Force Viking was deactivated, and CJSOTF-W was re-designated CJSOTF-Arabian Peninsula (CJSOTFAP), having moved to Baghdad in April. By July 2003, CJSOTF-AP had drawn down to the 5th Special Forces Group Headquarters, consisting of one Naval Special Warfare Task Unit (NSWTU) and one FOB. The FOB commanded 14 ODAs, a few of them at full strength. The bulk of these forces remained in Baghdad with outstations covering Al Qaim, Ramadi/Fallujah, Najaf/Nasiriyah, Hillah, Kut/Amarah, Tikrit, Balad, Samarra, and Kirkuk.

According to a 2006 online edition of Special Operations Technology magazine, SOCCENT, operating with coalition partners as the CFSOCC, consists of two combined joint special operations task forces [CJSOTFs], one Combined Joint Special Operations Aviation Command (also referred to as 'Component'), which seems to be at Balad Air Base, one joint psychological operations task force, one Naval Special Warfare Unit and three Special Operations command and control elements [SOCCEs].

The two CJSOTFs are CJSOTF-Arabian Peninsula, whose headquarters directs United States Army Special Forces and CJSOTF Afghanistan. Combined Joint Special Operations Task Force-Arabian Peninsula (CJSOTF-AP) is a "white," or unclassified, special operations task force that is always organized around the headquarters of the 5th Special Forces Group or 10th Special Forces Group. Combined Joint Special Operations Task Force-Arabian Peninsula (CJSOTF-AP), itself answers to While information is scarce, it consists of two battalions of the United States Army Special Forces (the 'Green Berets') and a west coast-based Navy SEAL Team. CJSOTF-AP is task-organized into three Special Operations Task Forces (SOTFs): SOTF-Central, SOTF-North, and SOTF-West.

CJSOTF Afghanistan's headquarters has been provided in rotation by a number of Army Special Forces Groups, including the 3rd and the 19th.

== Unit decorations ==
The unit awards depicted below are for Headquarters, US Special Operations Command Central at MacDill AFB. Award for unit decorations do not apply to any subordinate organizations, commands, or any other activities unless the orders specifically address them.

Award streamer	Award	Dates	Notes
	Joint Meritorious Unit Award	2 August 1990 – 15 April 1991	
	Joint Meritorious Unit Award	22 April 1991 – 5 April 1994	
	Joint Meritorious Unit Award	6 April 1994 – 16 May 1995	
	Joint Meritorious Unit Award	21 January 1998 – 25 May 1998	
	Joint Meritorious Unit Award	12 December 1998 – 25 May 1999	
	Joint Meritorious Unit Award	16 June 1998 – 1 November 1999	
	Joint Meritorious Unit Award	2 November 1999 – 15 May 2001	
	Joint Meritorious Unit Award	17 September 2001 – 15 May 2003	
	Joint Meritorious Unit Award	16 May 2003 – 31 May 2005	
	Joint Meritorious Unit Award	1 June 2005 – 31 May 2007	
	Joint Meritorious Unit Award	1 June 2007 – 31 October 2009	
	Joint Meritorious Unit Award	1 November 2009 – 31 December 2012	
	Joint Meritorious Unit Award	1 January 2013 – 30 June 2015	
	Joint Meritorious Unit Award	1 July 2015 – 30 June 2017	
