= Combat Service Identification Badge =

U.S. Army heraldic device

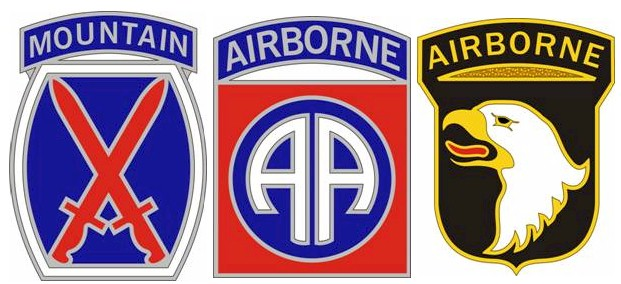
Example of Combat Service Identification Badges for the 10th Mountain Division, 82nd Airborne Division and 101st Airborne Division

The Combat Service Identification Badge (CSIB) is a metallic heraldic device worn on the right side of the United States Army's Army Service Uniform that uniquely identifies a soldier's combat service with major U.S. Army formations.

== Description ==
The Shoulder Sleeve Insignia-Former Wartime Service was also worn on the Army Green "Class A" Uniform, until that uniform was discontinued in 2015.

CSIB are silver or gold-colored metal and enamel devices that are 2 inches (5.08 cm) in height consisting of a design similar to the unit Shoulder Sleeve Insignia (SSI).

== Wear ==
Brig. Gen. William Cole wearing the 82nd Airborne Division CSIB

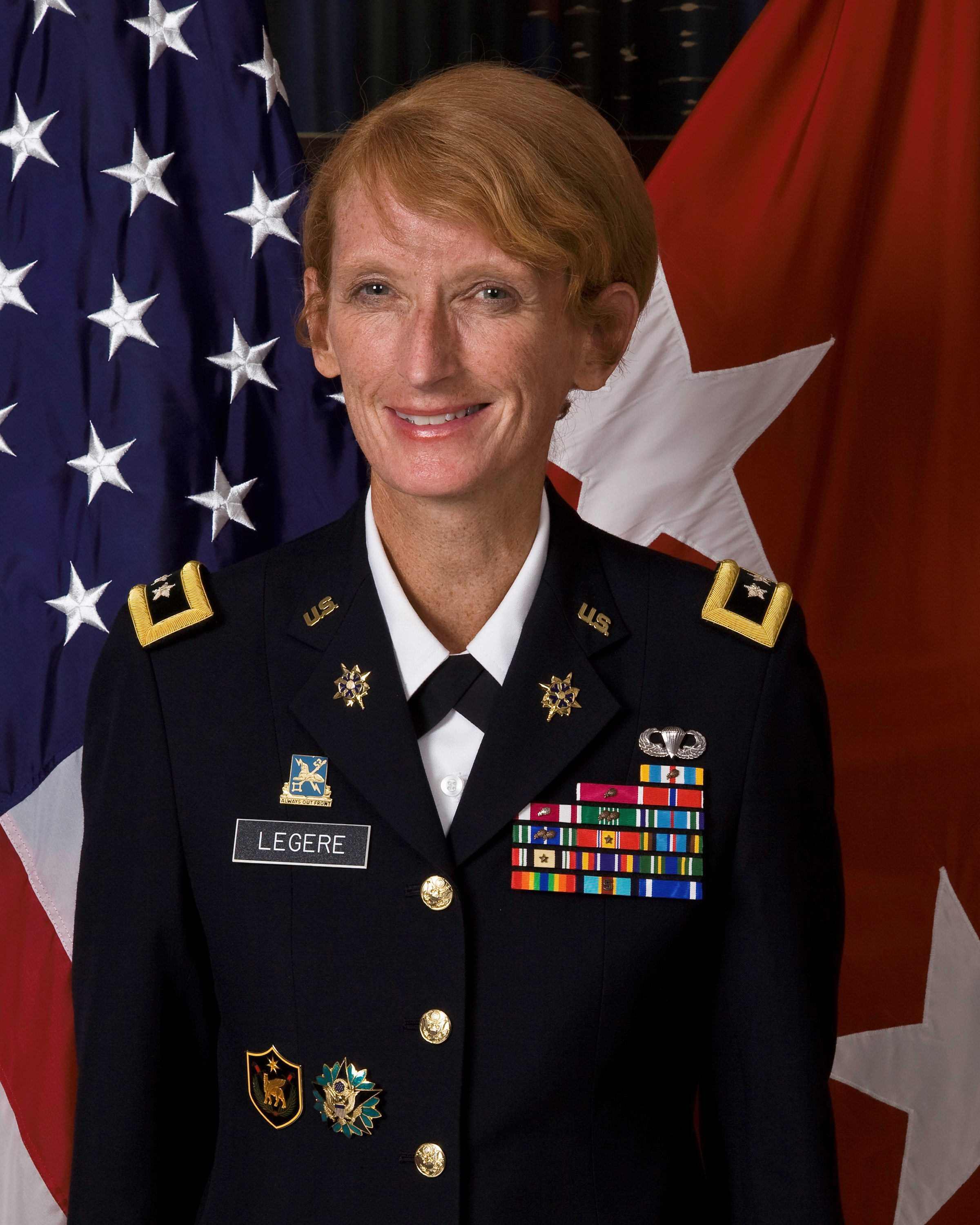
Lt. Gen. Mary Legere wearing the Multi-National Force – Iraq CSIB and the Army Staff Identification Badge

The Combat Service Identification Badge is worn on the lower right pocket for male soldiers and on the right side parallel to the waistline for female soldiers. Soldiers can wear the CSIB on the new blue Army Service Uniform, Class A and Class B. The CSIB cannot be worn on the Army Combat Uniform (ACU) or the discontinued Army Green Uniform. U.S. soldiers will continue to wear the subdued Shoulder Sleeve Insignia-Former Wartime Service on their right sleeve of the ACU blouse to denote combat service. The CSIB is ranked fifth in the order of precedence for identification badges.
