= United States special operations forces =

Emblem of United States Special Operations Command

United States special operations forces (SOF) are the active and reserve component forces of the United States Army, Marine Corps, Navy, Air Force, and Space Force within the US military, as designated by the secretary of defense and specifically organized, trained, and equipped to conduct and support special operations. All active and reserve special operations forces are assigned to the United States Special Operations Command (USSOCOM).

== Composition ==
Component commands

- United States Special Operations Command (SOCOM)
  - Joint Special Operations Command (JSOC)
  - United States Army Special Operations Command (USASOC)
  - United States Marine Forces Special Operations Command (MARSOC)
  - United States Naval Special Warfare Command (NSWC)
  - United States Air Force Special Operations Command (AFSOC)
  - United States Space Forces – Special Operations Command (SPACEFOR-SOC)
  - Theater Special Operations Commands
    - Special Operations Command Africa (SOCAFRICA)
    - Special Operations Command Central (SOCCENT)
      - Joint Interagency Task Force – Counter Terrorism (JIATF-CT – Afghanistan)
      - Special Operations Command Central Forward (SOCCENT FWD)
      - Special Operation Command Forward Yemen (SOC FWD-Y)
      - SOCCENT Cultural Engagement Group (CEG)
    - Special Operations Command Europe (SOCEUR)
      - Joint Special Operations Air Component Europe
    - Special Operations Command Pacific (SOCPAC)
    - Special Operations Command South (SOCSOUTH)
    - Special Operations Command North (SOCNORTH)
    - Special Operations Command Korea (SOCKOR)

★★★ Represents a unit led by a lieutenant general or vice admiral
★★ Represents a unit led by a major general or rear admiral (upper half)
★ Represents a unit led by a brigadier general or rear admiral (lower half)

=== Joint Special Operations Command ===
Joint Special Operations Command (JSOC) ★★★

- 1st Special Forces Operational Detachment-Delta (Airborne) (1st SFOD-D) (A) (USA)
  - A Squadron (Assault)
  - B Squadron (Assault)
  - C Squadron (Assault)
  - D Squadron (Assault)
  - E Squadron (Aviation)
  - G Squadron (Intelligence, Reconnaissance, & Surveillance)
  - Combat Support Squadron
  - Signal Squadron
- Naval Special Warfare Development Group (USN)
- Regimental Reconnaissance Company (RRC) (USA)
- 24th Special Tactics Squadron (24th STS) (USAF)
- Joint Communications Unit (Joint Service)
- Joint Cyber Operations Group (JCOG) (Formerly Joint Communications Integration Element/JCIE)(Joint Service)
- Joint Special Operations Command Intelligence Brigade (JSOCIB)
- 427th Special Operations Squadron (USAF)
- Intelligence Support Activity (ISA)

=== United States Army ===
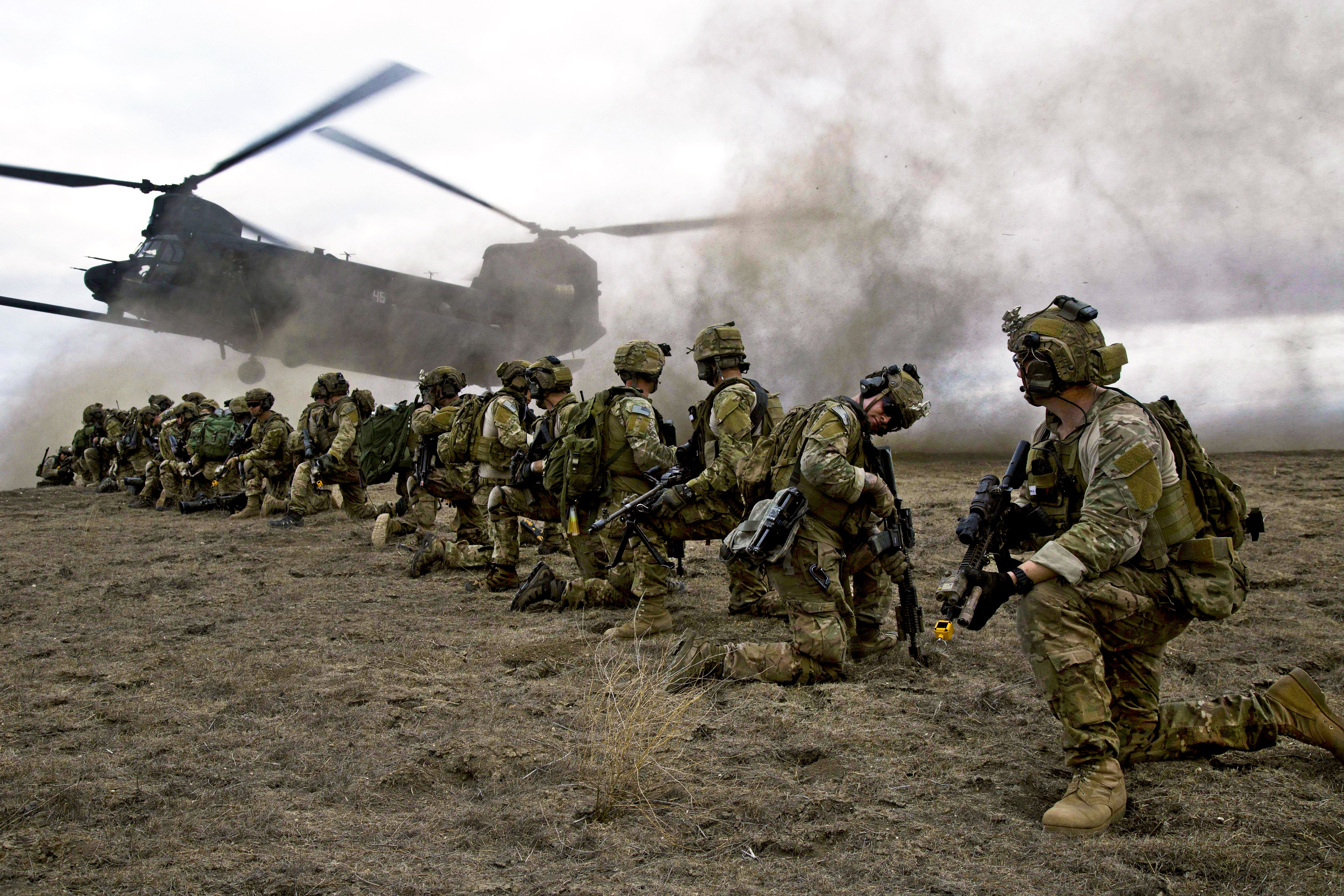
Army Rangers during a training operation

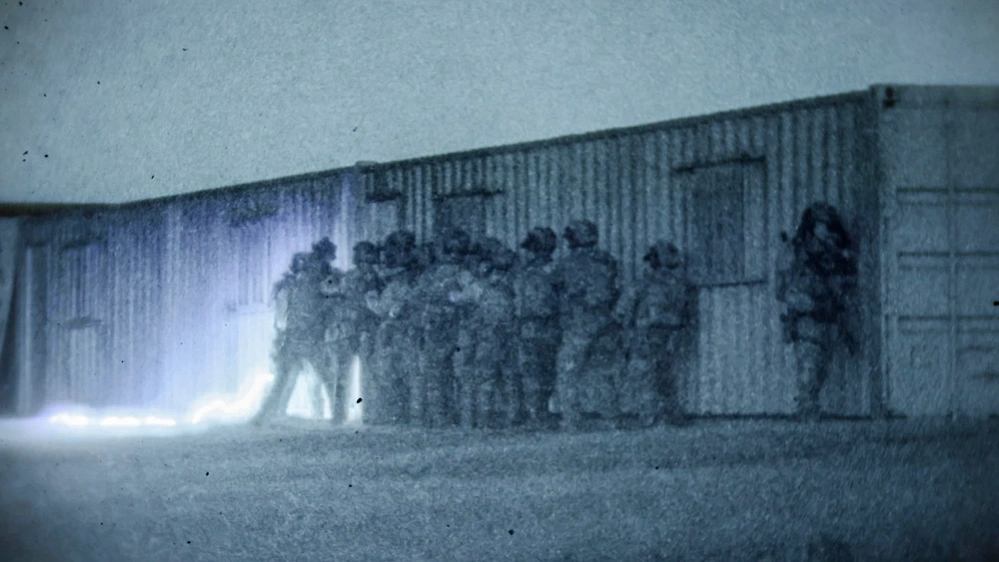
Army Green Berets, conduct a nighttime raid during a joint operation alongside the Coast Guard's Maritime Security Response Team (MSRT)

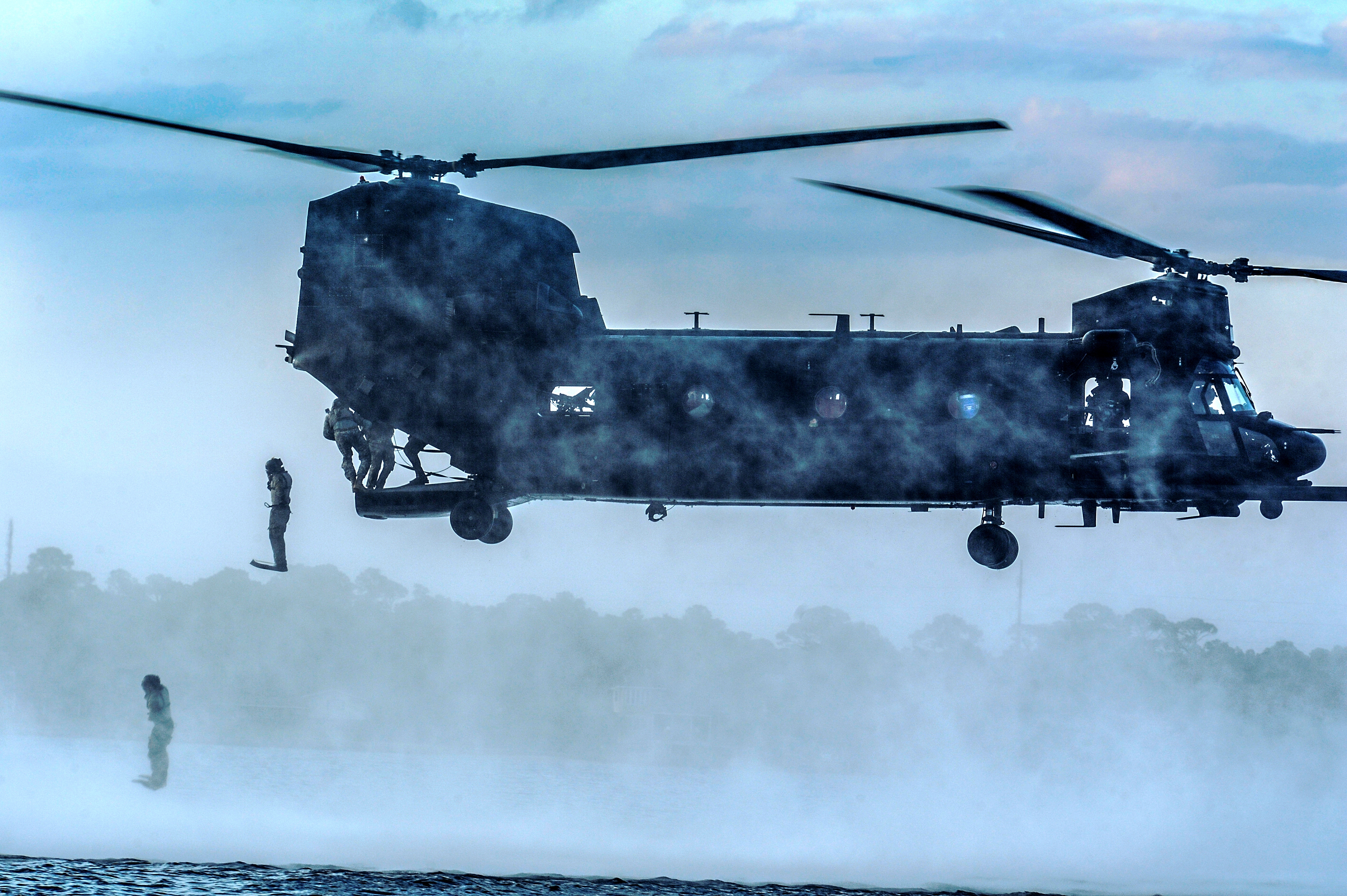
160th SOAR MH-47 unloading 23rd Special Tactics Squadron operators at Wynnehaven Beach, Florida, April 9, 2013

- United States Army Special Operations Command (USASOC) ★★★
  - 1st Special Forces Command (Airborne) ★★
    - 1st Special Forces Group (Airborne)
    - 3rd Special Forces Group (Airborne)
    - 5th Special Forces Group (Airborne)
    - 7th Special Forces Group (Airborne)
    - 10th Special Forces Group (Airborne)
    - 19th Special Forces Group (Airborne) (Army National Guard)
    - 20th Special Forces Group (Airborne) (Army National Guard)
    - 4th Psychological Operations Group (Airborne)
    - 8th Psychological Operations Group (Airborne)
    - 95th Civil Affairs Brigade (Airborne)
      - 91st Civil Affairs Battalion
      - 92nd Civil Affairs Battalion
      - 96th Civil Affairs Battalion
      - 97th Civil Affairs Battalion
      - 98th Civil Affairs Battalion
    - 528th Sustainment Brigade, Special Operations (Airborne)
      - Special Troops Battalion
      - 112th Special Operations Signal Battalion
      - 389th Military Intelligence Battalion (Airborne)
  - 75th Ranger Regiment
    - 1st Ranger Battalion
    - 2nd Ranger Battalion
    - 3rd Ranger Battalion
    - Regimental Military Intelligence Battalion (Intelligence, Reconnaissance, & Surveillance)
    - Special Troops Battalion
      - Regimental Reconnaissance Company
  - U.S. Army Special Operations Aviation Command (USASOAC) ★
    - 160th Special Operations Aviation Regiment (Airborne)
    - Special Operations Aviation Training Battalion
  - United States Army John F. Kennedy Special Warfare Center and School (USAJFKSWCS) ★★
    - 1st Special Warfare Training Group (Airborne)
    - Special Warfare Education Group (Airborne)
    - Special Warfare Medical Group (Airborne)

=== United States Marine Corps ===
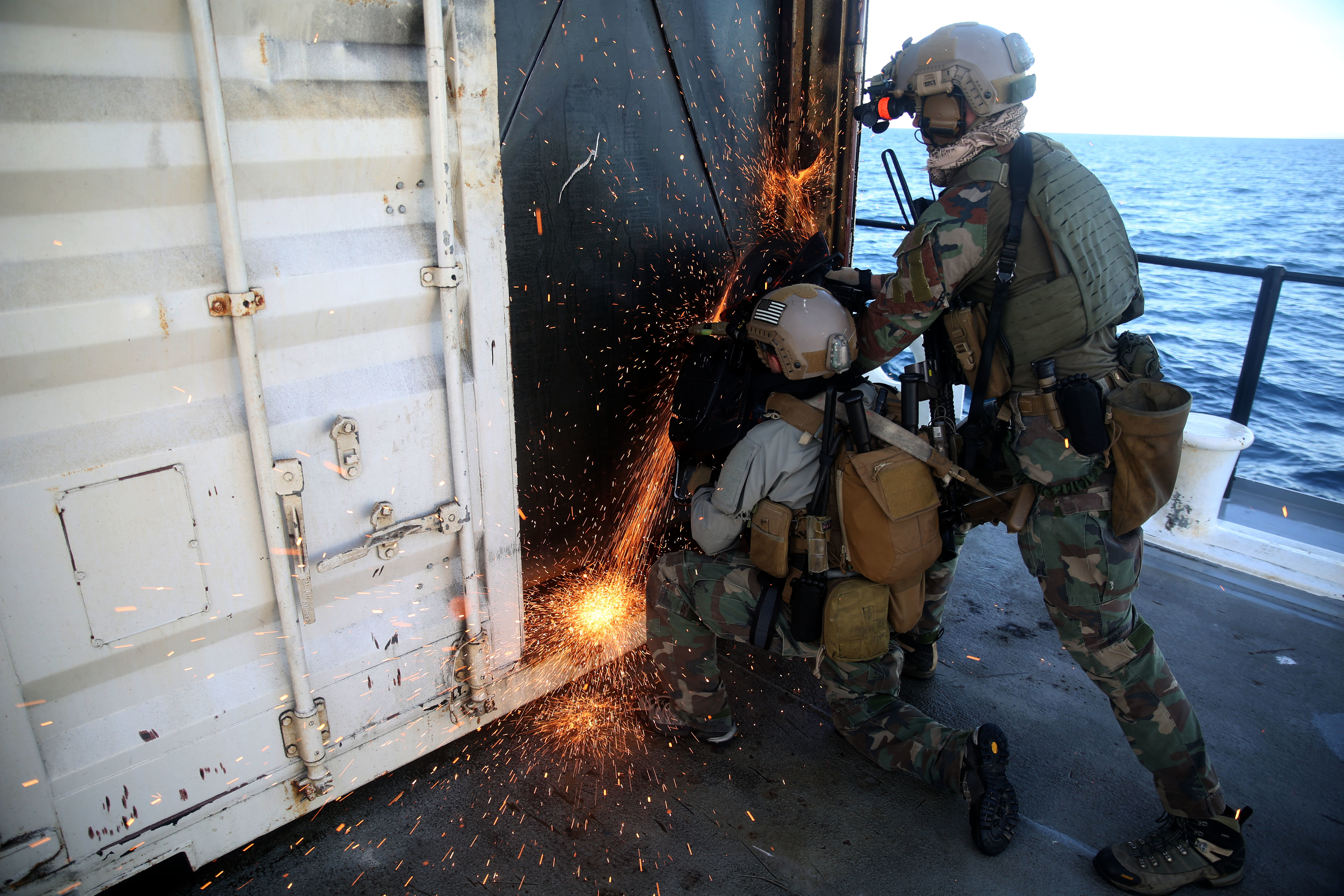
Marine Raiders fine-tune Visit, Board, Search and Seizure (VBSS) skills.

- United States Marine Corps Forces Special Operations Command (MARSOC) ★★
  - Marine Raider Regiment
    - 1st Marine Raider Battalion
    - 2nd Marine Raider Battalion
    - 3rd Marine Raider Battalion
  - Marine Raider Support Group
    - 1st Marine Raider Support Battalion
    - 2nd Marine Raider Support Battalion
    - 3rd Marine Raider Support Battalion
  - Marine Raider Training Center

=== United States Navy ===
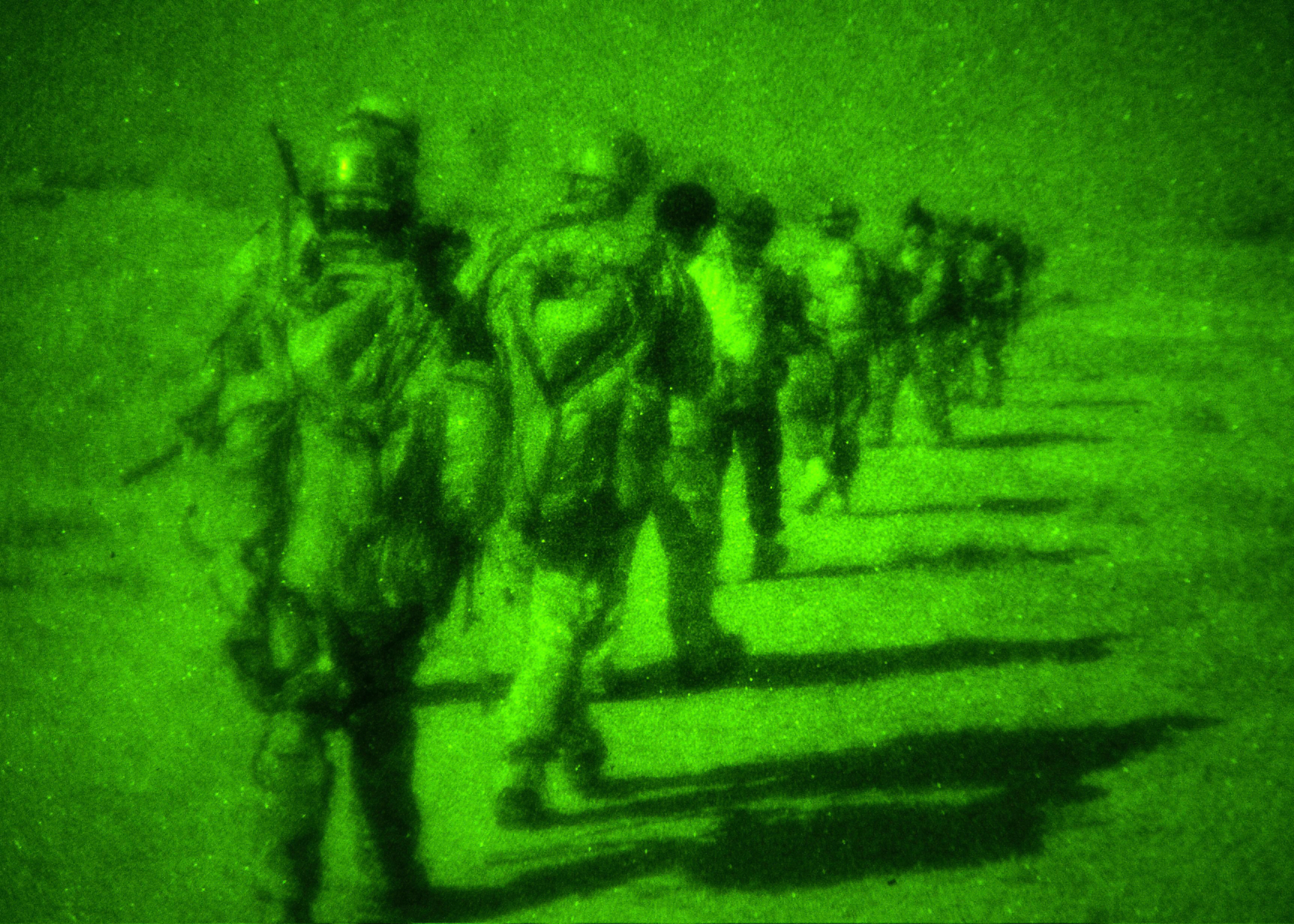
Navy SEALs during night operation in Afghanistan.

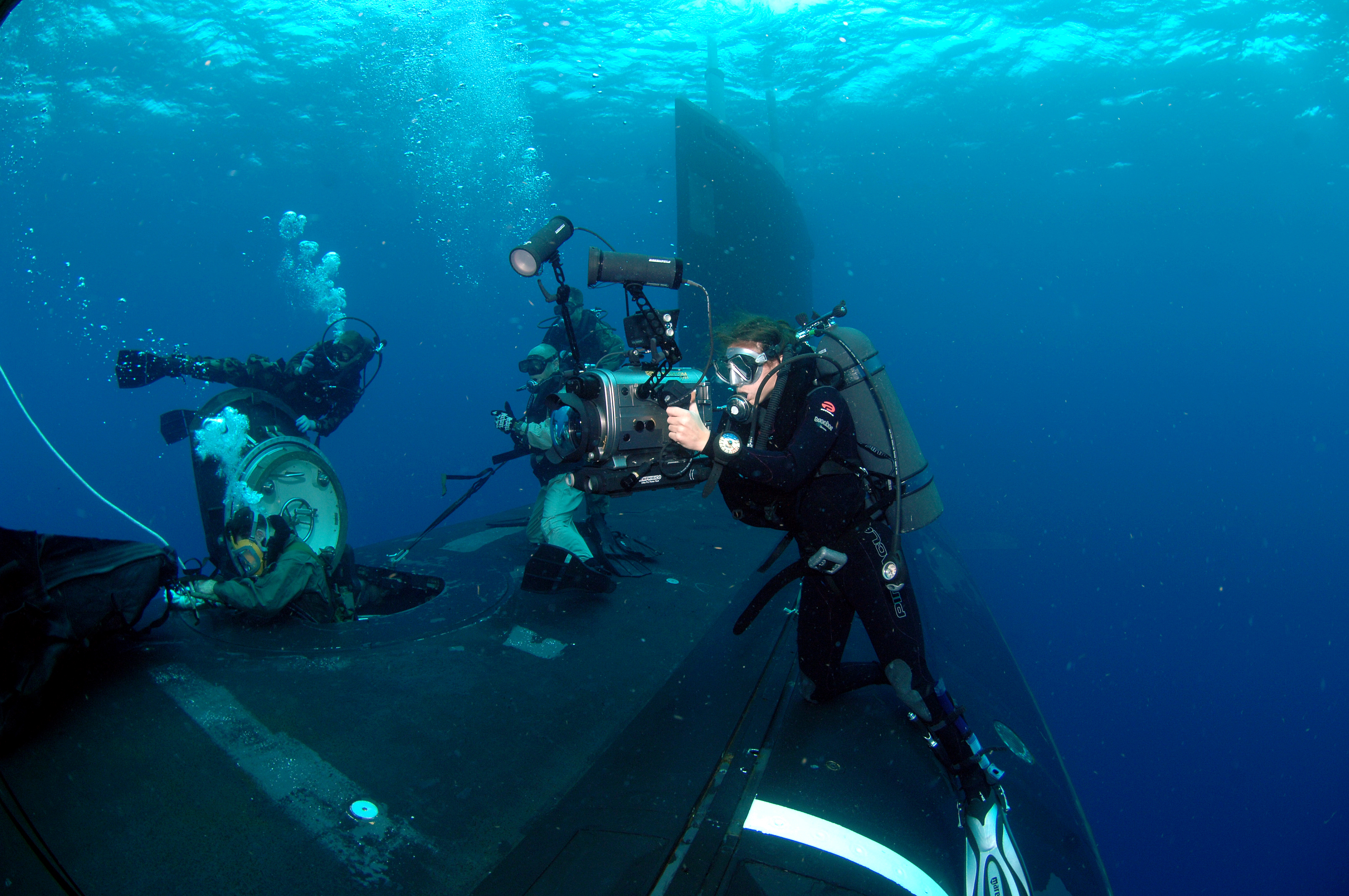
SEAL Delivery Vehicle Team (SDV) 2 conduct diving lock out

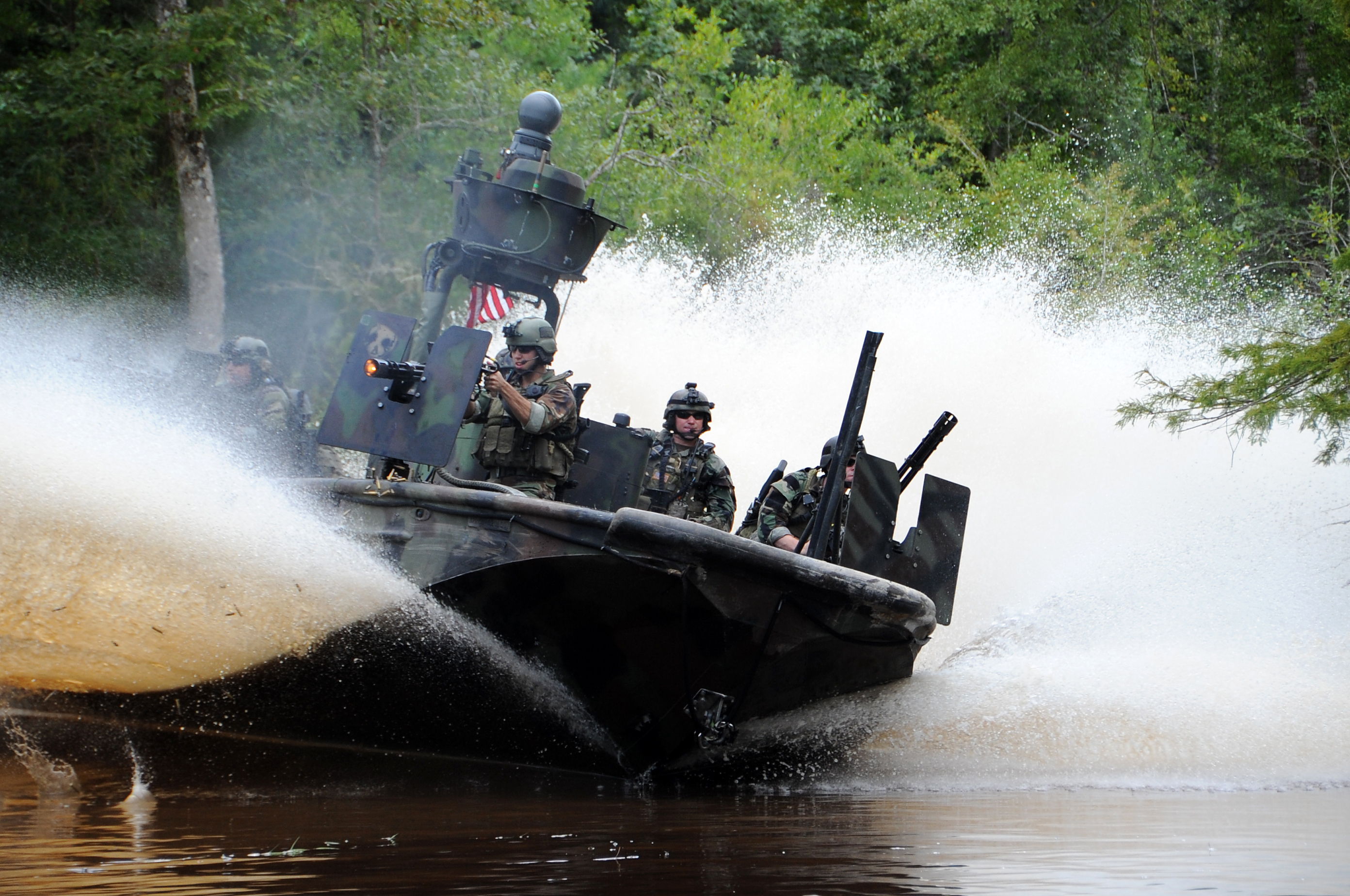
SWCC from Special Boat Team 22 operating a SOC-R

- Naval Special Warfare Command (NAVSPECWARCOM) ★★
  - Naval Special Warfare Group ONE
    - SEAL Team 1
    - SEAL Team 3
    - SEAL Team 5
    - SEAL Team 7
    - Logistics Support Unit 1
    - Naval Special Warfare (NSW) Unit 1
    - Naval Special Warfare (NSW) Unit 3
  - Naval Special Warfare Group TWO
    - SEAL Team 2
    - SEAL Team 4
    - SEAL Team 8
    - SEAL Team 10
    - Logistics Support Unit 2
    - Naval Special Warfare (NSW) Unit 2
    - Naval Special Warfare (NSW) Unit 4
    - Naval Special Warfare Unit (NSW) 10
  - Naval Special Warfare Group FOUR
    - Special Boat Team 12 (SBT-12)
    - Special Boat Team 20 (SBT-20)
    - Special Boat Team 22 (SBT-22)
    - Naval Small Craft Instruction and Technical Training School (NAVSCIATTS)
  - Naval Special Warfare Group EIGHT
    - SEAL Delivery Vehicle Team 1 (SDVT-1)
    - SEAL Delivery Vehicle Team 2 (SDVT-2); was reactivated on 8 March 2019
    - Logistics Support Unit 3
    - Special Reconnaissance Team 1
    - Special Reconnaissance Team 2
    - Training Detachment 3
    - Mission Support Center
  - Naval Special Warfare Group ELEVEN
    - SEAL Team 17 (Navy Reserve)
    - SEAL Team 18 (Navy Reserve)
  - Naval Special Warfare Center
    - Basic Training Command
    - Advanced Training Command

=== United States Air Force ===
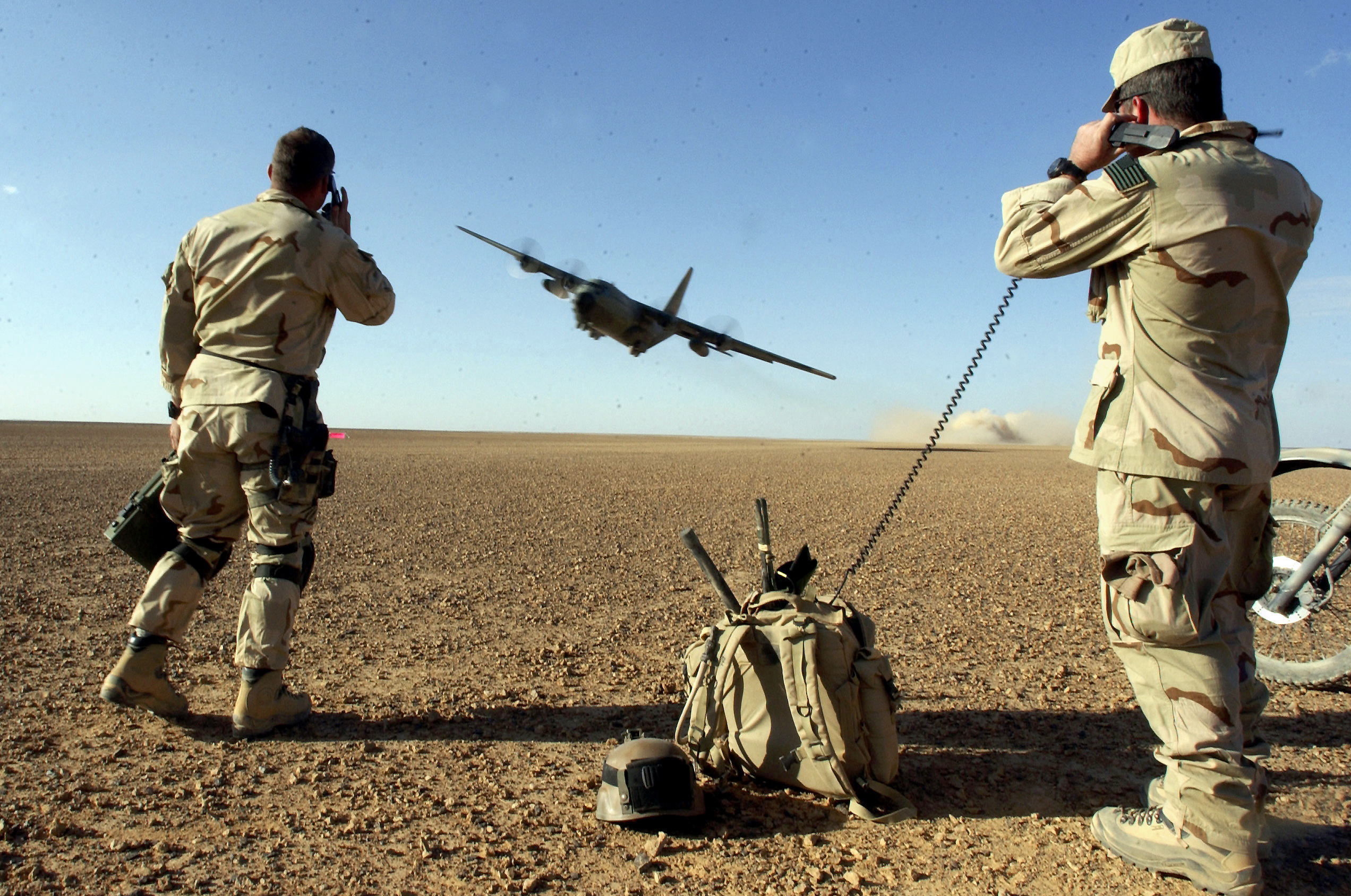
Air Force Combat Controllers provide air traffic control for a C-130 in Afghanistan

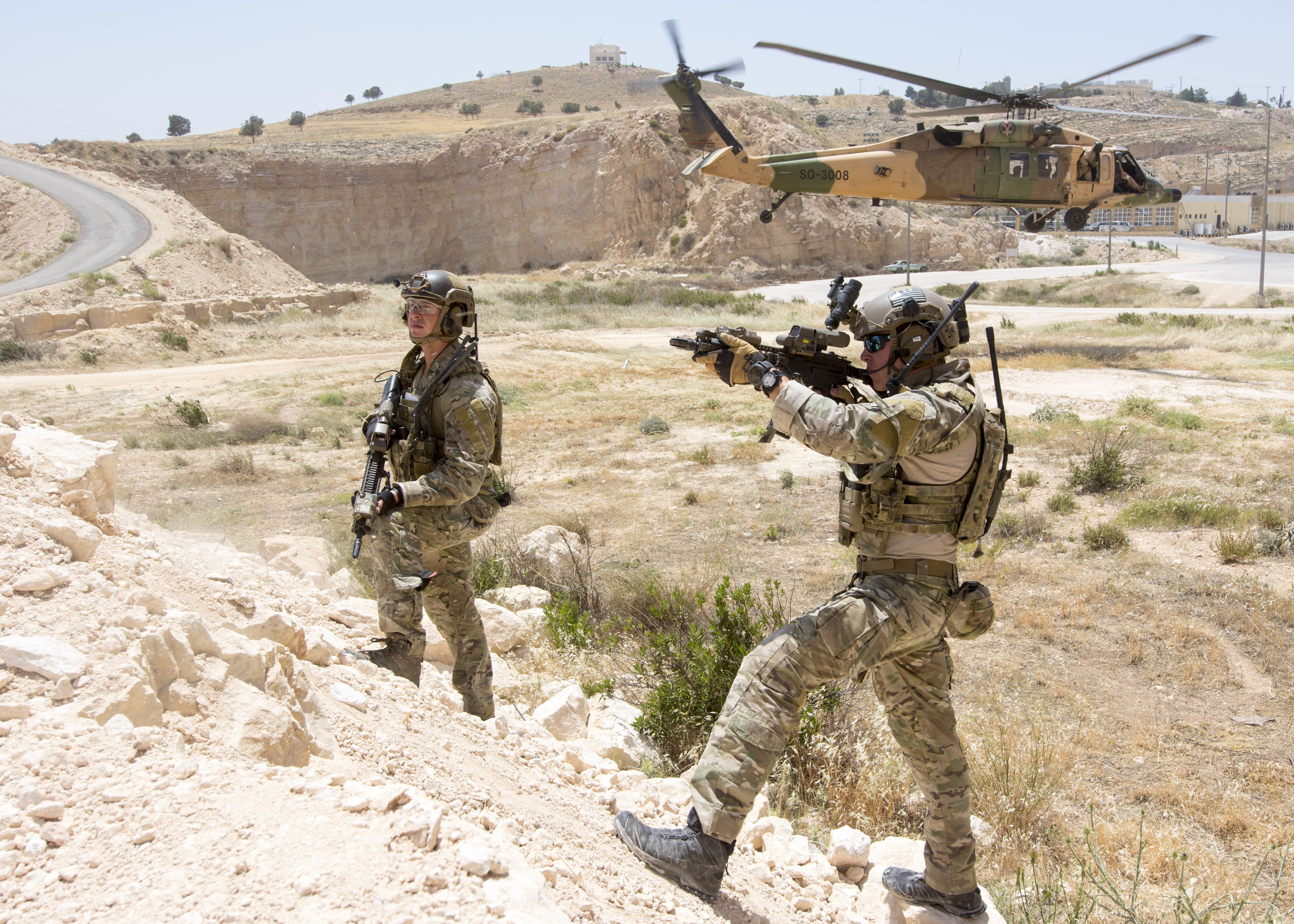
23rd STS Air Force commandos training in Jordan

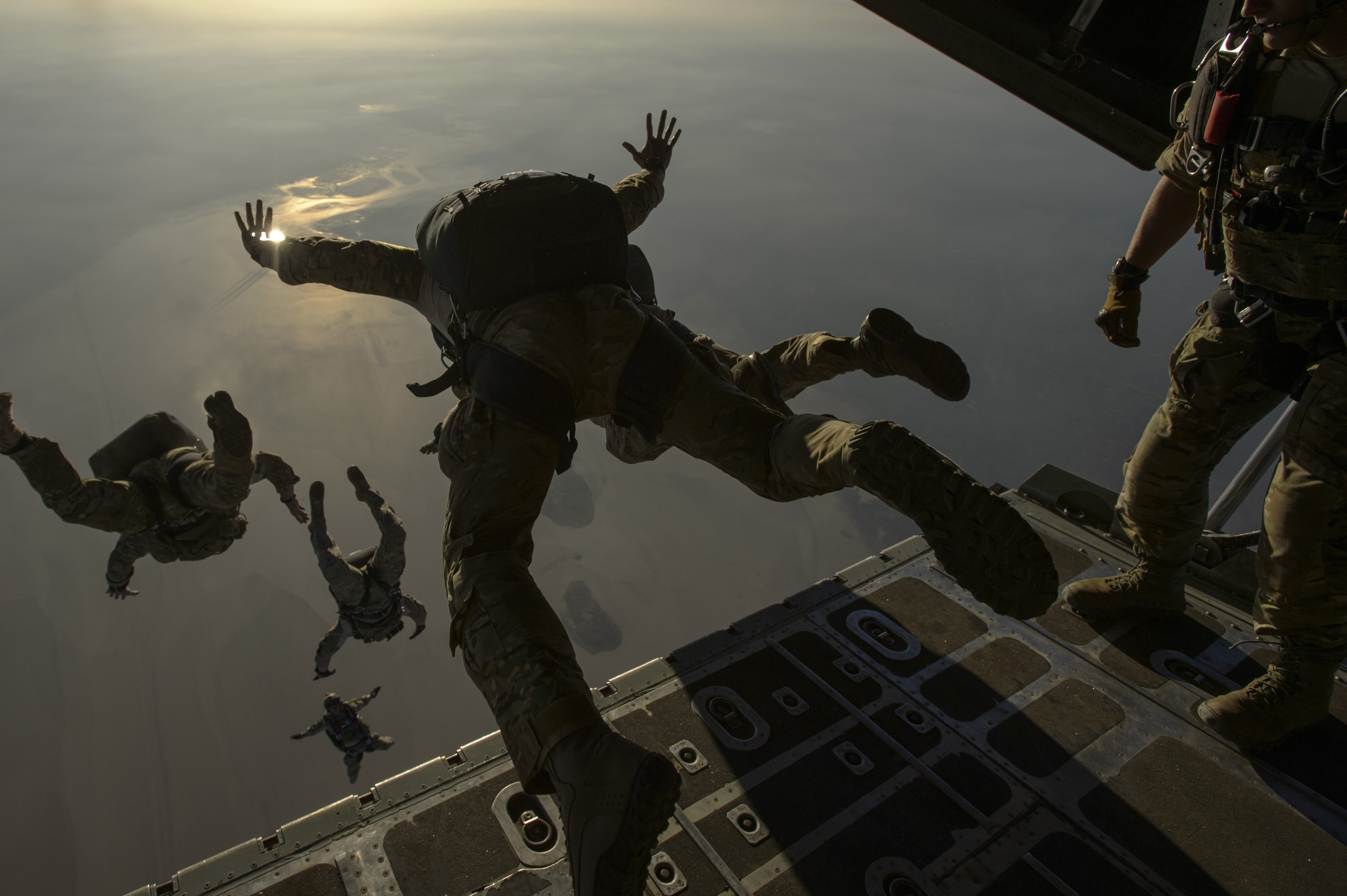
Air Force Pararescuemen (PJs) jump from an HC-130J Combat King II near Camp Lemonnier

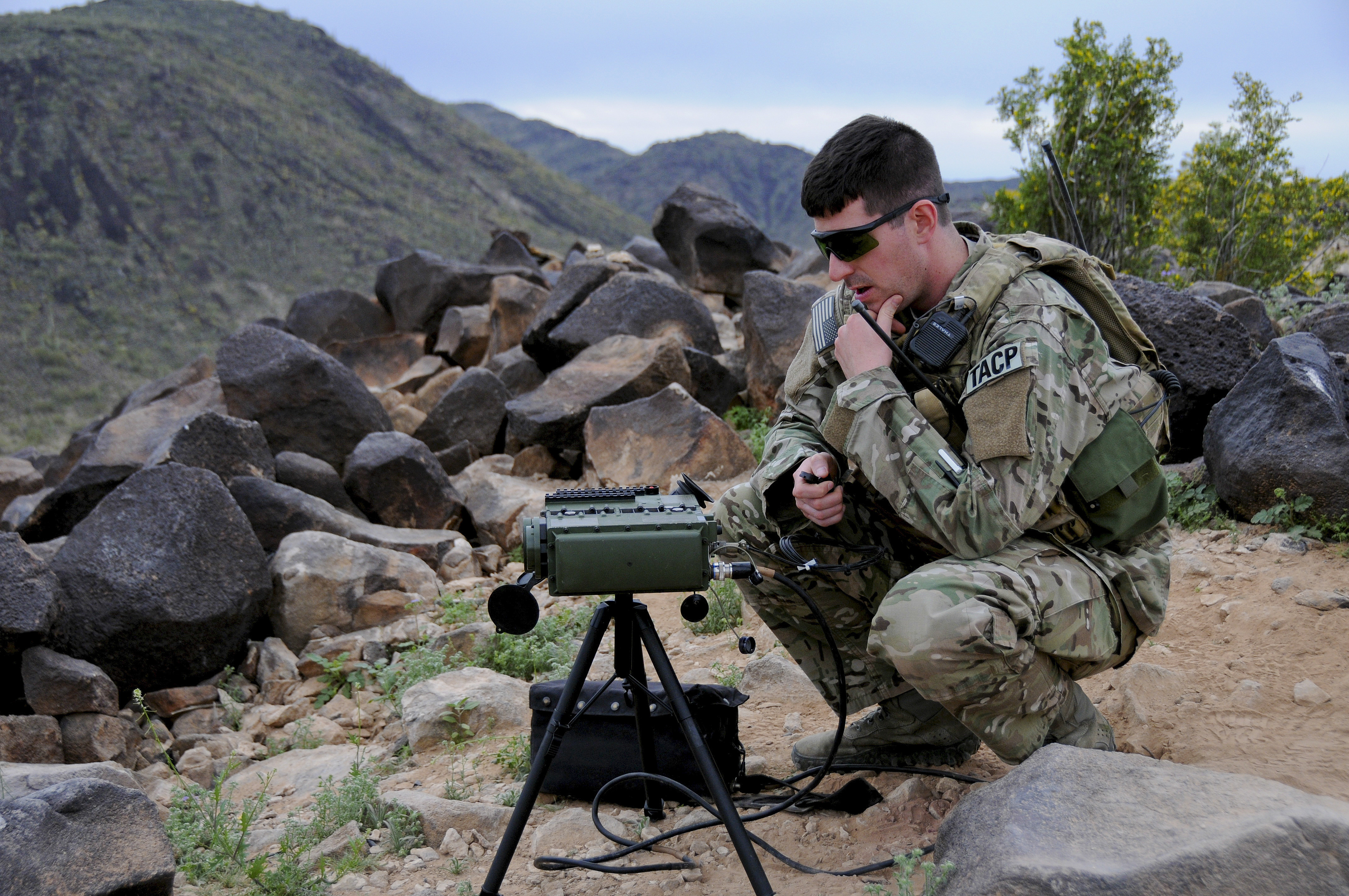
Air Force TACP training with a SOFLAM at Barry Goldwater Air Force Range, Arizona

- Air Force Special Operations Command (AFSOC) ★★★
  - 1st Special Operations Wing
    - 1st Special Operations Group
      - 4th Special Operations Squadron
      - 8th Special Operations Squadron
      - 9th Special Operations Squadron
      - 15th Special Operations Squadron
      - 23rd Weather Squadron
      - 34th Special Operations Squadron
      - 319th Special Operations Squadron
  - 24th Special Operations Wing
    - 720th Special Tactics Group
      - 17th Special Tactics Squadron
      - 21st Special Tactics Squadron
      - 22nd Special Tactics Squadron
      - 23rd Special Tactics Squadron
      - 26th Special Tactics Squadron
      - 720th Operations Support Squadron
    - 724th Special Tactics Group
      - 24th Special Tactics Squadron
      - 724th Operations Support Squadron
      - 724th Intelligence Squadron
      - 724th Special Tactics Support Squadron
  - 27th Special Operations Wing
    - 27th Special Operations Group
      - 3rd Special Operations Squadron
      - 9th Special Operations Squadron
      - 16th Special Operations Squadron
      - 20th Special Operations Squadron
      - 33rd Special Operations Squadron
      - 56th Special Operations Intelligence Squadron
      - 73rd Special Operations Squadron
      - 318th Special Operations Squadron
      - 524th Special Operations Squadron
  - 137th Special Operations Wing (Air National Guard)
  - 193rd Special Operations Wing (Air National Guard)
    - 193rd Special Operations Squadron
  - 919th Special Operations Wing (Air Force Reserve)
    - 919th Special Operations Group
      - 2nd Special Operations Squadron
      - 5th Special Operations Squadron
      - 711th Special Operations Squadron
  - 352nd Special Operations Wing (Provisional)
    - 7th Special Operations Squadron
    - 67th Special Operations Squadron
    - 321st Special Tactics Squadron
  - 353rd Special Operations Group
    - 1st Special Operations Squadron
    - 17th Special Operations Squadron
    - Detachment 1, 43rd Intelligence Squadron
    - 320th Special Tactics Squadron
  - 492nd Special Operations Wing ★
    - 19th Special Operations Squadron
    - 6th Special Operations Squadron
    - 18th Flight Test Squadron
    - 280th Combat Communications Squadron
    - 371st Special Operations Combat Training Squadron
    - 551st Special Operations Squadron
    - United States Air Force Special Operations School

== SOF career fields ==
=== United States Army ===
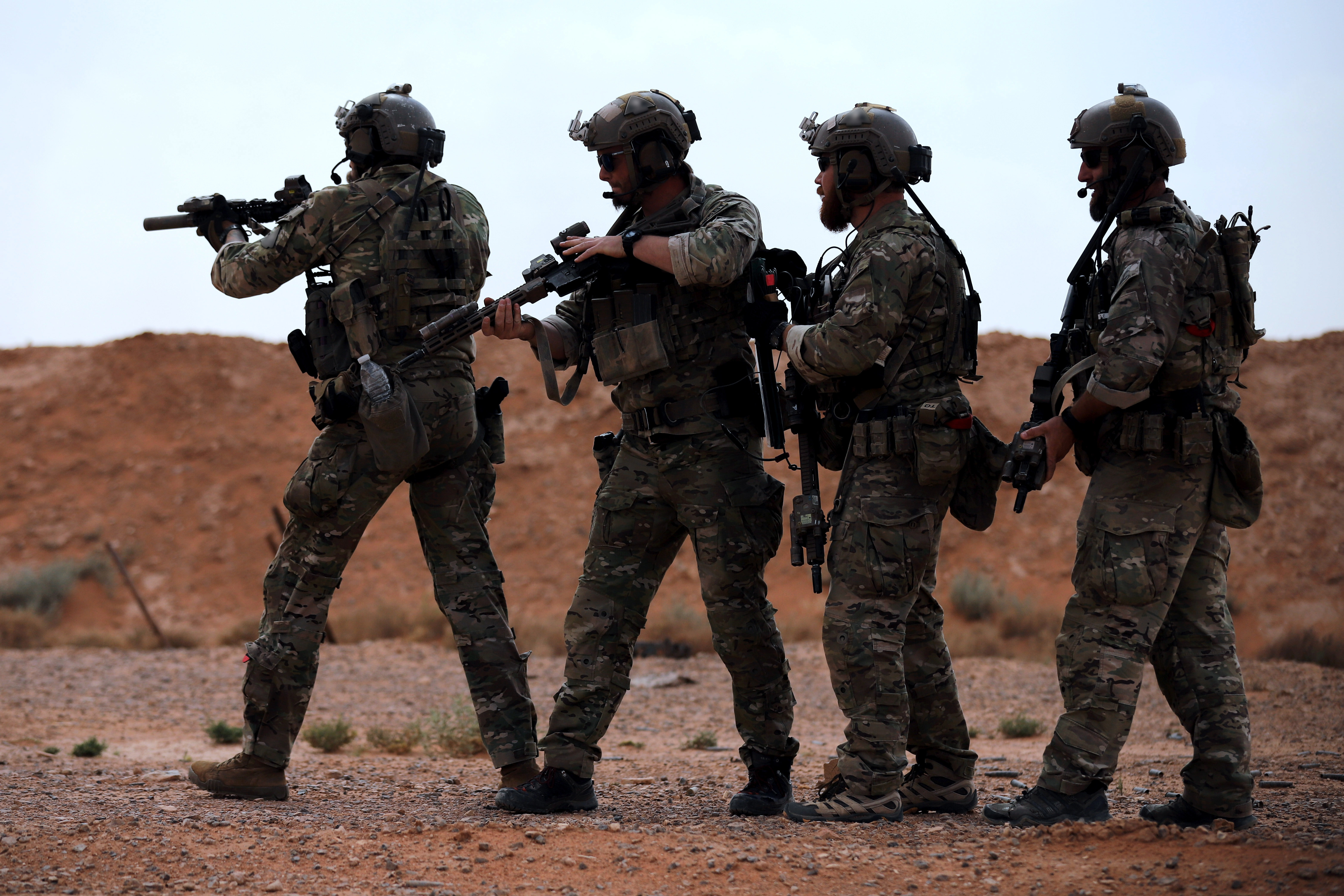
Army Special Forces (Green Berets) during breach and clear training near al-Tanf, Syria

- Special Forces
- Rangers
- Psychological Operations (Military Information Support Operators) -- active duty units that fall under United States Army Special Operations Command (USASOC) only; United States Army Reserve and National Guard psyops units are conventional forces and not SOF.
- Civil Affairs Soldiers -- similar to MISO, only active duty units that fall under USASOC are SOF; Reserve and National Guard Civil Affairs units are conventional forces and not SOF.
- Other career fields, such as aviators, HUMINT collectors, and SIGINT collectors, when serving in units that fall under USASOC or USSOCOM command.

=== United States Marine Corps ===
- Special Operations Officers
- United States Marine Corps Critical Skills Operator (CSO)
- Special Operations Capabilities Specialist -- when assigned to MARSOC only.
- Combat Services Specialist -- when assigned to MARSOC only.

=== United States Navy ===
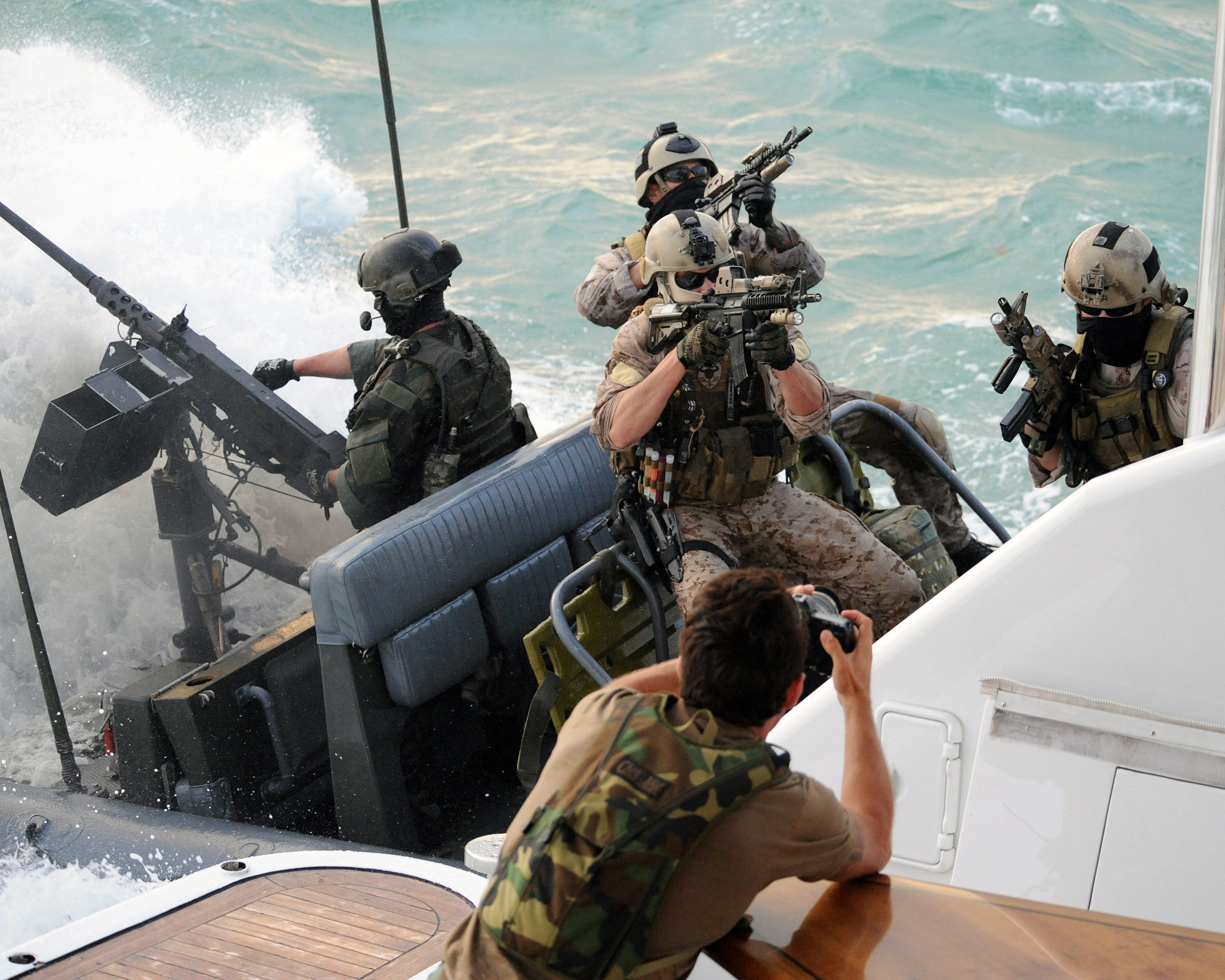
Special Boat Team 20 navigates a rigid-hull inflatable boat while a SEAL team boards a yacht

- Navy SEALs
- Special Warfare Combat Crewmen (SWCC)
- Special amphibious reconnaissance corpsman (SARC) -- when assigned to MARSOC and NSWC only
- United States Navy EOD (EOD) - when assigned to NSWC only
- United States Navy Diver (ND/UCT) -- when assigned to NSWC only

=== United States Air Force ===
- Combat Control (CCT)
- Special Reconnaissance (SR)
- Special Tactics Officer (STO)
- Special Operations Surgical Team (SOST)
- Combat Aviation Advisor (CAA)
- Pararescuemen* (PJ)
- Combat Rescue Officer* (CRO)
- Tactical Air Control Party** (ST TACP)
- Tactical Air Control Party Officer** (ST TACP-O)

* Not all PJs/CROs are assigned to AFSOC; many are assigned to Rescue Squadrons within ACC, PACAF, and USAFE. There is no difference in training or selection between Rescue and Special Tactics assignments.

** TACP-O/TACP Airmen must undergo additional selection and training to be assigned to AFSOC Special Tactics Squadrons. Most are assigned to ACC and support conventional Army Units.

=== United States Space Force ===
- Space Special Warfare operator

== U.S. special operations centers, schools, and courses ==
- Joint Special Operations University – Hurlburt Field
- Advanced Special Operations Techniques Course (ASOTC) – Fort Bragg
- John F. Kennedy Special Warfare Center and School – Fort Bragg
- Military Free Fall Advanced Tactical Infiltration Course (ATIC) – Yuma Proving Ground, Arizona
- Naval Special Warfare Center – Coronado, California
- Naval Special Warfare Advanced Training Command, Imperial Beach, CA
- Naval Small Craft Instruction and Technical Training School- John C. Stennis Space Center, Mississippi
- Recon and Surveillance Leaders Course (RSLC) – Fort Benning, Georgia
- Special Forces Advanced Urban Combat (SFAUC) – Fort Bragg
- Special Forces Combat Diver Qualification Course – Key West, Florida
- Special Forces Sniper Course (SFSC) – Fort Bragg
- Special Forces Advanced Targeting Reconnaissance Target Analysis Exploitation Techniques (SFARTAETC)
- Special Forces Physical Surveillance Course
- SOF Sensitive Site Exploitation, Technical Exploitation Course
- SOF Sensitive Site Exploitation, Operator Advanced Course
- Special Forces Master Mountaineering Course (Level 1)
- Special Forces Senior Mountaineering Course (Level 2)
- Winter Warfare, Mountain and Cold Weather Operations
- Special Forces Technical Surveillance (SFTSC)
- Operational Emergency Medical Skills Course (SOF)
- Special Missions Training Center/Joint Maritime Training Center, Camp Lejeune, North Carolina
- Marine Raider Training Center – Camp Lejeune
  - Marine Corps Special Operations Training Group
- US Army Ranger Assessment and Selection Program (RASP) – Fort Benning, Georgia
- US Army Small Unit Ranger Tactics (SURT) – Fort Benning, Georgia
- USAF Combat Dive Course – NDSTC Panama City, Florida
- USAF Combat Control School – Pope Field, North Carolina
- USAF Pararescue Recovery Specialist Course – Kirtland AFB, NM
- USAF Special Operations School – Hurlburt Field, FL
  - Special Tactics Training Squadron
- Special Operations Terminal Attack Control Course (SOTACC), Yuma Proving Ground, Arizona
- JTAC Advanced Instructor Course – Nellis AFB, NV
- Naval Strike and Air Warfare Center, Naval Air Station Fallon, NV
- US Navy Naval Diving and Salvage Training Center (NDSTC), Panama City Beach
- US Navy Rescue Swimmer school, Pensacola, Florida
- US Coast Guard Aviation Survival Technician Training Center, Coast Guard Air Station Elizabeth City, North Carolina
- International Special Training Center (ISTC) – Pfullendorf, Federal Republic of Germany

== See also ==
- U.S. Air Force Deployed Aircraft Ground Response Element (DAGRE)
- Intelligence Support Activity
- Special Activities Center
