= 1st Special Forces Command (Airborne) =

Division-sized component of US Army Special Operations Command

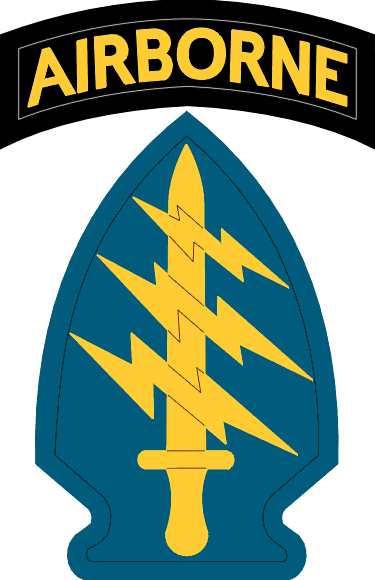
- 1st Special Forces Command Shoulder Sleeve Insignia: The arrowhead alludes to the American Indian's basic skills in which Special Forces personnel are trained to a high degree. The dagger represents the unconventional nature of Special Forces operations, and the three lightning flashes, their ability to strike rapidly by air, water or land.
- Active: 1989–present
- Country: United States
- Allegiance: United States Special Operations Command
- Branch: United States Army
- Type: Special Operations
- Size: 22,971 personnel authorized (FY2014): 22,845 military personnel; 126 civilian personnel
- Part of: US Army Special Operations Command
- Garrison/HQ: Fort Bragg, North Carolina
- Engagements: War on terror: Operation Inherent Resolve

Commanders
- Commanding General: Brigadier General Joseph W. Wortham II
- Deputy Commander: Vacant
- Command Sergeant Major: CSM David R. Waldo

Insignia
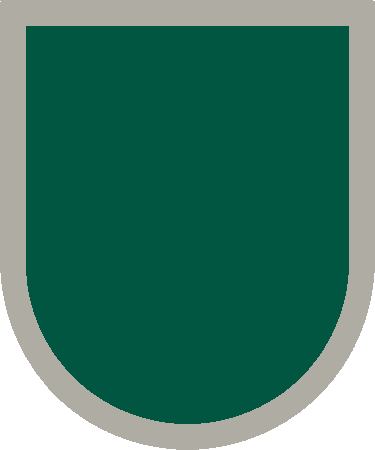
- Beret flash of the command

- Distinctive unit insignia and regimental insignia of the special forces

1st Special Forces Command overview (4:06)

The 1st Special Forces Command (Airborne) is a division-level special operations forces command within the United States Army Special Operations Command. The command was first established in 1989 and reorganized in 2014 grouping together the Army Special Forces (a.k.a. "the Green Berets"), psychological operations, civil affairs, and support troops into a single organization operating out of its headquarters at Fort Bragg, North Carolina.

== Mission ==
The mission of 1SFC (A) is to organize, equip, train, and validate forces to conduct full-spectrum special operations in support of United States Special Operations Command (USSOCOM), Geographic Combatant Commanders, American ambassadors, and other governmental agencies. The new command includes all seven special forces groups (including the five active duty and two Army National Guard groups), one psychological operations group, a civil affairs brigade, and a sustainment brigade. The Command has the ability to rapidly deploy a high-level headquarters to run sustained, unconventional campaigns in foreign theaters.

1st Special Forces Command (Airborne)
| Name | Headquarters | Structure and purpose |
|---|---|---|
| Special Forces Groups | Various | Each special forces group is designed to deploy and execute nine doctrinal missions: unconventional warfare, foreign internal defense, direct action, counter-insurgency, special reconnaissance, counter-terrorism, information operations, counterproliferation of weapon of mass destruction, and security force assistance via seven geographically focused groups: 1st Special Forces Group (Airborne) (USINDOPACOM); 3rd Special Forces Group (Airborne) (USAFRICOM); 5th Special Forces Group (Airborne) (USCENTCOM); 7th Special Forces Group (Airborne) (USSOUTHCOM); 10th Special Forces Group (Airborne) (USEUCOM); 19th Special Forces Group (Airborne) (ARNG) (USINDOPACOM and USCENTCOM); 20th Special Forces Group (Airborne) (ARNG) (USSOUTHCOM) |
| 4th Psychological Operations Group (Airborne) | Ft. Bragg, North Carolina | Tasked to work with foreign nations to induce or reinforce behavior favorable to U.S. objectives via two operational groups that provide scalable, regionally oriented, and culturally astute special operations psychological operations forces to combatant commanders, U.S. ambassadors, and other agencies. Their mission is to advise, plan, develop, synchronize, deliver and assess military information support operations and other information related capabilities across the range of military operations.: 1st Psychological Operations Battalion (Airborne) (USSOUTHCOM); 5th Psychological Operations Battalion (Airborne) (USINDOPACOM); 6th Psychological Operations Battalion (Airborne) (USEUCOM); 7th Psychological Operations Battalion (Airborne) (USAFRICOM); 8th Psychological Operations Battalion (Airborne) (USCENTCOM); 9th Psychological Operations Battalion (Airborne) (Tactical) Note: Subordination suspected after deactivation of 8th POG(A) |
| 95th Civil Affairs Brigade (Special Operations) (Airborne) | Ft. Bragg, North Carolina | The 95th enables military commanders and U.S. ambassadors to achieve national objectives by countering adversary control and improving a partner's control over populations. The 95th accomplishes this as a member of the ARSOF team and through its relationships with the U.S. Department of State, government and non-governmental organizations, and local populations via five geographically focused battalions: 91st Civil Affairs Battalion (Airborne) (USAFRICOM); 92nd Civil Affairs Battalion (Airborne) (USEUCOM); 96th Civil Affairs Battalion (Airborne) (USCENTCOM); 97th Civil Affairs Battalion (Airborne) (USINDOPACOM); 98th Civil Affairs Battalion (Airborne) (USSOUTHCOM) |
| 528th Sustainment Brigade (Special Operations) (Airborne) | Ft. Bragg, North Carolina | The 528th provides enduring logistics, signal support, and medical care to Army Special Operations Forces (RSOF) and joint elements worldwide and is task organized with a various elements based at each Theater Special Operations Command (TSOC) and Army Service Component Command (ASCC) via the following units: 112th Special Operations Signal Battalion (Airborne); 389th Military Intelligence Battalion (Special Operations) (Airborne)—assigned to 1st SFC(A) G2; Special Troops Battalion; Support Operations |

== 1st Special Forces Regiment ==
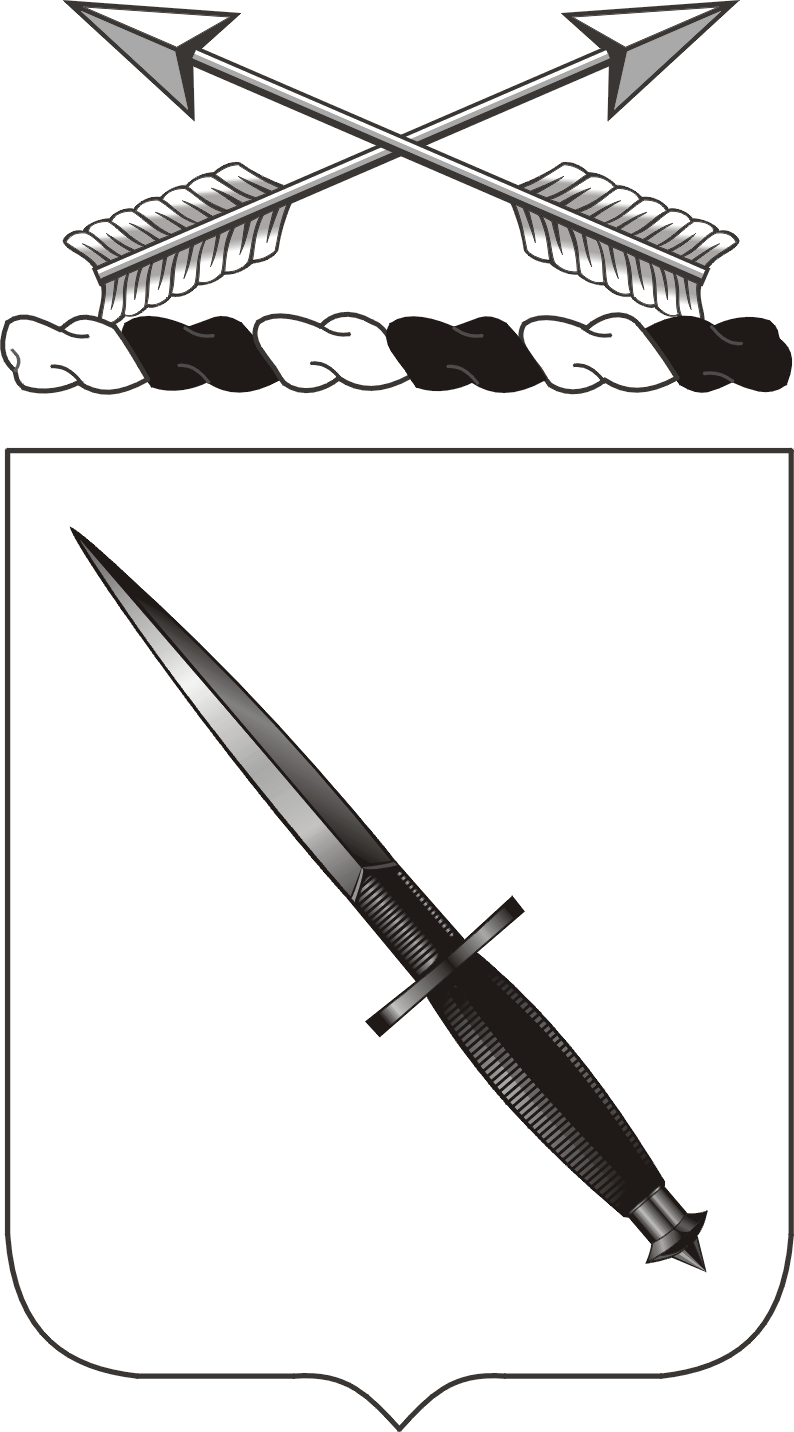
1st Special Forces Regiment Coat of Arms

1st Special Forces Distinctive Unit and Regimental Insignia

All seven Special Forces Groups were redesignated as part of the 1st Special Forces Regiment, and as such, were made part of its historical lineage, with all the campaign credits and battle honors that go with it. The Regiment is ceremonial, not operational.

== See also ==
- United States Special Operations Command
  - Joint Special Operations Command
- United States Army Special Operations Command
- United States Marine Corps Forces Special Operations Command
- United States Naval Special Warfare Command
- Air Force Special Operations Command
- Army Special Operations Brigade – the equivalent to the command within the British Armed Forces
