= 97th Civil Affairs Battalion (Airborne) =

97th Civil Affairs Battalion (Special Operations)(Airborne)
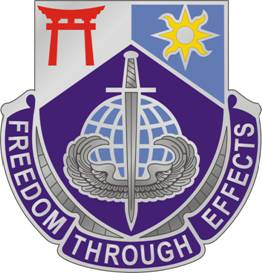
- Distinctive unit insignia
- Active: March 16, 2007 – Present
- Country: United States
- Branch: United States Army
- Type: Civil Affairs
- Role: Supporting military commanders by working with civil authorities and civilian populations in the commander’s area of operations during peace and war
- Size: Battalion
- Part of: 95th Civil Affairs Brigade
- Garrison/HQ: Fort Bragg, North Carolina
- Motto: "Into The Fire" "In Incendia"

Commanders
- Current commander: LTC Michael Swanger
- Current Command Sergeant Major: CSM Analisa M. Ortega

Insignia
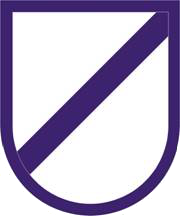
- Beret flash

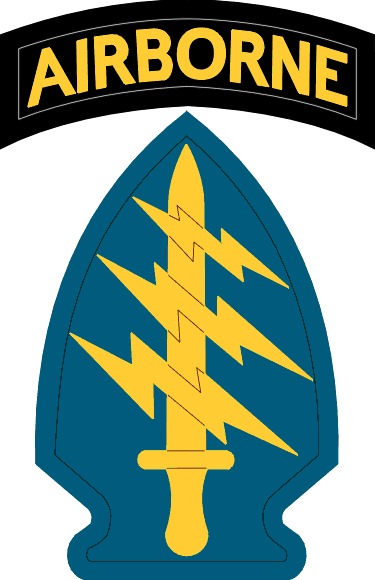
- 1st Special Forces Command (Airborne) shoulder sleeve insignia, worn by all subordinate units

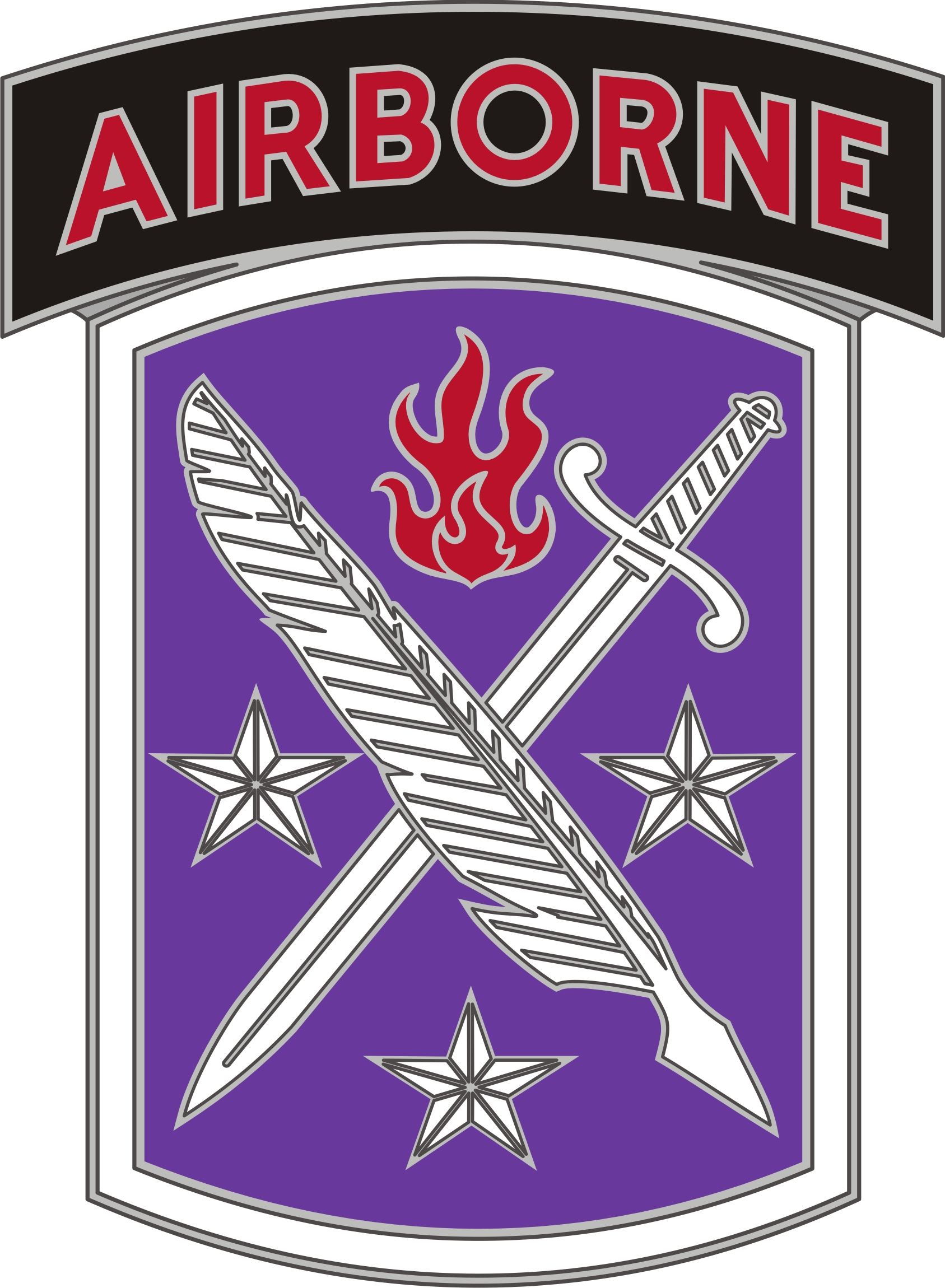
- Former combat service identification badge of the 95th Civil Affairs Brigade (Special Operations) (Airborne)

The 97th Civil Affairs Battalion (Special Operations) (Airborne) is a civil affairs battalion of the 95th Civil Affairs Brigade (Airborne) based at Fort Bragg, North Carolina. It is a member of the only active duty Special Operations Civil Affairs unit in the United States Department of Defense. The concept for a Civil Affairs brigade had been under consideration for years, but was finally approved as a result of the 2006 Quadrennial Defense Review.

Tracing its lineage to a military government group that was active after World War II, the 95th Civil Affairs Brigade (Airborne) was not officially activated until 2006, and remained a provisional unit until 2007. Its creation was part of a US Army plan to increase Civil Affairs units, and Special Forces units overall. The brigade is a direct reporting unit of the 1st Special Forces Command (Airborne), and as such, is airborne qualified. The 95th CA BDE (SO) (A) commands five geographically aligned civil affairs battalions: 91st, 92nd, 96th, 97th, and the 98th, geographically aligned to Global Combatant Commands (GCC) - AFRICOM, EUCOM, CENTCOM, INDOPACOM, and SOUTHCOM, respectively and under the operational control of the Theater Special Operations Commands (TSOC) - SOCAFRICA, SOCEUR, SOCCENT, SOCPAC, and SOCSOUTH, respectively.

Today, SOF Civil Affairs operators are specifically trained soldiers who operate in small, autonomous teams among local populations, despite hostile or denied relations with them. Assessed, selected, and taught in foreign languages, culture, and negotiation, SOF CA Soldiers commonly operate in civilian clothes in over 80 different countries worldwide to build ties to formal and informal leadership and accomplish their goal in diplomatically and politically sensitive areas.

== Organization ==
The 97th Civil Affairs Battalion is directly subordinate to the 95th Civil Affairs Brigade Command based at Fort Bragg.

The battalion commands six subordinate companies all headquartered at Fort Bragg along with the battalion Headquarters and Headquarters Company:

The 97th Civil Affairs Battalion (Special Operations) (Airborne) is the only active component Civil Affairs asset available to the United States Indo-Pacific Command (INDOPACOM). Its lineage and structure extend back to the formation of those small groups of uniquely trained and qualified individuals who constituted the Allied Military Government of the Occupied Territory, or AMGOTs.

=== Training Pathway ===
The Civil Affairs Qualification Course (CAQC) is a 48 week course and is constantly improving to meet the needs of military commanders. Civil Affairs Assessment and Selection (CAAS) is a 10-day rigorous selection process and serves as a tool for cadre to only select the best for SOF CA. Currently, the CAQC consists of four phases: CA MOS Training (11 weeks), SOF Skills (10 weeks), CULEX - Operation Sluss-Tiller (3 weeks), and Language Training (24 weeks). For officers, 1LTs and CPTs must first complete the SOF Captain Career Course prior to starting MOS phase. All CA Soldiers are airborne qualified.

Once Soldiers have graduated from the CAQC they receive orders to one of the battalions under the 95th CA BDE (SO) (A) or to the 83rd CA BN (conventional unit that falls under the XVIII Airborne Corps at Fort Bragg, NC). Civil Affairs personnel within the 83rd CA BN are all SOF trained professionals, and are the only conventional active duty CA unit in the Army.

Common individual training pathways for new CA Soldiers will, at a minimum, include Survival, Evasion, Resistance and Escape (SERE-C), advanced negotiations training, advanced driving courses, and medical training (TCCC). Innumerable other training opportunities and courses are available for CA personnel.

=== Civil Affairs Team (CAT) and Civil Military Support Element (CMSE) ===
The CAT is a 4-person element who train for various mission sets under a specific training pathway. The typical CAT is composed of a Team Leader (CPT), Team Sergeant (SFC), Special Operations Combat Medic (SGT), and a Reconnaissance NCO (SGT).

Civil Military Engagement (CME) is U.S. Special Operations Command’s (USSOCOM) contribution, and part of DOD’s strategy, to building partner nation capacity in a preventive, population-centric, and indirect approach to enhance the capability, capacity, and legitimacy of partnered governments.

CME is implemented by Civil-Military Support Element’s (CMSE) planning and activities which seek to build indigenous capabilities in numerous fields across the civil and military sectors. Examples include medicine, public health, civil-military cooperation, education, human rights, humanitarian assistance/disaster response (HA/DR), disaster risk reduction, civic engagement, and post-conflict stabilization, or other training and events requested by partner governments and security forces.

The CMSE is sourced by a Special Operations Force (SOF) Civil Affairs (CA) Team. CMSEs conduct planned and targeted civil reconnaissance and civil engagement within the operational environment in support of Geographic Combatant Command (GCC) campaign plans, the Theater Special Operations Command (TSOC) campaign support plan, and in conjunction with U.S. Embassy strategies and objectives.

== History ==
=== Origins ===
Originally designated as the 97th Headquarters and Headquarters Detachment, Military Government Group, the unit was activated on 25 August 1945 at the Presidio of Monterey, California to help capture Army Civil Affairs expertise gained during World War II. The unit served in various theaters until 25 January 1949, when, while located in Korea, it was inactivated. In November 1961, the unit was re-designated the 97th Civil Affairs Group and allocated to the Regular Army. The formal activation ceremony took place on Okinawa, on the 15 December 1961. The unit was stationed on Okinawa until it was inactivated in June 1969.

The personnel and equipment from the old civil affairs group were used to form the 96th Civil Affairs Battalion. On 16 September 1992, 97th Civil Affairs Group was re-designated as the 97th Civil Affairs Battalion. Through the demonstrated need for specially trained, culturally aware soldiers, the 97th Civil Affairs Battalion was placed in a Provisional status on 1 September 2006 as a part of the growth of Active Army Civil Affairs from 96th Civil Affairs Battalion to the 95th Civil Affairs Brigade and four regionally-oriented battalions.

=== Activation ===
The 97th Civil Affairs Battalion (Airborne) was activated on March 16, 2007. Called upon to support both conventional and special operations units, the battalion has a tradition of maintaining a high state of readiness and support to a wide range of contingencies. Today, 97th Civil Affairs Battalion personnel operate in countries across the globe.

=== Deployment ===
The 97th Civil Affairs Battalion (Special Operations) (Airborne) has been deployed worldwide in support of Operation Enduring Freedom – Philippines, Operation Pacific Eagle - Philippines, Operation Enduring Freedom – Afghanistan, and Operation Iraqi Freedom and is the only persistently deployed active duty Civil Affairs element within the USINDOPACOM AOR. The battalion has suffered casualties which were rehabilitated through the Wounded Warrior program.
