= 96th Civil Affairs Battalion =

96th Civil Affairs Battalion (Special Operations) (Airborne)
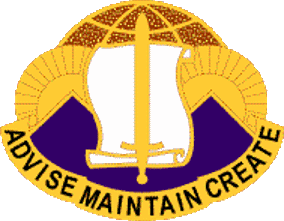
- Distinctive unit insignia
- Active: March 16, 2007 – Present
- Country: United States
- Branch: United States Army
- Type: Civil Affairs
- Role: Supporting military commanders by working with civil authorities and civilian populations in the commander’s area of operations during peace and war
- Size: Battalion
- Part of: 95th Civil Affairs Brigade
- Garrison/HQ: Fort Bragg, North Carolina
- Mottos: Advise, Maintain, Create
- Decorations: Meritorious Unit Commendation (Army) for SOUTHWEST ASIA 1990-1991 Army Superior Unit Award for 1998-1999

Commanders
- Current commander: LTC Tanner Fleck

Insignia
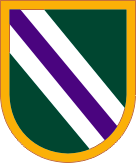
- Beret flash

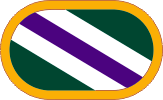
- Background trimming

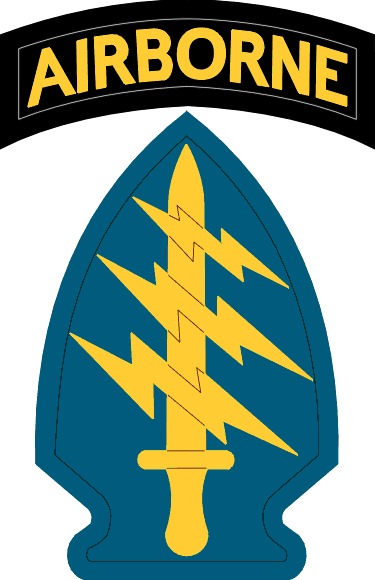
- 1st Special Forces Command (Airborne) shoulder sleeve insignia, worn by all subordinate units

The 96th Civil Affairs Battalion (Special Operations) (Airborne) is a civil affairs battalion of the 95th Civil Affairs Brigade (Airborne) based at Fort Bragg, North Carolina. It is a member of the only Active duty United States special operations forces civil affairs brigade in the United States Department of Defense. The concept for a civil affairs brigade had been under consideration for years, but was finally approved as a result of the 2006 Quadrennial Defense Review.

The Battalion was constituted on 25 August 1945 in the Army of the United States as the 96th Headquarters and Headquarters Detachment, Military Government Group. It was activated on 26 August 1945 at the Presidio of Monterey, California and inactivated on 25 January 1949 in Korea. The Battalion was redesignated on 10 May 1967 as the 96th Civil Affairs Group and allotted to the Regular Army. It was activated once again on 25 August 1967 at Fort Lee, Virginia. It was later reorganized and redesignated on 26 November 1971 as the 96th Civil Affairs Battalion.

The 95th Civil Affairs Brigade was not officially activated until 2006, and remained a provisional unit until 2007 as a part of the growth of Active Army Civil Affairs from 96th Civil Affairs Battalion to the 95th Civil Affairs Brigade and four regionally oriented battalions. Its creation was part of a US Army plan to increase civil affairs units, and special forces units overall. The brigade is a direct reporting unit of the 1st Special Forces Command (Airborne), and as such, is airborne qualified. It commands five geographically aligned civil affairs battalions.

Service Members from the 96th Civil Affairs Battalion (Special Operations)(Airborne) take pride in being known as "The Originals".

== Organization ==
The 96th Civil Affairs Battalion is directly subordinate to the 95th Civil Affairs Brigade Command based at Fort Bragg.

The brigade commands five subordinate Battalions all headquartered at Fort Bragg along with the battalion Headquarters and Headquarters Company:

The 96th Civil Affairs Battalion (Special Operations) (Airborne) is the only active component, airborne Civil Affairs asset available to the United States Central Command. Its lineage and structure extend back to the formation of those small groups of uniquely trained and qualified individuals who comprised the Allied Military Government of the Occupied Territory, or AMGOTs.

== History ==
=== Origins ===
Originally designated as the 96th Headquarters and Headquarters Detachment, Military Government Group, the unit was activated on 25 August 1945 at the Presidio of Monterey, California to help capture Army Civil Affairs expertise gained during World War II. The unit served in various theaters until 25 January 1949, when, while located in Korea, it was inactivated. On 10 May 1967, the unit was re-designated the 96th Civil Affairs Group and allocated to the Regular Army. The formal activation ceremony took place on 25 August 1967 at Fort Lee, Virginia. The unit was reorganized and redesignated on 26 November 1971 as the Civil Affairs Battalion.

=== Deployment ===
The 96th Civil Affairs Battalion (Special Operations) (Airborne) has been deployed worldwide in support of Operation Just Cause – Panama, Operation Desert Storm – Kuwait/Iraq, Operation Provide Comfort – Northern Iraq, Operation Enduring Freedom – Philippines, Operation Enduring Freedom – Afghanistan, Operation Iraqi Freedom, and Operation Inherent Resolve as well as several countries in the CENTCOM AOR. The battalion has suffered fatal casualties and casualties which were rehabilitated through the new Wounded Warrior program.
