= 95th Civil Affairs Brigade =

U.S. Army civil affairs force

95th Civil Affairs Brigade (Special Operations) (Airborne)
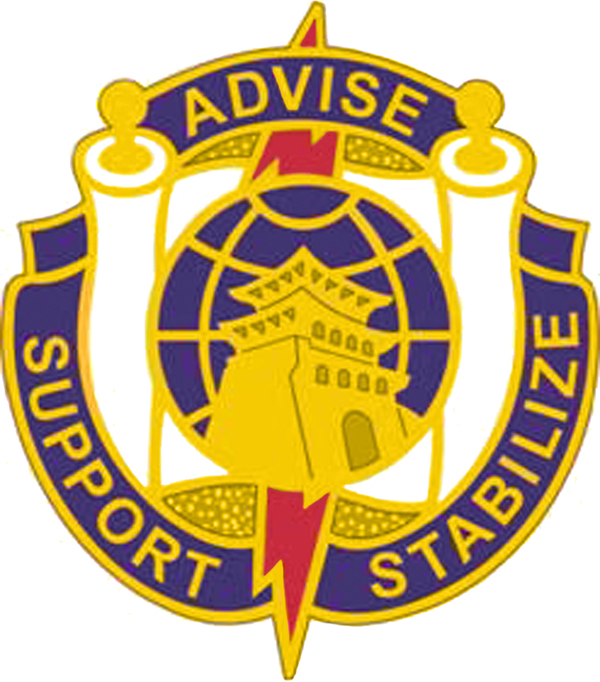
- 95th Civil Affairs Brigade distinctive unit insignia
- Active: 16 March 2006–present
- Country: United States
- Branch: United States Army
- Type: Civil Affairs
- Role: Provide the nation's premier Civil Reconnaissance and Engagement force to understand and influence the human component of the land domain to advance the nation's global priorities.
- Size: Brigade
- Part of: 1st Special Forces Command
- Garrison/HQ: Fort Bragg, North Carolina
- Mottos: "Advise, Support, Stabilize" "Order From Chaos"
- Decorations: Army Superior Unit Award Three Korean War Streamers
- Website: Official Facebook page

Commanders
- Current commander: Colonel David J. Kaczmarek

Insignia
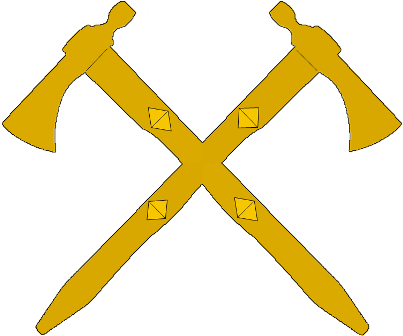
- "Pipehawk" insignia, worn by special operations civil affairs paratroopers

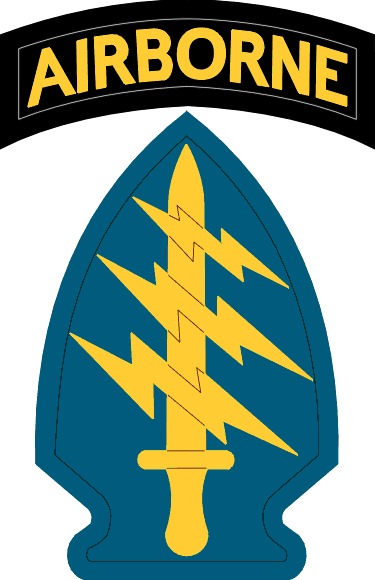
- 1st Special Forces Command (Airborne) shoulder sleeve insignia, worn by all subordinate units

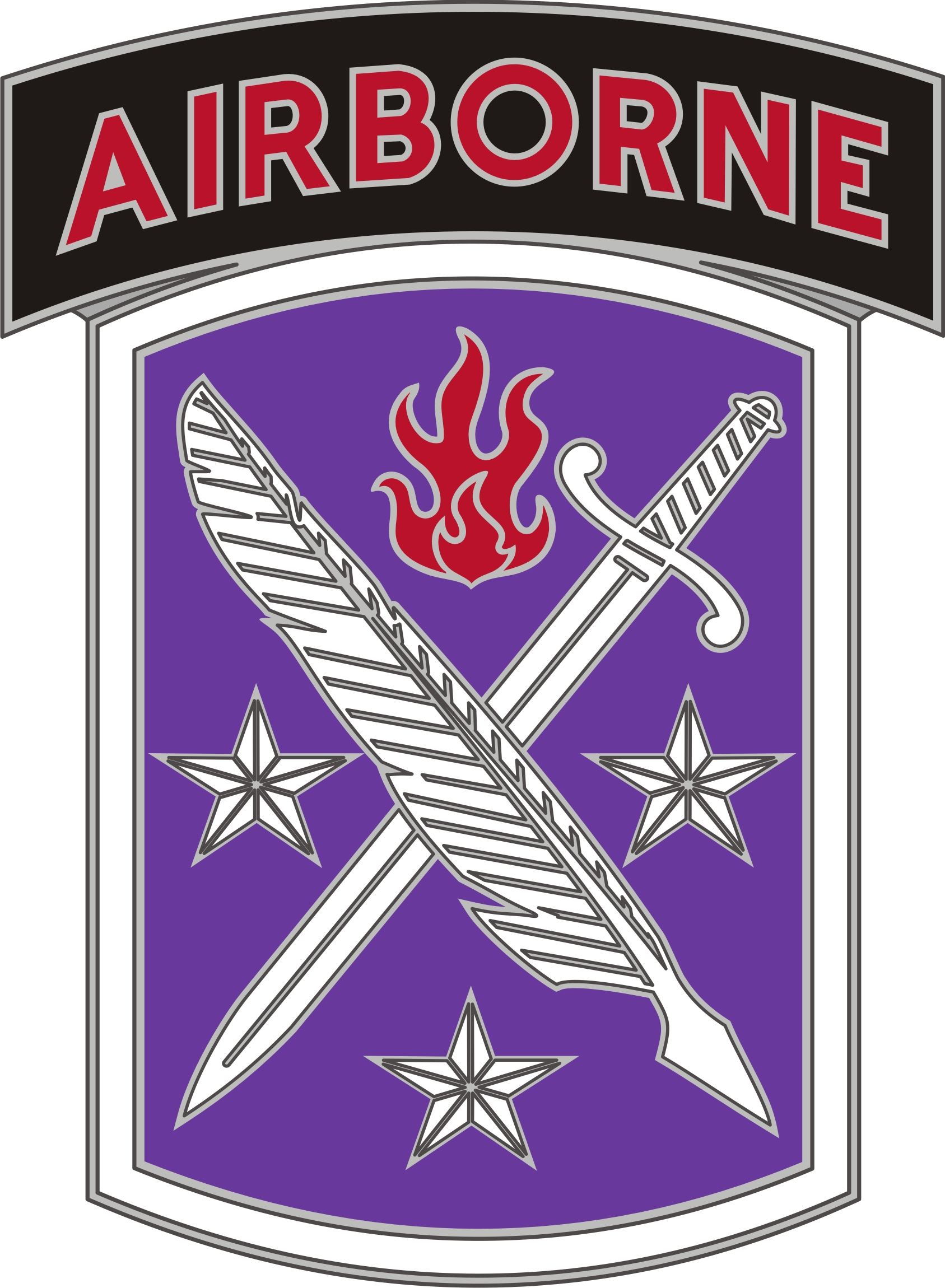
- Former combat service identification badge of the brigade

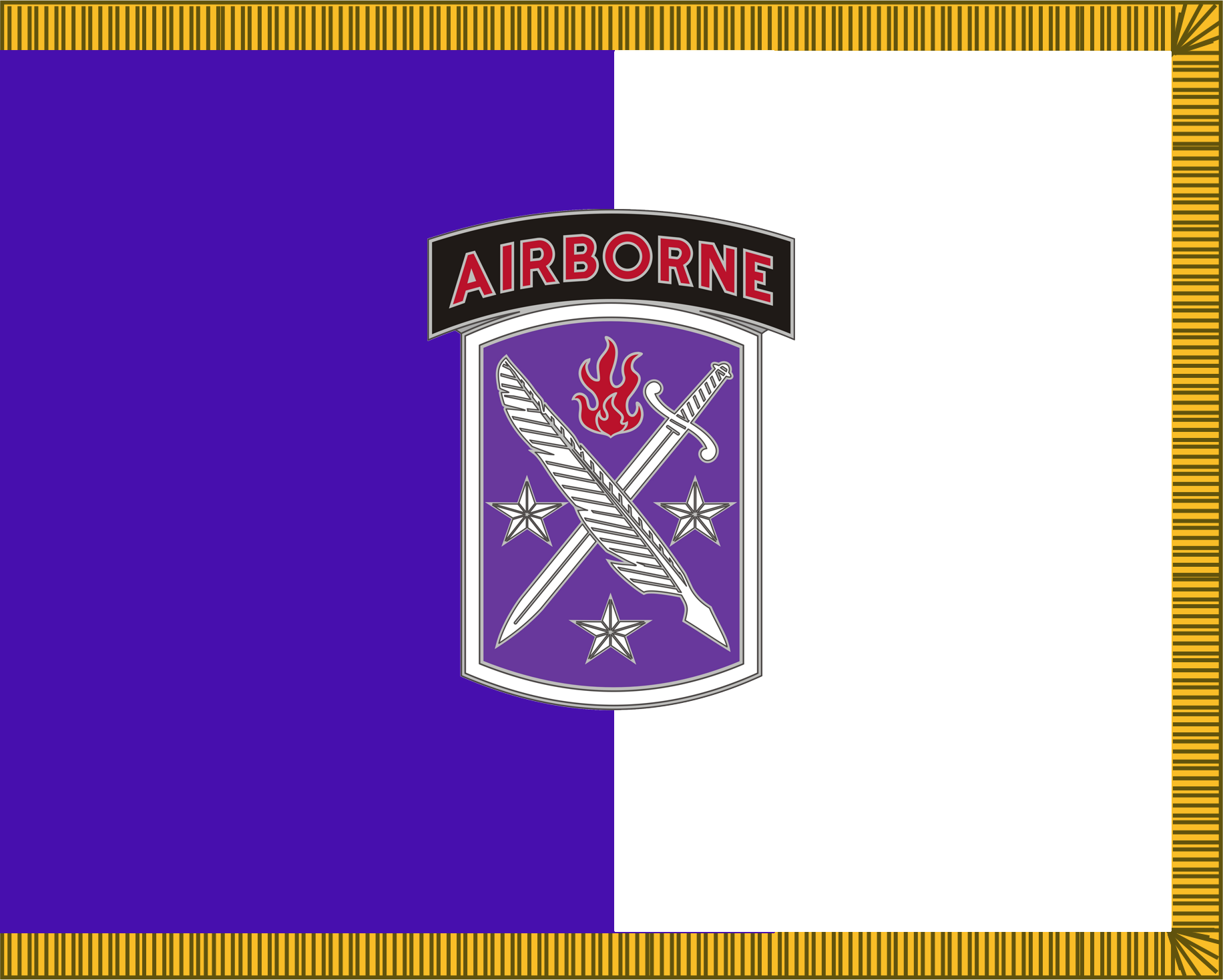
- 95th Civil Affairs Brigade Flag

Why the 95th Civil Affairs (1st Special Forces Command recruiting video) (3:16)

The 95th Civil Affairs Brigade (Special Operations) (Airborne) is a Special Operations Civil Affairs brigade of the United States Army based at Fort Bragg, North Carolina. The concept for a civil affairs brigade had been under consideration for years, but was finally approved as a result of the 2006 Quadrennial Defense Review. The 95th Civil Affairs Brigade makes up a significant portion of the four percent of civil affairs soldiers in the active component.

Tracing its lineage to a military government group that was active after World War II, the 95th Civil Affairs Brigade was not officially activated until 2006, and remained a provisional unit until 2007. Its creation was part of a U.S. Army plan to increase civil affairs units overall.

== Organization ==
The brigade commands five subordinate battalions all headquartered at Fort Bragg along with the brigade's headquarters:

- Brigade Headquarters and Headquarters Company
- 91st Civil Affairs Battalion aligned with United States Africa Command
- 92nd Civil Affairs Battalion aligned with United States European Command
- 96th Civil Affairs Battalion aligned with United States Central Command
- 97th Civil Affairs Battalion aligned with United States Indo-Pacific Command
- 98th Civil Affairs Battalion aligned with United States Southern Command.

== History ==
=== Origins ===
The brigade traces its lineage back to the 95th Military Government Group, activated 25 August 1945. The group was assigned to Japan to provide provisional government duties during the post-World War II occupation of Japan. Following its brief assignment, the group was inactivated on 30 June 1946.

The group was reactivated again just prior to the Korean War, on 29 October 1948 at Fort Bragg, North Carolina. It was dispatched to the Korean peninsula where it remained during three campaigns of the war, First UN Counteroffensive; CCF Offensive, and a third campaign streamer. However, as the war became a long, drawn out stalemate and with no need for the military government group, it was deactivated in Korea on 28 October 1951 in the middle of the war.

The group was again activated on 9 February 1955 at Camp Gordon, Georgia and reorganized into a civil affairs unit. It was formally redesignated the 95th Civil Affairs Group on 25 June 1959. It received a distinctive unit insignia on 27 March 1969. After almost 20 years of active service, the group had seen no deployments to any conflicts or contingencies with the US Army, including never seeing deployment to the Vietnam War. Thus, the group was inactivated on 21 December 1974 at Fort Bragg.

=== Activation ===
The US Department of Defense issued its Quadrennial Defense Review on 6 February 2006. In this report, the department announced that Special Operations Forces would increase in all areas across all branches of the US military. To support this, the department announced that psychological operations and civil affairs units would be increased by 3,700 soldiers to support units throughout the Army. This would include a large increase of the active component civil affairs, which at the time consisted of only the 96th Civil Affairs Battalion, commanding six company sized units assigned to the major regional commands of the US Army. The decision was made to form a brigade-sized civil affairs unit to act as a command element for the only four active duty battalion sized civil affairs units operating for the active duty US Army. This move would allow the brigade to more quickly prepare its subordinate units for rapid deployment in support of Army contingencies to provide tactical support to other Army units. It was decided shortly thereafter that the 95th Civil Affairs Group would be reactivated.

In March 2006, the unit was re-designated as a brigade and Lieutenant General Robert Wagner, the commanding general of the United States Army Special Operations Command authorized it to operate in a provisional status. By May, the brigade had 420 staff, with 20 assigned to its Headquarters and Headquarters Company and the remaining 400 assigned to the 96th CA Battalion.

In March 2007, the 95th was removed from provisional status and fully activated. At the same time the Civil Affairs Branch of the US Army was established.

=== Deployment ===
The brigade headquarters itself has not seen a deployment, even though all subordinate units have been deployed for several support missions. The 96th CA Battalion deployed units in support of the Iraq War in mid-2007. The brigade also had troops deployed in support of special operations units in Operation Enduring Freedom, Afghanistan. The brigade suffered several casualties in Iraq, including two soldiers killed by improvised explosive devices. One of these soldiers, a Major, prompted the State of California to fly its flags at half staff. It also suffered several casualties which were rehabilitated through the new Wounded Warrior Project. The 98th Civil Affairs Battalion also had soldiers deployed to Iraq before its activation in 2008. Soldiers of this battalion also saw deployments to Africa as well as other areas in support of the global war on terrorism.

== Honors ==
=== Unit decorations ===
United States Army Superior Unit Award.

=== Campaign streamers ===
Korean War
First UN Counteroffensive	1950
CCF Spring Offensive	1951
UN Summer-Fall Offensive	1951
