= 389th Military Intelligence Battalion =

US Army special forces support unit

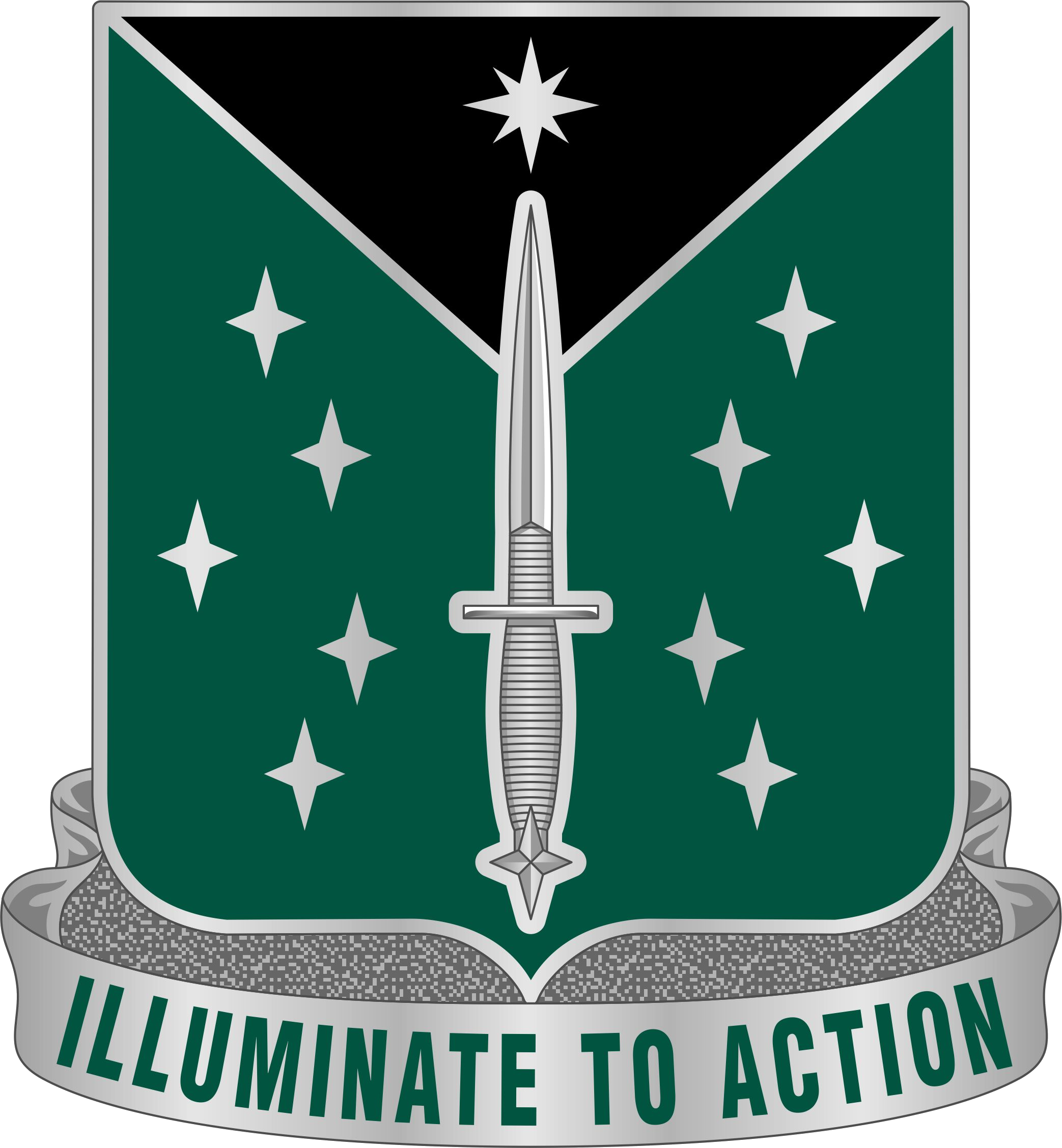
- The battalion's distinctive unit insignia
- Active: 2019 – present
- Country: United States
- Branch: United States Army
- Type: Military intelligence
- Role: Operational intelligence
- Size: Battalion
- Part of: 528th Sustainment Brigade, 1st Special Forces Command
- Headquarters: Fort Bragg, North Carolina, United States
- Nickname: "Daggers"
- Mottos: De Consilio Ductus (From Wisdom, Decisive Action)

Commanders
- Current commander: LTC Matthew Utley

Insignia
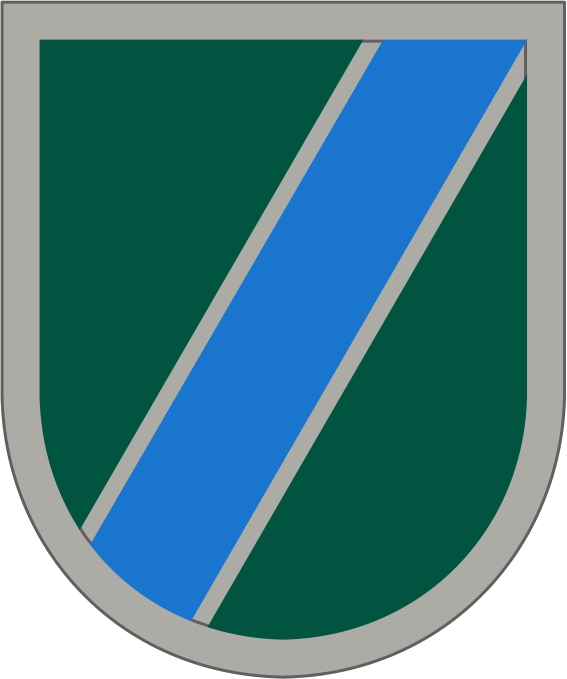
- 389th Military Intelligence Battalion Beret Flash

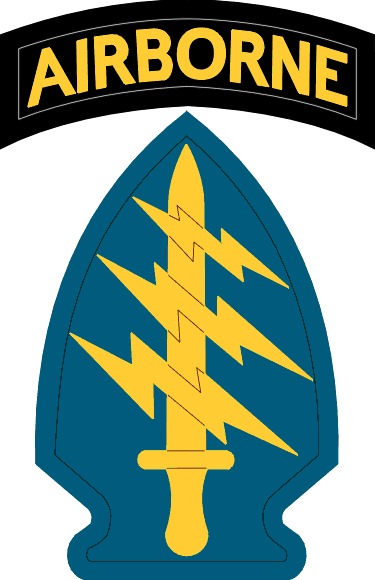
- 1st Special Forces Command (Airborne) Shoulder Sleeve Insignia worn by the battalion

- Map symbol (MIL-STD-2525D)

The 389th Military Intelligence Battalion (Special Operations) (Airborne) is the United States Army's intelligence support battalion to 1st Special Forces Command. It is headquartered at Fort Bragg, North Carolina. It was originally known as the 1st Special Forces Command Military Intelligence Battalion.

== Mission ==
The 389th Military Intelligence Battalion (SO) (A) "conducts command and control of multi-disciplined intelligence operations in support of the 1st Special Forces Command, component subordinate units, and mission partners." On order, it deploys and conducts intelligence operations as part of a special operations joint task force leveraging the capabilities of its three organic companies: a headquarters company; an Analytical Support Company with a cryptologic support element and five geographically aligned regional support teams; a Mission Support Company with a Processing, Exploitation, and Dissemination (PED) detachment, a HUMINT and GEOINT detachment, and operations the Special Warfare SIGINT Course for the Army Special Operations community; and an additional PED detachment stationed at Fort Gordon.

== History ==
Constituted 14 December 1944 in the Army of the United States as the 389th Translator Team then deactivated on January 9, 1945 at Fort Worth and reactivated February 27, 1945 in the Philippines. It was later inactivated March 25, 1947 in Korea. In May 1948, the unit was moved to the Organized Reserves Corps and reactivated May 21, 1948 at Fort Worth, Texas. The unit was then redesignated September 6, 1950 as the 389th Translator Detachment and moved on October 2, 1950 at Cincinnati, Ohio. The unit changed location again on February 5, 1951 to Fort Thomas, Kentucky then inactivated July 20, 1952. The unit was redesignated November 5, 1962 as the 389th Military Intelligence Detachment and reactivated January 7, 1963 at Louisville, Kentucky where it was eventually reorganized and redesignated March 16, 1985 as the 389th Military Intelligence Company, eventually being inactivated September 15, 1990. Redesignated June 1-, 2018 as the 389th Military Intelligence Battalion and activated July 16, 2019 at Fort Bragg, North Carolina.

=== Unit campaigns ===
- World War II
  - Leyte
  - Ryukyus

=== Unit decorations ===
- Presidential Unit Citation, Streamer embroidered with "OKINAWA"

== List of Commanders ==
No.	Commander		Term		
No.	Portrait	Name	Took office	Left office	Term length
-	Richard A. Malaga	Lieutenant Colonel; Richard A. Malaga; Acting	July 2015	August 2018	3 years, 58 days
1	Sapriya Childs	Lieutenant Colonel; Sapriya Childs	August 2018	June 2021	2 years, 277 days
2	Matthew Utley	Lieutenant Colonel; Matthew Utley	July 2021	Incumbent	5 years, 75 days
