= 98th Civil Affairs Battalion =

98th Civil Affairs Battalion (Airborne)
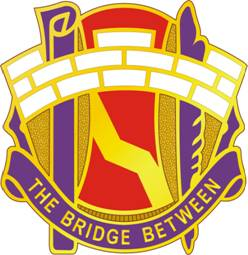
- Distinctive unit insignia
- Active: 16 March 2008 – Present
- Country: United States
- Branch: United States Army
- Type: Civil Affairs
- Role: Supporting military commanders by working with civil authorities and civilian populations in the commander’s area of operations during peace and war
- Size: Battalion
- Part of: 95th Civil Affairs Brigade
- Garrison/HQ: Fort Bragg, North Carolina
- Motto: THE BRIDGE BETWEEN

Insignia
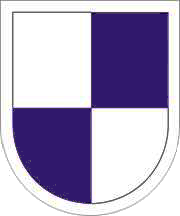
- Beret flash

The 98th Civil Affairs Battalion (Airborne) is a civil affairs battalion of the 95th Civil Affairs Brigade (Airborne), based at Fort Bragg, North Carolina, and part of the 1st Special Forces Command (Airborne). The battalion was activated on 16 March 2008 at Fort Bragg and was assigned to the 95th Civil Affairs Brigade. As of March 2008, soldiers of the 98th Civil Affairs Battalion were participating in Operation Iraqi Freedom and other operations in Africa. Other 98th Civil Affairs Battalion soldiers were expected to deploy overseas later in 2008.

== History ==
The 98th Civil Affairs Battalion was constituted on 25 August 1945 in the Army of the United States as the 98th Headquarters and Headquarters Detachment, Military Government Group and activated the next day at the Presidio of Monterey, California. The unit was deployed to Korea to assist with its occupation at the end of World War II and was officially inactivated on 25 January 1949 in Korea.

The unit was consolidated on 31 December 1989 with Headquarters and Headquarters Detachment, 3rd Civil Affairs Group. 3rd Civil Affairs Group had been first constituted on 1 December 1967 in the Regular Army as Headquarters and Headquarters Detachment, 3rd Civil Affairs Group and activated on 1 October 1968 in the Panama Canal zone. It was inactivated there on 31 December 1974. The consolidated unit was re-designated as the 98th Civil Affairs Group and concurrently allotted to the Regular Army. Still inactive, the unit was renamed on 16 September 1992 as the 98th Civil Affairs Battalion.

The unit is currently focused to support operations within the United States Southern Command (SOUTHCOM) area of responsibility.
