= 112th Special Operations Signal Battalion =

112th Signal Battalion (Special Operations) (Airborne)
- 112th Signal Battalion coat of arms
- Active: 1944–1945; 1986–present
- Country: United States
- Allegiance: Regular Army
- Branch: U.S. Army
- Type: Special Operations Support
- Role: Communications
- Size: Battalion
- Part of: 528th Sustainment Brigade
- Garrison/HQ: Fort Bragg, North Carolina
- Mottos: PENETRA LE TENEBRE (Penetrate the Shadows)
- Engagements: World War II; Gulf War; War on terrorism
- Decorations: Meritorious Unit Citation (3); Army Superior Unit Award (2)

Insignia
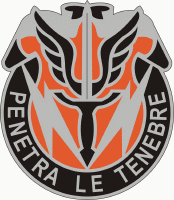
- Distinctive unit insignia

- Beret flash

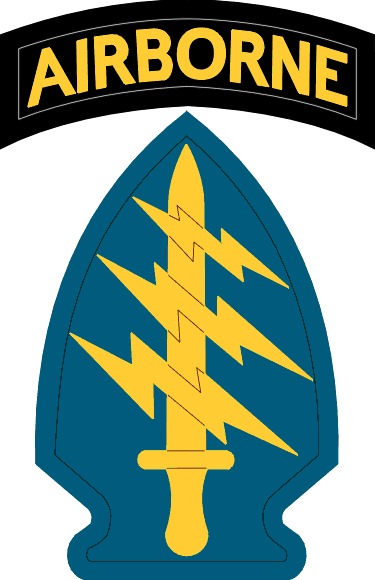
- 1st Special Forces Command (Airborne) shoulder sleeve insignia, worn by all subordinate units

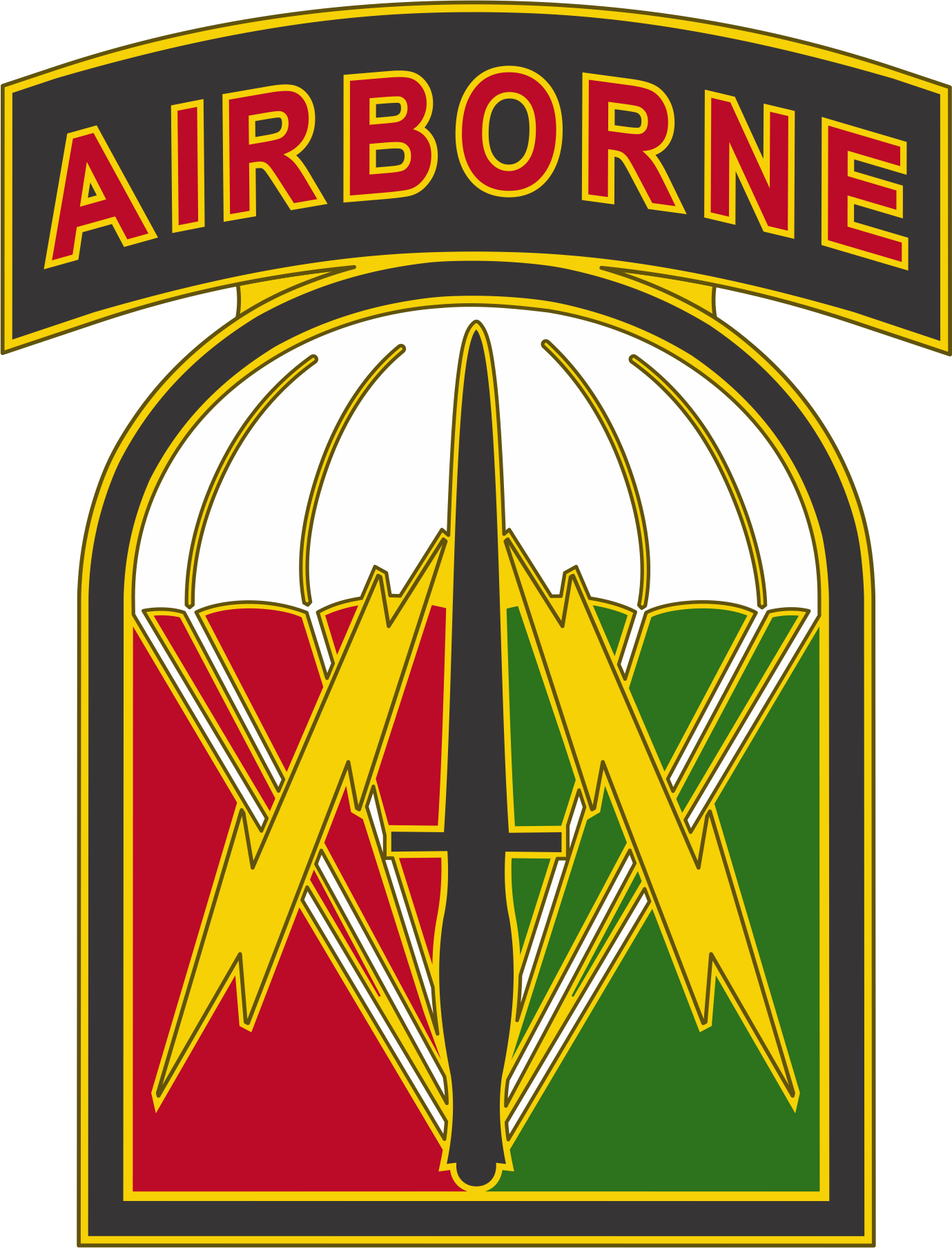
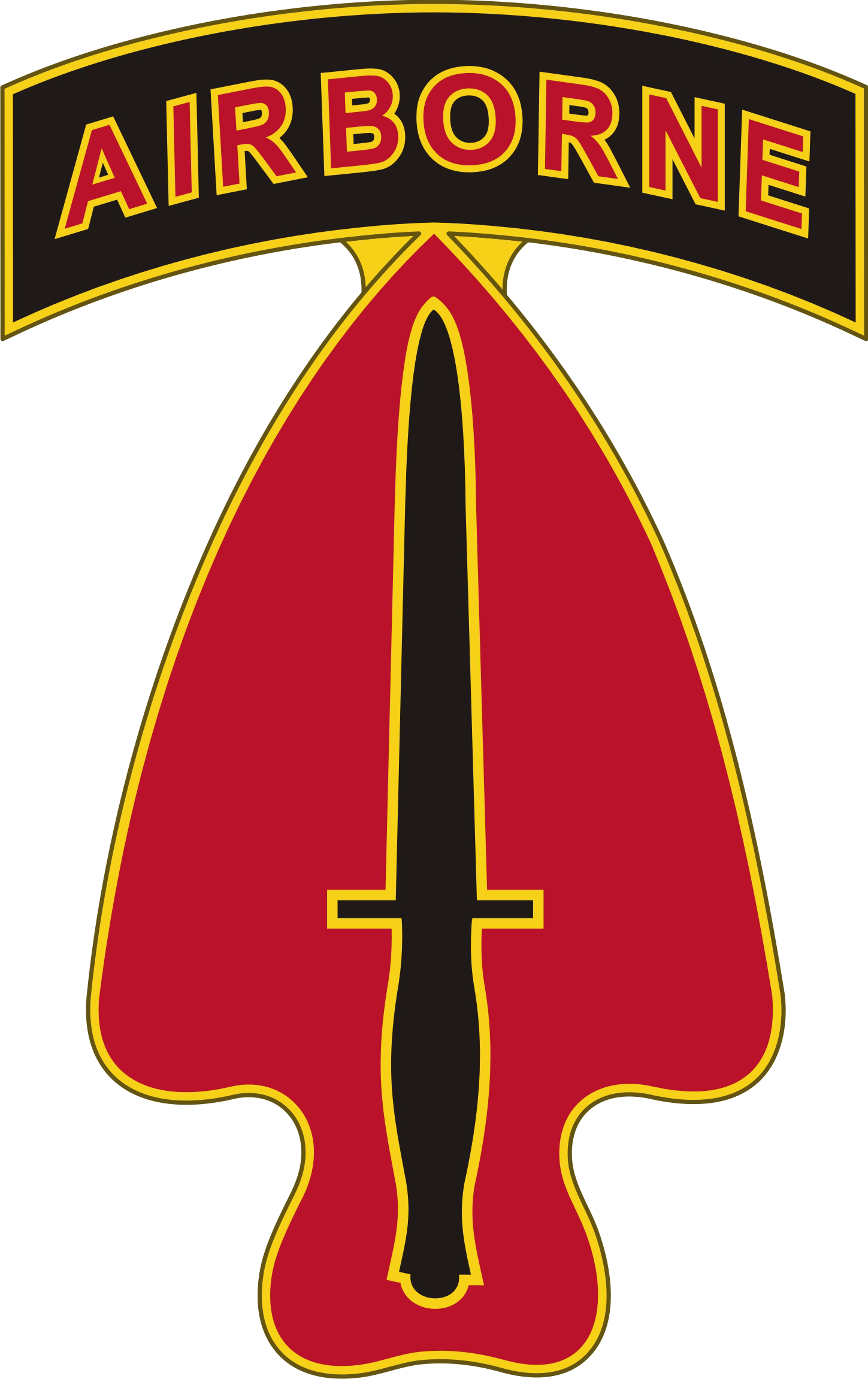
- Former combat service identification badges

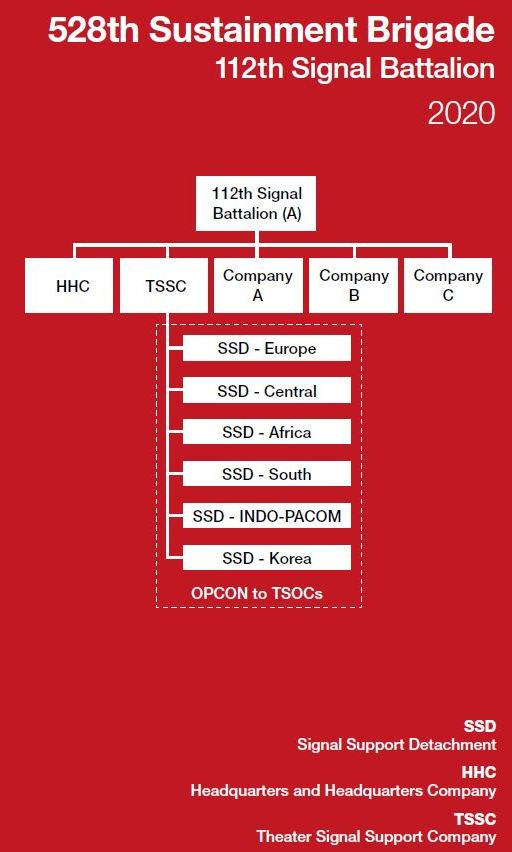

The 112th Special Operations Signal Battalion (Airborne) is part of the 528th Sustainment Brigade (Special Operations) (Airborne) and specializes in supporting United States Army Special Operations Command (USASOC) forces.

== History ==
The 112th Signal Battalion (Special Operations)(Airborne) has a long history of signal operations in support of Airborne and Special Operations Forces.

The heritage of the 112th Signal Battalion began with the activation of the 512th Airborne Signal Company on the 14 July 1944, in Lido di Roma, Italy. The 512th conducted signal operations in support of the 1st Special Service Force and the three Parachute Infantry Battalions that comprised the 1st Airborne Task Force. The company, commanded by CPT Charles L. Howard, consisted of 3 officers, 2 warrant officers, and 129 enlisted soldiers. Soldiers for the unit were selected from the 6766th Signal Service Company (Provisional), 82nd Airborne Division and 101st Airborne Division.

As part of the 1st Airborne Task Force, the 512th participated in operations from Rome to Arno Italy. The battalion motto: "Penetra Le Tenebre" ("Penetrate the Shadows") and Mediterranean-style dagger on the battalion Coat of Arms are drawn from this early service in Italy. These early operations in Italy would forever link the unit to Airborne and Special Operations Forces. Over the next half century, this bond would strengthen.

The 512th soldiers, then commanded by 1LT George R. Hartley, conducted signal operations in support of Brigadier General Robert T. Frederick's 1st Airborne Task Force during Operation Dragoon (15 August 1944) at Le Muy, France. They made the unit's first parachute and glider assaults into battle. Thus, earning an "arrowhead" for the unit battle streamer. The 1st Airborne Task Force blocked German counterattacks in support of an Allied landing near Cannes, France. It was an operation that tested the concept of daylight mass tactical parachute drops supporting the deep battle and deep battle communications.

== World War II ==
On 18 December 1944, the 512th Airborne Signal Company was ordered to Ascot, England, to become part of the 1st Allied Airborne Army, thus, establishing a link between the unit and Combined Airborne Forces. Prior to this period, soldiers of the 512th served briefly under the U.S. XVIII Airborne Corps, now symbolized by the "dragon's head" on the Battalion Colors and Coat of Arms.

It was the communications shortfalls experienced by the airborne infantry forces during Operation Market Garden that gave rise to the need for more long-haul communications and a new signal battalion to provide it. Thus, the 112th Airborne Army Signal Battalion was constituted.

The 112th Airborne Army Signal Battalion was constituted on 15 January 1945, and formally activated on 10 February 1945. The 112th was assigned to the 1st Allied Airborne Army. The 512th Airborne Signal Company was used to form the nucleus of the new battalion which was now commanded by LTC George R. Hartley. It initially consisted of 24 officers, 1 warrant officer and 381 enlisted soldiers. The battalion took on the Joint and Combined mission of providing communications for the U.S. and British Airborne, Glider and Air Corps forces in Europe.

On 25 March 1945, 112th soldiers parachuted into battle with nearly 10,000 airborne troops of the Allied Airborne Army in support of Operation Varsity "Jump Across the Rhine." Again 112th soldiers provided critical combat communications deep within enemy lines. By 7 May, 112th soldiers had traveled deep into Germany with the Airborne Army to link up with Russian Forces at the town of Hagenow, near the Baltic Sea. Following the link up with the Russians, the 112th served with occupation forces in Berlin. The rendering of the "Brandenberg Gate" on the Battalion Colors and Coat of Arms represents this service in Berlin.

On 3 December 1945, the 112th Airborne Army Signal Battalion departed from Le Havre, France, on the S.S. US Victory, bound for Hampton Roads, Virginia, in the United States. There at Camp Patrick Henry, Virginia, on 12 December 1945, the unit was deactivated.

== 1985-present ==
=== Activation, deployment to Panama ===
When the Theater Special Operations Commands needed deployable communications the 112th returned to the active force. On 17 September 1986 the battalion was designated as the 112th Special Operations Signal Battalion (Airborne), allotted to the Regular Army and activated at Fort Bragg, North Carolina. LTC James D. (Dave) Bryan, who had worked to develop the organization and operational concept for the unit, became the first commander of the 112th since World War II. And, CSM Billie F. Phipps was selected as the first Sergeant Major for the re-activated unit. The battalion was assigned to the newly activated 1st Special Operations Command. At the activation ceremony, the battalion received orders for deployment supporting Operation Hat Trick in support of Special Operations Command South in Panama and has maintained a continuous presence in overseas Theaters ever since. Hence, the families of the 112th would begin a tradition of mutual support to sustain the long months of separation while their loved ones faithfully served their nation in support of Special Operations Forces. During this early period 112th provided communications in support of several US security efforts and Drug Enforcement Administration operations in the Southern Region.

=== Panama ===
In 1989 the United States chose to exercise its treaty rights in Panama through the deployment of US Forces with less than 12 hours' notice. This practice was put to good use during Operation Just Cause. On Christmas Eve 1989, a company of 112th soldiers were among the first to deploy to Panama in support of the Joint Special Operations Headquarters. 112th soldiers, now under the command of LTC Steven R. (Steve) Sawdey and CSM Louis (Lou) Black, became the first soldiers of the 112th to see combat since World War II. They provided vital communications links between the Joint Special Operations Headquarters and deployed Special Operations Forces. After the victory of Operation Just Cause, soldiers of the 112th continued to provide communications during Operation Promote Liberty as US Forces assisted the Panamanian people work toward democracy.

Upon returning to Fort Bragg, the battalion fielded new and improved communications systems. Long-range, high-frequency, multi-channel systems were added to the battalion. Other systems were downsized to increase transportability, which made the 112th one of the most deployable signal units in the world.

On 27 November 1990, the United States Army Special Forces Command was activated at Fort Bragg, North Carolina, replacing the 1st Special Operations Command. The United States Army Special Forces Command became the headquarters for all Army Special Forces units, active and reserve and the 112th Special Operations Signal Battalion (Airborne).

=== Saudi Arabia ===
On 5 February 1991, the battalion (-), under the command of LTC Samuel (Sam) Higdon and CSM Raymond Clark, deployed to Saudi Arabia on Operation Desert Shield. The unit went on to Operation Desert Storm in Iraq. It added a seventh battle streamer to the unit colors and earned a Unit Commendation. In South West Asia, the unit provided vital command and control connectivity to two Special Forces Groups, CENTCOM, XVIII Airborne Corps and Department of Defense elements. After the victory in Iraq, the battalion returned to Fort Bragg on 31 March; however, teams were left behind in support of Operation Provide Comfort in southern Turkey and Northern Iraq.

=== Southern United States ===
On 26 August 1992, Hurricane Andrew stuck the Southern Coast of the United States, causing the single worst natural disaster in U.S. history. With 24 hours' notice, the battalion, now commanded by LTC Donald (Don) Kropp and CSM Ronnie (Beaver) McCan launched soldiers to provide communications for Special Forces Detachments conducting disaster relief. Again, 112th soldiers were called upon to play a significant role in disaster assistance and performed superbly. Later that same year, in October, the 112th Signal Battalion (Airborne) was reassigned from United States Army Special Forces Command to the United States Army Special Operations Command. The change in command line more clearly defined the role of the battalion to provide communications in support of Joint Special Operations Task Force Commanders and Army Special Operations Task Force Commanders.

On 27 February 1993, a team of 112th soldiers was deployed to Europe in support of Provide Promise/Deny Flight, to provide humanitarian assistance and enforcement of the no-fly zone over for former Yugoslavia. Operations in Europe gave rise to a proposal to migrate the existing SOCEUR Signal Detachment to the 112th and create forward based Theater Special Operations Signal Detachments at each Theater SOC as forward deployed elements of the 112th SO Sig Bn. This marked a formal recognition the 112th worldwide mission to support Special Operations forces in every theater of operations.

=== Haiti ===
It was in October 1993 when a 112th communications team deployed to Haiti as part of the Task Force approved under the "Governors Island Agreement" to pave the way for free elections. During the ensuing USS Harlan County incident that 112th team provided the only reliable communications out of Haiti for US Special Operations Forces. A year later the 112th would return to Haiti.

=== Turkey and Rwanda ===
On 16 July 1994, the 112th, now under the command of LTC Colonel William E. (Bronco) Lane and CSM Paul J. Shedlock, deployed a team to Turkey in support of Provide Comfort II, enforcement of the no-fly zone over northern Iraq. The following week, the 112th Signal Battalion received a movement order to deploy to Rwanda for humanitarian assistance.

=== Guantanamo, Cuba ===
On 12 September 1994, almost immediately after standing down from the Rwanda mission, the battalion (-) deployed to Guantanamo, Cuba to support the Forward Staging Base for Special Operations Forces for Operations Restore Hope/Uphold Democracy in Haiti. On 19 September 1994, 112th soldiers were among the first soldiers into Port-au-Prince, entering in Special Operations MH-60 Pavehawk helicopters, providing critical communications to Brigadier General Richard Potter, the Army Special Operations Task Force Commander. Immediately upon arrival, the 112th established signal operations at the Army Special Operations Task Force Headquarters and launched signal force packages to remote areas in support of Special Forces Forward Operating Bases. The 112th Signal Battalion conducted signal operations in support of the Special Operations Forces conducting peace-keeping, humanitarian assistance and nation building operations until January 1995, when the battalion redeployed leaving a Signal Company Task Force to support the remaining Special Operations Forces until March 1995.

=== Ecuador and Peru ===
On 14 April 1995, the battalion deployed soldiers to Ecuador and Peru in support of the Military Observer Mission Ecuador/Peru (MOMEP). Once again, the quick response time and ability to go anywhere and successfully communicate made the 112th the unit of choice.

=== Italy ===
On 31 August 1995, the battalion was awarded the Army Superior Unit Award, Embroidered 1994–1995, for meritorious performance of difficult and challenging missions. On 12 November 1995 the battalion deployed soldiers to Italy in support of the Operation Able Sentry, peacekeeping mission. They were redeployed to Fort Bragg after successful completion of their mission on 28 February 1996.

On 16 November 1995, the battalion began to field five forward-deployed signal detachments authorized to provide a crashout communications capability to the overseas theater Special Operations Commands. The 112th Signal Detachments were designated 112th Signal Detachment-Europe, 112th Signal Detachment-South, 112th Signal Detachment-Pacific, 112th Signal Detachment-Central and 112th Signal Detachment-Korea.

=== Bosnia ===
On 10 December 1995, the 112th Signal Battalion (-) was the first unit from the continental United States to deploy in support of Operation Joint Endeavor in Bosnia. The battalion deployed into an intermediate staging base in San Vito, Italy and immediately established communications for the Special Operations Command Implementation Force Commander. In sequential operations, 112th Signal Force Packages were rapidly infiltrated into Bosnia and Croatia. The 112th Signal Battalion (-) conducted signal operations in support of Special Operations Forces conducting peacekeeping throughout the area of operations, until April 1996, when Special Operations Forces were realigned and the battalion redeployed leaving a Signal Company Task Force to support the remaining Special Operations Forces. During April, a 112th Signal package from the battalion (-) deployed to Sierra Leone, Africa in support of Operation Assured Response, the Non-Combatant Evacuation of American Citizens from Liberia. The Signal soldiers provided crucial communications until relieved by an Air Force Combat Communications Element later that month.

From 1996 through 1998, the 112th Signal Battalion, now commanded by LTC Howard I (Howie) Cohen and CSM David M. Dalton, continued in its tradition of excellence. The 112th received the second award of the Army Superior Unit Award, embroidered "1995–1996", in June 1997 for its actions in Operation Joint Endeavor in Bosnia, Germany, and Italy and Operation Assured Response in Sierra Leone. In April and May 1998, the 112th provided flawless command and control communications for forces in Senegal and Ghana in support of the African Crisis Response Initiative. The forward deployed 112th Signal Detachments, activated in late 1995, provided short response, crashout communications to the Theater Special Operations Commands (SOC) for various contingency operations and exercises in their respective areas of responsibility. The 112th Signal Detachment–South provided communications support during the Venezuelan Kidnapping Recovery Mission in early 1997, the Japanese Embassy Hostage Situation in Peru in December 1997, and a Costa Rican Search and Rescue Mission in 1998. The 112th Signal Detachment–Pacific provided communications support during Operation Bevel Edge, a non-combatant evacuation operation (NEO) in Thailand and Cambodia in July 1997 and Operation Bevel Incline, a NEO in Indonesia in May 1998. The 112th Signal Detachment–Korea provided support during the North Korean Submarine search mission. Coincidentally, a former Commander of the 112th (COL Don Kropp) exercised overall supervision of the operation in his, then, position as the UNC Chief of Armistice Affairs.

During the next two years, under the command of LTC Michael J. Flynn and Command Sergeants Major Arthur C. (A.C.) Coley and Michael T. McIntyre the 112th Signal Battalion significantly enhanced the services they provide to supported commands.

These enhancements included deployable battlefield VTC, tactical automation (SIPRNET/NIPRNET), Special Operations Force Intelligence Vehicle interface, Deployable SCAMPI, tri-band multichannel, and improved throughput in the tactical multichannel systems. In April 1998, the 112th Signal Battalion, along with the 35th Signal Brigade, performed the operational test and evaluation of the Lightweight High Gain X-band Antenna, the Army's replacement for the Quick Reaction Satellite Antenna.

In 1999, the 112th Signal Battalion deployed elements to Sarajevo, Bosnia-Herzegovina, in support of the Combined Joint Special Operations Task Force (CJSOTF), Special Operations Command Europe, Headquarters United States European Command, during Operation Joint Forge.

=== Afghanistan ===
The events of September 11, 2001, would provide the most significant test of the 112th in its long history. Realizing the significance of the September 11th terrorist attacks, the leadership of 112th Signal Battalion, commanded by LTC Robert Bell and CSM Robert Ervin, stood ready to support impending combat operations. Within 96 hours of the attacks, Alpha Company redeployed from Camp Mackall, NC, where it was conducting its mission assumption "Signal Strike" exercise, and began crisis action planning in support of proposed operations in Afghanistan. A Company deployed to Uzbekistan on October 4, 2001, and established communications for the 5th Special Forces Group within 24 hours of their arrival in theater. On October 7, 2001, in the president's address to the nation, the president announced to the American public that the "United States military had begun strikes against Al Qaeda terrorist training camps and military installations of the Taliban regime in Afghanistan." Since that historic announcement, the 112th Signal Battalion has deployed over 200 soldiers to eight countries on three continents in support of the GWOT. Since that time 112th soldiers continue to support Operation Enduring Freedom in Afghanistan and other locations around the globe.

=== Iraq ===
On Christmas Eve 2002, the 112th Signal Battalion, now commanded by LTC Peter A. (Pete) Gallagher and CSM Leandro Sanfeliz, received deployment orders to Southwest Asia in support of Operation Enduring Freedom. The operation called for SOCCENT to establish a Combined Forces Special Operations Component Command (CFSOCC) as well as two separate JSOTFs, the Joint Special Operations Air Component Command (JSOACC), two Joint Special Operations Air Detachments (JSOAD), a Naval Special Warfare Task Group, and six Special Forces FOBs.

Already engaged in Afghanistan with elements from Alpha Company, the 112th Signal Battalion headquarters, Bravo and Charlie Companies, deployed to the CENTCOM AOR in January 2003. LTC Peter A. (Pete) Gallagher, the battalion commander, deployed with a small battalion tactical operations center (TOC) forward to colocate with the CFSOCC headquarters. The presence of the 112th Signal Battalion (forward) allowed for the overall command and control, and administrative and logistical sustainment of 112th assets in theater, while the 112th-led CFSOCC JCCC orchestrated the communications architecture

Operation Iraqi Freedom represents the largest, most complex and most successful special operations communications network in history.

=== Today ===
Today, over 50 years after the original activation of the 112th Airborne Army Signal Battalion, the 112th Signal Battalion (Special Operations)(Airborne) remains as the only airborne signal battalion and is deemed to be the Army's “premier signal unit”. Its ranks can be found supporting all SOF units under USASOC and even specialized Tier-1 USSOCOM Joint Special Forces Operational theaters across the Middle East, Southeast Asia, Central Africa, West Africa, Europe, South America, and anywhere Special Operations forces routinely operate.

== Campaign honors and awards ==
=== Campaigns ===
| Conflict | Streamer | Year(s) |
|---|---|---|
| World War II | Rome-Arno | 1944 |
| World War II | Southern France with Arrowhead | 1944 |
| World War II | Rhineland | 1944 |
| World War II | Ardennes-Alsace | 1944 |
| World War II | Central Europe | 1945 |
| Gulf War | Liberation and Defense of Kuwait | 1991 |
| Global War On Terrorism | Global War on Terrorism | 2001-Current |

=== Unit Decorations ===
| Award | Year(s) | Note |
|---|---|---|
| Meritorious Unit Commendation | 1991 | Southwest Asia |
| Meritorious Unit Commendation | 2001–2002 | Central Asia |
| Meritorious Unit Commendation | 2002–2003 | Southwest Asia |
| Superior Unit Award | 1994–1995 | |
| Superior Unit Award | 1995–1996 | |
