= Leadership of the United States Special Operations Command =

U.S. Special Operations Command leadership

Seal of the United States Special Operations Command

This is a list of all commanders, deputy commanders, vice commanders, senior enlisted leaders, and chiefs of staff of the United States Special Operations Command. Note that articles in red text are yet to be created.

== Current combatant command staff ==
- Frank M. Bradley, Commander
  - Sean M. Farrell, Deputy Commander
    - Guillaume Beaurpere, Chief of Staff
      - Pedro Rosario, Director, Personnel (J1)
      - James T. Blejski, Jr., Director, Intelligence (J2)
      - Jeromy B. Williams, Director, Operations (J3)
      - Michelle Agplaza, Director, Logistics (J4)
      - John A. Pelleriti, Director, Strategy, Plans and Policy (J5)
      - Peter J. Tragakis, Director, Communications (J6)
      - Shawn R. Satterfield, Director, Joint SOF Force Development and Design (J7) (Provisional) and Deputy Commander for Mobilization and Reserve Affairs
      - Steven M. Marks, Director (J8)
      - Michael G. Dudas, Director, Countering Weapons of Mass Destruction (J10)
  - Steven M. Marks, Vice Commander

== List of leaders of the United States Special Operations Command ==
=== Commanders ===
Commander of the United States Special Operations Command
- Emblem of the United States Special Operations Command

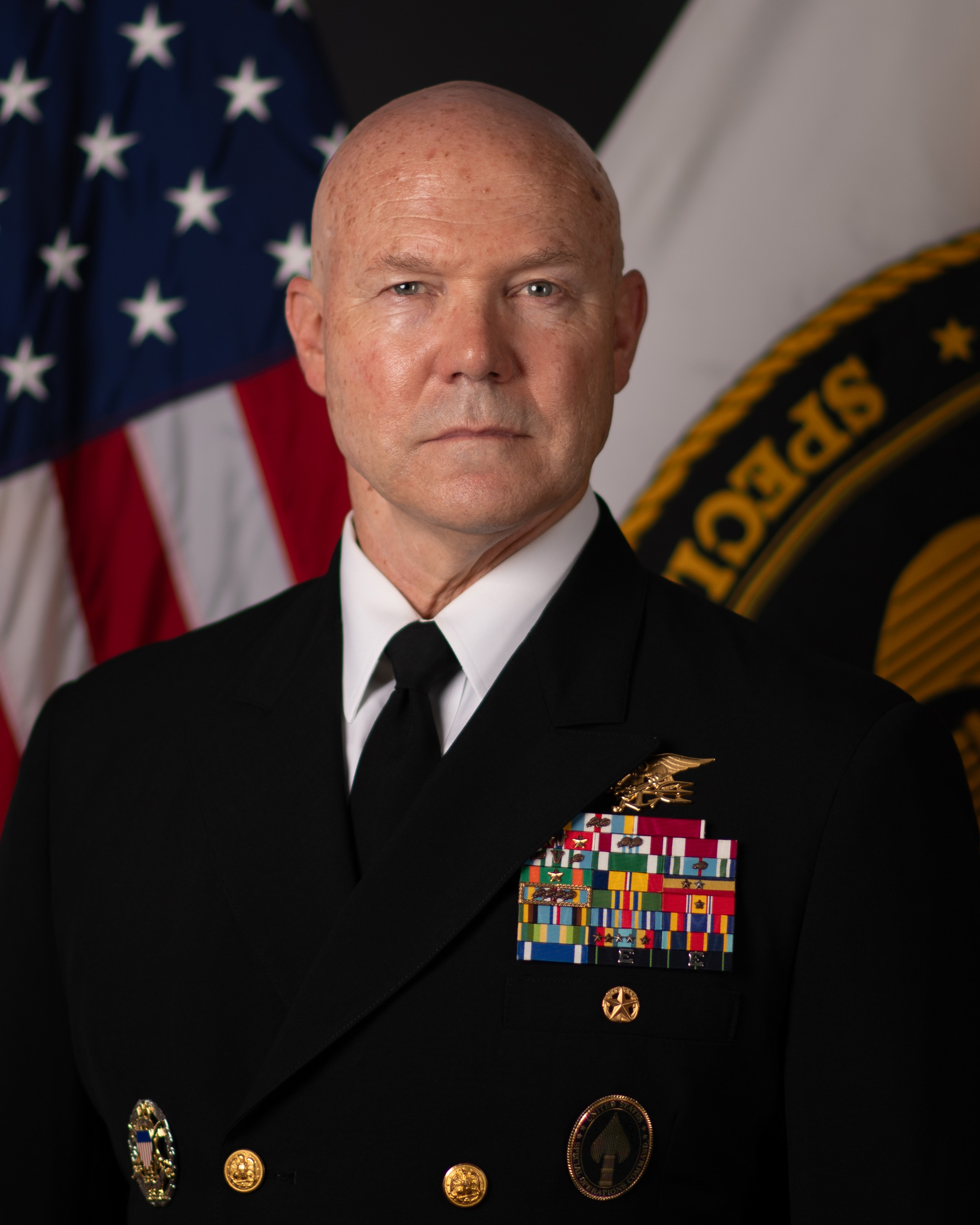
- Incumbent; Admiral Frank M. Bradley, USN since 3 October 2025
- United States Department of Defense
- Type: Unified combatant commander
- Abbreviation: CDRUSSOCOM
- Reports to: President of the United States; Secretary of Defense
- Seat: MacDill Air Force Base, Florida, U.S.
- Nominator: Secretary of Defense
- Appointer: The president with Senate advice and consent
- Term length: 2–3 years (approx.)
- Constituting instrument: 10 U.S.C. § 167
- Formation: 16 April 1987
- First holder: Duane H. Cassidy
- Deputy: Deputy Commander, United States Special Operations Command

No.	Commander		Term			Service branch
No.	Portrait	Name	Took office	Left office	Term length	Service branch
1	James J. Lindsay	General; James J. Lindsay (1932–2023)	16 April 1987	27 June 1990	3 years, 72 days	U.S. Army
2	Carl Stiner	General; Carl Stiner (1936–2022)	27 June 1990	20 May 1993	2 years, 327 days	U.S. Army
3	Wayne A. Downing	General; Wayne A. Downing (1940–2007)	20 May 1993	29 February 1996	2 years, 285 days	U.S. Army
4	Hugh Shelton	General; Hugh Shelton (born 1942)	29 February 1996	25 September 1997	1 year, 209 days	U.S. Army
-	Raymond C. Smith	Rear Admiral; Raymond C. Smith (1943–2022); Acting	25 September 1997	5 November 1997	41 days	U.S. Navy
5	Peter Schoomaker	General; Peter Schoomaker (born 1946)	5 November 1997	27 October 2000	2 years, 357 days	U.S. Army
6	Charles R. Holland	General; Charles R. Holland (born 1948)	27 October 2000	2 September 2003	2 years, 310 days	U.S. Air Force
7	Bryan D. Brown	General; Bryan D. Brown (born 1948)	2 September 2003	9 July 2007	3 years, 310 days	U.S. Army
8	Eric T. Olson	Admiral; Eric T. Olson (born 1952)	9 July 2007	8 August 2011	4 years, 30 days	U.S. Navy
9	William H. McRaven	Admiral; William H. McRaven (born 1955)	8 August 2011	28 August 2014	3 years, 20 days	U.S. Navy
10	Joseph Votel	General; Joseph Votel (born 1958)	28 August 2014	30 March 2016	1 year, 215 days	U.S. Army
11	Raymond A. Thomas	General; Raymond A. Thomas (born 1958)	30 March 2016	29 March 2019	2 years, 364 days	U.S. Army
12	Richard D. Clarke	General; Richard D. Clarke (born 1962)	29 March 2019	30 August 2022	3 years, 154 days	U.S. Army
13	Bryan P. Fenton	General; Bryan P. Fenton (born 1965)	30 August 2022	3 October 2025	3 years, 34 days	U.S. Army
14	Frank M. Bradley	Admiral; Frank M. Bradley	3 October 2025	Incumbent	339 days	U.S. Navy

=== Deputy commanders ===
No.	Deputy Commander		Term			Service branch
No.	Portrait	Name	Took office	Left office	Term length	Service branch
1	Harry A. Goodall	Lieutenant General; Harry A. Goodall	16 April 1987	May 1988	~1 year, 29 days	U.S. Air Force
2	Hugh L. Cox III	Major General; Hugh L. Cox III	May 1988	July 1990	~2 years, 61 days	U.S. Air Force
3	Donald Snyder	Major General; Donald Snyder	July 1990	May 1991	~304 days	U.S. Air Force
4	Thomas E. Eggers	Major General; Thomas E. Eggers	June 1991	July 1993	~2 years, 30 days	U.S. Air Force
5	Irve C. Le Moyne	Rear Admiral; Irve C. Le Moyne (1940–1997)	July 1993	May 1996	~2 years, 305 days	U.S. Navy
6	James C. McCombs	Major General; James C. McCombs	May 1996	1997	~1 year, 46 days	U.S. Air Force
7	Raymond C. Smith	Rear Admiral; Raymond C. Smith (1943–2022)	1997	2001	~4 years, 0 days	U.S. Navy
8	Bryan D. Brown	Lieutenant General; Bryan D. Brown	2002	2003	~1 year, 0 days	U.S. Army
9	Eric T. Olson	Vice Admiral; Eric T. Olson (born 1952)	2003	July 2007	~4 years, 15 days	U.S. Navy
10	Francis H. Kearney III	Lieutenant General; Francis H. Kearney III	July 2007	~April 2010	~2 years, 274 days	U.S. Army
11	David P. Fridovich	Lieutenant General; David P. Fridovich	~April 2010	December 2011	~1 year, 244 days	U.S. Army
12	John F. Mulholland Jr.	Lieutenant General; John F. Mulholland Jr. (born 1955)	August 2012	July 2014	~1 year, 334 days	U.S. Army
13	Sean A. Pybus	Vice Admiral; Sean A. Pybus (born 1957)	July 2014	July 2016	~2 years, 0 days	U.S. Navy
14	Joseph Osterman	Lieutenant General; Joseph Osterman (born 1960)	July 2016	15 October 2018	~2 years, 92 days	U.S. Marine Corps
15	Timothy Szymanski	Vice Admiral; Timothy Szymanski (born 1962)	15 October 2018	16 December 2021	3 years, 62 days	U.S. Navy
16	Collin P. Green	Vice Admiral; Collin P. Green (born 1962)	16 December 2021	20 January 2024	2 years, 35 days	U.S. Navy
17	Sean M. Farrell	Lieutenant General; Sean M. Farrell	27 March 2024	Incumbent	2 years, 164 days	U.S. Air Force

=== Vice commanders ===
No.	Deputy Commander		Term			Service branch
No.	Portrait	Name	Took office	Left office	Term length	Service branch
1	Eric E. Fiel	Lieutenant General; Eric E. Fiel	11 June 2010	19 July 2011	1 year, 38 days	U.S. Air Force
2	Bradley A. Heithold	Lieutenant General; Bradley A. Heithold	19 July 2011	16 June 2014	2 years, 332 days	U.S. Air Force
3	Thomas J. Trask	Lieutenant General; Thomas J. Trask	16 June 2014	2 August 2017	3 years, 47 days	U.S. Air Force
4	Scott A. Howell	Lieutenant General; Scott A. Howell (born 1965)	2 August 2017	29 July 2018	361 days	U.S. Air Force
5	James C. Slife	Lieutenant General; James C. Slife (born 1967)	29 July 2018	June 2019	~321 days	U.S. Air Force
6	Tony D. Bauernfeind	Lieutenant General; Tony D. Bauernfeind	31 June 2020	9 December 2022	2 years, 162 days	U.S. Air Force
7	Francis L. Donovan	Lieutenant General; Francis L. Donovan	~15 December 2022	5 February 2026	~3 years, 52 days	U.S. Marine Corps
8	Steven M. Marks	Lieutenant General; Steven M. Marks	12 March 2026	Incumbent	179 days	U.S. Army

=== Senior enlisted leaders ===
No.	Senior enlisted leader		Term			Service branch
No.	Portrait	Name	Took office	Left office	Term length	Service branch
1	Rudolph E. Boesch	Command Master Chief; Rudolph E. Boesch (1928–2019)	April 1987	April 1990	~3 years, 0 days	U.S. Navy
2	Michael I. Lampe	Chief Master Sergeant; Michael I. Lampe (born 1949)	April 1991	1997	~6 years, 0 days	U.S. Air Force
3	Melvin L. Wick	Command Sergeant Major; Melvin L. Wick	1997	August 2000	~3 years, 134 days	U.S. Army
4	Richard M. Rogers	Command Master Chief; Richard M. Rogers	August 2000	27 August 2003	~2 years, 364 days	U.S. Navy
5	Robert V. Martens Jr.	Command Chief Master Sergeant; Robert V. Martens Jr.	27 August 2003	23 January 2006	2 years, 149 days	U.S. Air Force
6	Thomas H. Smith	Command Sergeant Major; Thomas H. Smith	23 January 2006	27 September 2011	5 years, 247 days	U.S. Army
7	James C. Faris	Command Sergeant Major; James C. Faris	27 September 2011	15 October 2014	3 years, 18 days	U.S. Army
8	William F. Thetford	Command Sergeant Major; William F. Thetford	15 October 2014	7 July 2016	1 year, 266 days	U.S. Army
9	Patrick L. McCauley	Command Sergeant Major; Patrick L. McCauley	7 July 2016	11 July 2019	3 years, 4 days	U.S. Army
10	Gregory A. Smith	Command Chief Master Sergeant; Gregory A. Smith	11 July 2019	4 August 2022	3 years, 24 days	U.S. Air Force
11	Shane W. Shorter	Command Sergeant Major; Shane W. Shorter	4 August 2022	5 September 2025	3 years, 32 days	U.S. Army
12	Andrew J. Krogman	Command Sergeant Major; Andrew J. Krogman	5 September 2025	Incumbent	1 year, 2 days	U.S. Army

=== Chiefs of staff ===
No.	Chief of Staff		Term			Service branch
No.	Portrait	Name	Took office	Left office	Term length	Service branch
1	Joseph Lutz	Major General; Joseph Lutz (1933–1999)	April 1987	June 1990	~3 years, 72 days	U.S. Army
-	Gary W. Heckman	Brigadier General; Gary W. Heckman	December 1997	August 1998	~243 days	U.S. Air Force
-	Dell L. Dailey	Major General; Dell L. Dailey (born 1949)	August 1998	2000	~1 year, 317 days	U.S. Army
-	Joseph Votel	Major General; Joseph Votel (born 1958)	~3 May 2010	May 2011	~1 year, 12 days	U.S. Army
-	Mark A. Clark	Major General; Mark A. Clark	May 2011	August 2012	~1 year, 92 days	U.S. Marine Corps
-	James B. Laster	Major General; James B. Laster	August 2012	2014	~1 year, 319 days	U.S. Marine Corps
-	Walter Lee Miller Jr.	Major General; Walter Lee Miller Jr.	~2014	~October 2015	~1 year, 107 days	U.S. Marine Corps
-	J. Marcus Hicks	Major General; J. Marcus Hicks	October 2015	June 2017	~1 year, 243 days	U.S. Air Force
-	James C. Slife	Major General; James C. Slife (born 1967)	June 2017	June 2018	~1 year, 0 days	U.S. Air Force
-	James B. Linder	Major General; James B. Linder	July 2018	July 2019	~1 year, 0 days	U.S. Army
-	Tony D. Bauernfeind	Major General; Tony D. Bauernfeind	July 2019	August 2020	~1 year, 31 days	U.S. Air Force
-	Collin P. Green	Rear Admiral; Collin P. Green (born 1962)	15 October 2020	September 2021	~335 days	U.S. Navy
-	Marcus S. Evans	Major General; Marcus S. Evans (born 1970)	September 2021	August 2023	~1 year, 334 days	U.S. Army
-	Milton Sands III	Rear Admiral; Milton Sands III	31 July 2023	July 2024	~336 days	U.S. Navy
-	Guillaume Beaurpere	Major General; Guillaume Beaurpere	July 2024	Incumbent	~2 years, 68 days	U.S. Army

== See also ==
- United States Special Operations Command
- Leadership of the United States Africa Command
- Leadership of the United States European Command
- Leadership of the United States Indo-Pacific Command
- Leadership of the United States Northern Command
- Leadership of the United States Space Command
- Leadership of the United States Cyber Command
- Leadership of the United States Strategic Command
- Leadership of the United States Transportation Command
