= Admiral Howe (disambiguation) =

Richard Howe, 1st Earl Howe (1726–1799), was a Royal Navy Admiral of the Fleet. Admiral Howe may also refer to:

- Jonathan Howe (born 1935), U.S. Navy admiral
- P. Gardner Howe III (born 1962), U.S. Navy vice admiral
