= Colin J. Kilrain =

US Navy vice-admiral (born 1958)

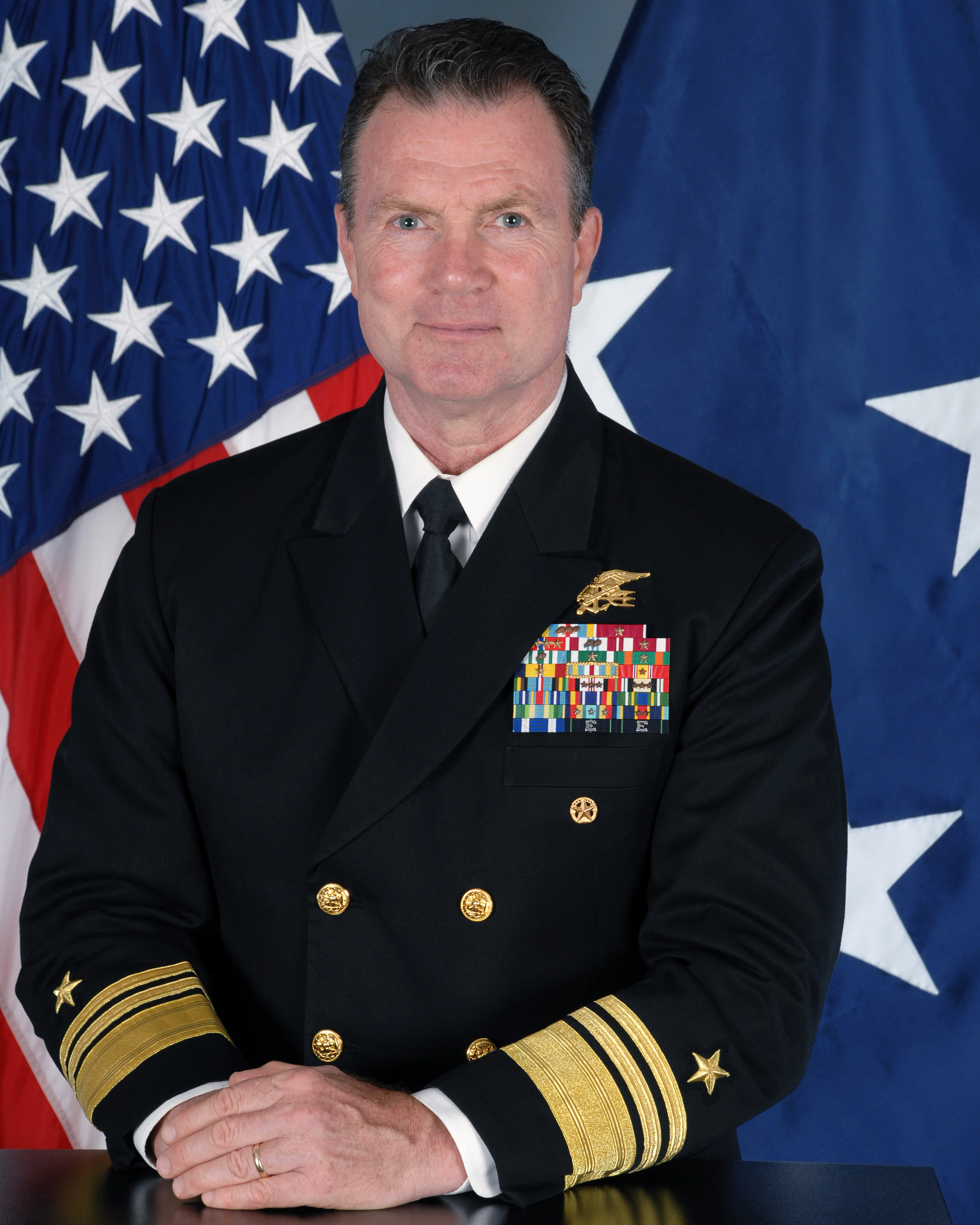
- Born: 1958 (age 67–68)
- Spouse: Susan Leigh Still (4 children)
- Military career
- Allegiance: United States
- Branch: United States Navy
- Service years: 1985–2023
- Rank: Vice Admiral
- Commands: Associate Directorate for Military Affairs, Central Intelligence Agency; Special Operations Command Pacific; Naval Special Warfare Group 2 SEAL Team 4 Naval Special Warfare Unit 4
- Conflicts: War in Afghanistan; Iraq War
- Awards: Defense Superior Service Medal (4); Legion of Merit (2); Bronze Star Medal (5)

Colin James Kilrain (born 1958) is a retired United States Navy vice admiral who last served as the assistant to the chairman of the Joint Chiefs of Staff from October 20, 2021 to February 2023. He previously served as the associate director for military affairs (ADMA) for the Central Intelligence Agency from 2019 to 2021. He is the former commander of Special Operations Command Pacific and Naval Special Warfare Group Two.

== Early life and education ==
Raised in Braintree, Massachusetts, Kilrain graduated from Lehigh University. While at Lehigh Kilrain was a three-time NCAA All-American wrestler.

== Naval career ==
Kilrain entered active duty with the United States Navy after completing Officer Candidate School in Newport, Rhode Island, in 1985. After his commission as an ensign, he received orders to Basic Underwater Demolition/SEAL training (BUD/S) at Naval Amphibious Base Coronado. After six months of training, Kilrain graduated BUD/S class 136 in February 1986. Following SEAL Tactical Training (STT) and completion of a six-month probationary period, he received the 1130 designator as a Naval Special Warfare Officer, entitled to wear the Special Warfare insignia, also known as the "SEAL Trident". As a Navy SEAL officer, Kilrain received his first assignment to SEAL TEAM TWO, where he served as assistant platoon commander and platoon commander until 1990. Kilrain studied German at the Defense Language Institute and was selected for an exchange program with the German Navy Kampfschwimmer in Eckenförde, Germany. In 1992, Kilrain volunteered for assignment to the Naval Special Warfare Development Group (NSWDG) at Dam Neck, Virginia and completed a specialized selection and training course. Kilrain served at NSWDG until 1995, planning, rehearsing and directing classified operations. Kilrain earned a Master of Science degree in national resources strategy and management from the Industrial College of the Armed Forces (ICAF).

Kilrain served numerous staff and command assignments, including as maritime operations officer, Special Operations Command South, Panama; executive officer, Naval Special Warfare Unit TWO, Germany; special operations adviser, USS Dwight D. Eisenhower (CVN-69); operations officer for the State Department's Office of Counterterrorism; commanding officer, Naval Special Warfare Unit FOUR, Puerto Rico from 2001 to 2003 and commanding officer, SEAL TEAM FOUR. Kilrain was promoted to the rank of captain in December 2006. He assumed command of Naval Special Warfare Group TWO (NSWG2) from 2009 to 2011, which was responsible for preparing East Coast based SEAL TEAMS for their operational deployments overseas.

He later served a staff tour as the director of Strategy and Policy for the Office of Combating Terrorism, National Security Council, Executive Office of the President at the White House during the Obama Administration. Kilrain later served as Senior Defense Officer at the U.S. Embassy in Mexico City. As a rear admiral, he served as assistant commander of Joint Special Operations Command in 2013 followed by assignment to Camp H. M. Smith, Hawaii as commander, Special Operations Command Pacific from 2014 to 2016. As a vice admiral, he served as commander, NATO Special Operations Headquarters, Supreme Headquarters Allied Powers Europe (SHAPE) from July 2016 to November 2019.

== Awards and decorations ==
U.S. military decorations
Defense Superior Service Medal with three bronze oak leaf clusters
Legion of Merit with one gold award star
Bronze Star Medal with four award stars
Defense Meritorious Service Medal with two oak leaf clusters
Meritorious Service Medal with award star
Joint Service Commendation Medal with oak leaf cluster
Navy and Marine Corps Commendation Medal with award star
Navy Achievement Medal with award star
Combat Action Ribbon with award star
Joint Meritorious Unit Award
U.S. Service (Campaign) Medals and Service and Training Ribbons
National Defense Service Medal with one bronze service star
Armed Forces Expeditionary Medal
Afghanistan Campaign Medal with three bronze campaign stars
Iraq Campaign Medal with three campaign stars
Global War on Terrorism Expeditionary Medal
Global War on Terrorism Service Medal
Korea Defense Service Medal
Armed Forces Service Medal
Navy Sea Service Deployment Ribbon with silver and two bronze service stars
Navy and Marine Corps Overseas Service Ribbon with two bronze service stars
Order of Merits to Lithuania, Officer
NATO Medal for service with ISAF
Navy Expert Rifleman Medal
Navy Expert Pistol Shot Medal

U.S. badges, patches and tabs
Special Warfare insignia
Navy and Marine Corps Parachutist Insignia
Command at Sea insignia

Military offices
Preceded by P. Gardner Howe III	Commander of the Special Operations Command Pacific; 2016	Succeeded by Bryan P. Fenton
Preceded by Marshall B. Webb	Commander of the NATO Special Operations Headquarters; 2016–2019	Succeeded by Eric P. Wendt
Preceded by P. Gardner Howe III	Associate Director for Military Affairs of the Central Intelligence Agency; 2019–2021	Succeeded by John D. Caine
Preceded by Ricky L. Waddell	Assistant to the Chairman of the Joint Chiefs of Staff; 2021–2023	Vacant
