= Marshall B. Webb =

US Air Force Lieutenant general

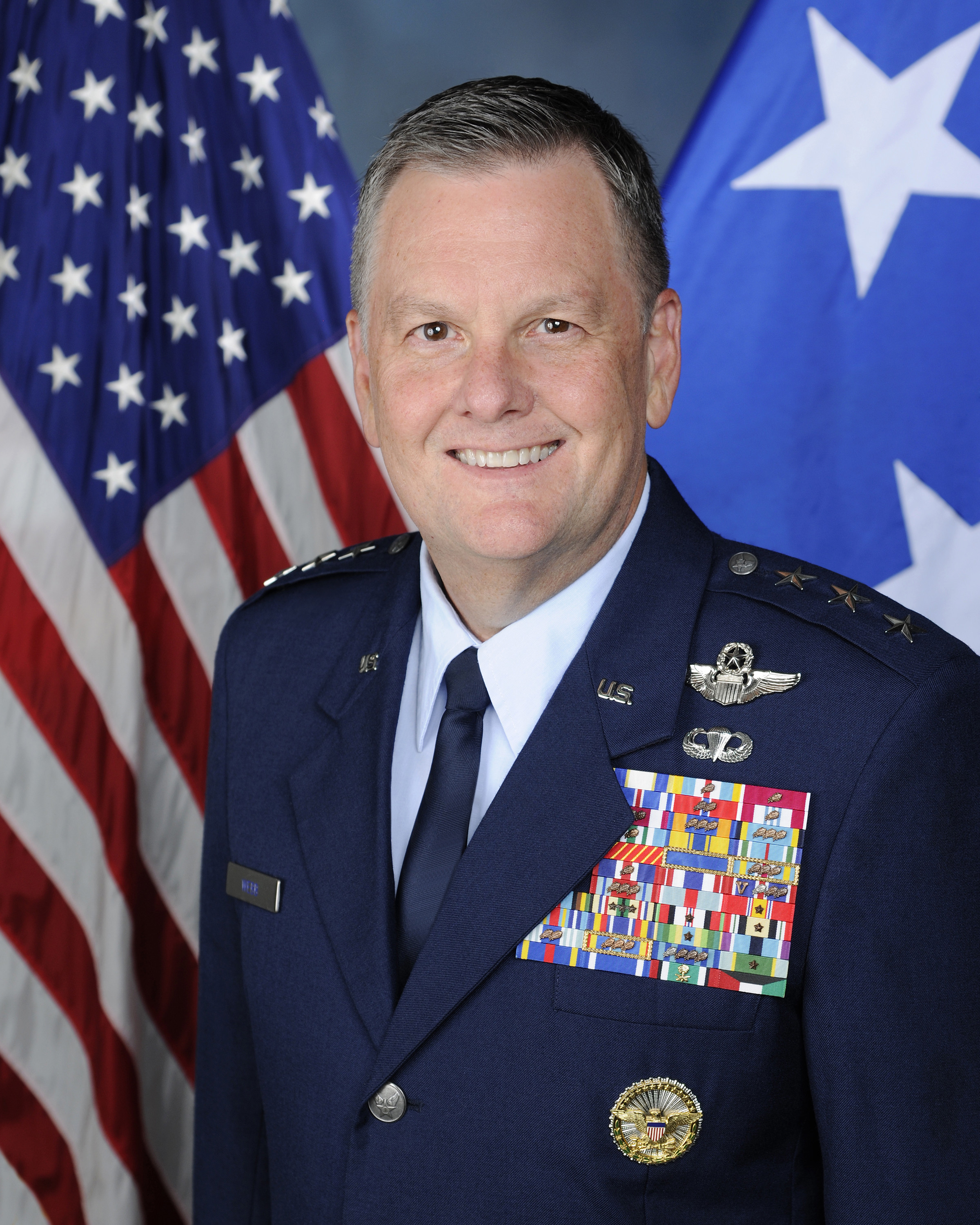
- Lieutenant General Brad Webb
- Born: Marshall Bradley Webb; November 27, 1961 (age 64)
- Alma mater: United States Air Force Academy (BS); Troy University (MS); National War College (MS)
- Military career
- Allegiance: United States
- Branch: United States Air Force
- Service years: 1984–2022
- Rank: Lieutenant General
- Commands: Air Education and Training Command; United States Air Force Special Operations Command; Special Operations Command Europe; Twenty-Third Air Force; 1st Special Operations Wing; 352nd Special Operations Group; 20th Special Operations Squadron
- Conflicts: Operation Joint Forge; Iraq War; War in Afghanistan
- Awards: Air Force Distinguished Service Medal (3); Defense Superior Service Medal (3); Legion of Merit (2); Distinguished Flying Cross; Bronze Star Medal (3)

Marshall Bradley "Brad" Webb (born November 27, 1961) is a retired United States Air Force lieutenant general who last served as commander of the Air Education and Training Command. He previously served as Commander, United States Air Force Special Operations Command and, before that, as Commander, NATO Special Operations Forces HQ. Previous to that assignment, he served as the Assistant Commanding General of Joint Special Operations Command (JSOC) and was involved in the 2011 operation to kill Osama bin Laden. Webb was seated next to President Barack Obama in the White House Situation Room during the mission.

== Military career ==
Raised in Austin, Texas, Webb is a command pilot with more than 3,700 flying hours (mostly in helicopters), including 117 combat hours in Afghanistan, Iraq and Bosnia. He commanded the 20th Special Operations Squadron, the 352nd Special Operations Group, the 1st Special Operations Wing and the Twenty-Third Air Force. His staff assignments include duty at the Joint Special Operations Command and in the Office of the Secretary of Defense (Policy).

In May 2019, Webb was nominated to be the commander of the Air Education and Training Command.

Webb retired from the U.S. Air Force on June 30, 2022.

== Education ==
1984 Bachelor of Science degree in biology, U.S. Air Force Academy, Colorado Springs, Colo.
1990 Squadron Officer School, Maxwell Air Force Base, Ala.
1994 Master of Science degree in international relations, Troy University, Ala.
1998 Air Command and Staff College, Maxwell AFB, Ala.
1998 Armed Forces Staff College, Norfolk, Va.
2003 Air War College, by correspondence
2004 Master of Science degree in national security strategy, National War College, Fort Lesley J. McNair, Washington, DC.
2006 Senior Leader Seminar, Brookings Institution/European Institute of Public Administration, Maastricht, Netherlands, and Brussels, Belgium
2007 Air Force Enterprise Leadership Seminar, Kenan-Flagler Business School, University of North Carolina at Chapel Hill
2008 Center for Creative Leadership, Greensboro, N.C.

== Assignments ==
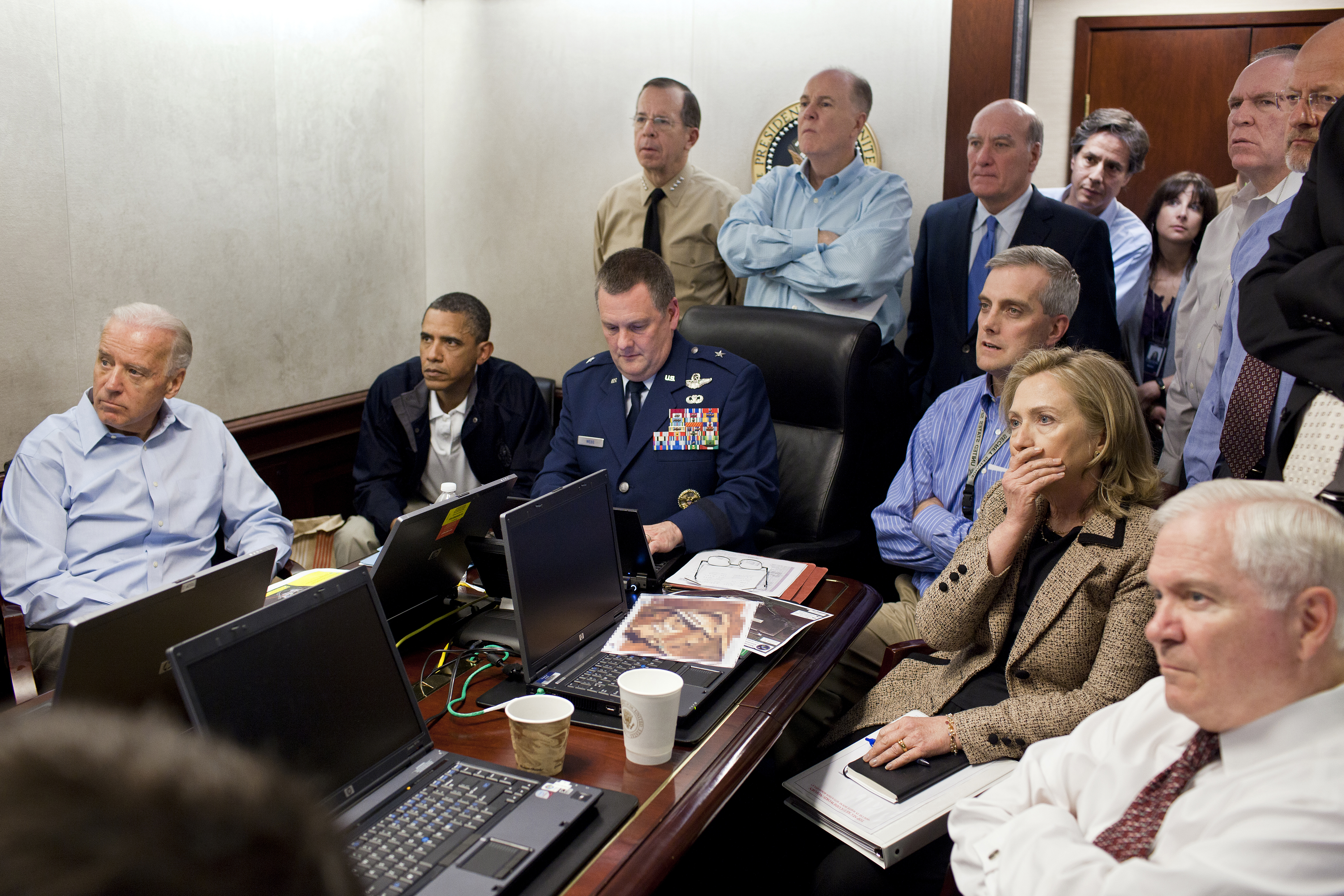
In this photograph, Situation Room, Webb is shown operating the laptop which is providing the live drone feed monitoring the mission to kill Osama bin Laden.

1. July 1984 – May 1985, student, undergraduate pilot training (helicopter), Fort Rucker, Ala.
2. May 1985 – July 1985, UH-1N upgrade training, Kirtland AFB, N.M.
3. August 1985 – November 1987, UH-1N pilot, Detachment 4, 40th Aerospace Rescue and Recovery Squadron, Hill AFB, Utah
4. November 1987– July 1994, MH-53H/J pilot, instructor pilot and flight examiner, 20th Special Operations Squadron, Hurlburt Field, Fla.
5. July 1994 – July 1997, MH-53J flight examiner, group flight safety officer and flight commander 352nd Special Operations Group, RAF Mildenhall, England
6. August 1997 – June 1998, student, Air Command and Staff College, Maxwell AFB, Ala.
7. July 1998 – September 1998, student, Armed Forces Staff College, Norfolk, Va.
8. September 1998 – September 2000, action officer, Strategic Plans and Policy (J5), Joint Special Operations Command, Fort Bragg, N.C.
9. September 2000 – June 2003, assistant operations officer, operations officer, and Commander, 20th Special Operations Squadron, Hurlburt Field, Fla.
10. August 2003 – June 2004, student, National War College, Fort Lesley J. McNair, Washington, D.C.
11. June 2004 – June 2005, Deputy Director, Northern Gulf, Office of the Under Secretary of Defense for Policy, Near Eastern and South Asian Affairs, the Pentagon, Washington, D.C.
12. June 2005 – June 2007, Commander, 352nd Special Operations Group and Joint Special Operations Air Component, Special Operations Command Europe, RAF Mildenhall, England
13. July 2007 – November 2008, Commander, 1st Special Operations Wing, Hurlburt Field, Fla. (January 2008 – February 2008, Commander, Joint Special Operations Air Component, Special Operations Command Central, Joint Base Balad, Iraq)
14. November 2008 – April 2009, special assistant to the Commander, Air Force Special Operations Command, Hurlburt Field, Fla.
15. April 2009 – June 2010, Commander, 23rd Air Force, and Director of Operations, Headquarters Air Force Special Operations Command, Hurlburt Field, Fla.
16. July 2010 – July 2012, Assistant Commanding General, Joint Special Operations Command, Fort Bragg, N.C.
17. July 2012 – July 2013, Director, Plans, Programs, Requirements, and Assessments, Air Force Special Operations Command, Hurlburt Field, Fla.
18. July 2013 – August 2014, Commander, Special Operations Command Europe, Stuttgart-Vaihingen, Germany
19. Aug 2014 – July 2016, Commander, NATO Special Operations Headquarters, Mons, Belgium
20. July 2016 – July 2019, Commander, U.S. Air Force Special Operations Command, Hurlburt Field, Fla.
21. July 2019 – May 2022, Commander, Air Education and Training Command, Joint Base San Antonio, Texas

== Awards and decorations ==
Personal decorations
	Air Force Distinguished Service Medal with two bronze oak leaf clusters
	Defense Superior Service Medal with one bronze oak leaf cluster
Width-44 crimson ribbon with a pair of width-2 white stripes on the edges	Legion of Merit with oak leaf cluster
	Distinguished Flying Cross
Width-44 scarlet ribbon with width-4 ultramarine blue stripe at center, surrounded by width-1 white stripes. Width-1 white stripes are at the edges.	Bronze Star Medal with two bronze oak leaf clusters
	Defense Meritorious Service Medal with bronze oak leaf cluster
Width-44 crimson ribbon with two width-8 white stripes at distance 4 from the edges.	Meritorious Service Medal with two bronze oak leaf clusters
	Air Medal with three bronze oak leaf clusters
	Aerial Achievement Medal with three bronze oak leaf clusters
	Joint Service Commendation Medal with bronze oak leaf cluster
	Air Force Commendation Medal
	Joint Service Achievement Medal
	Air Force Combat Action Medal
Unit awards
	Presidential Unit Citation
	Joint Meritorious Unit Award with three bronze oak leaf clusters
	Gallant Unit Citation with bronze oak leaf cluster
	Air Force Meritorious Unit Award
	Air Force Outstanding Unit Award with Valor device, one silver and two bronze oak leaf clusters
Service awards
	Combat Readiness Medal with three bronze oak leaf clusters
	Air Force Recognition Ribbon
Campaign and service medals
Width=44 scarlet ribbon with a central width-4 golden yellow stripe, flanked by pairs of width-1 scarlet, white, Old Glory blue, and white stripes	National Defense Service Medal with one bronze service star
	Armed Forces Expeditionary Medal with bronze service star
	Southwest Asia Service Medal with three bronze service stars
	Afghanistan Campaign Medal with bronze service star
	Iraq Campaign Medal with bronze service star
	Global War on Terrorism Expeditionary Medal
	Global War on Terrorism Service Medal
	Armed Forces Service Medal with bronze service star
	Humanitarian Service Medal
Service, training, and marksmanship awards
	Air Force Overseas Long Tour Service Ribbon with two oak leaf clusters
	Air Force Expeditionary Service Ribbon with gold frame and three bronze oak leaf clusters
	Air Force Longevity Service Award with one silver and three bronze oak leaf clusters
	Small Arms Expert Marksmanship Ribbon with bronze service star
	Air Force Training Ribbon
Foreign awards
	Lithuanian Medal of Distinction
	Polish Army Medal in gold
	Romanian Armed Forces Honorary Medal
	Ukraine Ministry of Defense Medal
	Ukraine Chief of General Staff Glory and Honor Badge
	NATO Meritorious Service Medal
	NATO Medal for Former Yugoslavia
	Kuwait Liberation Medal (Saudi Arabia)
	Kuwait Liberation Medal (Kuwait)

Other accoutrements
US Air Force Command Pilot Badge
Basic Parachutist Badge
Office of the Secretary of Defense Identification Badge

=== Other achievements ===
- 1996 Cheney Award for most valorous flight of the year in humanitarian regard.

== Effective dates of promotions ==
Rank	Date
Second Lieutenant	May 30, 1984
First Lieutenant	May 30, 1986
Captain	May 30, 1988
Major	April 1, 1996
Lieutenant Colonel	May 1, 2000
Colonel	July 1, 2005
Brigadier General	December 4, 2009
Major General	August 2, 2013
Lieutenant General	August 28, 2014

Military offices
Preceded by Paul LaCamera	Assistant Commanding General of Joint Special Operations Command; 2010–2012	Succeeded by Michael Kurilla
Preceded by Stephen A. Clark	Director of Strategic Plans, Programs and Requirements of the Air Force Special Operations Command; 2012–2013	Succeeded by Albert Elton
Preceded by Michael S. Repass	Commander of Special Operations Command Europe; 2013–2014	Succeeded by Gregory J. Lengyel
Preceded by Sean A. Pybus	Commander of the NATO Special Operations Headquarters; 2014–2016	Succeeded by Colin J. Kilrain
Preceded by Bradley Heithold	Commander of the Air Force Special Operations Command; 2016–2019	Succeeded by James C. Slife
Preceded by Steven L. Kwast	Commander of the Air Education and Training Command; 2019–2022	Succeeded by Brian S. Robinson
