= Bryan D. Brown =

United States Army general (born 1948)

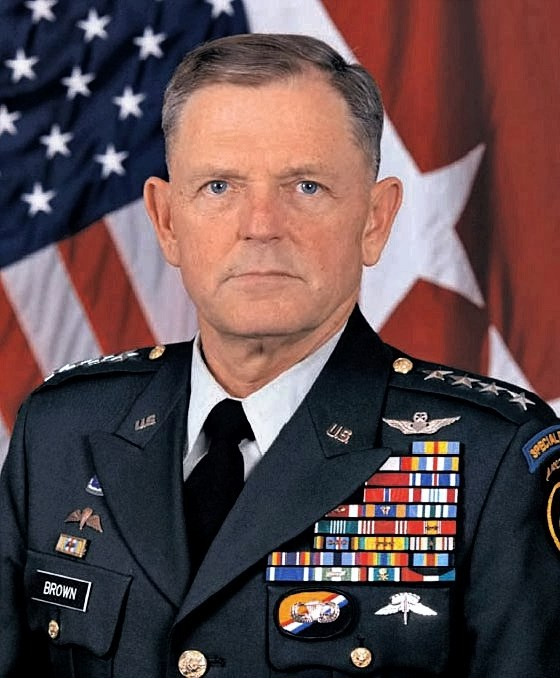
- General Bryan D. Brown
- Born: 20 October 1948 (age 77)
- Military career
- Allegiance: United States
- Branch: United States Army
- Service years: 1966–2007
- Rank: General
- Nickname: Doug
- Commands: United States Special Operations Command; United States Army Special Operations Command; Joint Special Operations Command; 160th Special Operations Aviation Regiment
- Conflicts: Vietnam War; Operation Urgent Fury; Gulf War
- Awards: Defense Distinguished Service Medal (3); Army Distinguished Service Medal; Defense Superior Service Medal; Legion of Merit; Distinguished Flying Cross; Bronze Star Medal; Complete list

Bryan Douglas "Doug" Brown (born 20 October 1948) is a retired four-star United States Army general. He retired in 2007 after four decades of military service. In his final assignment, he served as the seventh commander of United States Special Operations Command (USSOCOM), from 2 September 2003 to 9 July 2007. As USSOCOM's commander, he was responsible for all unified special operations forces, both active duty and reserve.

Brown joined the United States Army in 1967 as a private in the infantry and after graduating from Special Forces Qualification Course, he became a Green Beret. He enrolled in Officer Candidate School and was commissioned as a second lieutenant in May 1970. After attending Army Aviation School, he deployed to Vietnam as a UH-1 helicopter pilot. After the Vietnam War, he was part of a task force that would go on to later found the 160th Special Operations Aviation Regiment in 1981. During his stint in the 160th SOAR, Brown took part in numerous contingency operations in the 1980s and early 1990s. In 1983, Brown participated in the invasion of Grenada where his unit became the first aviation unit to use night vision goggles in combat. In the late 1980s, he led the 160th as it was assigned to Operation Prime Chance in the Persian Gulf amidst the Iran–Iraq War. Shortly thereafter, he commanded a battalion within 160th SOAR during Operation Desert Storm; after which he was promoted to colonel and commander of the regiment. After leaving 160th SOAR, Brown served at the helm of Joint Special Operations Command from 1998 to 2000 and then United States Army Special Operations Command from 2000 to 2002.

In 2002, Brown became the deputy commander of U.S. Special Operations Command and, holding the post until 2003 when he was selected to replace Air Force General Charles R. Holland as Commander of United States Special Operations Command. Shortly after becoming the head of USSOCOM, in 2004, he was involved in the aftermath of the Pat Tillman friendly fire incident which culminated when he testified before the congressional Committee on Oversight and Government Reform in 2007. Also during his tenure in command of USSOCOM, he announced the creation of Marine Corps Forces Special Operations Command in 2006. Brown retired in 2007 after leading USSOCOM through four years of the Iraq War and War in Afghanistan.

== Early life and family ==
Brown, a native of Fort Meade, Maryland, was born in 1948 and grew up in a military family. His father, Arnett Brown, was a member of the 89th Infantry Division during World War II, who became a command sergeant major and served in the Vietnam War. His mother was Mary Lou Brown. Brown played baseball and basketball in high school, and eventually made it onto a semi-pro baseball team in Fayetteville, North Carolina. In a 2009 interview with The Year in Special Operations, he commented on his short-lived semi-pro baseball career, saying, "I played three games with them and found that life couldn't be sustained on $3 per game". Losing interest in college, and with his father in Vietnam, he walked into a recruiting office and joined the army as an infantryman. He is married to Penelope "Penny" Brown (née Whightsil), a native of Fayetteville. Together, they have two daughters and six grandchildren. They also have two small dogs.

== Military service ==
=== Early military career and Vietnam ===
Brown entered the United States Army in 1966 as a private in the infantry. While attending Airborne School at Fort Bragg in North Carolina, he signed up for the Army Special Forces (SF) after meeting Army SF recruiters. After Brown completed the Special Forces Qualification Course, he was assigned to the 7th Special Forces Group. His interest in aviation started While at Mountain Ranger Camp, he became enthralled with helicopters after he was asked by a UH-1 helicopter pilot to assist him in conducting reconnaissance flight over northern Georgia. Immediately afterwards, he signed up for Officer Candidate School (OCS) and flight school. He graduated from OCS in May 1970, obtaining a field artillery officer commission as a second lieutenant. He was thereafter stationed at Camp Pelham, South Korea as part of the Headquarters and Headquarters Battery, 2/17th Field Artillery Regiment.

Brown went on to earn his aviator badge in 1971 after attending Army Aviation School at Fort Rucker, Alabama. After aviation school, he deployed to Vietnam as a UH-1 helicopter pilot in the 129th Assault Helicopter Company. He would go on to become the first member of the aviation branch to attain the rank of four-star general. In June 1978, Brown was assigned to the 158th Aviation Battalion at Fort Campbell, Kentucky flying Sikorsky UH-60 Black Hawks. While a member of the 158th Aviation Battalion. Brown was a Company Commander. The 158th Aviation Battalion was originally part of the 101st Aviation Group, the air arm of the 101st Airborne Division.

=== Operation Credible Sport ===
In 1979, Iranian students seized the American embassy in Tehran and held the embassy staff hostage; the first rescue operation, code-named Eagle Claw ended in failure due to equipment and coordination problems, culminating in the crash of a RH-53D Sea Stallion helicopter into a parked C-130 Hercules in the Iranian desert, killing eight servicemen. A second rescue attempt, Operation Honey Badger, was ordered, and Brown was involved in planning and preparation. The follow-up rescue included U.S. Air Force, U.S. Navy and Army assets. The Army units involved were the battalions that made up the 101st Aviation Group: the 158th Aviation Battalion, the 229th Aviation Battalion and the 159th Aviation Battalion. All three battalions formed Task Force 158. President Carter meanwhile appointed the former Chief of Naval Operations, Admiral James L. Holloway, III, to head a commission to study the deficiencies revealed by the failure of Eagle Claw. Among the presented findings was that the military lacked aircraft and crews who were trained and prepared to perform these mission types.

The Task Force began night flight training using night vision goggles (NVG) to develop nighttime extraction capabilities; however, they were doing so with AN/PVS-5 NVGs which were originally developed for ground forces. Never before had anyone in the U.S. Department of Defense flown in NVGs and the Task Force quickly adapted the NVGs for flying and by Brown's own words "a warrant officer figured out we could cut them apart and mount them to our helmets and increase our efficiency and safety by a huge margin. So there we were, without authority, cutting up goggles and building our own NVGs." Their nighttime training took place at Dugway Proving Ground, Utah. As a result of the night vision goggle training Brown asserted in a 2011 interview that "most of today's NVG tactics, techniques, and procedures as well as Black Hawk and Chinook modifications came directly from that mission." Ultimately Operation Credible Sport did not come to fruition due to a peaceful resolution to the crisis where the hostages were released as a result of long negotiations.

=== 160th SOAR ===
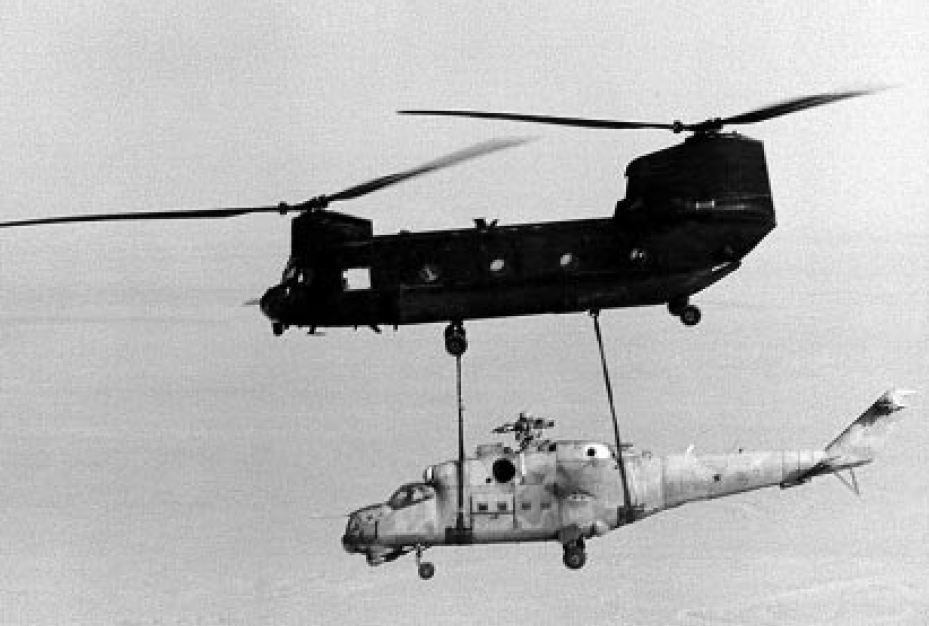
Company E of the 160th SOAR fly the slingloaded Mi-24 Hind helicopter out of northern Chad during Operation Mount Hope III

After Operation Honey Badger ended the Army leadership decided the unit was needed for future contingency operations. Thusly, on October 16, 1981, Task Force 158 became the 160th Aviation Battalion, with Brown a founding member. The choice of the unit's name was accepted by the U.S. Army Institute of Heraldry as a logical progression of the 101st's 158th and 159th Battalions. The 160th Aviation Battalion was later renamed the 160th Special Operations Aviation Group in 1986; it was not until 1990 when it would take on its current name, 160th Special Operations Aviation Regiment. In October 1983, Brown participated in the invasion of Grenada, during which his unit became the first aviation unit to use night vision goggles in combat. In the late 1980s, Brown led all U.S. aviation forces assigned to Operation Prime Chance, which provided escort security for American-flagged Kuwaiti tankers during the Iran–Iraq War. During Operation Prime Chance Brown's unit became the first aviation unit to engage in combat using night vision devices when they engaged an Iranian-flagged ship, Iran Ajr, that was seen deploying mines in the Persian Gulf.

In 1988, he participated in Operation Mount Hope III, during which U.S. forces recovered a crashed Soviet-made Mi-24 Hind attack helicopter in Chad. Company E of the 160th deployed to N'Djamena, Chad via C-5 Galaxy. Once in Chad the company flew two CH-47 Chinooks 490 nautical miles at night, without the use of navigational aids, to the crash site. Once at the crash site the crews harnessed the crashed Hind to a Chinook via sling-load. During the returning flight both Chinooks refueled twice at FARPs supported by C-130s; and later endured a sandstorm before returning with the Hind.

During the Persian Gulf War in 1991, Brown commanded a battalion within 160th SOAR for both Operation Desert Shield and Operation Desert Storm. Their missions during the operations included inserting and extracting Special Forces teams; resupplying SOF units; performing reconnaissance; and attacking pre-designated targets. Brown became the third commanding officer of the Regiment after Desert Storm.

=== General Officer ===
Between 1994 and 1996, Brown served as assistant division commander for maneuver, 1st Infantry Division (Mechanized), at Fort Riley, Kansas. He later served as director of Plans, Policy and Strategic Assessments (J5/J7) at U.S. Special Operations Command. As a major general, he commanded the Joint Special Operations Command (JSOC) from 1998 to 2000. Brown went on to lead U.S. Army Special Operations Command (USASOC) from October 2000 to 2002.

While at the helm of USASOC, Brown sought to modernize neglected aspects of Army special operations, mainly the civil affairs and psychological operations units. By the time Brown left, he had increased USASOC's budget by 200 percent. After leading all of the Army's special operations forces for two years, Brown was selected to become the Deputy Commander of U.S. Special Operations Command. He held the position from 2002 until 2003 when he was nominated to take over U.S. Special Operations Command.

=== Commander of USSOCOM ===
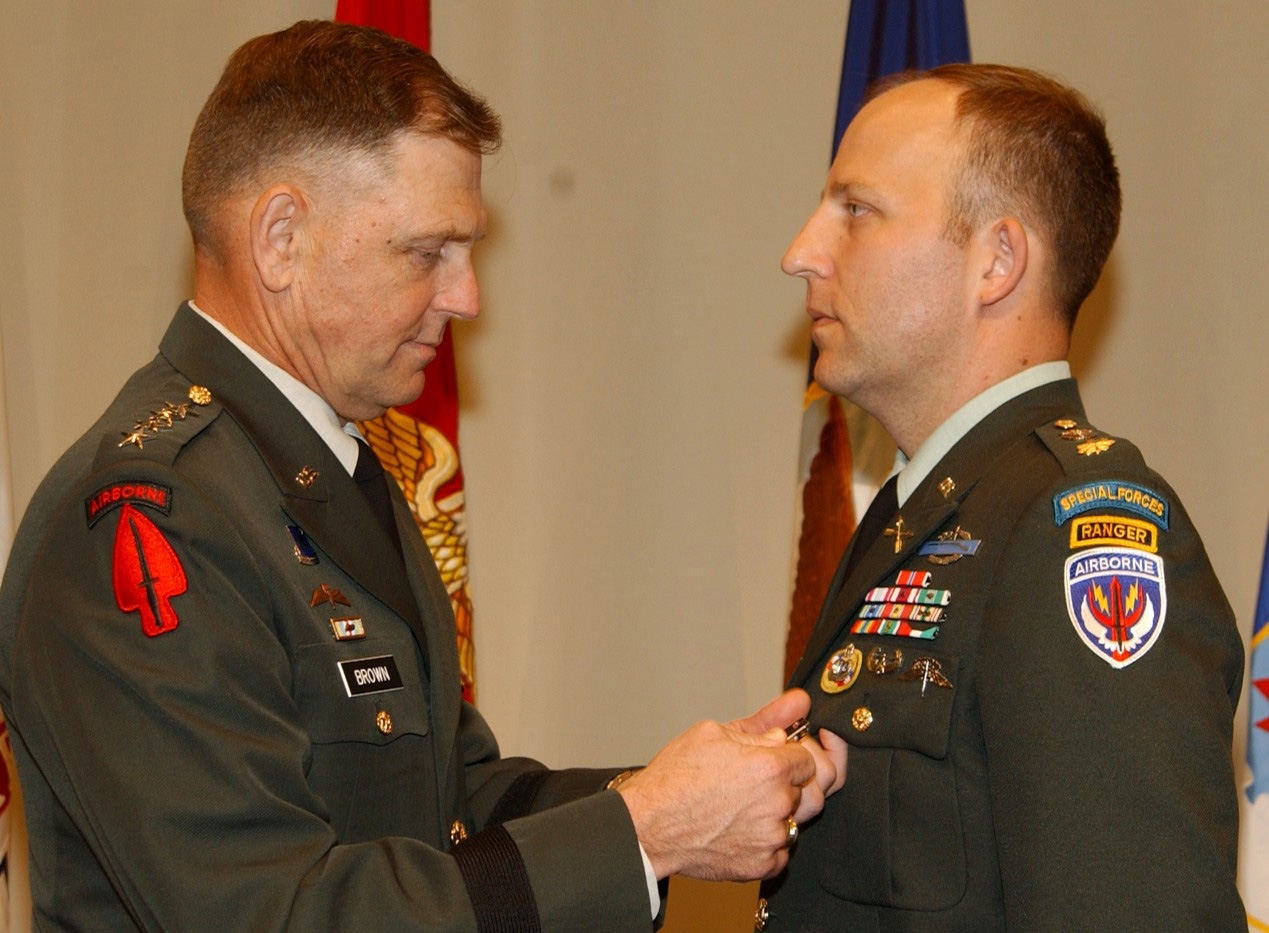
In 2003 Gen Brown awarded the first Distinguished Service Cross since Vietnam to Maj. Mark Mitchell for combat actions during the 2001 Battle of Qala-i-Jangi

On 2 September 2003, Brown replaced Air Force General Charles R. Holland as the Commander of U.S. Special Operations Command. During Brown's tenure as USSOCOM commander, he was involved in the aftermath of the Pat Tillman friendly fire incident that occurred in early 2004. He testified before the congressional Committee on Oversight and Government Reform in 2007 about receiving a memo from Lt. Gen. Stanley McChrystal, then-commander of JSOC, informing Brown that it was "highly possible that Corporal Tillman was killed by friendly fire". Ultimately, former commanding general of USASOC Lt. Gen. Philip Kensinger and other Army officers were held responsible for the mishandling of information surrounding Tillman's death.

On 23 November 2005, Brown, together with U.S. Secretary of Defense Donald Rumsfeld, and Marine Corps Commandant General Michael Hagee announced the creation of the Marine Corps Forces Special Operations Command (MARSOC). Prior to the creation of MARSOC, the Marine Corps had not been involved in special operations, which were conducted by Army, Navy and Air Force units assigned to U.S. Special Operations Command. After the 9/11 attacks, the Secretary of Defense had directed the Marine Corps and Brown's predecessor to work closer together. This culminated in the creation of MCSOCOM Detachment One on June 19, 2003, shortly before Brown took command of USSOCOM. It was nearly three years later on 24 February 2006, when MARSOC was activated at Camp Lejeune, North Carolina.

In 2006, Brown oversaw the SOF component of the Quadrennial Defense Review (QDR), a legislatively-mandated study by the Department of Defense that analyzes strategic objectives and potential military threats. As a result of Brown's contributions to the 2006 QDR were considered a success and a "major stride forward" in preparing U.S. special forces for future contingencies by increasing the SOF budget and manpower. As a result of the 2006 QDR the capabilities of USSOCOM were greatly expanded, including increasing active-duty Special Forces battalions by one-third, expansion of psychological operations and civil affairs units by 33%, increasing the number of Navy SEALs, among other major changes.

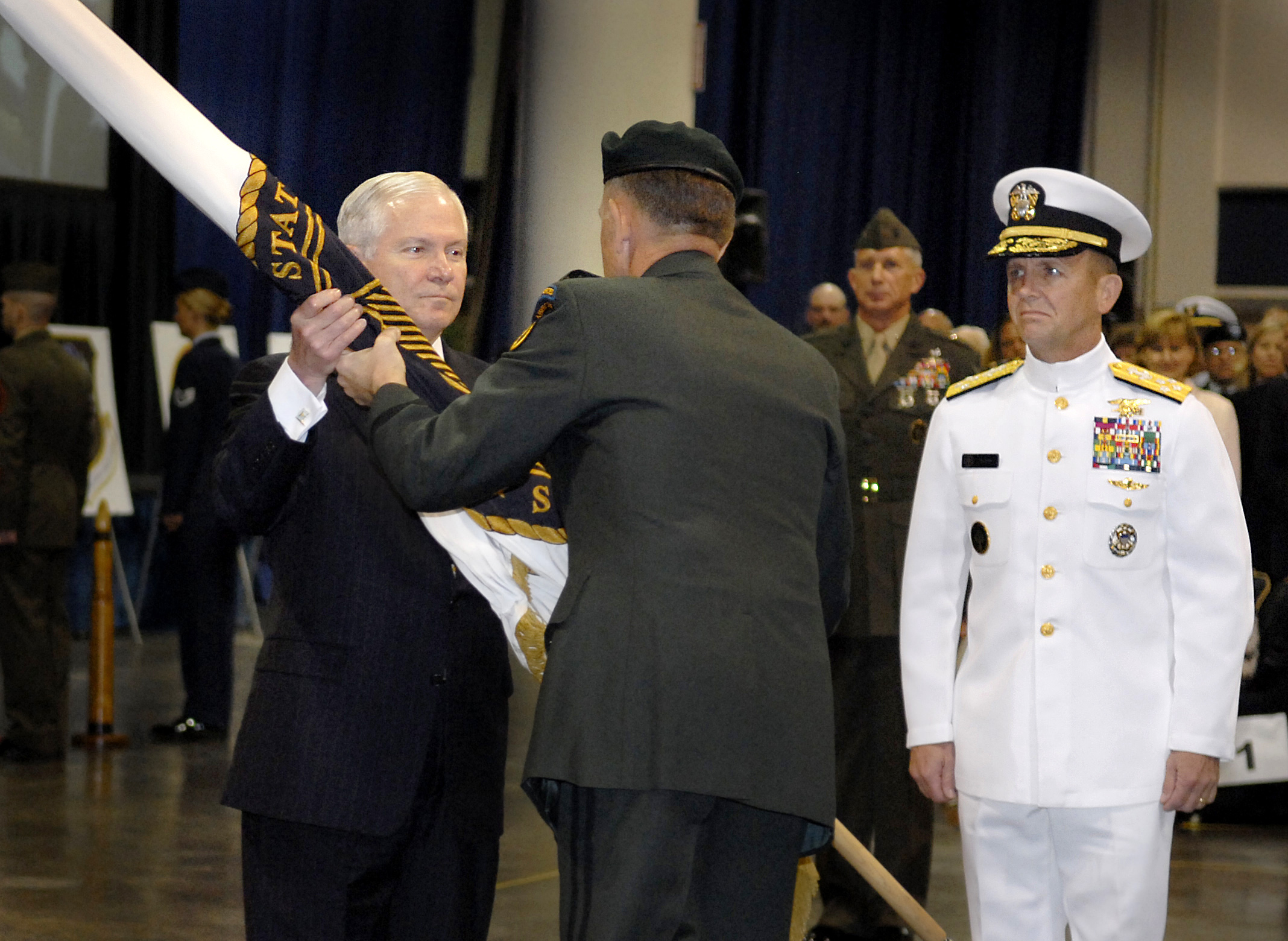
Gen. Brown hands over the USSOCOM flag to Secretary of Defense Robert Gates with Admiral Olson preparing to take charge of the command in 2007

After four years of leading USSOCOM through the Iraq War and War in Afghanistan, President George W. Bush nominated Rear Admiral Eric T. Olson to succeed Brown as the commander of U.S. Special Operations Command on 11 May 2007. Brown and Olson had served at the USSOCOM headquarters in Tampa together for four years, and Olson had been the deputy commander since 2003. The change of command ceremony took place on 9 July 2007, at the Tampa Convention Center. It was presided over by Secretary of Defense Robert Gates. During the ceremony, Gates said, "He came to this post four years ago determined to improve the way special operators fight. He has done just that". At the time of the change of command ceremony, Brown was the longest serving commander in U.S. Special Operations Command history with 1,406 days in office. Over the course of his military career, Brown amassed a total of 4,400 hours of flight time in fixed and rotary-winged aircraft.

== Education ==
His military education included the Field Artillery Officer Advance Course, U.S. Army Command and General Staff College and the United States Army War College. At the Army War College in 1992, a then-Lieutenant Colonel Brown co-wrote a military studies program with future United States Northern Command commander, Victor E. Renuart, Jr., in a paper titled Combat Search and Rescue: A Search for Tomorrow. In it, Brown was highly critical of the United States Air Force, saying, "The U.S. Air Force is the proponent agency for search and rescue, but chose not to deploy any forces to Desert Storm". Brown graduated from the Harvard Executive Education Program's National and International Security Managers Course. He received a bachelor's degree in history from Cameron University, as well as a master's degree in business from Webster University.

== Post-military life ==
In November 2007, shortly after Brown retired from the Army, he joined the board of directors for Aurora Flight Sciences, which specializes in the scientific and military applications of robotic aircraft and aerospace vehicles. Brown is the president and founder of his own consultation firm, Tier 4 Consulting. He served from 2007 till 2018 on the Board of the Special Operations Warrior Foundation, a four star rated charity supporting education for the children of fallen Special Operators, serving the last five years as the chairman.

== Awards and honors ==
General Brown was awarded the following military awards and decorations:

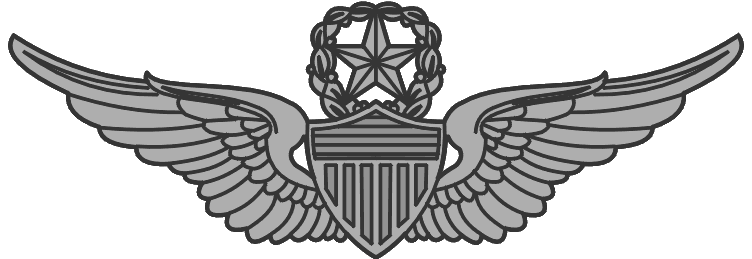

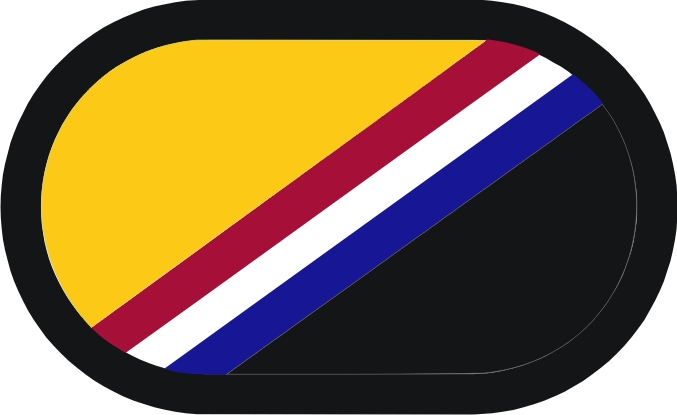

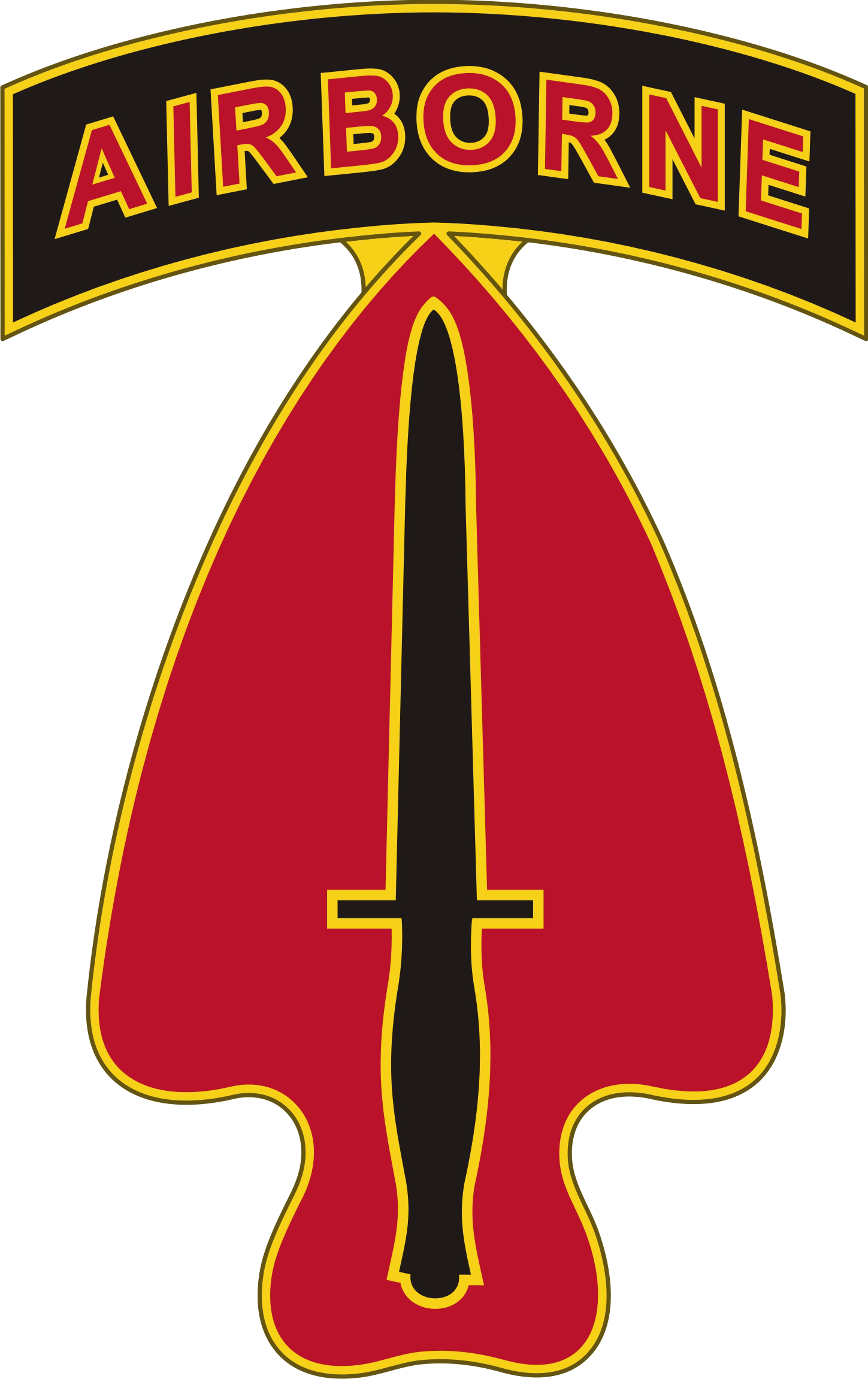

Badge	Master Aviator Badge		160th Special Operations Aviation Regiment (Airborne) DUI		
Badge	Parachutist Badge		United States Army Special Operations Command CSIB		United States Special Operations Command Badge
Badge	Special Forces Tab		Military Free Fall Parachute Badge		Irish Parachutist Badge in bronze
1st Row Awards	Defense Distinguished Service Medal w/ 2 bronze oak leaf clusters	Distinguished Service Medal		Defense Superior Service Medal	
2nd Row Awards	Legion of Merit	Distinguished Flying Cross	Bronze Star	Defense Meritorious Service Medal	
3rd Row Awards	Meritorious Service Medal w/ 2 oak leaf clusters	Air Medal w/ valor device	Joint Service Commendation Medal	Army Commendation Medal	
4th Row Awards	Joint Meritorious Unit Award w/ 2 oak leaf clusters	Army Good Conduct Medal	National Defense Service Medal w/ 2 service stars	Armed Forces Expeditionary Medal w/ 3 service stars	
5th Row Awards	Vietnam Service Medal w/ 3 service stars	Southwest Asia Service Medal w/ 1 service star	Global War on Terrorism Service Medal	Humanitarian Service Medal	
6th Row Awards	Army Service Ribbon	Army Overseas Service Ribbon	NATO Medal for Former Yugoslavia	Vietnam Gallantry Cross Unit Citation	
7th Row Awards	Vietnam Civil Actions Medal Unit Citation	Vietnam Campaign Medal	Kuwait Liberation Medal (Saudi Arabia)	Kuwait Liberation Medal (Kuwait)	

=== Other accolades ===
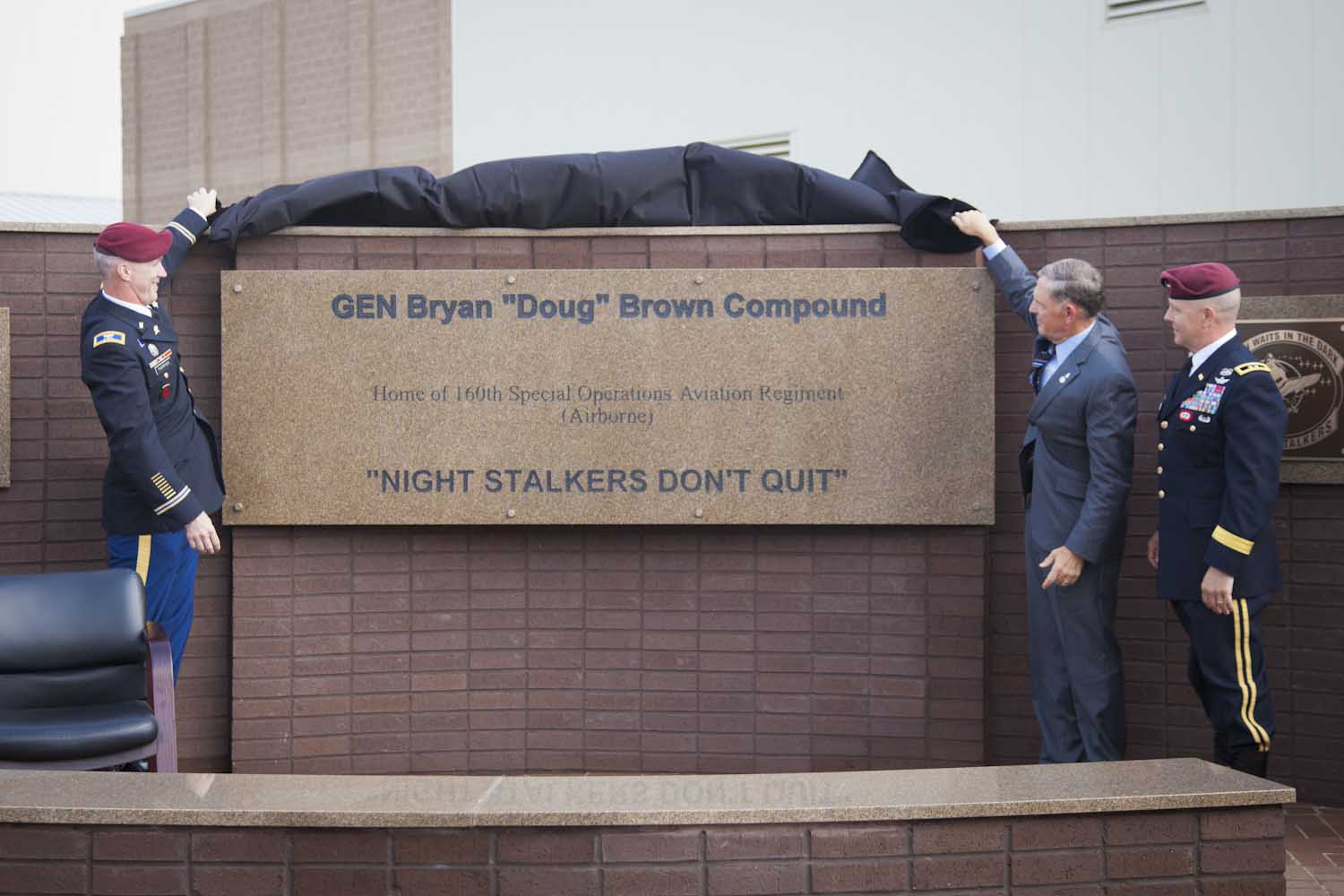
The dedication ceremony for renaming the 160th SOAR compound the "GEN Bryan "Doug" Brown Compound"

Shortly after his retirement, Brown was named "Patriot of the Year" for 2007 by the Congressional Medal of Honor Society, and he also received the Ellis Island Medal of Honor. The following year, he was inducted into the Army Aviation Hall of Fame. The Association of Special Operations Professionals named Brown "Man of the Year" in 2011. In 2012, the 160th SOAR compound at Fort Campbell was renamed the "Gen. Bryan "Doug" Brown Compound" in his honor.

== In film ==
Year	Title	Portrayal	Notes
2010	The Tillman Story	Himself	The documentary shows footage of Brown's testimony before the Committee on Oversight and Government Reform in 2007.

== Works by Brown ==
- Bryan D. Brown; Victor E. Renuart, Jr. (1992). Combat Search and Rescue: A Search for Tomorrow (PDF). Carlisle Barracks, Pennsylvania: United States Army War College. Archived (PDF) from the original on 12 November 2013.
- Bryan D. Brown (2001). "The 160th SOAR: The Quiet Aviation Professionals". Special Warfare: The Professional Bulletin of the John F. Kennedy Special Warfare Center and School. 14 (3). John F. Kennedy Special Warfare Center and School: 2–4.
- Bryan D. Brown (2006). "U.S. Special Operations Command: Meeting the Challenges of the 21st Century". 4 (40). Joint Force Quarterly. Archived from the original on August 5, 2011.

== See also ==
Military offices
Preceded by Michael Canavan	Commander of Joint Special Operations Command; 1998–2000	Succeeded by Dell L. Dailey
Preceded by William Tangney	Commander of United States Army Special Operations Command; 2000–2002	Succeeded by Philip R. Kensinger, Jr.
Preceded by Charles R. Holland	Commander of United States Special Operations Command; 2003–2007	Succeeded by Eric T. Olson
