= Special Operations Command Pacific =

United States military unit

Special Operations Command, Pacific
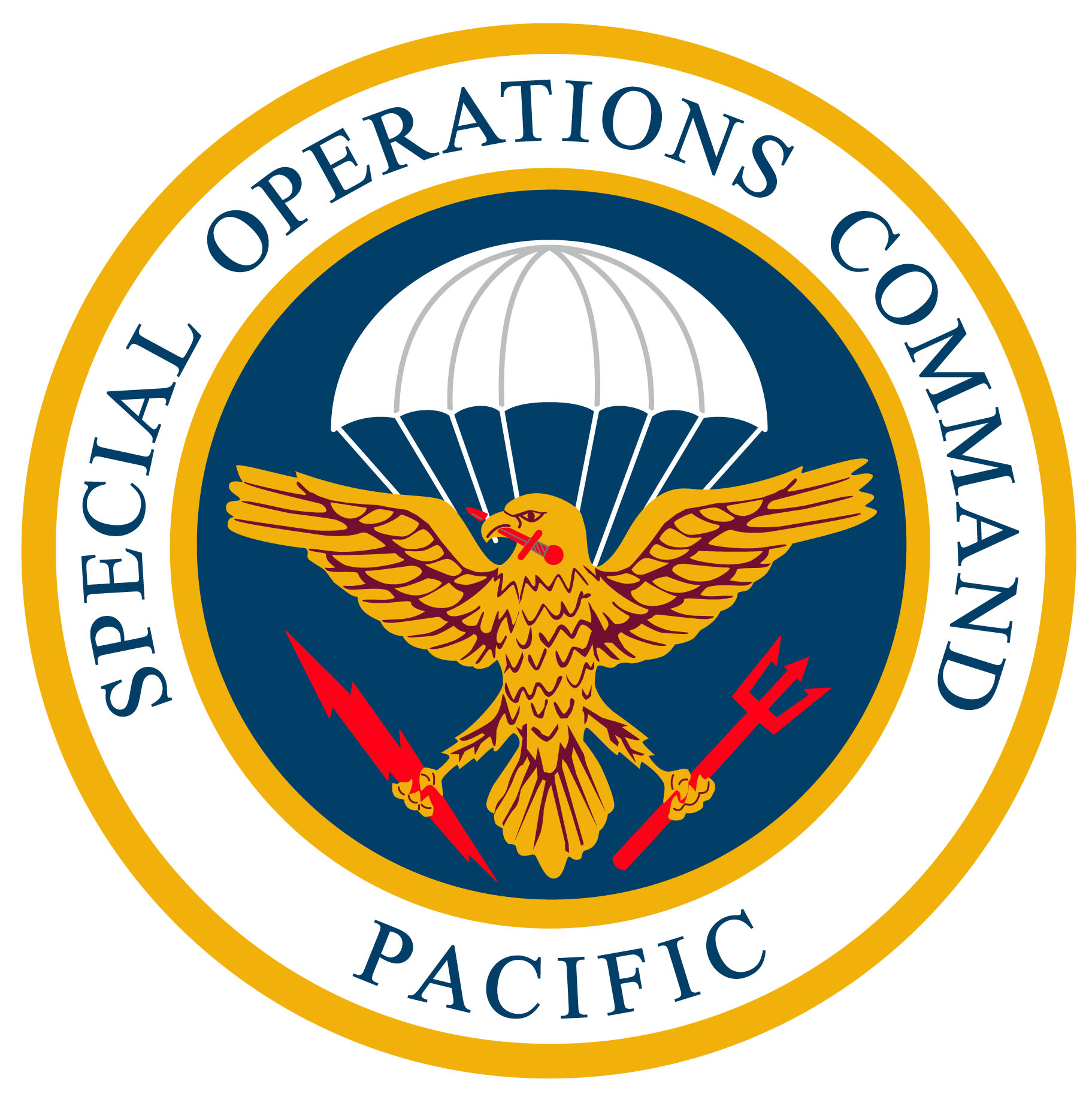
- SOCPAC insignia
- Active: 1 November 1965 – present
- Country: United States of America
- Type: Special Operations
- Role: Provide fully capable Special Operations Forces to defend the United States and its interests and plan and synchronize operations against terrorist networks
- Part of: United States Special Operations Command; United States Pacific Command
- Garrison/HQ: Camp H. M. Smith
- Color of berets (U.S. Army Personnel): Tan Maroon Rifle green
- Engagements: Operation Enduring Freedom – Philippines

Commanders
- Commander: BG Michael D. Rose
- Notable commanders: P. Gardner Howe, III

Insignia
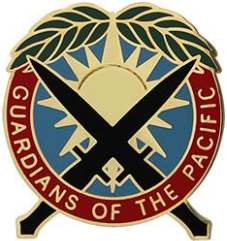
- Distinctive unit insignia (U.S. Army personnel)

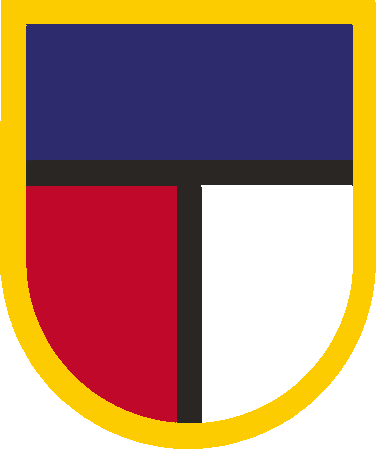
- Beret flash (U.S. Army Personnel)

- Shoulder Sleeve Insignia (U.S. Army Personnel)

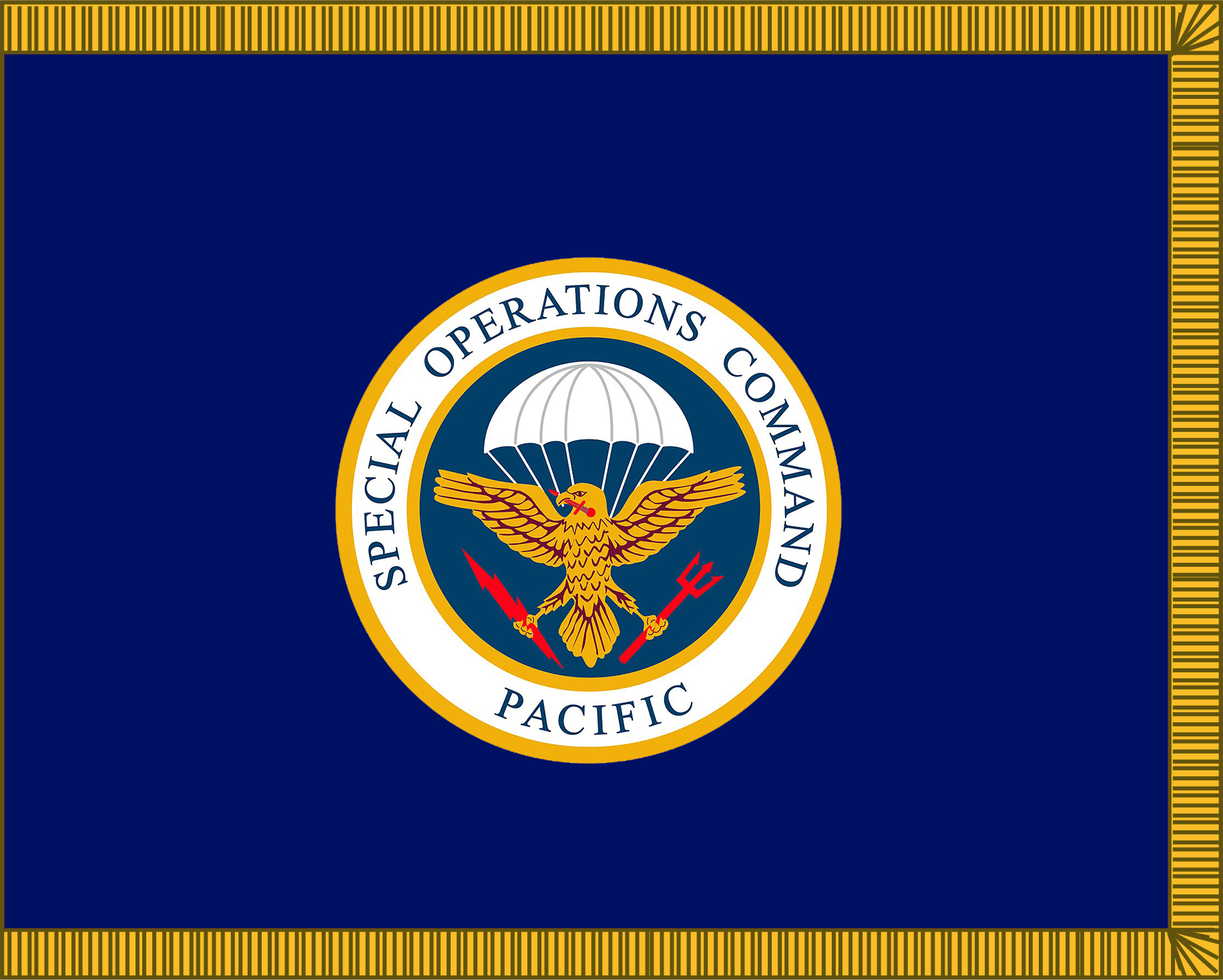
- US Special Operations Command Pacific Flag

The Special Operations Command Pacific, known as SOCPAC or USSOCPAC, is a sub-unified command of the United States Department of Defense for special operations forces in the United States Pacific Command (USPACOM) area of responsibility.

== History ==
The Special Operations Center, Pacific Command was established 1 November 1965. Headquartered in Okinawa, the unit provided unconventional warfare task force support for operations in Southeast Asia. After these functions transferred to the Commander in Chief, Pacific Command (CINCPAC), the command dissolved on 1 July 1969. A special operations staff was established in the CINCPAC Operations Directorate on 15 May 1976, for planning and coordinating in-theater special operations.

In October 1983, the U.S. Joint Chiefs of Staff established special operations commands in the Pacific and European Theaters. Special Operations Command, Pacific (SOCPAC) was activated on 1 November 1983 with only eighteen personnel. Six years later, on 28 December 1989, SOCPAC was assigned operational control of what is now the 353d Special Operations Group and 1st Battalion, 1st Special Forces Group (Airborne), which are located on Okinawa, Japan at Kadena Air Base and Torii Station, respectively. On 8 July 1991, SOCPAC assumed control of Naval Special Warfare Task Unit-Pacific and a platoon of United States Navy SEALs, based at Apra Harbor in Guam. In early March 2001, SOCPAC established the Joint Special Operations Aviation Component. On 11 June 2001, SOCPAC gained control over E Company, 160th Special Operations Regiment (Airborne), which is based in Daegu in South Korea.

As a subordinate unified command of the United States Indo-Pacific Command, SOCPAC units deploy throughout the Pacific. SOCPAC annually conducts small unit exchanges, joint and combined training events, and operational deployments throughout the Pacific. Units are used for counterdrug and humanitarian demining operations, training forces in countries such as Thailand, Laos, Cambodia, Vietnam, and the Philippines. SOCPAC hosts an annual Pacific Area Special Operations Conference in Hawaii for over 200 U.S. and foreign delegates.

The command can operate as a rapidly deployable Joint Task Force. In January 2002, SOCPAC deployed to the Southern Philippines as JTF 510, conducting counterterrorist operations with the Philippine Government under Operation Enduring Freedom. The force redeployed on 1 September 2002, leaving elements to form the Joint Special Operations Task Force-Peppery Philippines with the Armed Forces of the Philippines.

The command is headquartered at Camp H. M. Smith in Hawaii. From 1995 to 1997 Air Force General Charles R. Holland commanded SOCPAC. From 2000 to 2003 Donald C. Wurster was commander, David P. Fridovich commanded from 2005 to 2007, and then Salvatore F. Cambria. In June 2009 Rear Admiral Sean A. Pybus became commander of SOCPAC.

From 2020 to 2021, under the leadership of Jonathan P. Braga, the command oversaw a propaganda campaign to spread disinformation about the Chinese-manufactured COVID-19 vaccine Sinovac. Reuters described the U.S. campaign as designed to "counter what it perceived as China’s growing influence in the Philippines". A Pentagon spokesperson stated it was a response to "China's COVID diplomacy and propaganda." As part of the campaign, military personnel and contractors at MacDill Air Force Base operated hundreds of fake social media accounts which targeted the Philippines and later expanded to Central Asian and Middle Eastern countries. The private defense contractor for the project was General Dynamics IT.

== List of commanders ==
- Maj Gen Charles R. Holland, June 1995 – June 1997
- Brig Gen Donald C. Wurster, October 2000 – February 2003
- MG David P. Fridovich, 2005 to 2007
- Salvatore F. Cambria
- RADM Sean A. Pybus, June 2009
- Maj Gen Norman J. Brozenick Jr., June 2011
- RADM P. Gardner Howe III, 10 June 2013
- RADM Colin J. Kilrain, ~August 2014
- MG Bryan P. Fenton, 9 June 2016
- MajGen Daniel D. Yoo, 12 May 2017
- MG Jonathan P. Braga, 27 July 2018
- MG Joshua M. Rudd, 14 August 2020
- RDML Jeromy B. Williams, 19 July 2022
- MG Jeffrey A. VanAntwerp, 3 July 2025
