= David P. Fridovich =

United States Army general

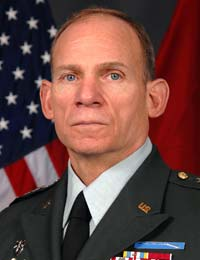
- Lieutenant General David P. Fridovich
- Military career
- Allegiance: United States of America
- Branch: United States Army
- Service years: 1974-2011
- Rank: Lieutenant General
- Commands: Deputy Commander, United States Special Operations Command

David P. Fridovich is a retired lieutenant general and Green Beret in the United States Army. His position at the time of retirement was deputy commander of the U.S. military's United States Special Operations Command that directs special operations campaigns.

Fridovich is a 1974 graduate of Knox College where he was a member of Tau Kappa Epsilon. He received his master's degree in political science from Tulane University in 1976.

== Military career ==
After graduation, Fridovich was commissioned an Infantry Second Lieutenant. He served as a Rifle and Reconnaissance Platoon Leader, Company Executive Officer, and Light Infantry Company Commander with the 172nd Light Infantry Brigade, Fort Richardson, Alaska. He was appointed assistant professor of military science at Norwich University, where he trained the Mountain Cold Weather Cadre and Rescue Team.

In 1984, Fridovich completed the US Army Special Forces (SF) Detachment Officer's Qualification course and reported to the 1st Special Forces Group (Airborne) at Fort Lewis, Washington, where he commanded both an SF Operational Detachment Alpha (ODA) and Bravo (ODB) in the 3rd Battalion before becoming the battalion operations officer. He commanded the Combined/Joint Special Operations Task Force in Operation Joint Forge, Sarajevo, Bosnia-Herzegovina, from January through July 2000.

In 2005, Fridovich was appointed commander, Special Operations Command, Pacific. He subsequently assumed duties as the director, Center for Special Operations, United States Special Operations Command in 2007. In 2010 he was appointed as deputy commander, United States Special Operations Command.

Fridovich retired on November 14, 2011, after more than 37 years of service in the U.S. Army. At the time of his retirement, he was the senior Green Beret in the Army.
