= Raymond C. Smith =

American Navy admiral (1943–2022)

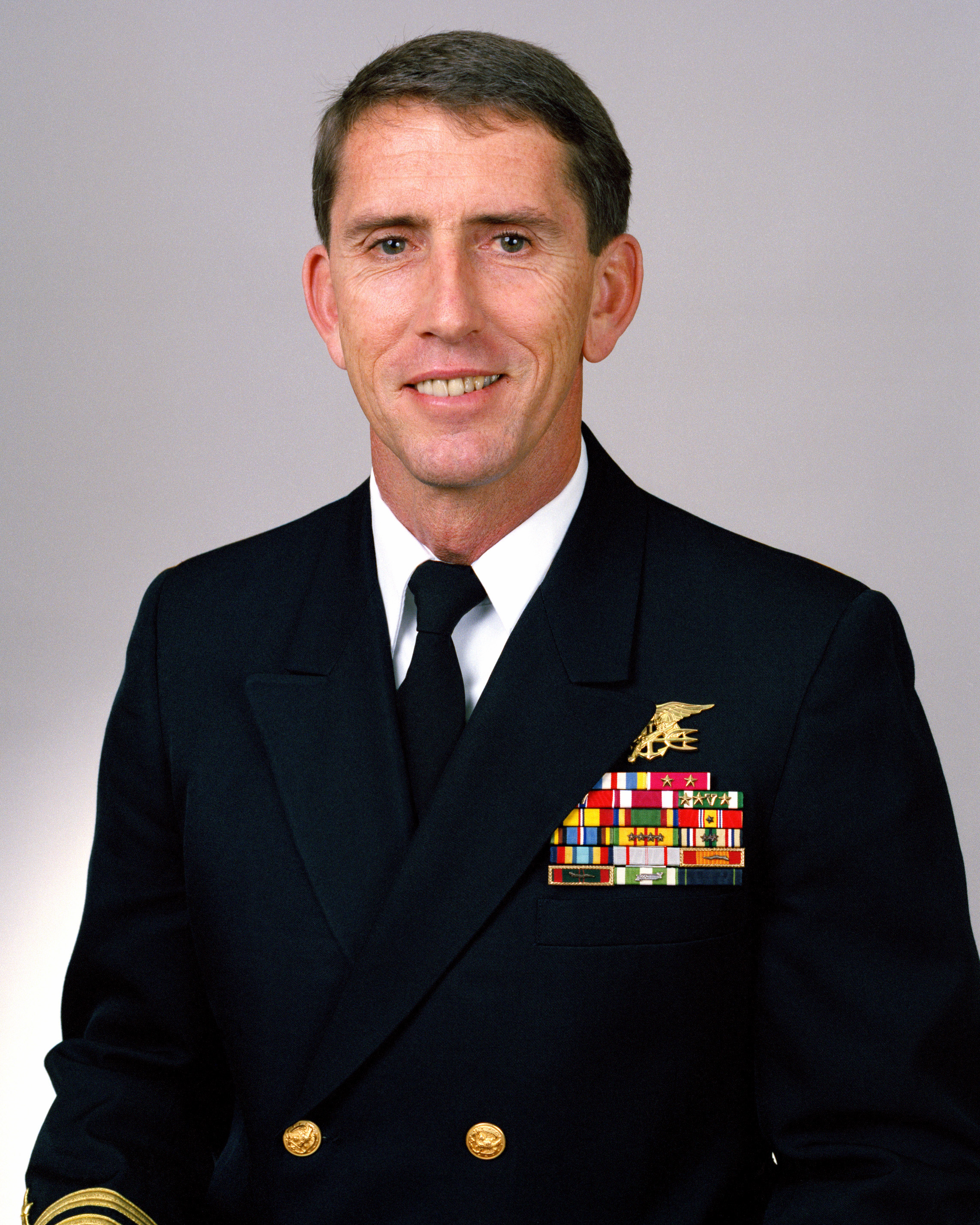
- Rear Admiral Raymond C. Smith, 1992
- Born: 6 July 1943; San Francisco, California, U.S.
- Died: 6 February 2022 (aged 78); Coronado, California, U.S.
- Military career
- Allegiance: United States of America
- Branch: United States Navy
- Service years: 1967–2001
- Rank: Rear admiral
- Commands: SEAL Delivery Vehicle Team ONE; Naval Special Warfare Command
- Conflicts: Vietnam War; Gulf War
- Awards: Defense Distinguished Service Medal; Defense Superior Service Medal; Legion of Merit (5)

Raymond Charles Smith Jr. (6 July 1943 – 6 February 2022) was a United States Navy rear admiral who commanded the Naval Special Warfare Command from 1992 to 1996.

== Naval career ==
Born in San Francisco on 6 July 1943 and raised in Vallejo, California, Smith enlisted in the US Navy in 1962. He was later selected to attend Naval Academy Preparatory School and subsequently received an appointment to attend the United States Naval Academy. Smith graduated from the Naval Academy in 1967 and subsequently served on USS Floyd B. Parks until 1969.

Smith then reported to Basic Underwater Demolition/SEAL training (BUD/S) at Naval Amphibious Base Coronado. After six months of training, Smith graduated with BUD/S class 54 in February 1970. Smith's first assignment was to Underwater Demolition Team TWELVE (UDT-12) and he served a combat deployment to South Vietnam. He later went on to receive a Master of Science degree in Physical Oceanography from the Naval Postgraduate School in 1974.

Smith served staff assignments as operations officer and executive officer of UDT 12, followed by an assignment SEAL weapons and diving systems Acquisition Manager in Washington D.C. Smith was assigned as director of SEAL training at Naval Amphibious Base Coronado from 1981 to 1983, then served as executive assistant to the Assistant Secretary of Defense Richard Armitage.

Smith then served as commanding officer of SEAL Delivery Vehicle Team ONE from 1985 to 1987. As a Navy Captain, Smith assumed command of Naval Special Warfare Group ONE (NSWG 1) in August 1989. During Operation Desert Shield and Desert Storm he led all SEAL, Special Boat personnel during completion of hundreds of special operations missions. Smith relinquished command of NSWG 1 in 1991. Between 1992 and 1996 Smith served as the commanding officer of the Naval Special Warfare Command. His final assignment was deputy commanding officer of United States Special Operations Command. He retired from active duty in 2001 after 34 years of service.

He died at his home in Coronado on 6 February 2022.

=== Awards and decorations ===
U.S. military decorations
Defense Distinguished Service Medal
Defense Superior Service Medal
Legion of Merit with four 5/16 inch stars
Bronze Star with Combat "V"
Purple Heart
Meritorious Service Medal
Navy and Marine Corps Commendation Medal with Combat "V" and three 5/16 inch stars
Joint Meritorious Unit Award
Combat Action Ribbon
Navy Unit Commendation
U.S. Service (Campaign) Medals and Service and Training Ribbons
National Defense Service Medal with two service stars
Armed Forces Expeditionary Medal
Vietnam Service Medal (with four bronze campaign stars)
Southwest Asia Service Medal (with two bronze campaign stars)
Navy Sea Service Deployment Ribbon
Technical Service Medal, 1st Class (Republic of Vietnam)
Republic of Vietnam Gallantry Cross Unit Citation Ribbon
Republic of Vietnam Civil Actions Unit Citation Ribbon
Republic of Vietnam Campaign Medal
Kuwait Liberation Medal (Saudi Arabia)
Navy Pistol Marksmanship Badge

U.S. badges, patches and tabs
SEAL Trident
Navy Parachutist Insignia
