= Joseph Osterman =

US Marines general

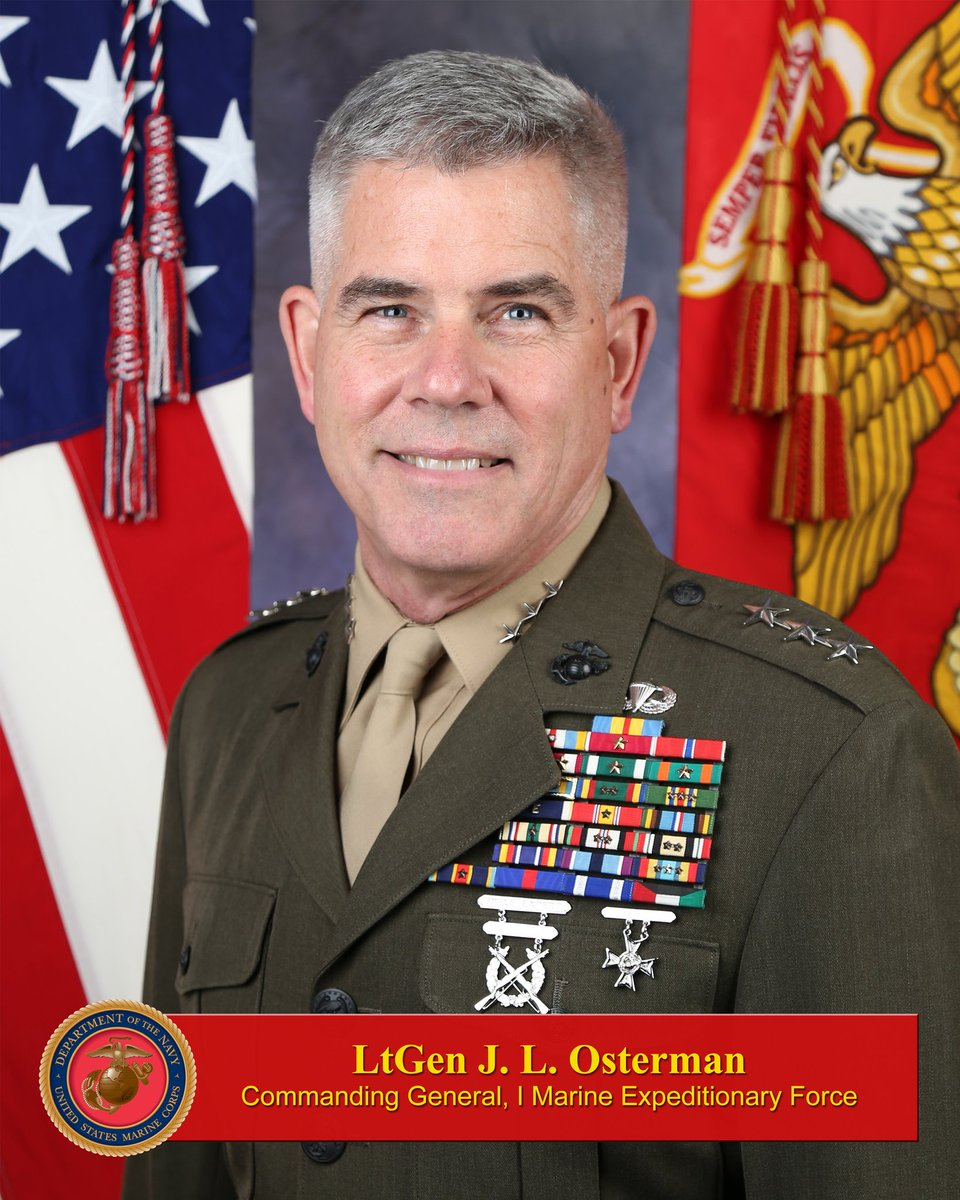
- Born: 1960 (age 65–66); Edgewater, Maryland, U.S.
- Military career
- Allegiance: United States
- Branch: United States Marine Corps
- Service years: 1982–2020
- Rank: Lieutenant General
- Commands: I Marine Expeditionary Force; Marine Corps Special Operations Command; Marine Corps Recruiting Command; 25th Marine Regiment; 1st Battalion, 3rd Marines
- Conflicts: Gulf War; Somali Civil War; War in Afghanistan; Iraq War
- Awards: Defense Distinguished Service Medal; Defense Superior Service Medal (2); Legion of Merit (2); Bronze Star Medal

Joseph L. Osterman is a retired United States Marine lieutenant general who served as the commander of the I Marine Expeditionary Force.

== Marine career ==
Osterman was commissioned in the United States Marine Corps as a second lieutenant through the Naval Reserve Officers Training Corps at the University of Colorado in 1982. He graduated from The Basic School and the Infantry Officers Course, then received assignment as rifle platoon commander and 81 mm mortar platoon commander with the 1st Battalion, 7th Marines. He then served as executive officer of the Marine Detachment aboard USS Kennedy (CV 67), then as commanding officer of the Marine Detachment aboard the USS Forrestal. He served as an operations officer with the 1st Battalion, 2nd Marines. As a lieutenant colonel, Osterman was the commanding officer of the 1st Battalion, 3rd Marines and participated in support of Operation Enduring Freedom. This was followed by a joint tour as an instructor and as the chief of staff, NATO School, Oberammergau, Germany, where he was responsible for training support to some 54 nations. Following his promotion to colonel, Osterman assumed command of the 25th Marine Regiment in 2004 and deployed to Iraq as an adviser to the Iraqi army. In June 2006 Osterman became director of the Expeditionary Warfare School, which was followed in 2008 by assignment as assistant division commander, 2nd Marine Division. In March 2010, he deployed to Afghanistan as commanding general, 1st Marine Division.

Osterman's joint assignments include the International Security Assistance Force Joint Command Deputy Chief of Staff of Operations, Afghanistan, and as Instructor and Chief of Staff at the NATO School, Oberammergau, Germany. As a brigadier general, Osterman served as commanding general of the Marine Corps Recruiting Command from 2011 to 2012. As a major general, Osterman assumed command of Marine Corps Forces Special Operations Command in August 2014 to August 2016. Upon promotion to lieutenant general, Osterman served as Deputy Commander of the United States Special Operations Command, MacDill Air Force Base, Florida. Osterman's final assignment before retirement was Commanding General, I Marine Expeditionary Force from July 2018 to 31 July 2020.

== Post-retirement ==
In June 2022, Osterman was among five senior Marine and Navy officers who were censured by Secretary of the Navy Carlos Del Toro for failing to prevent the July 2020 AAV sinking incident that killed eight marines and one navy sailor.

== Awards and decorations ==
U.S. military decorations
Defense Distinguished Service Medal
Defense Superior Service Medal with oak leaf cluster
Legion of Merit with gold award star
Bronze Star Medal
Meritorious Service Medal with two gold award stars
Navy Commendation Medal with gold award star
Navy Achievement Medal with gold award star
U.S. unit awards
Joint Meritorious Unit Award with two oak leaf clusters
Navy Unit Commendation with two bronze campaign stars
Navy Meritorious Unit Commendation with three bronze campaign stars
Navy E Ribbon
U.S. service (campaign) medals and service and training ribbons
National Defense Service Medal with bronze service star
Armed Forces Expeditionary Medal
Southwest Asia Service Medal with bronze service star
Afghanistan Campaign Medal with two bronze service stars
Iraq Campaign Medal with two bronze service stars
Global War on Terrorism Service Medal
Humanitarian Service Medal
Sea Service Deployment Ribbon with seven bronze campaign stars
Navy and Marine Corps Overseas Service Ribbon with bronze campaign stars
Marine Corps Recruiting Service Ribbon
NATO Medal for service with the International Security Assistance Force (Afghanistan)
Kuwait Liberation Medal (Kuwait)

U.S. badges, patches and tabs
Army Parachutist Badge
Rifle Expert Badge
Pistol Sharpshooter Badge
Office of the Joint Chiefs of Staff Identification Badge

Military offices
Preceded by Mark A. Clark	Commanding General of the United States Marine Forces Special Operations Command; 2014–2016	Succeeded by Carl E. Mundy III
Preceded by Sean A. Pybus	Deputy Commander of the United States Special Operations Command; 2016–2018	Succeeded by Timothy G. Szymanski
