= Shawn R. Satterfield =

US Army general officer

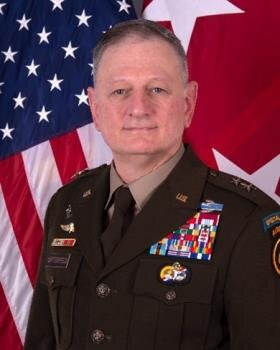
- Official portrait
- Born: c. 1969 (age 56–57)
- Military career
- Allegiance: United States
- Branch: United States Army
- Service years: 1986–present
- Rank: Major General
- Commands: 20th Special Forces Group
- Conflicts: Operation Enduring Freedom; Operation Inherent Resolve; Operation Iraqi Freedom

Shawn R. Satterfield (born c. 1969) is a United States Army major general who serves as the Deputy Commander for Mobilization and Reserve Affairs, Vice Director of Strategy and Policy (VJ5), and Provisional Director of Force Development and Design (J7(P)) at Headquarters, United States Special Operations Command (USSOCOM) at MacDill AFB, Florida. He previously served as Commander of Special Operations Command North (SOCNORTH), Commander of the 20th Special Forces Group (20th SFG), and Commander of Special Operations Detachment – Central (SODCENT).

Satterfield enlisted in the Missouri Army National Guard at the age of 17, graduating from Army Basic Combat Training before his senior year of high school. Subsequently, he would attend and graduate from Army military police training after high school.

In 1991, Satterfield obtained a commission as an Infantry Officer from the Missouri Army National Guard Officer Leadership Program via officer candidate school at Southern Missouri State University and graduated with a degree in criminal justice. In 1993, he graduated from the U.S. Army Special Forces Qualification Course, learning Egyptian Arabic and served with the 20th Special Forces Group. Simultaneously, he also served as a Highway Patrol officer in Crawford County, Missouri.

Satterfield deployed twice to Afghanistan, once to Colombia, once to Kosovo, and once to Iraq.
