= Bryan P. Fenton =

United States Army general

Bryan Fenton
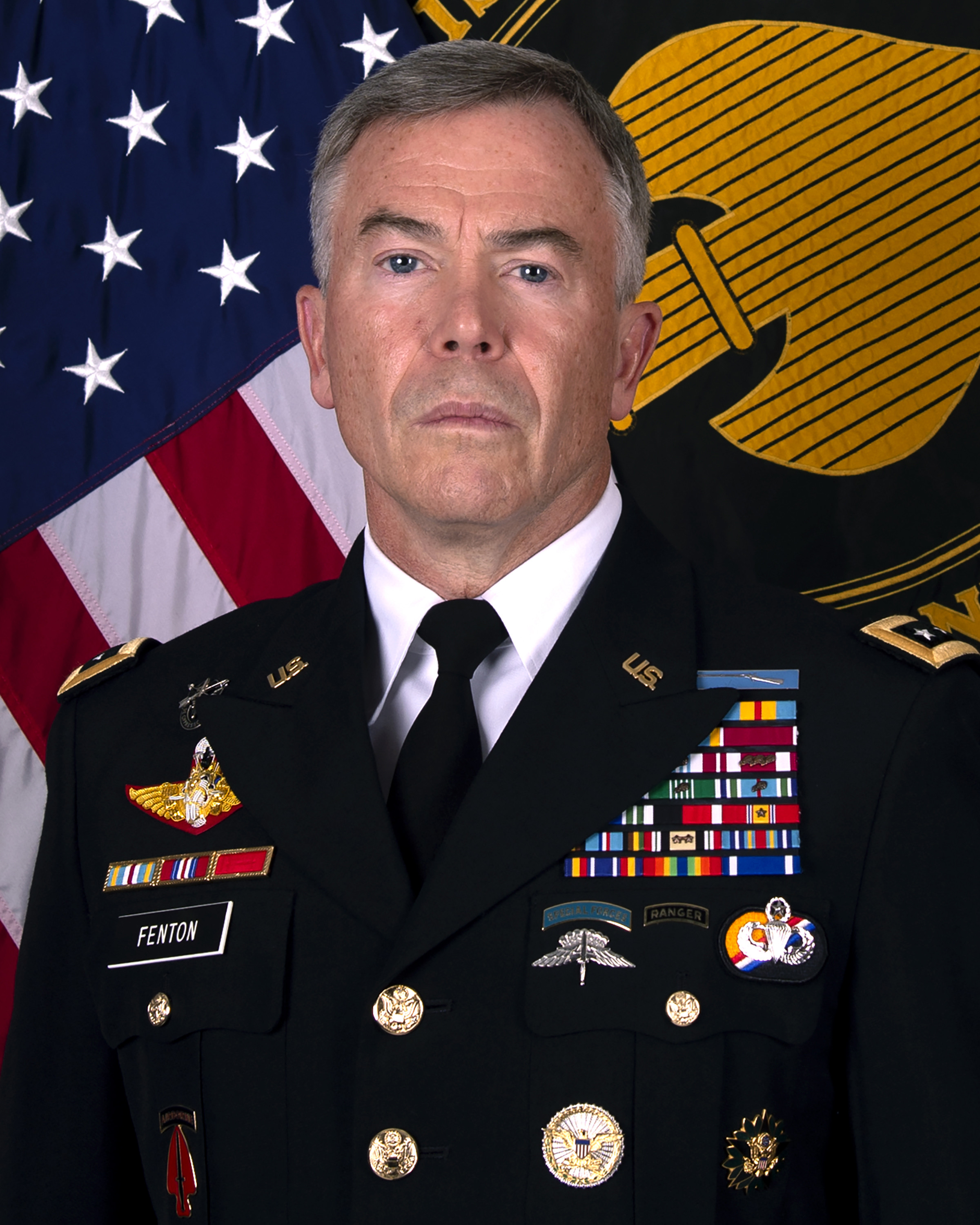
- Official portrait, 2023
- Born: Bryan Patrick Fenton; 1965 (age 60–61); New Orleans, Louisiana, U.S.
- Allegiance: United States
- Branch: United States Army
- Service years: 1987–2025
- Rank: General
- Commands: United States Special Operations Command; Joint Special Operations Command; Special Operations Command Pacific
- Conflicts: War in Afghanistan; Iraq War
- Awards: Defense Distinguished Service Medal; Defense Superior Service Medal; Legion of Merit (2); Bronze Star (3)
- Education: University of Notre Dame (BBA) United States Army Command and General Staff College (MA)
- Bryan P. Fenton's voice Fenton's opening statement at his confirmation hearing to be commander of U.S. Special Operations Command; Recorded 21 July 2022

Bryan P. Fenton (born 1965) is a United States Army general who served as the 13th commander of the United States Special Operations Command (SOCOM) at MacDill Air Force Base in Florida, from 30 August 2022 until 3 October 2025. Earlier, he had served as the 16th commander of the Joint Special Operations Command (JSOC) at Fort Bragg in North Carolina, from July 2021 to August 2022, and as a senior military assistant to two Secretaries of Defense, from 12 August 2019 to June 2021. He had previously served as the deputy commander of United States Indo-Pacific Command. Fenton is a graduate of the University of Notre Dame.

Fenton relinquished command of SOCOM to Navy Adm. Frank M. Bradley at a change of command ceremony in Tampa, Florida, on 3 October 2025, on the eve of his retirement.

== Personal life ==
Bryan Patrick Fenton was born in 1965 in New Orleans, Louisiana. He is married with two daughters.

== Awards and decorations ==
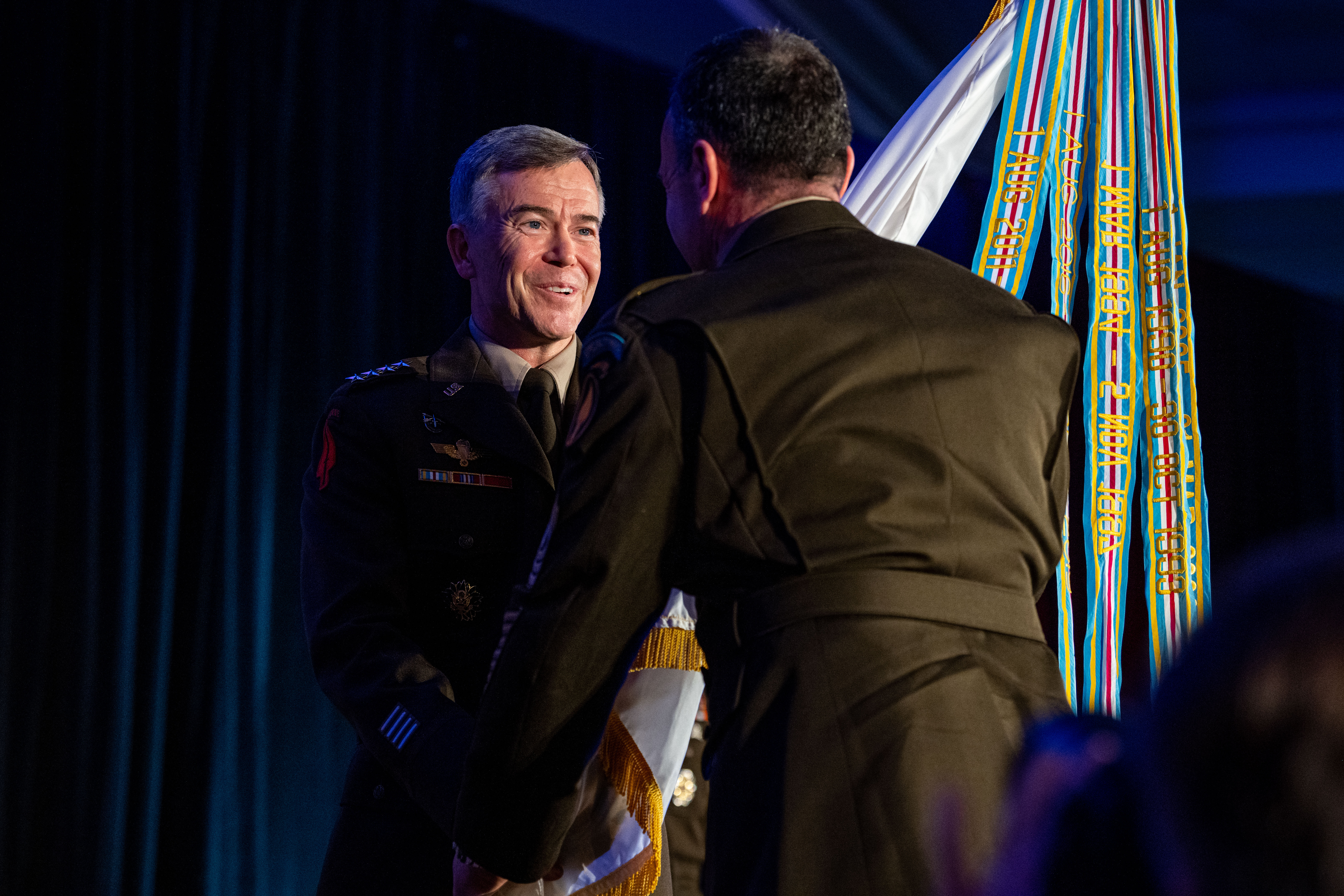
Gen. Fenton accepts the USSOCOM command guidon from Command Sgt. Maj. Shane W. Shorter on 30 August 2022

Expert Infantryman Badge
Special Forces Tab
Ranger tab
Military Free Fall Parachutist Badge
Master Parachutist Badge
Army Staff Identification Badge
Office of the Secretary of Defense Identification Badge
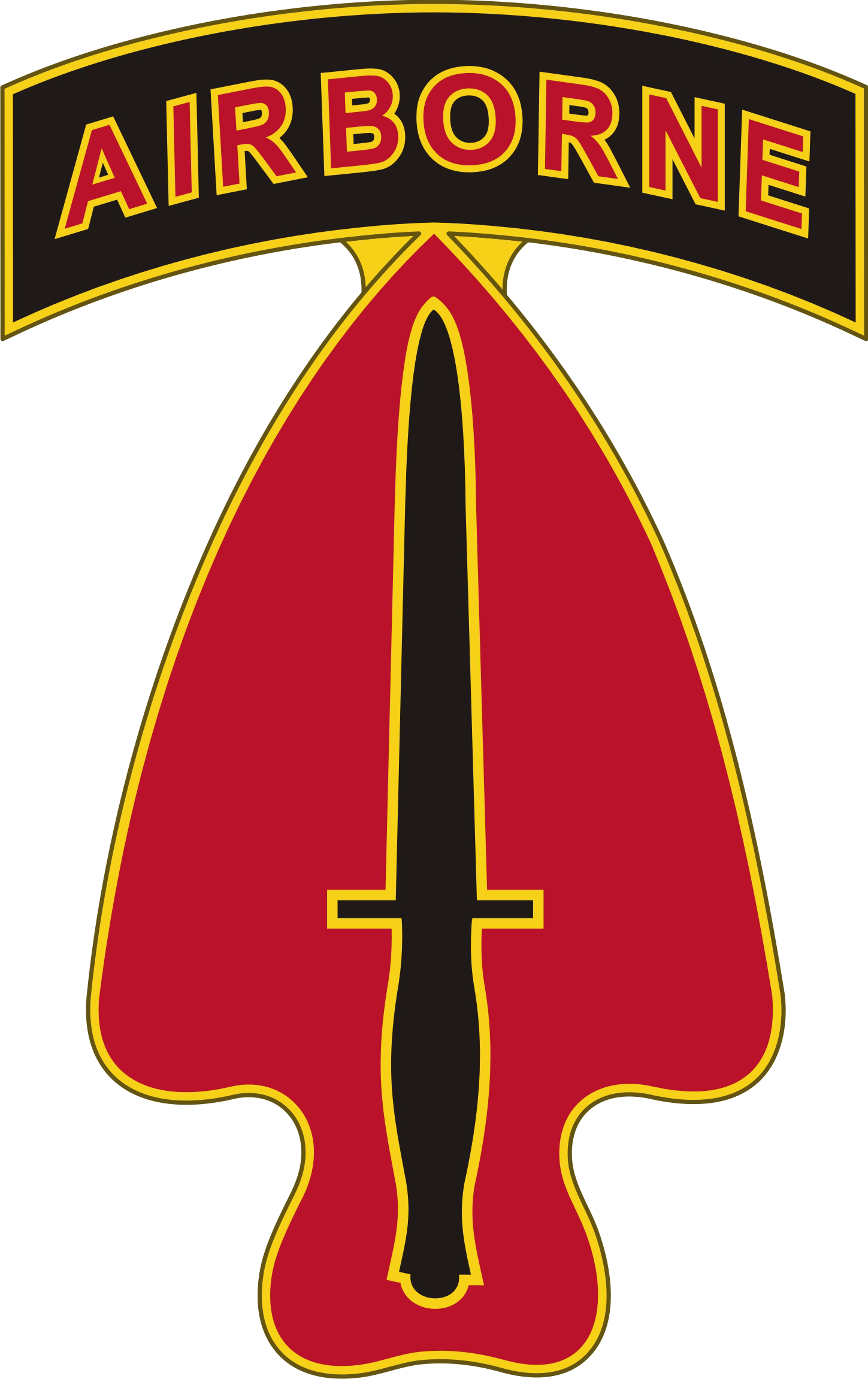
United States Army Special Operations Command CSIB
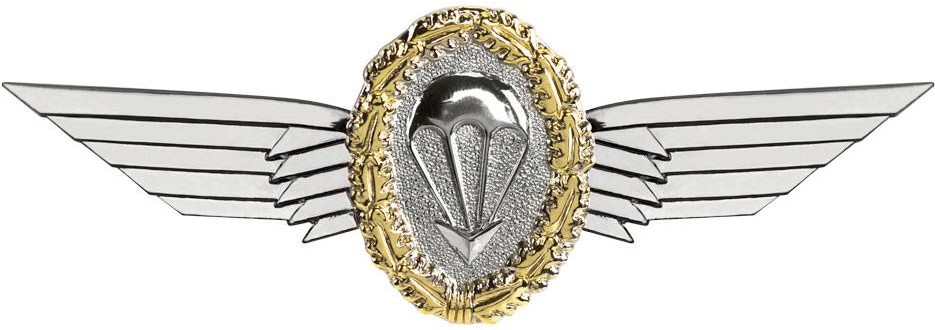
Silver German Parachutist Badge
Ecuadorian Parachutist Badge
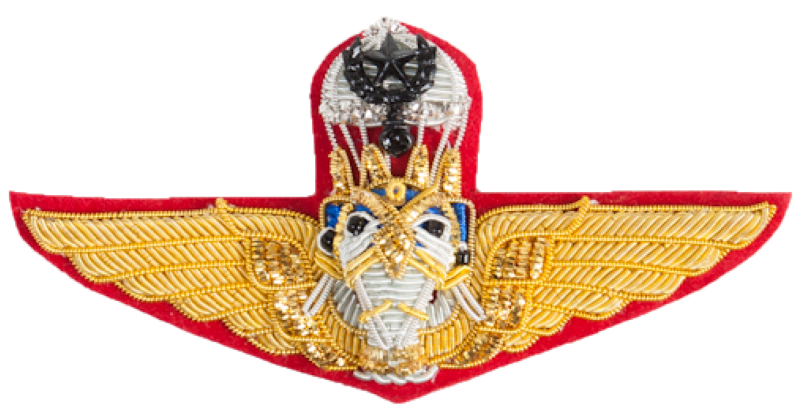
Royal Thai Army Master Parachutist Badge
1st Special Forces Command Distinctive Unit Insignia
4 Overseas Service Bars

Defense Distinguished Service Medal
Defense Superior Service Medal
Legion of Merit with one bronze oak leaf cluster
Bronze Star Medal with two oak leaf clusters
Defense Meritorious Service Medal with oak leaf cluster
Meritorious Service Medal with three oak leaf clusters
Joint Service Commendation Medal
Army Commendation Medal
Joint Service Achievement Medal with oak leaf cluster
Army Achievement Medal with two oak leaf clusters
Joint Meritorious Unit Award
Valorous Unit Award
Meritorious Unit Commendation
Army of Occupation Medal
National Defense Service Medal with one bronze service star
Armed Forces Expeditionary Medal
Afghanistan Campaign Medal with service star
Iraq Campaign Medal with two service stars
Global War on Terrorism Expeditionary Medal
Global War on Terrorism Service Medal
Army Service Ribbon
NATO Medal for the former Yugoslavia

Military offices
Preceded by Colin J. Kilrain	Commander of the Special Operations Command Pacific; 2016–2017	Succeeded by Daniel D. Yoo
Preceded by George W. Smith Jr.	Senior Military Assistant to the Secretary of Defense; 2019–2021	Succeeded by Randy A. George
Preceded by Scott A. Howell	Commander of the Joint Special Operations Command; 2021–2022	Succeeded by Frank M. Bradley
Preceded by Richard D. Clarke	Commander of the United States Special Operations Command; 2022–2025	Succeeded by Frank M. Bradley
U.S. order of precedence (ceremonial)
Preceded by Michael E. Langley as Commander of U.S. Africa Command	Order of precedence of the United States as Commander of U.S. Special Operations Command	Succeeded by Anthony J. Cotton as Commander of U.S. Strategic Command
