= P. Gardner Howe III =

United States admiral (born 1962)

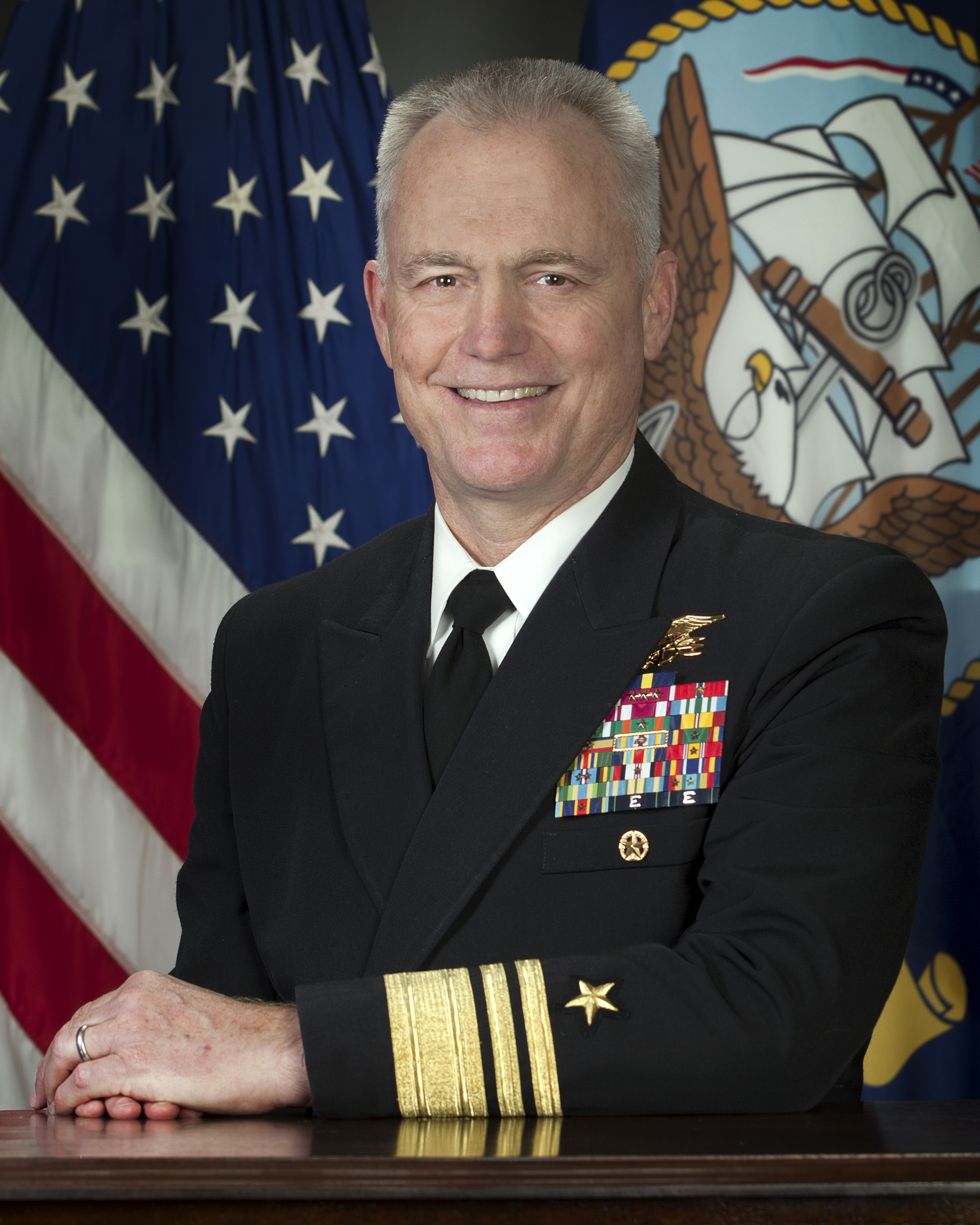
- Howe in 2016

Associate Director for Military Affairs at the Central Intelligence Agency
- In office 4 October 2016 – 2019
- President: Donald Trump

55th President of the Naval War College
- In office 8 July 2014 – 25 July 2016
- Preceded by: Walter E. Carter Jr.
- Succeeded by: Jeffrey A. Harley

Personal details
- Born: 1962 (age 63–64) Jacksonville, Florida
- Military career
- Allegiance: United States of America
- Branch: United States Navy
- Service years: 1984–2019
- Rank: Vice admiral
- Commands: U.S. Naval War College; Special Operations Command Pacific; Naval Special Warfare Group 3; Naval Special Warfare Unit 3
- Conflicts: Operation Earnest Will; Operation Provide Promise; Operation Enduring Freedom; Operation Iraqi Freedom

Philip Gardner Howe III is a retired United States Navy vice admiral and Navy SEAL. His assignment prior to retirement in 2019 was associate director for military affairs at the Central Intelligence Agency. He previously served as the 55th President of the Naval War College, and was the first SEAL officer to hold this assignment. Prior to that, Howe was the Commander, Special Operations Command Pacific.

== Military career ==
Howe was a commissioned as an Ensign following his graduation from the United States Naval Academy in 1984. Howe then received orders to Basic Underwater Demolition/SEAL training (BUD/S) at Naval Amphibious Base Coronado. After six months of training, Howe graduated with BUD/S class 131 in February 1985. Following SEAL Tactical Training and completion of six month probationary period, he received the 1130 designator as a Naval Special Warfare Officer, entitled to wear the Special Warfare insignia. He has held many positions within the Naval Special Warfare and Joint Special Operations Command JSOC communities. Howe has commanded Naval Special Warfare Unit THREE (NSWU-3) in Bahrain, Naval Special Warfare Group 3 in San Diego, and Special Operations Command Pacific. His overseas deployments have been in support of Operations Earnest Will, Provide Promise, Enduring Freedom, and Iraqi Freedom as well as others across Asia and the western Pacific region.

Howe's major joint and staff assignments include current operations officer at Special Operations Command Pacific; chief staff officer, Naval Special Warfare Development Group; assistant chief of staff for Operations, Plans and Policy at Naval Special Warfare Command; director of Legislative Affairs for Special Operations Command; and assistant commanding officer, operations Joint Special Operations Command. Howe most recently served as the Commander, Special Operations Command Pacific from 2013 to 2014.

On 8 July 2014, Howe became the 55th President of the Naval War College. Howe became associate director for military affairs at the Central Intelligence Agency on 4 October 2016. Howe retired to Newport, RI at the end of 2019 and currently serves on the Navy SEAL Foundation board of advisors.

== Education ==
Howe is a 1984 graduate of the United States Naval Academy. He graduated from the Naval Postgraduate School in 1995 with a Master of Arts in national security affairs, and from the National War College in 2002 with a Master of Arts in national security. Howe enrolled as a student at the International Yacht Restoration School of Technology and Trades in Newport, RI for the 2020–2021 academic year.

== Awards and decorations ==
=== Military awards and badges ===
Ribbon	Description	Notes
	Navy Distinguished Service Medal	
Ribbon of the DSSM	Defense Superior Service Medal	
	Legion of Merit	with three gold award stars
	Bronze Star Medal	with one award star
	Defense Meritorious Service Medal	
Ribbon of the MSM	Meritorious Service Medal	
	Joint Service Commendation Medal	
	Navy and Marine Corps Commendation Medal	with two award stars
	Navy and Marine Corps Achievement Medal	with one award star
	Combat Action Ribbon	
	Navy Presidential Unit Citation	with two bronze service stars
	Joint Meritorious Unit Award	with one bronze oak leaf cluster
	Navy Unit Commendation Ribbon	with one service star
	Navy Meritorious Unit Commendation Ribbon	
FMF Ribbon	Fleet Marine Force Ribbon	
	National Defense Service Medal	with one bronze service star
	Armed Forces Expeditionary Medal	with two service stars
	Afghanistan Campaign Medal	with one service star
Ribbon of the GWTSM	Global War on Terrorism Service Medal	
	Armed Forces Service Medal	
	Military Outstanding Volunteer Service Medal	
	Navy Sea Service Deployment Ribbon	with one silver and one bronze service stars
	Navy Overseas Service Ribbon	with one bronze star
	Navy Expert Rifleman Medal	
	Navy Expert Pistol Shot Medal	

Badge	Description
	Navy Special Warfare Insignia
	Naval Parachutist Insignia
	Command at Sea insignia

=== Other awards ===
- Service Member Defense of Freedom Award

Military offices
Preceded by Walter E. Carter Jr.	55th President of the Naval War College; 2014 – 2016	Succeeded by Jeffrey A. Harley
