= Sean A. Pybus =

Retired US Navy admiral (born 1957)

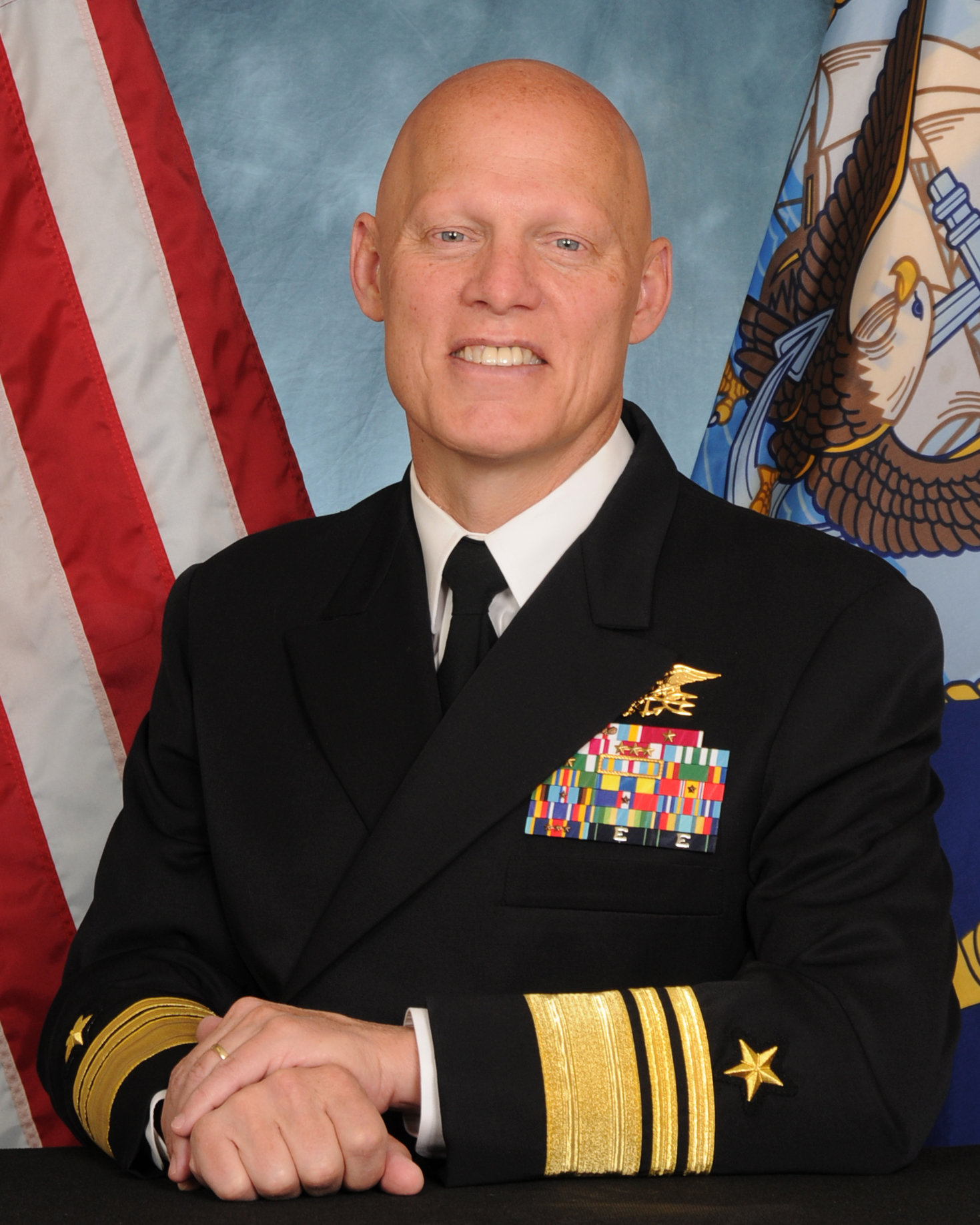
- Vice Admiral Sean Averell Pybus
- Born: September 22, 1957 (age 69)
- Military career
- Allegiance: United States
- Branch: United States Navy
- Service years: 1979–2016
- Rank: Vice Admiral
- Commands: NATO Special Operations Headquarters; Naval Special Warfare Command; Special Operations Command Pacific; Naval Special Warfare Group 1
- Awards: Defense Distinguished Service Medal; Navy Distinguished Service Medal; Defense Superior Service Medal (3); Legion of Merit (2)

Sean Averell Pybus (born September 22, 1957) is a retired United States Navy vice admiral who last served as the deputy Commander, United States Special Operations Command from 2014 to 2016. He previously served as the Commander, Naval Special Warfare Command from 2011 to 2013.

== Military career ==
Pybus graduated from University of Rochester in 1979 and was commissioned through the Navy Reserve Officers Training Corps. After his commission as an ensign in the United States Navy, he reported to Basic Underwater Demolition/Sea, Air, Land training in Coronado, California. He graduated with BUD/S class 105 in December 1979. Following SEAL Tactical Training and completion of his six month probationary period, he received the 1130 designator as a Naval Special Warfare Officer, entitled to wear the Special Warfare insignia. He has served operationally in an Underwater Demolition Team, SEAL Team, SEAL Delivery Vehicle Team and Special Boat Team. As a platoon commander, Pybus completed a deployment to the Philippines. In 1984, Pybus was assigned to SEAL Team Six and completed a specialized selection and training course. Pybus went on to serve as Assault Squadron Commander during the Achille Lauro hijacking.

Pybus has participated in several classified contingency operations and has served as a SEAL platoon commander, joint special operations staff officer and executive officer of SEAL Team TWO. His overseas assignments include service in Latin America, Europe, Africa and Asia. Pybus earned a Master of Arts degree in Strategic Studies at the Naval War College in 1998. He served command tours of Naval Special Warfare Unit 2 in Germany and Commodore of Naval Special Warfare Group 1 from July 2005 to Jun 2007. Pybus was promoted to rear admiral in 2007 and subsequently served as Director of Operations, J-3, United States Special Operations Command (USSOCOM) from 2007 to 2009, followed by assignment to Camp H.M. Smith, Hawaii, as Commander, Special Operations Command Pacific from 2009 to 2011. Pybus became Commander, Naval Special Warfare Command in Coronado, California, from 2011 to 2013. In 2013 he was promoted to vice admiral and assigned to NATO Special Operations Headquarters in Mons, Belgium. His last position before retirement was as deputy commander, USSOCOM, at MacDill Air Force Base, Florida, from 2014 to 2016.

=== Awards and decorations ===
U.S. military decorations
| Defense Distinguished Service Medal |
| Navy Distinguished Service Medal |
| Defense Superior Service Medal (three awards) |
| Legion of Merit (two awards) |
| Defense Meritorious Service Medal (three awards) |
| Meritorious Service Medal (four awards) |
| Joint Service Commendation |
| Navy and Marine Corps Commendation Medal |
| Joint Meritorious Unit Award |
| Navy Unit Commendation |
| Navy Meritorious Unit Commendation |
| Navy Expeditionary Medal |
U.S. Service (Campaign) Medals and Service and Training Ribbons
| National Defense Service Medal (with bronze campaign stars) |
| Armed Forces Expeditionary Medal (with bronze campaign stars) |
| Kosovo Campaign Medal with bronze service star |
| Global War on Terrorism Expeditionary Medal |
| Global War on Terrorism Service Medal |
| Armed Forces Service Medal |
| Navy Sea Service Deployment Ribbon |
| Navy and Marine Corps Overseas Service Ribbon with three bronze service stars |
| Navy Rifle Marksmanship Badge |
| Navy Pistol Marksmanship Badge |

U.S. badges, patches and tabs
| SEAL Trident |
| Navy and Marine Corps Parachutist Insignia |
| United States Special Operations Command Badge |

Military offices
| Preceded by ??? | Deputy Commander of the United States Special Operations Command; 2014–2016 | Succeeded by Joseph Osterman |
