= Charles R. Holland =

United States Air Force general

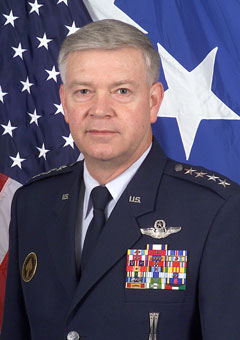
- Born: January 21, 1946 (age 80); Elkins, West Virginia, U.S.
- Military career
- Allegiance: United States
- Branch: United States Air Force
- Service years: 1968–2003
- Rank: General
- Commands: United States Special Operations Command; Air Force Special Operations Command; Special Operations Command Pacific; 1st Special Operations Wing; 21st Tactical Airlift Squadron
- Conflicts: Vietnam War; Gulf War
- Awards: Air Force Distinguished Service Medal; Defense Superior Service Medal (3); Legion of Merit (2); Distinguished Flying Cross

Charles R. Holland (born January 21, 1946) is a retired United States Air Force general who served as the commander of United States Special Operations Command (USSOCOM) at MacDill Air Force Base, Florida. As commander, he was responsible for all special operations forces across every branch in the U.S. Armed Forces. Currently, Holland is the first and the only member of the U.S. Air Force to serve as commander of USSOCOM, and the only SOCOM commander without the experience as a special operator.

== Military career ==
Holland entered the United States Air Force in 1968 after graduating from the United States Air Force Academy. His early commands over his career included a squadron and two wings. He flew more than 100 combat missions, including 79 in an AC-130 Gunship in Southeast Asia. He served as Deputy Commanding General of the Joint Special Operations Command, was Commander of the Special Operations Command, Pacific, commanded the Air Force Special Operations Command at Hurlburt Field, Florida, and was the Vice Commander of U.S. Air Forces in Europe at Ramstein Air Base, Germany. His final assignment was commanding USSOCOM at MacDill. He retired November 1, 2003.

== Education ==
- 1968 Bachelor of Science degree in aeronautical engineering, United States Air Force Academy, Colorado Springs, Colorado
- 1974 Squadron Officer School, Maxwell AFB, Alabama
- 1975 Air Command and Staff College, by correspondence
- 1976 Master of Science degree in business management, Troy State University, Ramstein AB, West Germany
- 1978 Master of Science degree in astronautical engineering, Air Force Institute of Technology, Wright-Patterson AFB, Ohio
- 1982 National Security Management Course, by correspondence
- 1986 Industrial College of the Armed Forces, Fort Lesley J. McNair, Washington, D.C.
- 1990 Program for Senior Officials in National Security, John F. Kennedy School of Government, Harvard University, Cambridge, Massachusetts
- 1998 National and International Security Management Program, John F. Kennedy School of Government, Harvard University, Cambridge, Massachusetts

== Assignments ==
1. August 1968 – August 1969, student, undergraduate pilot training, Reese AFB, Texas
2. September 1969 – November 1969, student, initial C-130E pilot qualification training, Sewart AFB, Tennessee
3. November 1969 – September 1972, C-130E pilot, 347th and 772nd tactical airlift squadrons, Dyess AFB, Texas
4. October 1972 – January 1973, student, AC-130E combat crew training, Hurlburt Field, Florida
5. January 1973 – January 1974, AC-130E/H aircraft commander, instructor pilot, and standardization and evaluation pilot, 16th Special Operations Squadron, Ubon Royal Thai AFB, Thailand
6. February 1974 – January 1976, Air Operations Staff Officer, Directorate of Airlift, Headquarters U.S. Air Forces in Europe, Ramstein AB, West Germany
7. January 1976 – April 1977, Joint Training Exercise Plans Officer, Military Airlift Center Europe, Ramstein AB, West Germany
8. May 1977 – December 1978, astronautical engineering graduate student, Air Force Institute of Technology, Wright-Patterson AFB, Ohio
9. January 1979 – May 1983, Chief, Space Shuttle Flight Operations Branch, later, Deputy Director for Policy Planning, later, Executive to the Commander, Space Division, Los Angeles Air Force Station, California
10. June 1983 – August 1983, student, C-130E requalification course, Little Rock AFB, Arkansas
11. September 1983 – June 1985, Commander, 21st Tactical Airlift Squadron, Clark AB, Philippines
12. July 1985 – June 1986, student, Industrial College of the Armed Forces, Fort Lesley J. McNair, Washington, D.C.
13. June 1986 – June 1987, Deputy Chief, Airlift and Training Division, Directorate of Operational Requirements, Deputy Chief of Staff for Research, Development and Acquisition, Headquarters U.S. Air Force, Washington, D.C.
14. June 1987 – June 1988, Chief, Airlift and Training Division, Directorate of Strategic, Special Operations Forces and Airlift, Military Deputy for Acquisition, Office of the Assistant Secretary of the Air Force, Washington, D.C.
15. June 1988 – June 1991, Vice Commander, later, Commander, 1550th Combat Crew Training Wing, Kirtland AFB, New Mexico
16. June 1991 – June 1993, Commander, 1st Special Operations Wing, Hurlburt Field, Florida
17. June 1993 – June 1995, Deputy Commanding General, Joint Special Operations Command, Fort Bragg, North Carolina
18. June 1995 – June 1997, Commander, Special Operations Command, Pacific at Camp H.M. Smith, Hawaii
19. July 1997 – August 1999, Commander, Air Force Special Operations Command, Hurlburt Field, Florida
20. August 1999 – October 2000, Vice Commander, U.S. Air Forces in Europe, Ramstein AB, Germany
21. October 2000 – October 2003, Commander, Headquarters U.S. Special Operations Command, MacDill AFB, Florida

== Flight Information ==
- Rating: Command Pilot
- Flight hours: More than 5,000 flying hours
- Aircraft flown: C-130, C-37, AC-130, HC-130, MC-130, MH-53, MH-60, H-3, H-1, T-39

== Awards and decorations ==
Personal decorations
	Air Force Distinguished Service Medal
	Defense Superior Service Medal with two bronze oak leaf clusters
Width-44 crimson ribbon with a pair of width-2 white stripes on the edges	Legion of Merit with bronze oak leaf cluster
	Distinguished Flying Cross
Width-44 crimson ribbon with two width-8 white stripes at distance 4 from the edges.	Meritorious Service Medal with two bronze oak leaf clusters
	Air Medal with four bronze oak leaf clusters
Unit awards
	Joint Meritorious Unit Award with bronze oak leaf cluster
	Air Force Outstanding Unit Award with Valor device and bronze oak leaf cluster
	Air Force Organizational Excellence Award with two bronze oak leaf clusters
Service awards
	Combat Readiness Medal
Campaign and service medals
Width=44 scarlet ribbon with a central width-4 golden yellow stripe, flanked by pairs of width-1 scarlet, white, Old Glory blue, and white stripes	National Defense Service Medal with two bronze service stars
	Armed Forces Expeditionary Medal with service star
	Vietnam Service Medal
	Southwest Asia Service Medal with service star
Service, training, and marksmanship awards
	Air Force Overseas Short Tour Service Ribbon
	Air Force Overseas Long Tour Service Ribbon with two bronze oak leaf clusters
	Air Force Longevity Service Award with silver oak leaf cluster and two bronze oak leaf clusters
	Small Arms Expert Marksmanship Ribbon
	Air Force Training Ribbon
Foreign awards
	Vietnam Gallantry Cross Unit Award
	Vietnam Campaign Medal
	Kuwait Liberation Medal (Kuwait)

Other accoutrements
US Air Force Command Pilot Badge
Basic Missile Maintenance Badge
United States Special Operations Command Badge

== Effective dates of promotion ==
Promotions
Insignia	Rank	Date
	General	December 1, 2000
	Lieutenant General	November 1, 1999
	Major General	February 22, 1997
	Brigadier General	May 20, 1993
	Colonel	December 1, 1985
	Lieutenant Colonel	December 1, 1982
	Major	April 19, 1979
	Captain	June 5, 1971
	First Lieutenant	December 5, 1969
	Second Lieutenant	June 5, 1968
