= 820th Base Defense Group =

Force protection unit of the United States Air Force

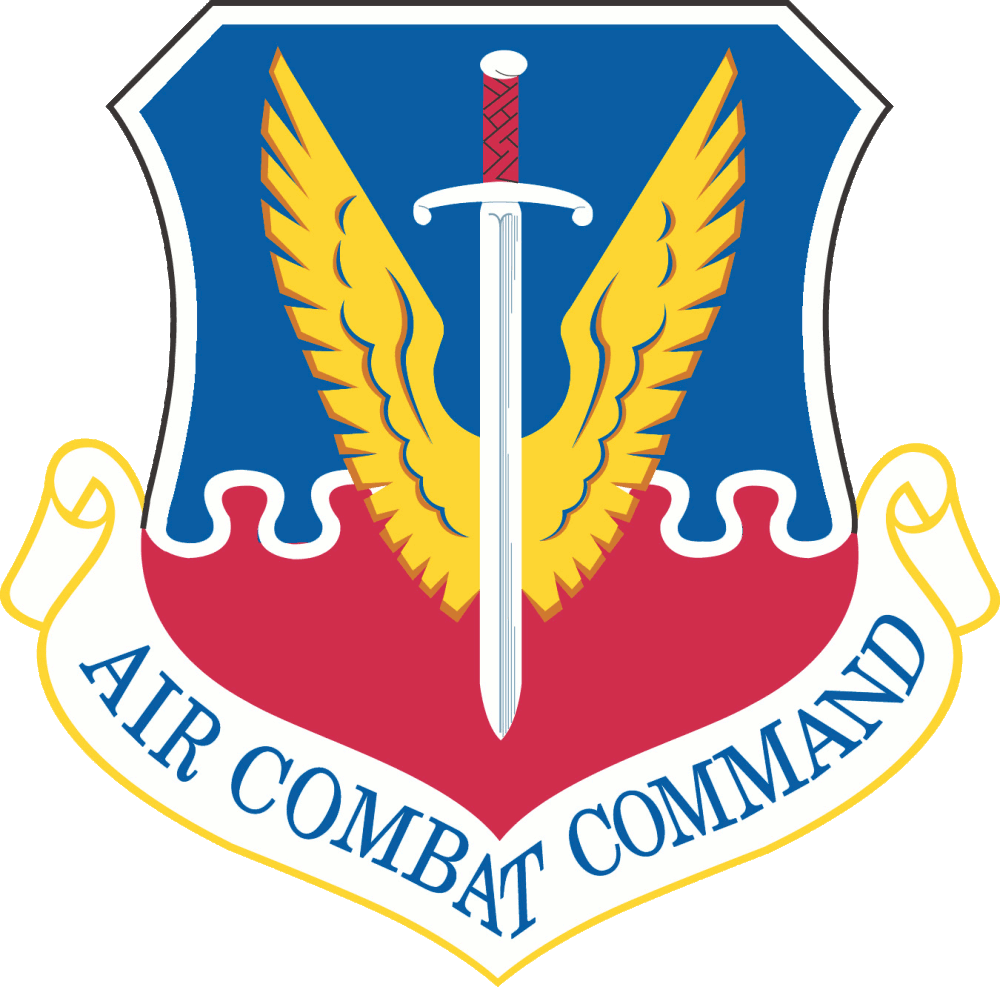
820th Base Defense Group

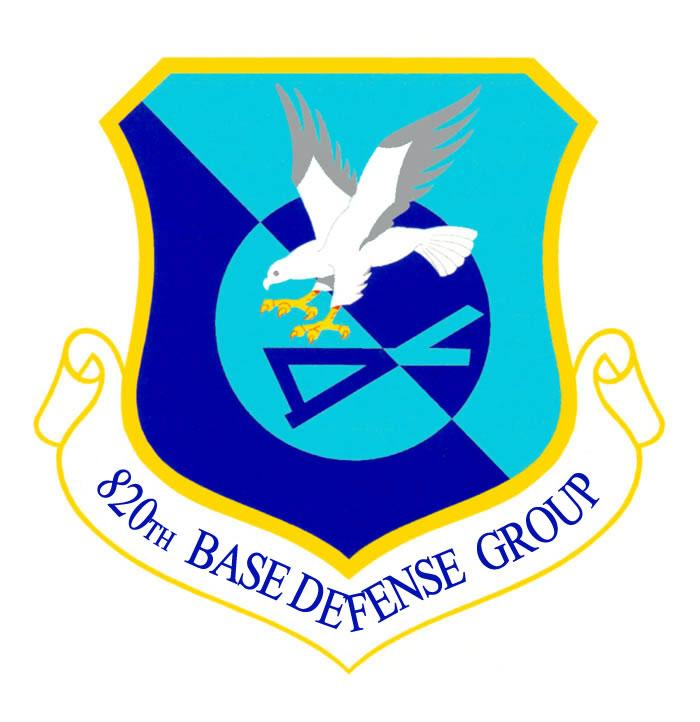
- 820th Base Defense Group emblem
- Active: 1968–1969; 1997–present
- Country: United States
- Branch: United States Air Force
- Type: Air force infantry
- Part of: Air Combat Command; 93d Air-Ground Operations Wing
- Garrison/HQ: Moody Air Force Base, Georgia
- Motto: Joined to fight
- Engagements: War in Afghanistan; Iraq War

Commanders
- Current commander: Colonel Megan Hall
- Notable commanders: Colonel John Decknick, Colonel "TR" Derry, Colonel Paul Kasuda, Colonel Michael Ross, Colonel Benito Barron

The 820th Base Defense Group is the United States Air Force's first-in base defense capability currently based at Moody Air Force Base, Georgia. The group consists of approximately 800 personnel and was reactivated in 1997. It is composed of three rapidly-deployable Base Defense Squadrons (822nd "Safeside", 823rd "Jesters", 824th "Ghostwalkers"), and the 820th Combat Operations Squadron ("Reapers"). Each multifunctional squadron contains security forces, intelligence, explosive ordinance disposal technicians, engineering, communications, medical, logistics, and administrative personnel who can operate with limited support from other deployed forces as part of the Department of Defense's Immediate Response Force. Currently, the 820th is assigned to Air Combat Command. The unit is trained and equipped for offensive, defensive, and administrative operations. They are able to perform joint forcible entry (airborne insertion and air assault operations) and ranger, jungle, arctic, and mountain operations, as well as base, area, and mobile defense. The unit is also able to perform airfield security assessments and C2 of defense forces for one large base or several small sites. Additionally, the squadrons can link with other integrated defense or initial entry/base seizure forces and provide a secure and smooth transition to airfield opening forces.

== History ==
The group traces its origins to the 1041st USAF Security Police Squadron (Test) formed at Schofield Barracks, Hawaii, designated by the code name "Operation Safeside".

Since its reactivation in 1997, the 820 BDG has deployed in support of Operations Desert Safeside, Southern Watch, Iraqi Freedom, Enduring Freedom, Inherent Resolve, Bright Star, Operation Resolute Support, Operation Freedom's Sentinel, Operation Juniper Shield, Operation Juniper Micron, and Operation Spartan Shield. It has deployed to locations such as Iraq, Djibouti, Egypt, Kuwait, Oman, Afghanistan, Kyrgyzstan, Uzbekistan, Türkiye, Pakistan, Saudi Arabia, Niger, and Kenya.

The group also deployed in a humanitarian assistance role to New Orleans after Hurricane Katrina. Fifty members of the 820 BDG/823 BDS deployed to Port-au-Prince in response to the 2010 Haiti earthquake to assist with security and humanitarian efforts.

In August 2009, it was announced that Airmen from the New York Air National Guard's 105th Security Forces Squadron atm Stewart Air National Guard Base would support the 820th with manpower for their deployments. Since then, Airmen from the 105th Base Defense Squadron have integrated with the 820th Jersey; Westover Air Reserve Base, Massachusetts; and Vandenberg Air Force Base, California. These flights came together to form a squadron when the headquarters teams deployed for contingencies. In addition to security forces, the unit also had personnel from the United States Air Force Office of Special Investigations, civil engineering, logistics and supply, communications, intelligence, administration, personnel, and the medical career fields, establishing the first multi-functional air base defense force in the Air Force. From March 1997, the group and its seven geographically separated flights trained and became operational.

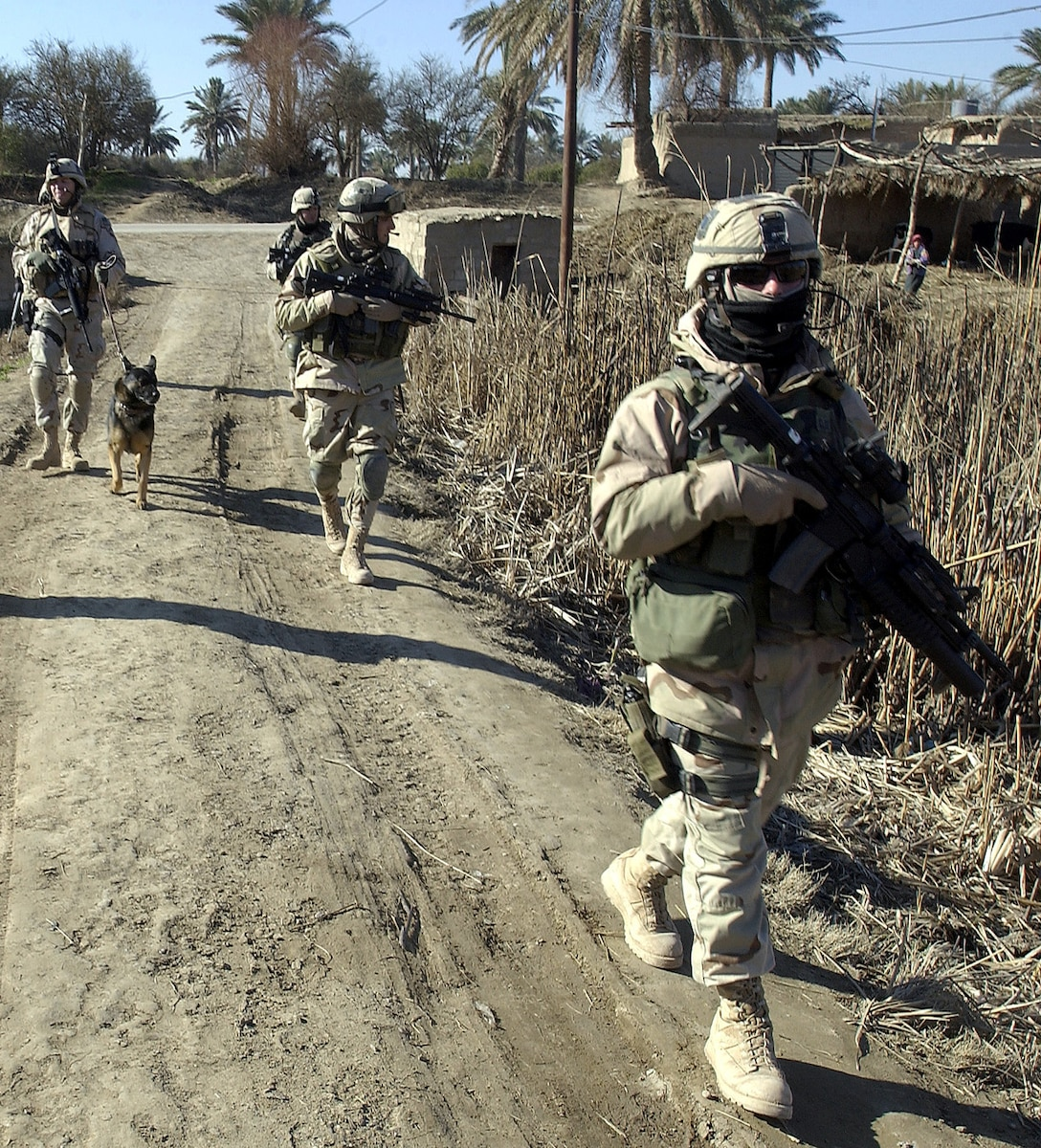
Airmen of Task Force 1041 patrol the area near Balad Air Base

On 1 August 1999, Detachment 1 of the group activated at Moody Air Force Base, Georgia to plan and execute relocation from Lackland Air Force Base and to constitute three new security forces squadrons. On 14 March 2001, the official activation of the new group occurred at Moody Air Force Base under Air Combat Command as a direct reporting unit. On 18 August 2006, it was assigned to the 347th Rescue Wing. On 31 October 2006, it was reassigned to the 23rd Wing where it remained until 25 January 2008. On that date, it was reassigned to the 93rd Air-Ground Operations Wing.

Since its reactivation in 1997, the 820th has deployed to Bahrain, Kuwait, Qatar, Djibouti, Albania, Uzbekistan, Pakistan, Kyrgyzstan, Afghanistan, Iraq, Jordan, Oman, Türkiye, Saudi Arabia, Niger, and Kenya in support of Operations Desert Thunder, Desert Fox, Southern Watch, Shining Hope, Enduring Freedom, Iraqi Freedom, Inherent Resolve, Resolute Support, Freedom's Sentinel, Juniper Shield, and Spartan Shield.

In January 2005, the 823rd Squadron joined Task Force 1041 to lead Operation Desert Safeside, a 60-day combat operation to kill or capture insurgents attacking Balad Air Base, Iraq. TF-1041's designated area of operations was an area with high levels of insurgent activity, roughly 10 kilometers wide and 6 kilometers deep, from the Balad perimeter fence to the Tigris River. During the operation, they captured 17 insurgents considered by the United States to be "high-value targets" as well as 98 other insurgents. They also captured eight major weapons caches. TF-1041 sustained no injuries. According to Air Force sources, the operation reduced insurgent attacks in the area.

In May 2007, the group would constitute the core of the 887th Expeditionary Security Forces Squadron at Camp Bucca, Iraq. The 887th provided counterinsurgency, detainee operations, and intelligence, surveillance and reconnaissance (ISR) support by conducting area security and mobility support within the forward operating base's joint security area. During that time, the squadron conducted more than 6,500 outside-the-wire patrols, covering more than 100,000 miles of roads as well as 1,500 Raven-B and 200 Scan Eagle ISR flight operations. Squadron members endured 40 improvised explosive device detonations, cleared another 16 IEDs, and withstood multiple small-arms attacks. Over the course of two years, Airmen of the 887th were awarded the Army shoulder sleeve insignia from the 16th and 42nd Military Police Brigades and the 45th, 50th and 32nd Infantry Brigade Combat Teams. During its inactivation ceremony in 2009, Army Lt Col Bradley Anderson, the 2nd Battalion, 127th Infantry Regiment commander stated:

"It's been a great experience having 887th as part of the team. One might expect that different services might experience a certain amount of friction when tasked and organized together, but this experience has disproven that theory. In fact, the integration of our units was so seamless the Air Force should issue you all crossed rifles and change your name to expeditionary infantry squadron."

The 820th would again deploy to lead outside-the-wire patrol operations at Bagram AB, Afghanistan, constituting the 755th Expeditionary Security Forces Squadron ("Reapers") as part of Combined Joint Task Force 455 (CJTF-455). Partnered with the U.S. Army, Afghan National Security Forces, and coalition partners, CJTF-455 was the only Airman-led battlespace owner in Afghanistan and was responsible for conducting area security operations throughout the 220-square-mile base security zone. The National Geographic documentary series "Inside Combat Rescue" followed CJTF-455's hunt for Subhanullah, an insurgent group operating around Bagram Airfield responsible for rockets fired onto the main U.S. operating base and trafficking of weapons used against U.S. and Afghan forces. Overall, CJTF-455 captured or killed 113 insurgents, 83 of which were considered "high value targets" by the United States, during the 2012 and 2013 fighting seasons, and reduced mortar and rocket attacks on the airfield. Starting in 2012 the 820th BDG took over responsibility for the intelligence gathering responsibility outside of Bagram AB. Teaming with Air Force Office of Special Investigations, Security Forces members and OSI made up Expeditionary Detachment 1405 "Task Force Crimson" (Call sign Hustler 6). In December 2015, six TF Crimson members consisting of members of the 823 BDS and 105th SFS were killed while on patrol when a vehicle borne improvised explosive device drove into their formation and detonated. Those killed were Special Agent Chester McBride (former 822 BDS member), Special Agent Mike Cinco, Special Agent Peter Taub, Special Agent Adrianna Vordebruggen, Tech Sergeant Joseph Lemm and Staff Sergeant Louis Bonacasa.

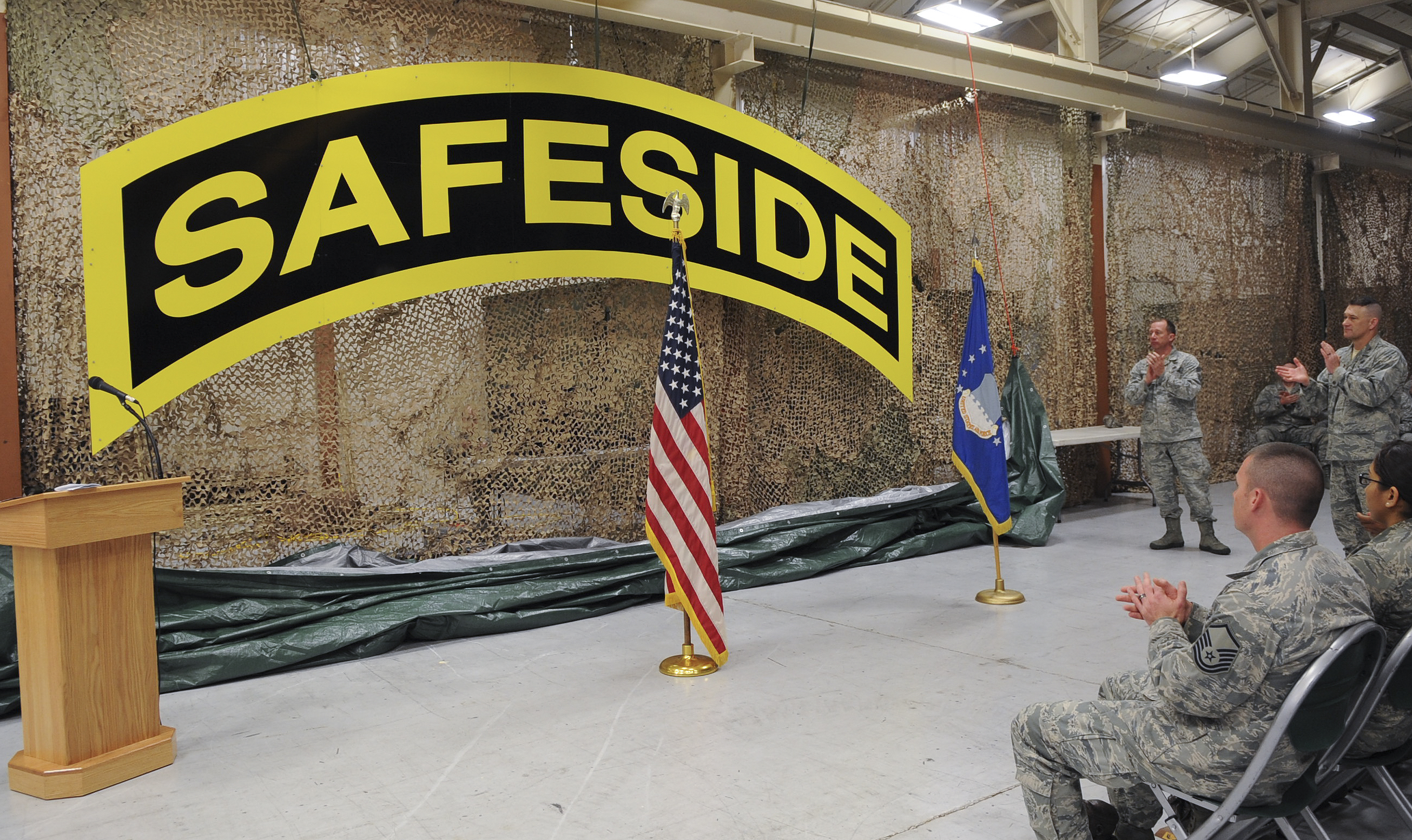
Members of the 820th Base Defense Group at the unveiling of the Safeside tab

The group has also deployed to support humanitarian assistance and disaster relief operations in 2005 to New Orleans after Hurricane Katrina, to Port-au-Prince, Haiti, in response to the 2010 Haiti earthquake, to resecure and reestablish Tyndall AFB following hurricane Michael in 2018, and to support Operation Allies Welcome and enhance security for an Afghan evacuation center at Holloman AFB in 2021.

In August 2009, it was announced that Airmen from the New York Air National Guard's 105th Security Forces Squadron from Stewart Air National Guard Base would support the 820th with manpower for their deployments. Since then, Airmen from the 105 BDS have integrated with the 820 BDG for training and deployments.

The 820th Security Forces Group was redesignated the 820th Base Defense Group in October 2010, becoming the only units in the United States Air Force designated as "Base Defense" group and squadrons. The "SAFESIDE" Tab is the unofficial symbol of the 820th and symbolizes the unit's heritage from the 1041st Security Police Squadron (Test), code named Operation Safeside, and its history as the first Ranger qualified airmen in the Air Force. In 2007, the 823rd Squadron adopted "Jesters" as their unit's moniker and subsequently adapted the SAFESIDE Tab to the "Jesters" Tab as their unofficial symbol.

Some veterans, current troops, and family members of the 820th maintain the Safeside Association. The volunteers maintain the history of the unit, provide periodic newsletters, and organize an annual Safeside reunion at Moody Air Force Base.

== Training and exercises ==
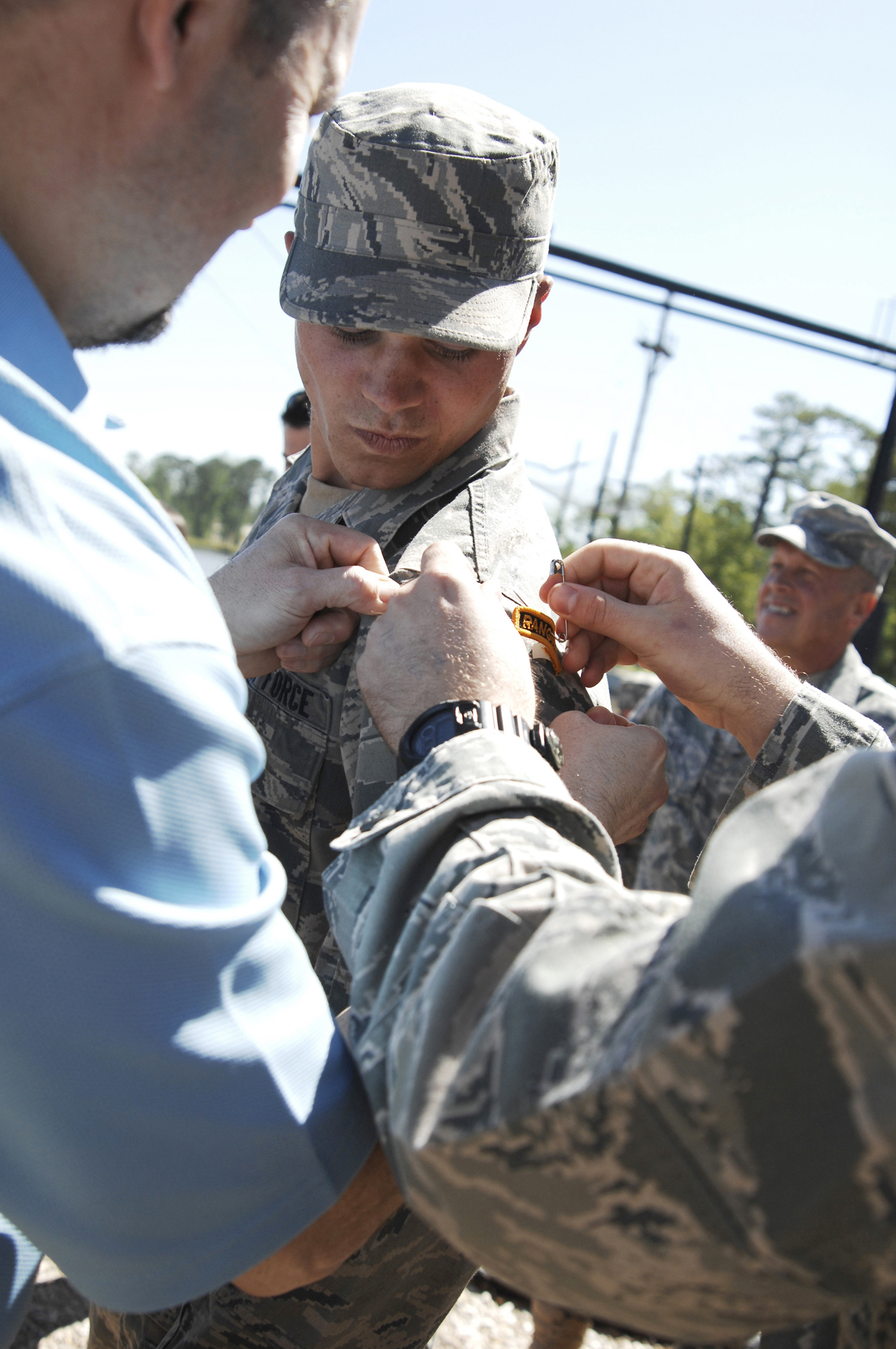
Airman 1st Class Matthew Garner had his Ranger tab pinned on April 29, 2011, by his father, Don Garner, along with his mentor, Staff Sgt. Seth Hunter.

The 820 BDG rotates each of its three Base Defense Squadrons through six-month periods: Reconstitution/Training, Certification/Stand-By, and Immediate Response Force Alert. To do so, each squadron operates independently and every functional specialty within the squadron works, trains, and deploys together for the duration of their time at the squadron. The 820 COS provides support, training, equipment, and program management to ensure the mobility readiness of the three base defense squadrons.

In the training phase, personnel maintain the individual requirements for both professional military development and functional training for their core Air Force specialty. This includes weapons qualifications on the various small arms and light weapons employed by the 820th that are typically conducted at the Camp Blanding Joint Training Center in Florida over the course of a week and include ranges for M24, M110, M82A1, M249, M240, M2, Mk19, M320, AT4, M18 Claymore, and the M67 Fragmentation Grenade. Other recurring small arms training for M4 and M9/M18 pistol is conducted at Moody AFB.

Due to its wide range of missions, various joint schools are available to the group's personnel that are not typically afforded other Air Force units and include: Ranger, Airborne, Jumpmaster, Pathfinder, Air Assault, Rappel Master, Fast Rope Insertion Extraction System/SPIES Master, Close Precision Engagement Course, Army Sniper, Special Reaction Team, Raven B and Puma sUAS Operator, Air Advisor, Jungle/Mountain/Arctic Warfare, and EMT. This training ensures integration and interoperability with the Joint Force.

In the certification phase, a base defense squadron will conduct a Mission Readiness Exercise to validate the unit's readiness, collective training, and capability to execute its mission essential tasks. While these evaluations have historically focused on defense of a Forward Operating Base in a Global War on Terrorism setting, in 2019, the 820th shifted the focus to defending distributed operations and adaptive basing, or Agile Combat Employment.

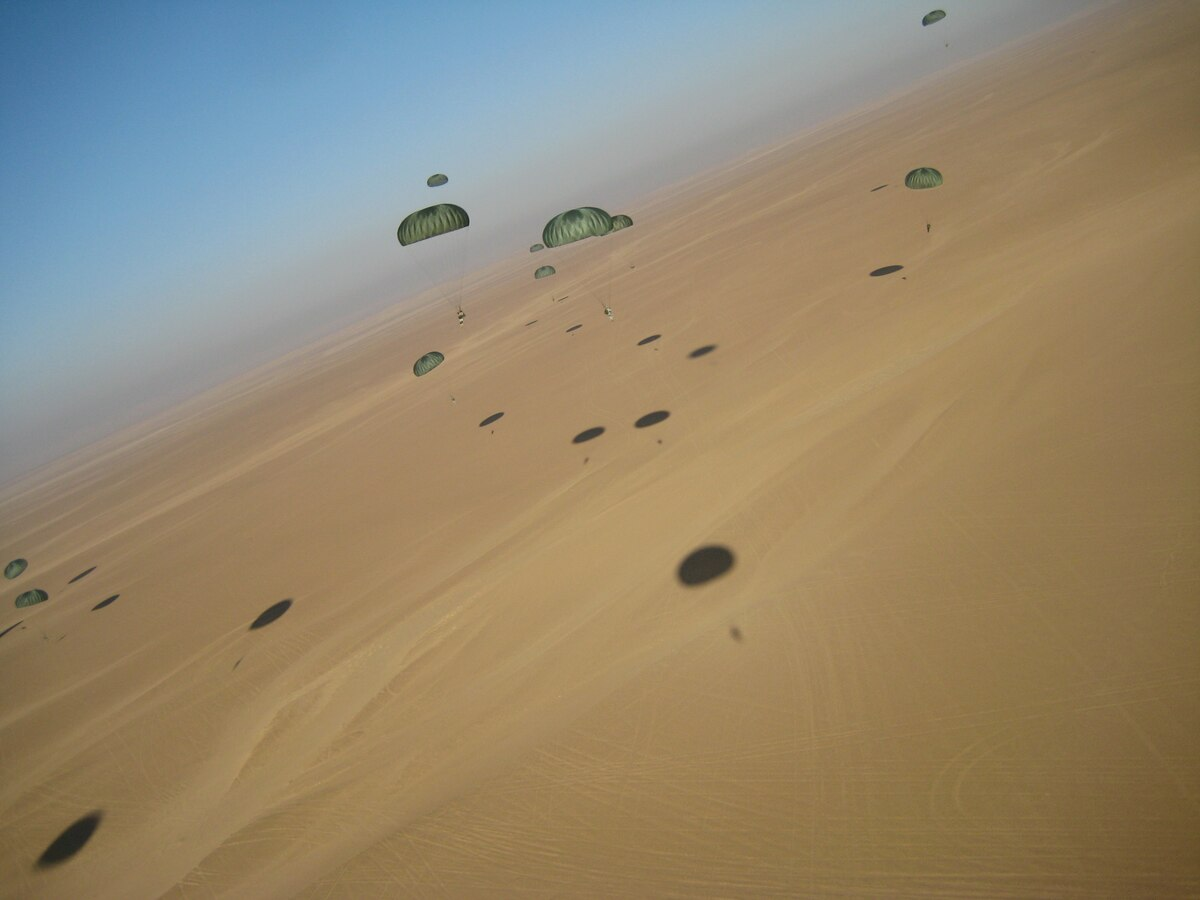
Airmen from the 820th Security Forces Group in a joint Egyptian government and U.S. Central Command exercise held in Egypt

=== Notable exercises ===
Exercise Bright Star '97, '02, and '07: The then-820 SFG participated in an Egyptian government and United States Central Command exercise held in Egypt. The exercise involved thousands of troops from 13 countries including; France, Britain, Greece, Germany, Italy, the Netherlands, Jordan and Kuwait. In 2007, 820 SFG Airmen participated as part of the Airborne Task Force, conducting an airborne insertion into Egypt.

Operation Southern Partner '09: The 820th provided base defense and force protection specialists for subject matter exchanges with partner nation air forces in seven Caribbean and Latin American nations across the U.S. Southern Command area of focus.

In 2014, the 820th began participating in an annual trilateral force protection event, Exercise Global Eagle. This exercise incorporates collective training of the 820th, UK's Royal Air Force Regiment, and France's Commando Parachutiste de l'Air and culminates with a combined field training exercise and airborne operation.

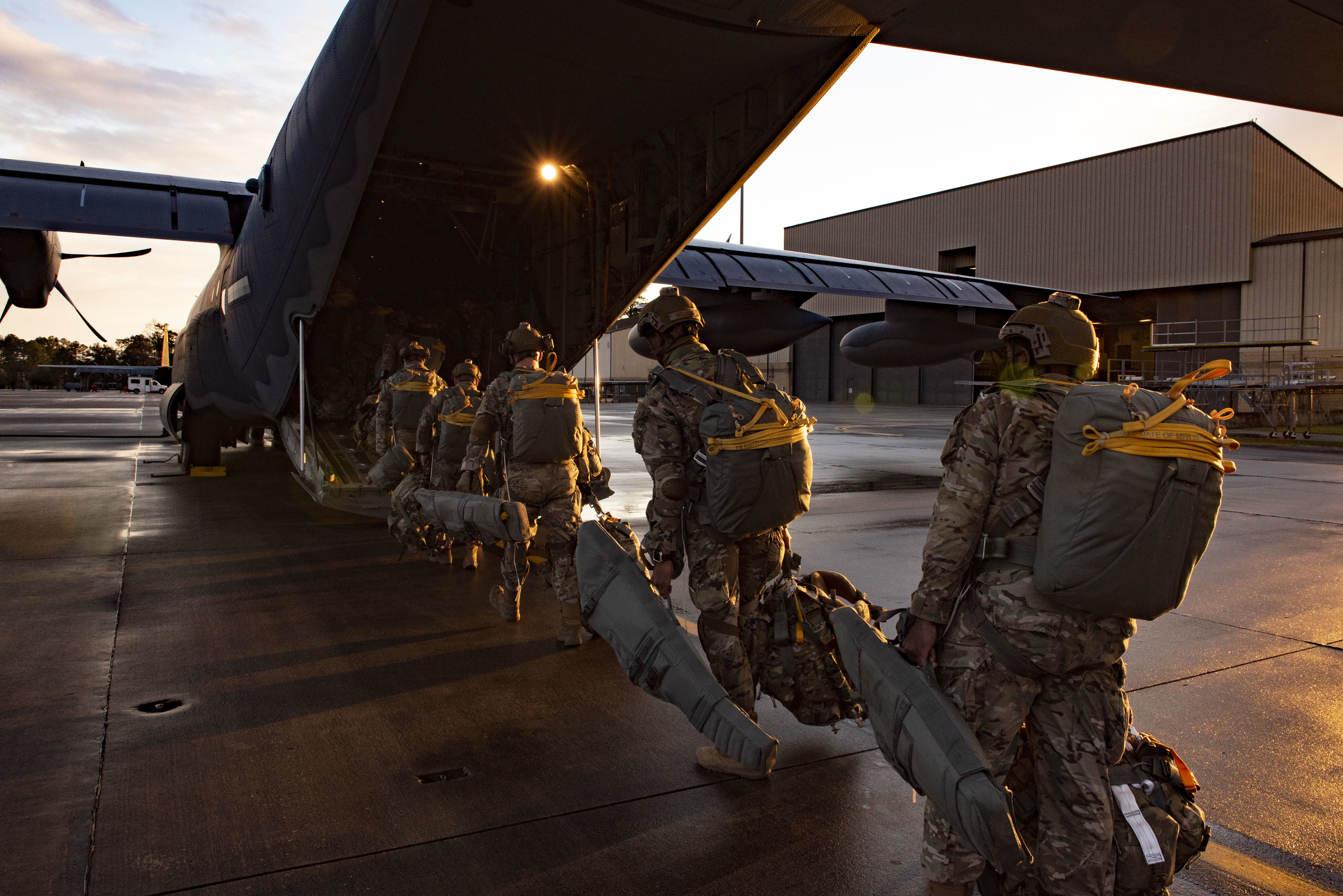
Airmen assigned to the 820th Base Defense Group load on to an HC-130J Combat King II before an airborne jump for Mosaic Tiger, at Moody Air Force Base, Georgia.

Exercise Cope North '17: The 820th participated in a multilateral base defense exercise in Guam with the Royal Australian Air Force, Japan Air Self-Defense Force, and other Air Forces Pacific units to counter a scenario involving militia training local villagers to conduct guerilla attacks, mortar strikes, and improvised explosive devices. This was the 820th's first exercise to test their ability to operate in a jungle environment.

Exercise Mobility Guardian '19: An advance element of the 820th conducted a Joint Forcible Entry/Airfield Seizure with 1st Brigade/82nd Airborne Division in the northwest USA to enable the follow-on forces and security of the established airfield. This adaptive basing scenario was described as one of the largest conducted by Air Mobility Command.

Exercise Mosaic Tiger 21-1: An airborne section of the group seized and secured an airfield with USAF special tactics airmen from Fort Bragg, North Carolina enabling the delivery of follow-on forces to establish basing for forward air support and personnel recovery assets from 23rd Wing. Mosaic Tiger 21-1 was a culmination of nearly two years of planning to prove the skills of the MCA as part of the Air Force’s Agile Combat Employment concept to provide more well-rounded and proficient Airmen.

Exercise Red Flag-Nellis 22-1: The 820th participated as a ground element in the Nevada Test and Training Range marking the first integration of the ground defense element to Red Flag.

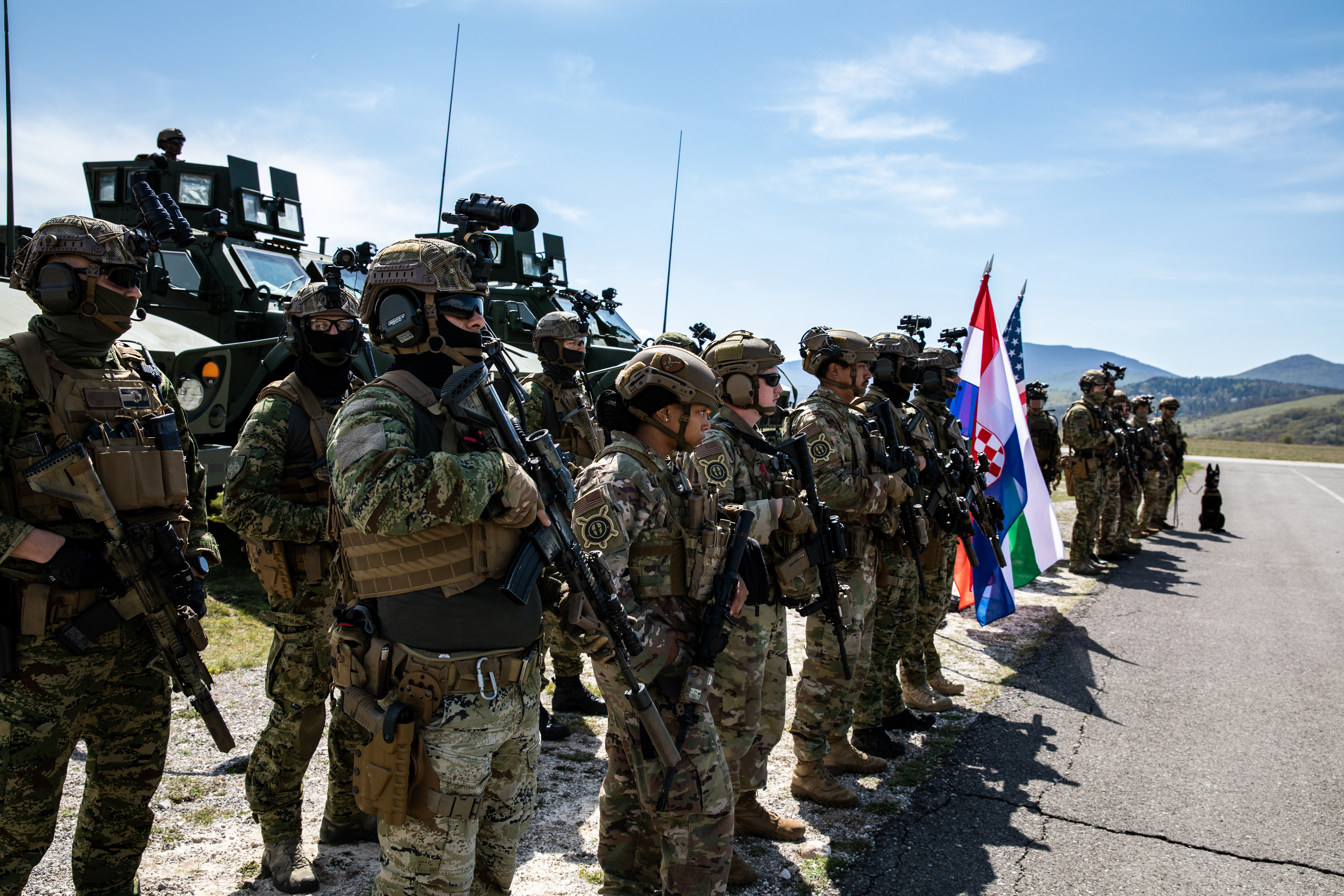
Croatian and Bulgarian special operations force members and 820th Group members participate in a joint forcible entry operation during Exercise Trojan Footprint 22 (Note: Trojan Footprint is the premier special operations forces (SOF) exercise in Europe that focuses on improving the ability of SOF to counter myriad threats, increases integration with conventional forces and enhances interoperability with our NATO allies and European partners.)

Exercise Trojan Footprint '22: The group participated in Special Operations Command Europe's most significant exercise of the year and the largest SOF exercise in Europe to date. While not SOF, the 820 BDG participated in multiple missions led by the Special Operations Task Unit, including joint forcible entry training, during which the 820 BDG supplied their military working dog teams, communication assets, and support by fire. The 820th has also participated in other exercises within the special operations community.

== Lineage ==
- Established as the 82d Combat Security Police Wing and activated on 5 March 1968

Inactivated on 31 December 1969
Disestablished on 15 June 1983
Reestablished and redesignated 820th Security Forces Group, on 17 March 1997
Redesignated 820th Base Defense Group on 30 September 2010

=== Assignments ===
- Tactical Air Command, 8 March 1968
- Ninth Air Force, 15 August – 31 December 1969
- Air Force Security Forces Center, 17 March 1997
- Ninth Air Force, 14 March 2001
- 347th Rescue Wing, 18 August 2006
- 23rd Wing, 1 October 2006
- 93rd Air Ground Operations Wing, 25 January 2008 – present

== Stations ==
- Fairchild Air Force Base, Washington, 8 March 1968
- Fort Campbell, Kentucky, 15 August 1968 – 31 December 1969
- Lackland Air Force Base, Texas, 17 March 1997
- Moody Air Force Base, Georgia, 14 March 2001 – present

== Unit awards ==
Award streamer	Award	Dates	Notes
	Air Force Outstanding Unit Award	8 March – 31 August 1968	
	Air Force Outstanding Unit Award	17 March 1997 – 30 September 1998	
	Air Force Outstanding Unit Award	1 October 1998 – 30 September 2000	
	Air Force Outstanding Unit Award w/Combat "V" Device	1 June 2002 – 31 May 2003	
	Air Force Outstanding Unit Award	1 June 2004 – 31 May 2006	
	Air Force Outstanding Unit Award	25 January 2008 – 31 May 2009	
