= General Farrell =

General Farrell may refer to:

- Edelmiro Julián Farrell (1887–1980), Argentine general and de facto president of Argentina from 1944 to 1946
- Francis William Farrell (1900—1981), U.S. Army lieutenant general
- Sean M. Farrell (fl. 1990s–2020s), U.S. Air Force major general
- Thomas Farrell (United States Army officer) (1891–1967), U.S. Army major general
