= Christopher Ireland =

U.S. Air Force general

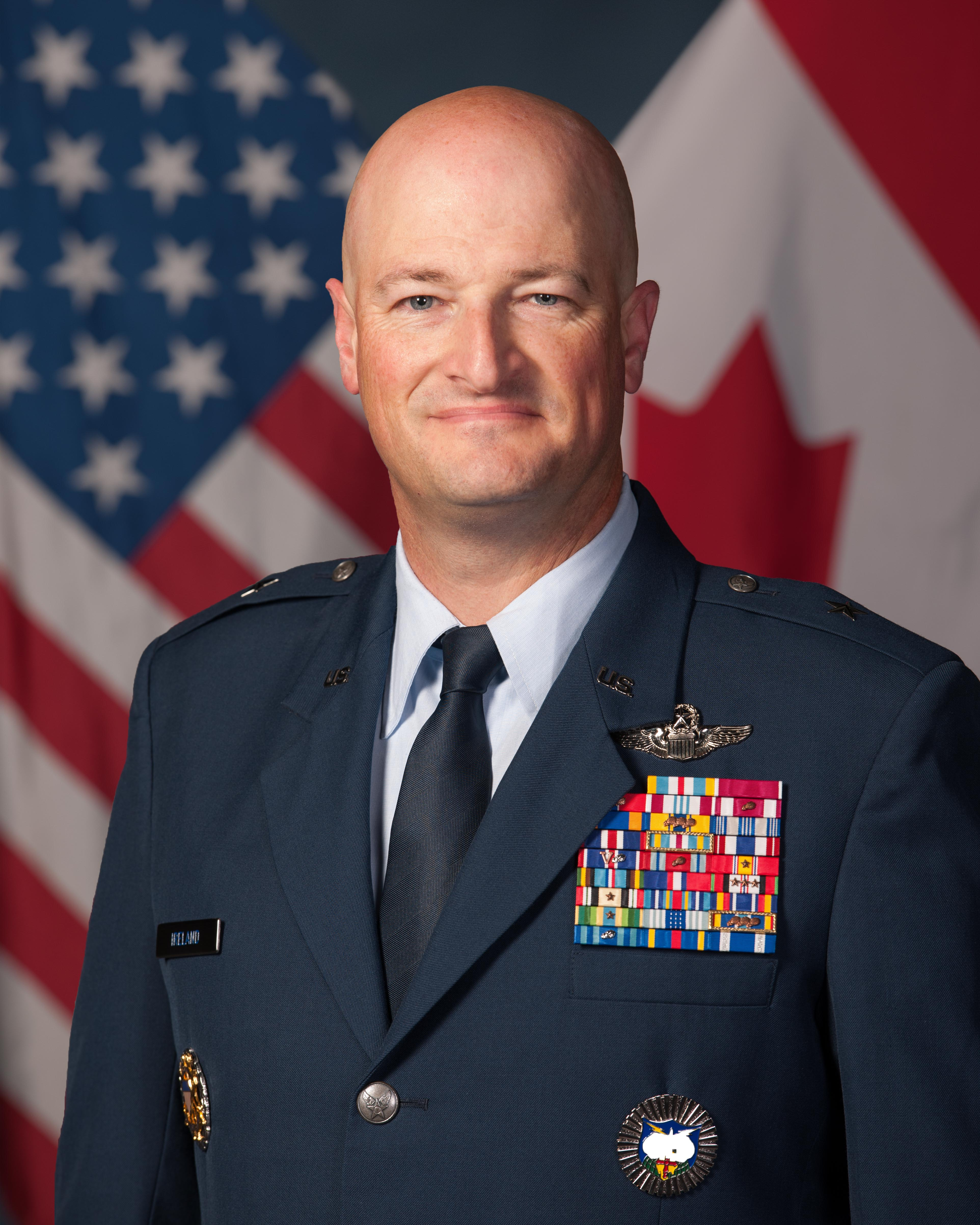
- Official portrait, 2017
- Military career
- Allegiance: United States
- Branch: United States Air Force
- Service years: 1991–present
- Rank: Brigadier General
- Commands: 1st Expeditionary Special Operations Wing; 352nd Special Operations Group
- Awards: Defense Superior Service Medal; Legion of Merit

Christopher J. Ireland is a United States Air Force brigadier general who serves as the Chief of Staff of the United States Air Forces in Europe – Air Forces Africa. He is to retire on October 1, 2021.

Prior to that, he was the Deputy Commander of the Canadian North American Aerospace Defense Region.

Military offices
Preceded by ???	Special Assistant to the Commander of the United States Special Operations Command; 2015–2016	Succeeded by David H. Tabor
Preceded by Chad T. Manske	Deputy Commander of the Canadian North American Aerospace Defense Region; 2017–2019	Succeeded by ???
Preceded by Richard G. Moore	Chief of Staff of the United States Air Forces in Europe – Air Forces Africa; 2019–2021	Succeeded by Steven G. Edwards
