= Kirk W. Smith =

U.S. Africa Cpmmand deputy commander

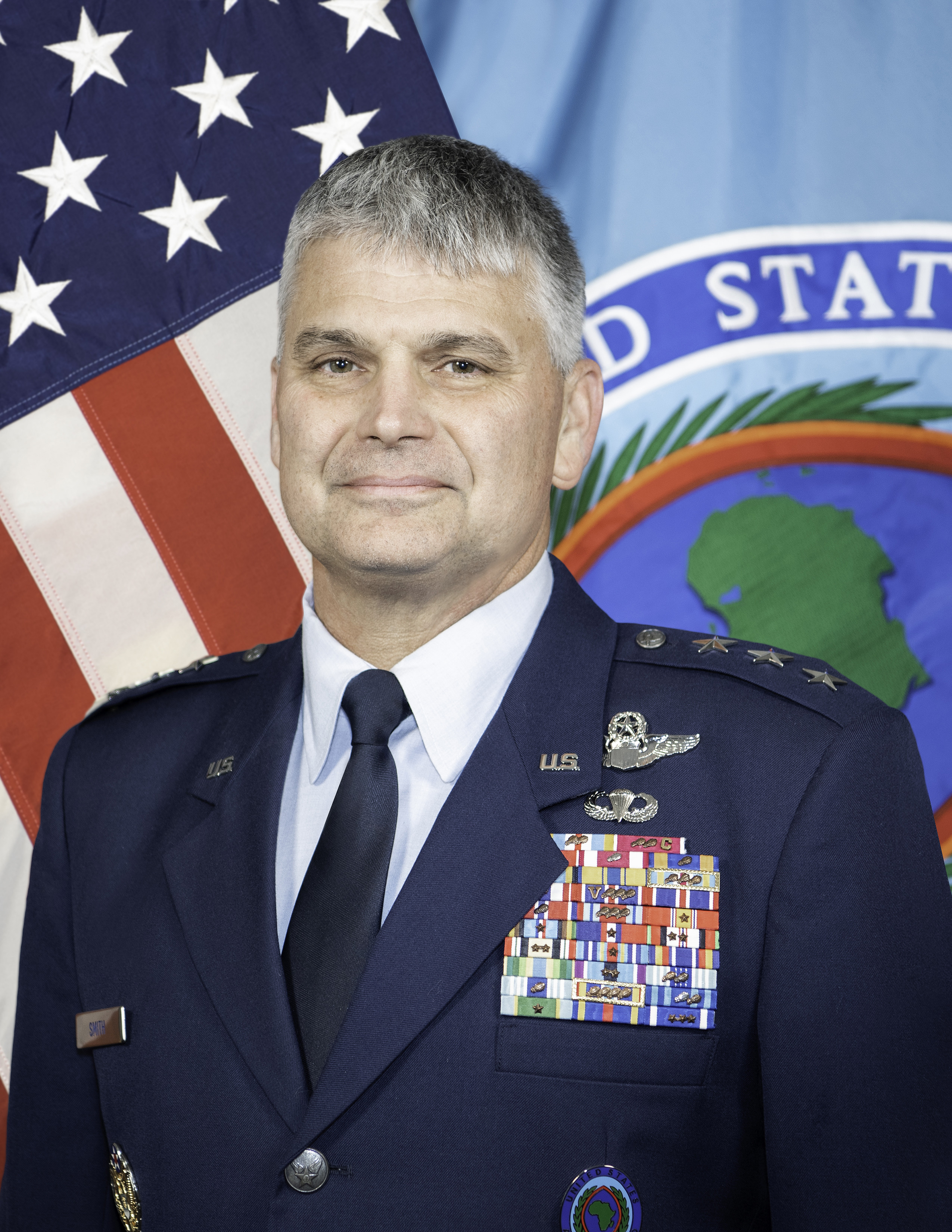
- Military career
- Allegiance: United States
- Branch: United States Air Force
- Service years: 1989–2024
- Rank: Lieutenant General
- Commands: Special Operations Command Europe; 21st Special Operations Squadron
- Conflicts: War in Afghanistan; Iraq War
- Awards: Defense Superior Service Medal (3); Legion of Merit (3) with "C" device Bronze Star Medal (2)

Kirk William Smith is a retired United States Air Force lieutenant general who served as the deputy commander of the United States Africa Command. Prior to that, he was the commander of the Special Operations Command Europe of the United States European Command.

== Awards and decorations ==
US Air Force Command Pilot Badge
Basic Parachutist Badge
United States Africa Command Badge
Headquarters Air Force Badge

Defense Superior Service Medal with two bronze oak leaf clusters
Legion of Merit with "C" device and two oak leaf clusters
Bronze Star Medal with oak leaf cluster
Meritorious Service Medal with silver oak leaf cluster
Air Medal with oak leaf cluster
Aerial Achievement Medal
Air Force Commendation Medal
Joint Meritorious Unit Award with three oak leaf clusters
Air Force Meritorious Unit Award
Air Force Outstanding Unit Award with Valor device and three bronze oak leaf clusters
Air Force Outstanding Unit Award (second ribbon to denote fifth award)
Air Force Organizational Excellence Award with oak leaf cluster
Combat Readiness Medal with three oak leaf clusters
National Defense Service Medal with one bronze service star
Armed Forces Expeditionary Medal with service star
Kosovo Campaign Medal with service star
Afghanistan Campaign Medal with two service stars
Iraq Campaign Medal with two service stars
Global War on Terrorism Expeditionary Medal with service star
Global War on Terrorism Service Medal
Armed Forces Service Medal
Humanitarian Service Medal with two service stars
Air Force Overseas Short Tour Service Ribbon with two oak leaf clusters
Air Force Overseas Long Tour Service Ribbon with oak leaf cluster
Air Force Expeditionary Service Ribbon with gold frame and four oak leaf clusters
Air Force Longevity Service Award with one silver and two bronze oak leaf clusters
Small Arms Expert Marksmanship Ribbon with service star
Air Force Training Ribbon
NATO Medal for the former Yugoslavia with three service stars

== Effective dates of promotions ==
Rank	Date
Second Lieutenant	May 31, 1989
First Lieutenant	May 31, 1991
Captain	May 31, 1993
Major	September 1, 2000
Lieutenant Colonel	April 1, 2005
Colonel	September 1, 2009
Brigadier General	December 3, 2014
Major General	July 3, 2018
Lieutenant General	August 4, 2020

Military offices
Preceded by Albert Elton	Director of Strategic Plans, Programs and Requirements of the Air Force Special Operations Command; 2014–2016	Succeeded by Sean M. Farrell
Preceded by Stephen A. Clark	Director of Force Management and Development of the United States Special Operations Command; 2016–2017	Succeeded by ???
Preceded by Antonio Fletcher	Deputy Commanding General for Operations of NATO Special Operations Component Command and Special Operations Joint Task Force-Afghanistan; 2017–2018	Succeeded by Otto K. Liller
Preceded by Mark C. Schwartz	Commander of Special Operations Command Europe; 2018–2020	Succeeded by David H. Tabor
Preceded by James C. Vechery	Deputy Commander of the United States Africa Command; 2020–2024	Succeeded by John W. Brennan
