= Richard G. Moore =

U.S. Air Force general

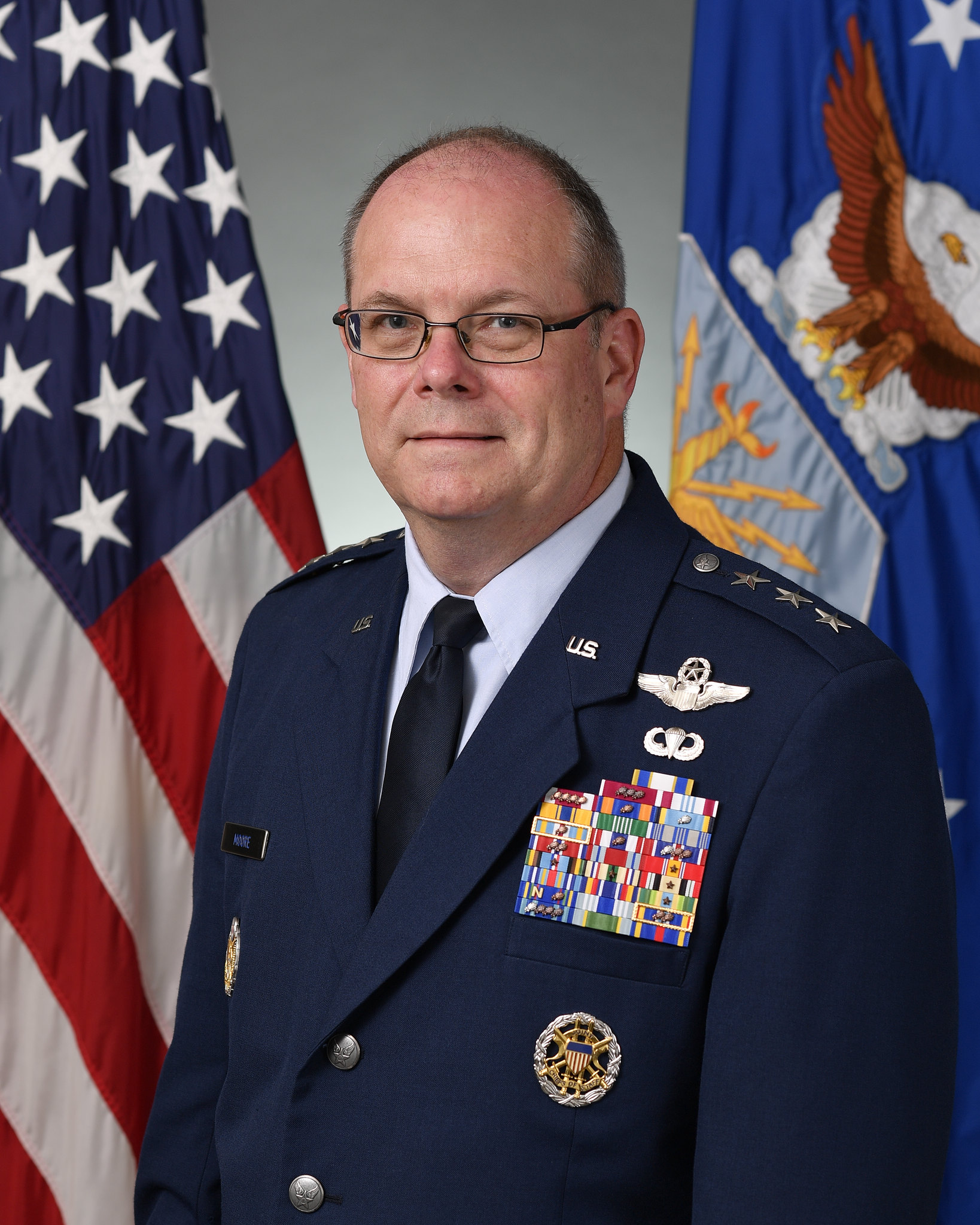
- Official portrait, 2024
- Born: Houston, Texas, U.S.
- Alma mater: United States Air Force Academy (BS); Washington State University (MEM); Air Command and Staff College (MMOAS); Air War College (MS)
- Military career
- Allegiance: United States
- Branch: United States Air Force
- Service years: 1992–2024
- Rank: Lieutenant General
- Commands: 86th Airlift Wing; 436th Airlift Wing; 385th Air Expeditionary Group; 437th Expeditionary Operations Support Squadron; 437th Operations Support Squadron
- Conflicts: Iraq War
- Awards: Legion of Merit (4)

Richard Garner Moore Jr. is a retired United States Air Force lieutenant general who last served as the deputy chief of staff for plans and programs of the U.S. Air Force from 2022 to 2024. He previously served as director of programs of the U.S. Air Force.

In May 2022, Moore was nominated for promotion to lieutenant general and appointment as deputy chief of staff for plans and programs of the United States Air Force.

Military offices
Preceded by Jon T. Thomas	Commander of the 86th Airlift Wing; 2016–2018	Succeeded by Mark R. August
Preceded by Christopher Craige	Chief of Staff of the United States Air Forces in Europe – Air Forces Africa; 2018–2019	Succeeded by Christopher Ireland
Preceded by David S. Nahom	Director of Programs of the United States Air Force; 2019–2022	Succeeded by David H. Tabor
Preceded by David S. Nahom	Deputy Chief of Staff for Plans and Programs of the United States Air Force; 2022–2024	Succeeded by David H. Tabor
