= Antonio Fletcher =

U.S. Army general

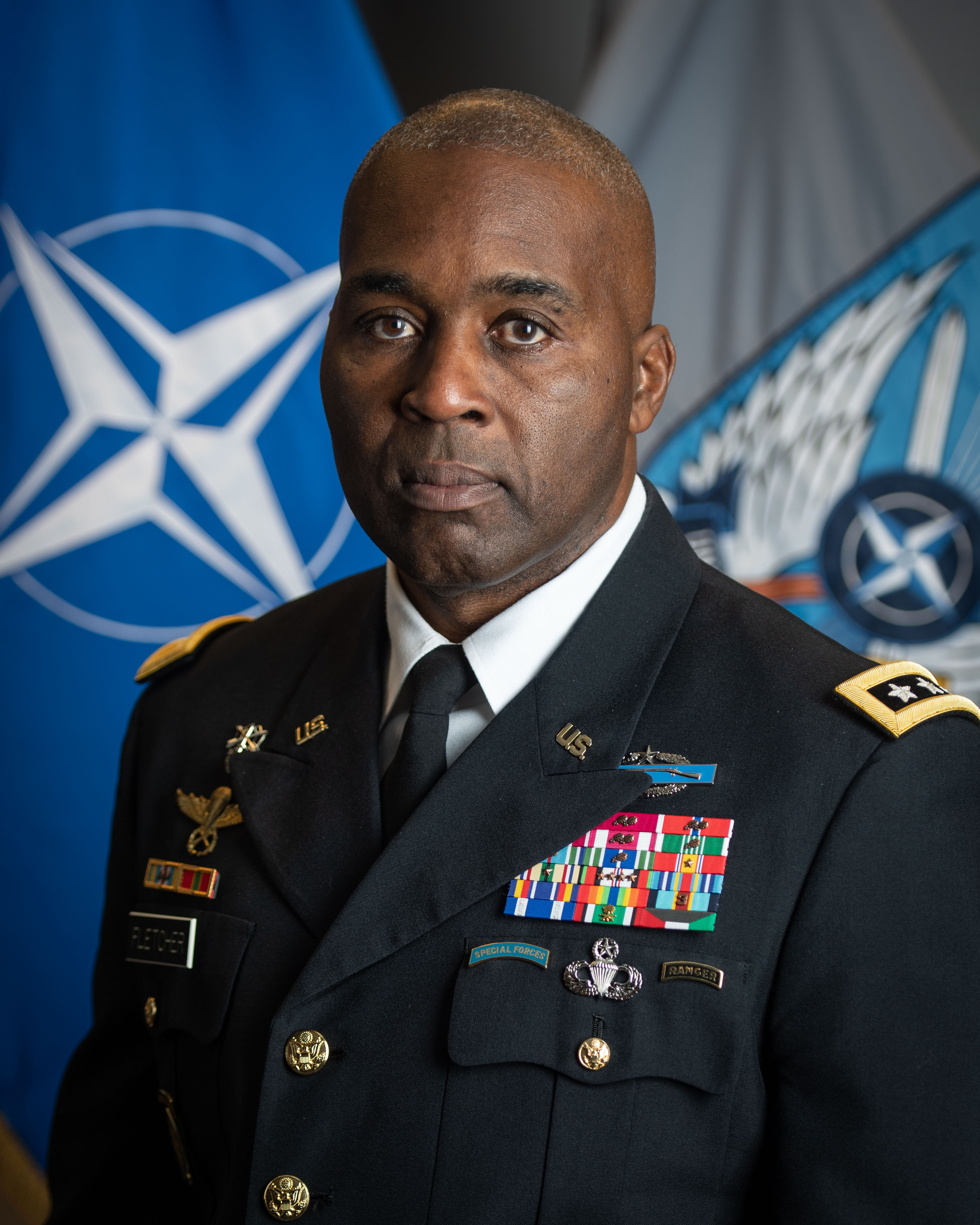
- Official portrait, 2021
- Military career
- Allegiance: United States
- Branch: United States Army
- Service years: 1989–2024
- Rank: Lieutenant General
- Commands: NATO Special Operations Headquarters; Special Operations Command South; 7th Special Forces Group; Special Operations Task Force 73; 3rd Battalion, 7th Special Forces Group
- Conflicts: Gulf War; War in Afghanistan
- Awards: Army Distinguished Service Medal; Legion of Merit (3); Bronze Star Medal (3)

Antonio M. Fletcher is a retired United States Army lieutenant general who last served as commander of the Allied Special Operations Forces Command (formerly NATO Special Operations Headquarters) from 2021 to 2024. He most recently served as the deputy director of the Defense Threat Reduction Agency from 2020 to 2021. Previously, he served as the Commander of Special Operations Command South from 2018 to 2020.

In July 2021, he was nominated for promotion to lieutenant general, replacing Mark C. Schwartz as the nominee for the commander of the NATO Special Operations Headquarters. He was promoted to his present rank on October 15, 2021.

Military offices
Preceded by Paul J. Rock	Director of Strategy, Policy, and Plans of the United States Southern Command; 2017–2018	Succeeded by David Bellon
Preceded by Collin P. Green	Commander of Special Operations Command South; 2018–2020	Succeeded by Keith Davids
Preceded by Darsie Rogers	Deputy Director of the Defense Threat Reduction Agency; 2020–2021	Succeeded by Ryan B. Scholl
Preceded by Rob Stephenson; Acting	Commander of the Allied Special Operations Forces Command; 2021–2024	Succeeded by Richard E. Angle
