= Timothy Szymanski =

American Navy admiral and SEAL (born 1962)

Timothy G. Szymanski
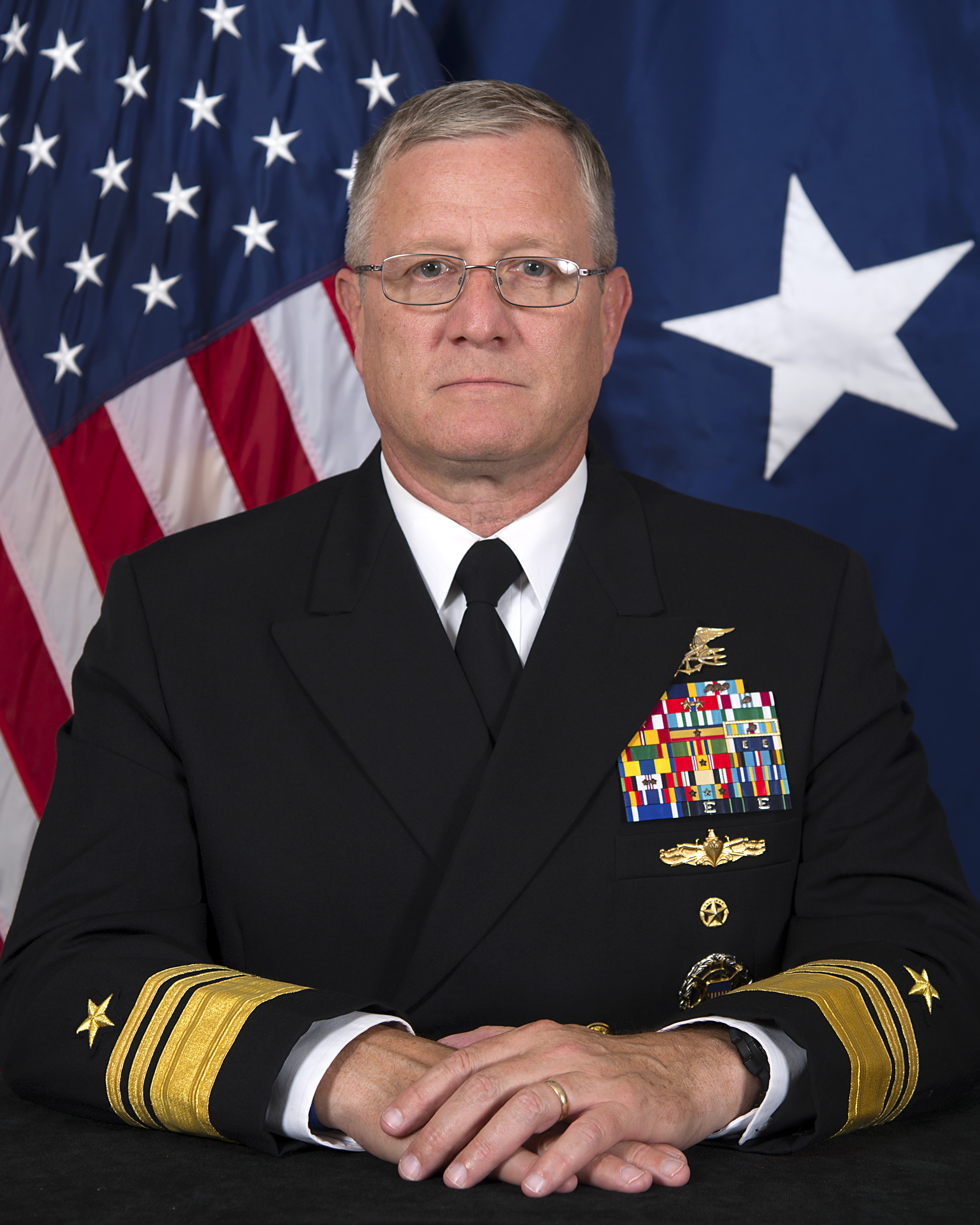
- Born: 1962 (age 63–64)
- Military career
- Allegiance: United States
- Branch: United States Navy
- Service years: 1985–2021
- Rank: Vice Admiral
- Commands: United States Naval Special Warfare Command; Naval Special Warfare Group 2 SEAL Team 2 Special Boat Unit 26
- Conflicts: War in Afghanistan; Iraq War
- Awards: Navy Distinguished Service Medal; Defense Superior Service Medal (4); Legion of Merit (3); Bronze Star Medal (3)

Timothy Gerard "Tim" Szymanski (born 1962) is a retired United States Navy vice admiral who last served as deputy commander of United States Special Operations Command from October 15, 2018 to December 2021. He is the former commander of United States Naval Special Warfare Command in Coronado, California.

== Early life and education ==
Szymanski is a native of Wilmington, Delaware. He graduated from the Salesianum School in 1980, where he was a three-year varsity letterman in wrestling and, in 1980, represented the United States in an international AAU Freestyle wrestling tournament in Tokyo, Japan. He then attended the Naval Academy Preparatory School from 1980 to 1981, and graduated from the United States Naval Academy in 1985. He completed a Masters of Joint Campaign Planning and Strategy at Joint Advanced Warfighting School.

== Naval career ==
After receiving his commission in 1985, Szymanski served in the Surface Warfare community and qualified as a surface warfare officer before transitioning to the SEALs. He volunteered for Basic Underwater Demolition/SEAL training (BUD/S) graduating with Class 161 in 1989. Following SEAL Tactical Training (STT) and completion of six month probationary period, he received the 1130 designator as a Naval Special Warfare Officer, entitled to wear the Special Warfare insignia also known as "SEAL Trident".

Szymanski's Naval Special Warfare (NSW) and operational assignments include platoon commander and task unit commander at SEAL Delivery Vehicle Team 2. In 1992, Szymanski volunteered for assignment to Naval Special Warfare Development Group (NSWDG) in Damneck, Virginia, and completed a specialized selection and training course known as Green Team. He served as troop commander, squadron commander and current operations officer with the command until 1997. Szymanski was selected as commanding officer of Special Boat Unit 26 and later returned to NSWDG for a 2nd tour as unit operations officer from 2000 to 2002. As a commander, Szymanski served as commanding officer of SEAL Team 2 from 2002 to 2004. Szymanski's staff assignments include officer community manager for NSW and enlisted community manager for SEALs, Navy Divers, explosive ordnance disposal (EOD) technicians, and special warfare combatant craft crewmen (SWCC). He served on the Joint Staff as the J3 deputy directorate for Special Operations as the Global War on Terror branch chief and as chief staff officer of Pakistan-Afghanistan Coordination Cell.

Szymanski commanded a O6-level Joint Task Force in Afghanistan, served as deputy unit commander of Naval Special Warfare Development Group from 2007 to 2008 and commanded Naval Special Warfare Group TWO from 2009 to 2011. He served as deputy commanding general sustainment to Special Operations Joint Task Force-Afghanistan/NATO Special Operations Component Command-Afghanistan.

On 3 August 2016, Szymanski succeeded Rear Admiral Brian L. Losey as commander, Naval Special Warfare Command. His prior assignment was the assistant to the commander of Joint Special Operations Command at Fort Bragg, North Carolina.

On 19 July 2018, Szymanski was nominated for promotion to vice admiral, but his next assignment was not disclosed at the time.

He retired from active duty in December 2021.

== Awards and decorations ==
Szymanski has received multiple awards and recognitions:

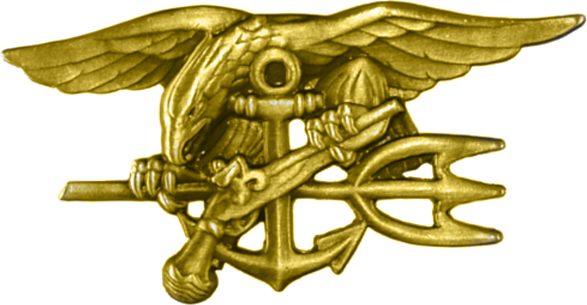

Badge	SEAL Insignia		
1st Row	Navy Distinguished Service Medal		Defense Superior Service Medal w/ three bronze oak leaf clusters
2nd Row	Legion of Merit Medal w/ 2 gold award stars	Bronze Star w/ 2 award stars	Defense Meritorious Service Medal w/ 1 oak leaf cluster
3rd Row	Meritorious Service Medal w/ 1 award star	Joint Service Commendation Medal	Navy and Marine Corps Commendation Medal
4th Row	Combat Action Ribbon	Navy Presidential Unit Citation w/ 1 bronze service star	Joint Meritorious Unit Award w/ oak leaf cluster
5th Row	Navy Unit Commendation	Navy Meritorious Unit Commendation	Navy E Ribbon w/ 2 Battle "E" devices
6th Row	Navy Expeditionary Medal	National Defense Service Medal w/ 1 service star	Armed Forces Expeditionary Medal
7th Row	Afghanistan Campaign Medal w/ 2 campaign stars	Iraq Campaign Medal	Global War on Terrorism Expeditionary Medal
8th Row	Global War on Terrorism Service Medal	Sea Service Deployment Ribbon w/ 7 service stars	Overseas Service Ribbon
9th row	NATO Medal for the former Yugoslavia	Rifle Marksmanship Medal	Pistol Marksmanship Medal
Badge	Surface Warfare Officer Insignia		
Badge	Naval Parachutist insignia		
Badge	Command at Sea insignia		
Badge	Office of the Joint Chiefs of Staff Identification Badge		

In 2015, Szymanski was inducted into Salesianum School's hall of fame.

== Controversies ==
Szymanski actively thwarted efforts to award the Medal of Honor to U.S. Air Force combat controller, Master Sergeant John A. Chapman. It is established that Admiral Szymanski undertook his course of action to protect the reputation of his SEAL community.

Military offices
Preceded by Michael Kurilla	Assistant Commanding General of Joint Special Operations Command; 2014–2016	Succeeded by Dan Caine
Preceded by Brian L. Losey	Commander of the United States Naval Special Warfare Command; 2016–2018	Succeeded by Collin P. Green
Preceded by Joseph Osterman	Deputy Commander of the United States Special Operations Command; 2018–2021	Succeeded by Collin P. Green
