= Collin P. Green =

American military official (born 1962)

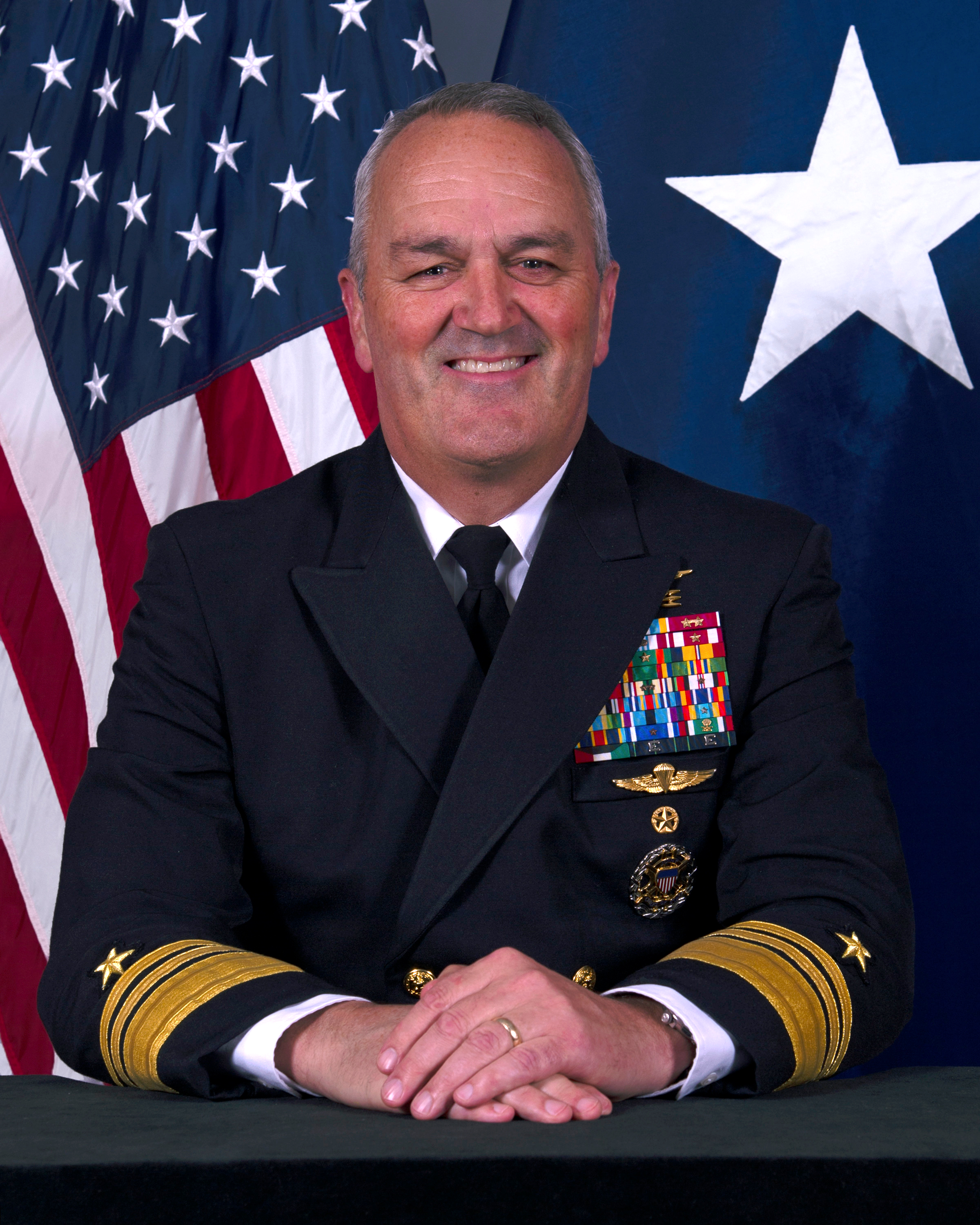
- Official portrait, 2022
- Born: 1962 (age 63–64); Bowie, Maryland, U.S.
- Military career
- Allegiance: United States
- Branch: United States Navy
- Service years: 1986–2024
- Rank: Vice Admiral
- Commands: United States Naval Special Warfare Command; United States Special Operations Command South; SEAL Team 3
- Conflicts: Gulf War; War in Afghanistan; Iraq War
- Awards: Navy Distinguished Service Medal; Defense Superior Service Medal (2); Legion of Merit (3)

Collin Patrick Green (born 1962) is a retired United States Navy vice admiral who last served as the deputy commander of the United States Special Operations Command from 2021 to 2024. He most recently served as Chief of Staff of the United States Special Operations Command. He graduated and was commissioned from the United States Naval Academy in 1986. Green also holds degrees from the Catholic University of America and United States Naval War College. He is a naval special warfare officer and previously served as commander of United States Special Operations Command South from 2016 to June 2018.

Green relinquished command of Naval Special Warfare Command in September 2020, before transitioning to the Chief of Staff position at the United States Special Operations Command in Tampa, Florida.

Green was born and raised in Bowie, Maryland, one of nine children. His father, Leo E. Green, is a former Maryland state senator and mayor of Bowie. He is married and has four children.

In October 2021, he was nominated for promotion to vice admiral and assignment as the deputy commander of the United States Special Operations Command, succeeding Timothy Szymanski, being confirmed in December of the same year.

Military offices
| Preceded by Kurt L. Sonntag | Commander of the United States Special Operations Command South; 2016–2018 | Succeeded by Antonio M. Fletcher |
| Preceded by Timothy G. Szymanski | Commander of the United States Naval Special Warfare Command; 2018–2020 | Succeeded by H. W. Howard III |
| Preceded by Tony D. Bauernfeind | Chief of Staff of the United States Special Operations Command; 2020–2021 | Succeeded by Marcus S. Evans |
| Preceded by Timothy G. Szymanski | Deputy Commander of the United States Special Operations Command; 2021–2024 | Succeeded by Sean M. Farrell |
