= James C. Vechery =

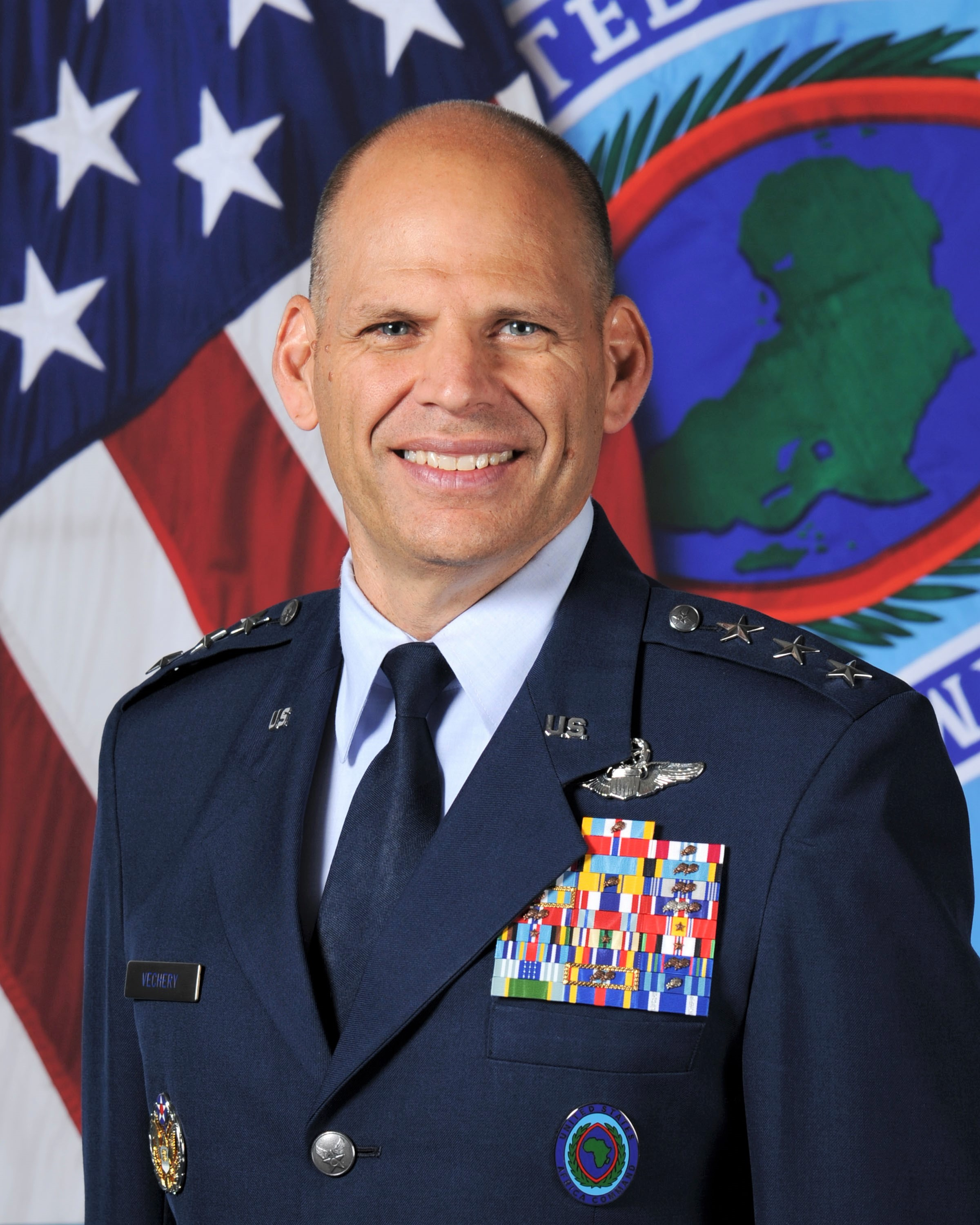
- Lieutenant General James C. Vechery in 2017
- Born: July 26, 1966 (age 60); Maryland, United States
- Military career
- Allegiance: United States
- Branch: United States Air Force
- Service years: 1988–2020
- Rank: Lieutenant General
- Commands: 60th Air Mobility Wing; 22nd Air Refueling Wing; 912th Air Refueling Squadron
- Conflicts: War in Afghanistan
- Awards: Defense Superior Service Medal (2); Legion of Merit (3); Bronze Star Medal

James Calvin Vechery (born July 26, 1966) is a retired lieutenant general in the United States Air Force, who last served as the Deputy to the Commander for Military Operations of United States Africa Command. He was commissioned upon graduating from the University of Maryland in 1988, through the Air Force Reserve Officers' Training Corps.

== Awards and decorations ==
US Air Force Command Pilot Badge
United States Africa Command Badge
Headquarters Air Force Badge

Defense Superior Service Medal with one bronze oak leaf cluster
Legion of Merit with two oak leaf clusters
Bronze Star Medal
Defense Meritorious Service Medal with oak leaf cluster
Meritorious Service Medal with two oak leaf clusters
Air Medal
Aerial Achievement Medal with two oak leaf clusters
Joint Service Commendation Medal
Air Force Commendation Medal with oak leaf cluster
Air Force Achievement Medal with two oak leaf clusters
Joint Meritorious Unit Award with oak leaf cluster
Air Force Meritorious Unit Award
Air Force Outstanding Unit Award with two silver and one bronze oak leaf clusters
Air Force Organizational Excellence Award with two oak leaf clusters
Combat Readiness Medal
National Defense Service Medal with one bronze service star
Armed Forces Expeditionary Medal with service star
Southwest Asia Service Medal with service star
Afghanistan Campaign Medal with service star
Global War on Terrorism Expeditionary Medal
Global War on Terrorism Service Medal
Nuclear Deterrence Operations Service Medal with two oak leaf clusters
Air Force Overseas Short Tour Service Ribbon
Air Force Expeditionary Service Ribbon with gold frame and two oak leaf clusters
Air Force Longevity Service Award with one silver and two bronze oak leaf clusters
Small Arms Expert Marksmanship Ribbon
Air Force Training Ribbon
NATO Medal for service with ISAF

Military offices
Preceded by Michael T. Franken	Deputy Commander of the United States Africa Command; 2017–2020	Succeeded by Kirk W. Smith
