= John W. Brennan =

U.S. Army general

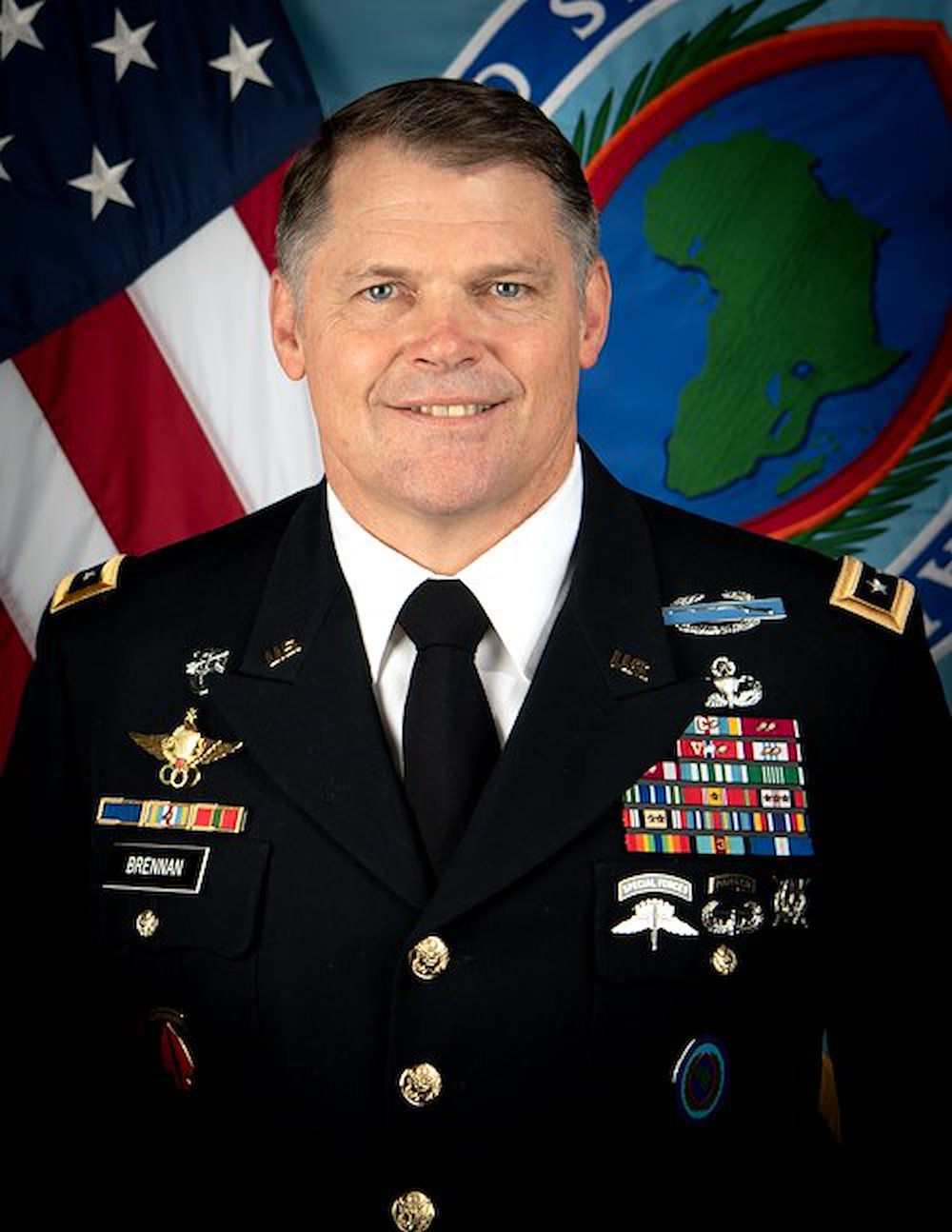
- Official portrait, 2024
- Born: c. 1968 (age 57–58)
- Education: North Carolina State University (BS)
- Military career
- Allegiance: United States
- Branch: United States Army
- Service years: 1990–present
- Rank: Lieutenant General
- Commands: Combined Joint Task Force – Operation Inherent Resolve; 1st Special Forces Command (Airborne); 5th Special Forces Group
- Conflicts: War in Afghanistan; Iraq War; War against the Islamic State; Operation Inherent Resolve
- Awards: Defense Superior Service Medal (2); Legion of Merit (3); Bronze Star Medal (6)

John W. Brennan Jr. (born c. 1968) is a United States Army lieutenant general who has served as the deputy commander of United States Africa Command since April 2024. He has previously served as director of operations of the United States Special Operations Command from October 2022 to July 2023, commander of the Combined Joint Task Force - Operation Inherent Resolve from September 2021 to September 2022, Commanding General of the 1st Special Forces Command (Airborne) from November 2019 to August 2021, and as the Deputy Commander of Joint Special Operations Command.

He was the commander of the 5th Special Forces Group from August 2013 to July 2015. In March 2023, Brennan was nominated for promotion to lieutenant general with assignment as the deputy commander of United States Africa Command.

A career Special Forces officer, Brennan was commissioned in 1990 via the Army Reserve Officers' Training Corps from North Carolina State University with a Bachelor of Science degree in Aerospace Engineering. His assignments included as commander, SFOD-A; commander, 1st Battalion, 3rd Special Forces Group; S-3 officer, troop commander, squadron operations officer, and squadron commander, 1st Special Forces Operational Detachment–Delta (Delta Force); deputy J33, Joint Special Operations Command; executive officer to the Commander of Army Special Operations Command; deputy commander of the Combined Joint Special Operations Task Force–Afghanistan; and chief of staff and deputy commander of Special Operations Command. Brennan commanded the Combined Joint Special Operations Task Force–Syria; and the Train, Advise, Assist Command East.

== Awards and decorations ==

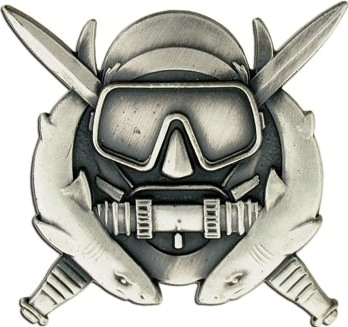

Badge	Combat Infantryman Badge		
Badge	Master Parachutist Badge		
1st row	Defense Superior Service Medal with 2 bronze Oak leaf clusters (2 awards)		
2nd row	Legion of Merit with 2 bronze Oak leaf clusters (3 awards)	Bronze Star with "V" device and 1 silver Oak leaf cluster (6 awards, including 1 for valor)	Defense Meritorious Service Medal with 2 bronze Oak leaf clusters (3 awards)
3rd row	Meritorious Service Medal with 1 bronze Oak leaf cluster (2 awards)	Joint Service Commendation Medal	Army Commendation Medal
4th row	Army Achievement Medal	National Defense Service Medal with 1 bronze Service star	Afghanistan Campaign Medal with 1 bronze Campaign star
5th row	Iraq Campaign Medal with 2 bronze Campaign stars	Inherent Resolve Campaign Medal with 2 bronze Campaign stars	Global War on Terrorism Expeditionary Medal
6th row	Global War on Terrorism Service Medal	Army Service Ribbon	Army Overseas Service Ribbon
Tabs	Special Forces Tab		Ranger Tab
Badges	Military Freefall Parachutist Badge	Air Assault Badge	Special Operations Diver Badge

Military offices
Preceded by	Commander of the 5th Special Forces Group; 2013–2015	Succeeded by Kevin C. Leahy
Preceded by Steven W. Gilland	Deputy Commanding General for Operations of the 101st Airborne Division; 2017–2019	Succeeded by David C. Foley
Preceded by Mark C. Schwartz	Deputy Commander of the Joint Special Operations Command; 2019	Succeeded by Richard E. Angle
Preceded by E. John Deedrick	Commanding General of the 1st Special Forces Command (Airborne); 2019–2021	Succeeded by Richard E. Angle
Preceded by Paul T. Calvert	Commander of Combined Joint Task Force – Operation Inherent Resolve; 2021–2022	Succeeded by Matthew W. McFarlane
Preceded by Vincent K. Becklund	Director of Operations of the United States Special Operations Command; 2022–2023	Succeeded by Michael E. Martin
Preceded by Kirk W. Smith	Deputy Commander of the United States Africa Command; 2024–present	Incumbent
