= Richard E. Angle =

American army officer

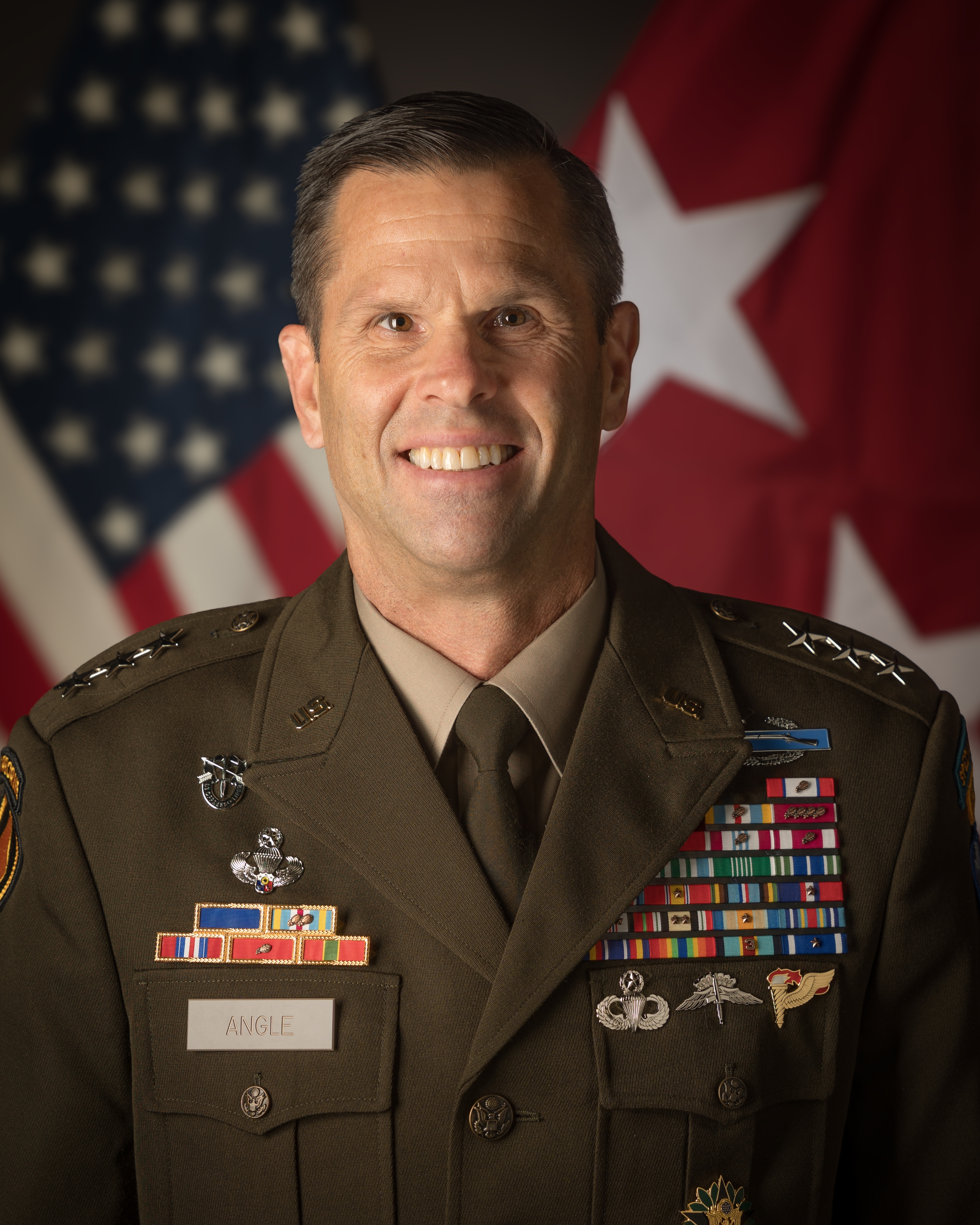
- Official portrait, 2024
- Education: United States Military Academy
- Military career
- Allegiance: United States
- Branch: United States Army
- Service years: 1991–present
- Rank: Lieutenant General
- Commands: Allied Special Operations Forces Command; Special Operations Command Europe; 1st Special Forces Command (Airborne); Intelligence Support Activity; 1st Battalion, 1st Special Forces Group
- Conflicts: Iraq War; War in Afghanistan; Operation Inherent Resolve
- Awards: Defense Superior Service Medal (3); Legion of Merit (4); Bronze Star Medal (2)

Richard E. Angle is a United States Army lieutenant general who has served as the commander of Allied Special Operations Forces Command and Special Operations Command Europe since 4 October 2024. He served as the commanding general of the 1st Special Forces Command (Airborne) from 2021 to 2023.

== Military career and education ==
Angle was commissioned as a second lieutenant in 1991 following graduation from United States Military Academy at West Point. His first assignment was with the 1st Battalion, 4th Infantry Regiment in Germany as an infantry officer. Angle volunteered for Army Special Forces and subsequently graduated from the Special Forces Qualification Course at Fort Bragg, North Carolina. Angle commanded a Special Forces Operational Detachment of the 2nd Battalion, 10th Special Forces Group, with which he deployed to Bosnia and Kosovo.

Following graduation from the Army Command and General Staff College, Angle was selected for the Intelligence Support Activity in 2000, a secret unit conducting signal and human intelligence gathering for the Joint Special Operations Command. He served as troop commander, squadron operations officer, unit operations officer, and later squadron commander. Angle took command of the 1st Battalion, 1st Special Forces Group in Okinawa, Japan from 2008 to 2010. He later returned to ISA as unit commander from 2012 to 2014. Angle completed numerous deployments to Afghanistan, Africa, Pakistan, and Iraq. Angle then received assignment as Chief of Staff, U.S. Army Special Operations Command in 2017.

As a general officer, Angle served as Deputy Commanding General, 1st Special Forces Command; Deputy Commanding General (Operations), United States Army Cyber Command; and then as Deputy Commander, Joint Special Operations Command. In March 2021, he was assigned to succeed John W. Brennan Jr. as Commanding General, 1st Special Forces Command (Airborne).

In September 2024, Angle was nominated for promotion to lieutenant general, with assignment as commander, Allied Special Operations Forces Command; and commander, Special Operations Command Europe, U.S. Special Operations Command, Belgium.

== Awards and decorations ==
U.S. military decorations
Defense Superior Service Medal
Legion of Merit with three oak leaf clusters
Bronze Star Medal
Defense Meritorious Service Medal with four oak leaf clusters
Meritorious Service Medal with oak leaf cluster
Army Commendation Medal
Army Achievement Medal
U.S. Unit Awards
Joint Meritorious Unit Award
Valorous Unit Award
Meritorious Unit Commendation
Superior Unit Award
U.S. Service (Campaign) Medals and Service and Training Ribbons
National Defense Service Medal with one bronze service star
Armed Forces Expeditionary Medal
Kosovo Campaign Medal with two service stars
Iraq Campaign Medal with two service stars
Afghanistan Campaign Medal with two service stars
Inherent Resolve Campaign Medal with service star
Global War on Terrorism Expeditionary Medal
Global War on Terrorism Service Medal
Armed Forces Service Medal
Army Service Ribbon
NATO Medal
Army Overseas Service Ribbon with bronze award numeral 3

Badges
Combat Infantryman Badge
Special Forces Tab
Ranger tab
Master Parachutist Badge
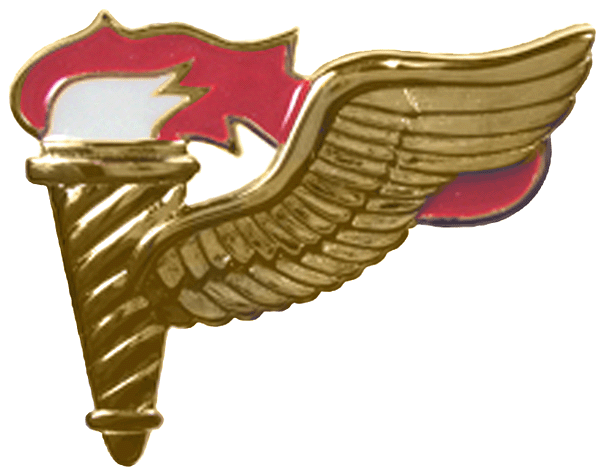
Pathfinder Badge
Military Freefall Badge
Joint Chiefs of Staff Identification Badge
Army Staff Identification Badge
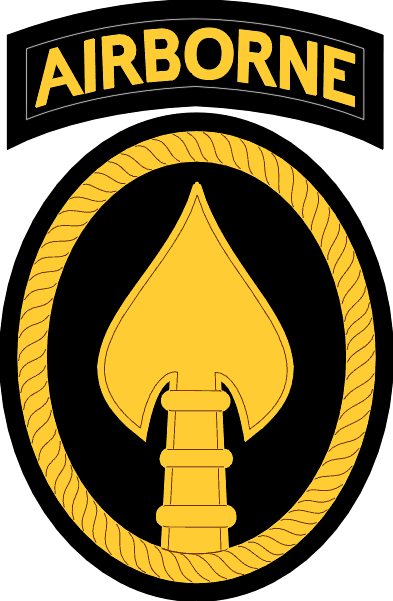
United States Special Operations Command Combat Service Identification Badge
1st Special Forces Command (Airborne) Distinctive Unit Insignia
8 Overseas Service Bars

Military offices
Preceded by Joseph P. McGee	Deputy Commanding General for Operations of the United States Army Cyber Command; 2018–2019	Succeeded by Jeth B. Rey
Preceded by John W. Brennan Jr.	Deputy Commander of the Joint Special Operations Command; 2019–2021	Succeeded by Sean M. Farrell
Preceded by John W. Brennan Jr.	Commanding General of the 1st Special Forces Command (Airborne); 2021–2023	Succeeded by Lawrence G. Ferguson
Preceded by Antonio Fletcher	Commander of the Allied Special Operations Forces Command; 2024–present	Incumbent
Preceded by Joseph G. Lock	Commander of Special Operations Command Europe; 2024–present	Incumbent
