= David H. Tabor =

U.S. Air Force general

Lieutenant General David H. Tabor
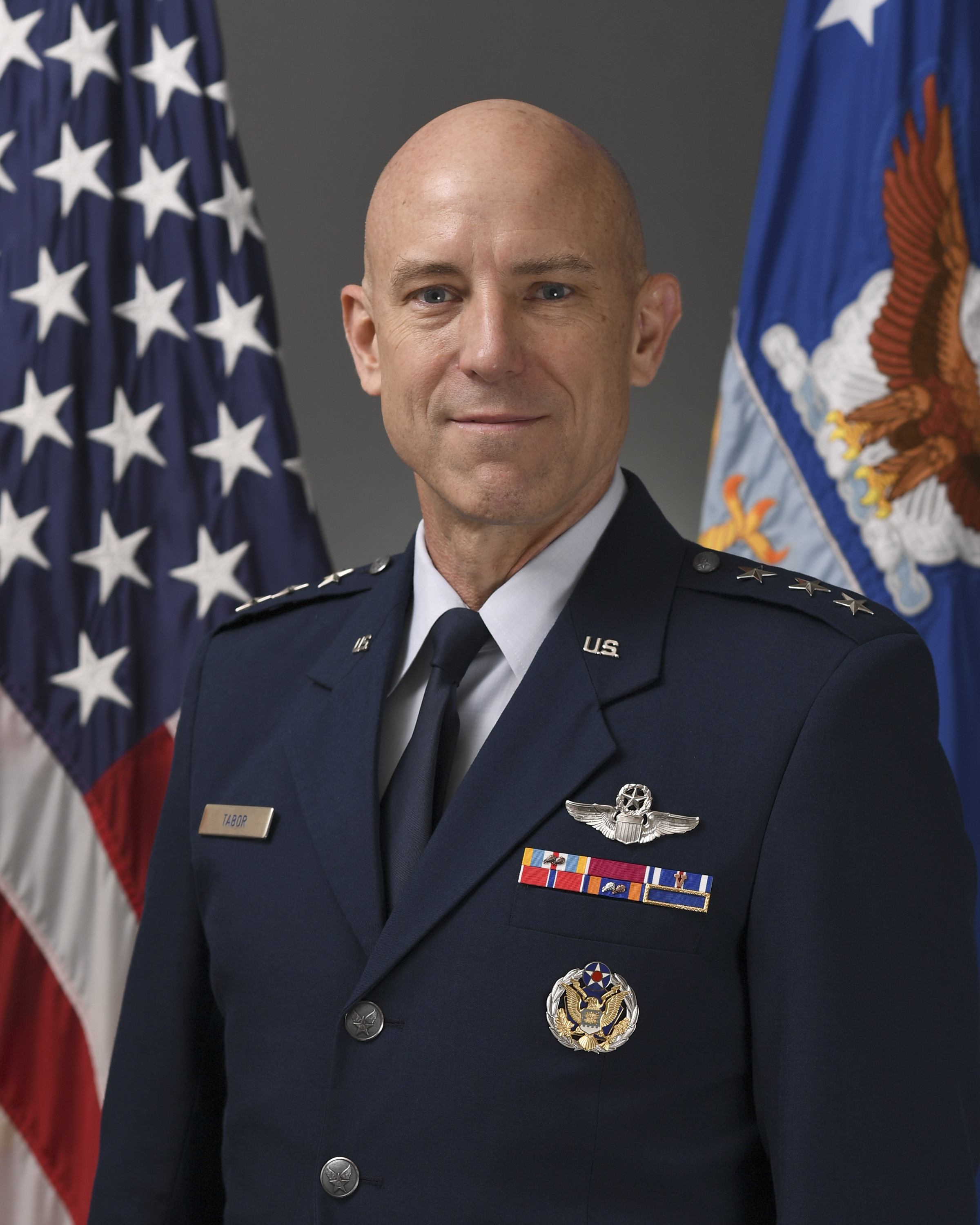
- Official portrait, 2024
- Education: Birmingham–Southern College (BA); Joint Forces Staff College (MS); United States Army War College (MS)
- Military career
- Allegiance: United States
- Branch: United States Air Force
- Service years: 1990–present
- Rank: Lieutenant General
- Commands: Special Operations Command Europe; Air Force Special Operations Air Warfare Center; Aviation Tactics Evaluation Group; 438th Air Expeditionary Advisory Group; 6th Special Operations Squadron
- Conflicts: War in Afghanistan
- Awards: Defense Superior Service Medal (3); Legion of Merit; Distinguished Flying Cross; Bronze Star Medal

David H. Tabor is a United States Air Force lieutenant general who serves as the deputy chief of staff for plans and programs of the Air Force. He previously served as the director of programs of the Air Force. He also served as the commander of the Special Operations Command Europe and as the assistant commanding general of the Joint Special Operations Command.

== Military career ==
In June 2022, it was announced that Tabor would succeed Richard G. Moore as director of programs of the United States Air Force. In May 2024, he was nominated for promotion to lieutenant general and assignment as deputy chief of staff for plans and programs of the United States Air Force.

Military offices
Preceded by Dan Caine	Assistant Commanding General of the Joint Special Operations Command; 2018–2020	Succeeded by Benjamin Maitre
Preceded by Kirk W. Smith	Commander of the Special Operations Command Europe; 2020–2022	Succeeded by Steven G. Edwards
Preceded by Richard G. Moore	Director of Programs of the United States Air Force; 2022–2024	Succeeded by Mark B. Pye
Preceded by Richard G. Moore	Deputy Chief of Staff for Plans and Programs of the United States Air Force; 2024–present	Incumbent
