= Mark C. Schwartz =

U.S. Army general

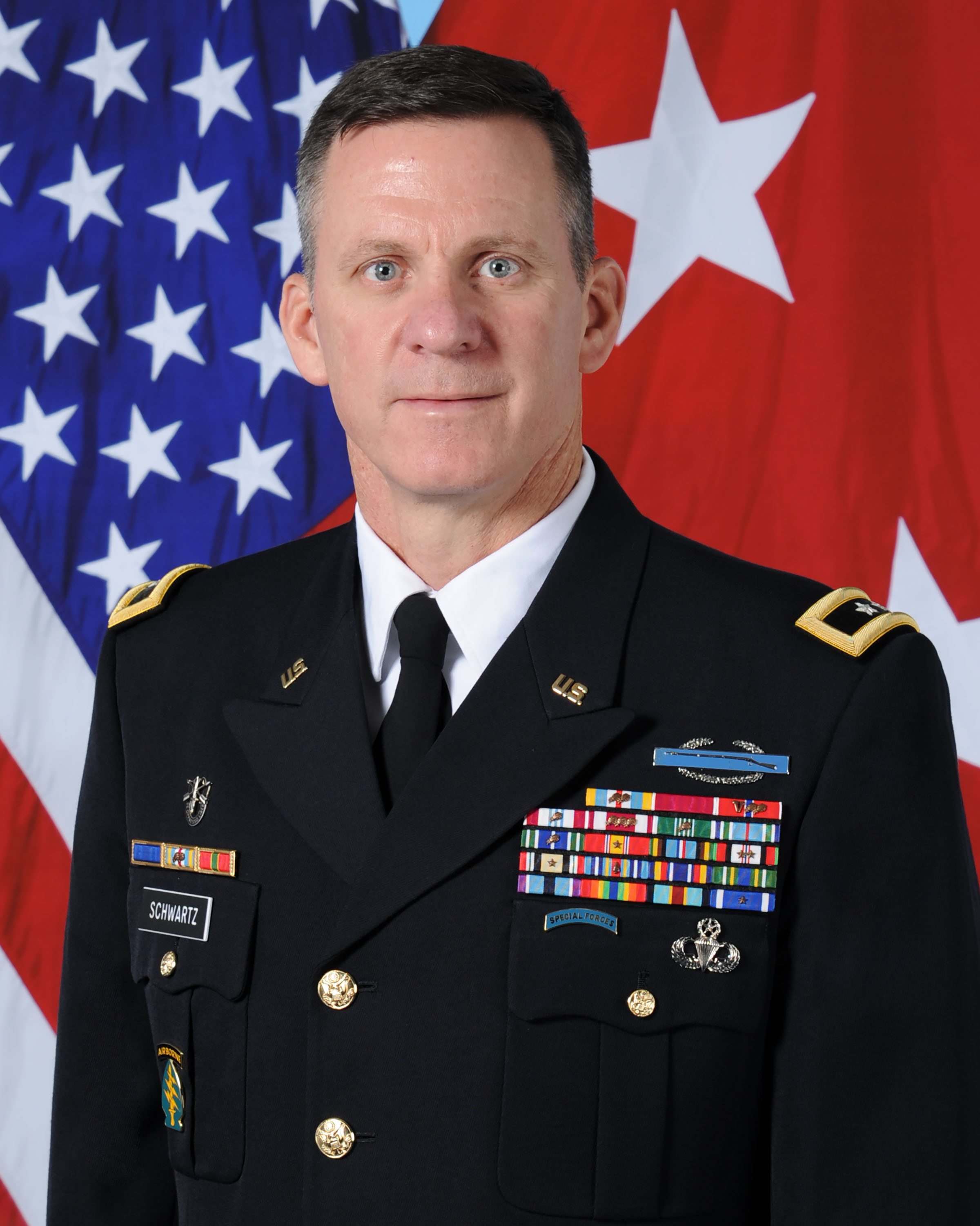
- Military career
- Allegiance: United States
- Branch: United States Army
- Service years: 1987–2021
- Rank: Lieutenant General
- Commands: Special Operations Command Europe; Combined Joint Special Operations Task Force – Afghanistan; 3rd Special Forces Group; 4th Battalion, 1st Special Warfare Training Group
- Conflicts: War in Afghanistan; Iraq War
- Awards: Defense Superior Service Medal (3); Legion of Merit (2); Bronze Star Medal (3)

Mark C. Schwartz is a retired United States Army lieutenant general who last served as the United States Security Coordinator of the Israel-Palestinian Authority. Previously, he commanded the Combined Security Transition Command – Afghanistan. In November 2020, he was announced to replace Lieutenant General Eric Wendt as commander of the NATO Special Operations Headquarters, but the Senate did not take any action on his nomination.

Military offices
Preceded by Gregory Lengyel	Commander of the Special Operations Command Europe; 2016–2018	Succeeded by Kirk W. Smith
Preceded by ???	Deputy Commander of the Joint Special Operations Command; 2018–2019	Succeeded by John W. Brennan
Preceded by Eric P. Wendt	United States Security Coordinator of the Israel-Palestinian Authority; 2019–2021	Succeeded by Michael R. Fenzel
