= Inside Combat Rescue =

American docuseries

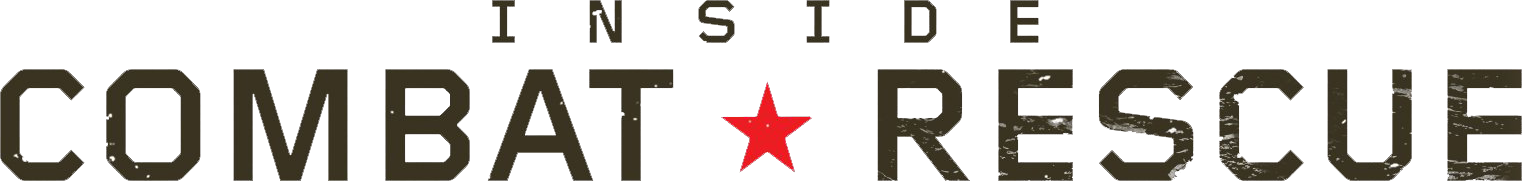
- Genre: Docuseries
- Country of origin: United States
- Original language: English
- No. of seasons: 2
- No. of episodes: 9

Production
- Camera setup: Multiple
- Running time: 45 minutes

Original release
- Network: National Geographic Channel
- Release: February 18, 2013 – June 28, 2016

Inside Combat Rescue is a television series that originally aired on the National Geographic Channel. The show covers U.S. Air Force Pararescuemen (PJs), who rescue American and Allied personnel and civilians while on deployment at Kandahar Airfield in Afghanistan.

The second season, consisting of three episodes and released over two years later, covers USAF Security Forces in Afghanistan.

== Episodes ==
=== Season 1 ===
No. overall	No. in season	Title	Original release date
1	1	"Visions of War"	February 18, 2013
The PJs take on enemy fire while rescuing two American soldiers from an active battlefield in Kandahar.
2	2	"Whatever It Takes"	February 25, 2013
The 38th Rescue Squadron of Moody Air Force Base in Georgia say goodbye to their families before they leave for Afghanistan.
3	3	"Into the Fire"	March 4, 2013
The PJs can't land until landmines in the area are cleared, jeopardizing the life of an Afghan soldier who has lost their leg.
4	4	"In the Crossfire"	March 11, 2013
Two Afghan allies need to be airlifted. One of the guns on their helicopter breaks while in the air, so the PJs must find a way to safely land.
5	5	"Fog of War"	March 18, 2013
One PJ, Chris, is eager to prove himself and save lives.
6	6	"Coming Home"	March 25, 2013
Only weeks are left in their deployment. A Taliban bomber detonates a bomb on a motorcycle near Kandahar.

=== Season 2 ===
No. overall	No. in season	Title	Original release date
7	1	"The Golden Hour"	May 17, 2015
8	2	"This Is a Nightmare"	November 9, 2015
9	3	"Into the Hot Zone"	June 28, 2016

== Production ==
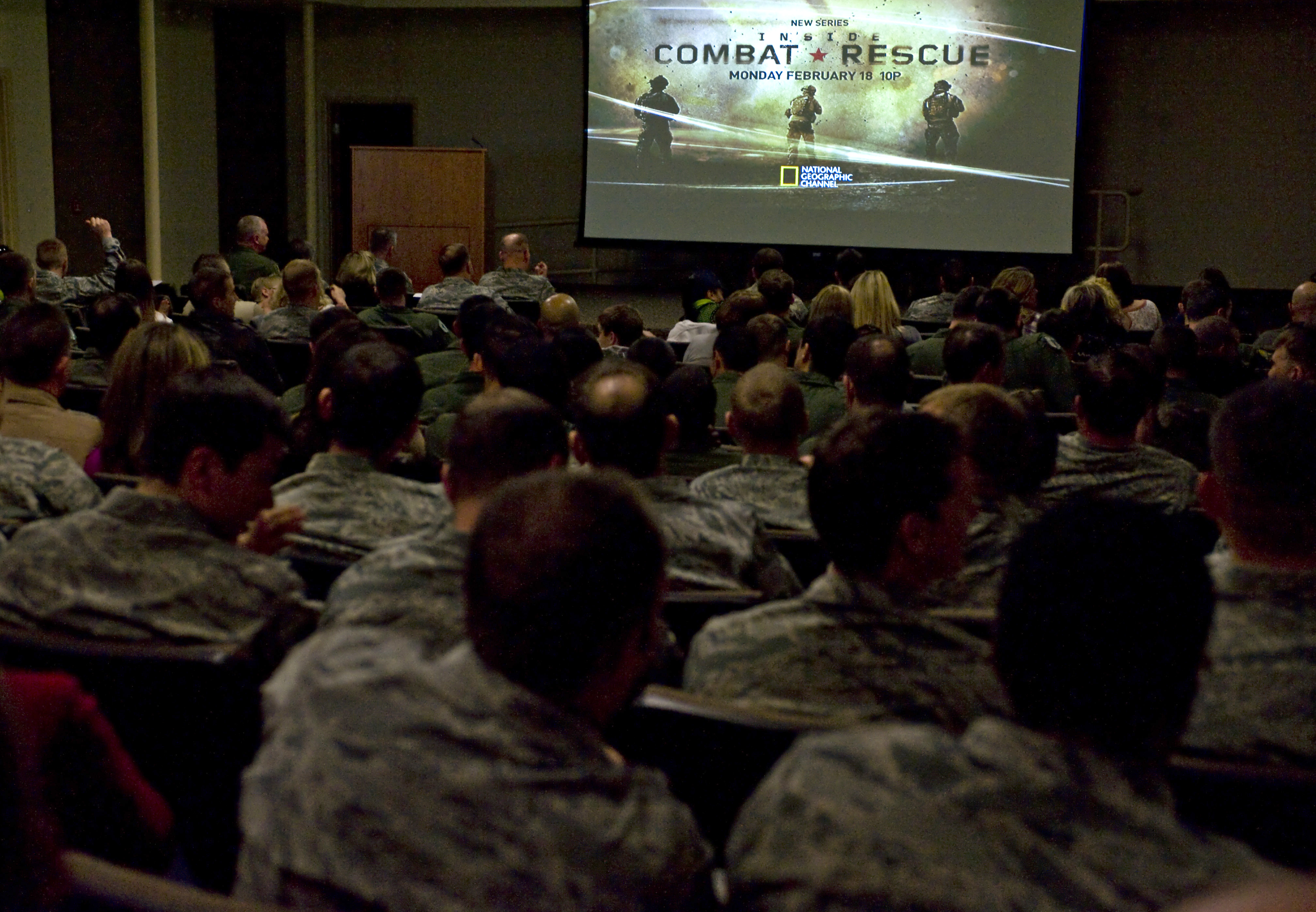
Airmen and their families attend the show's premiere at Nellis Air Force Base, Nevada

Footage was captured from more than 50 cameras mounted on the inside and outside of the Air Force's helicopters as well as the airmen's helmets.
