= Sean M. Farrell =

U.S. Air Force general

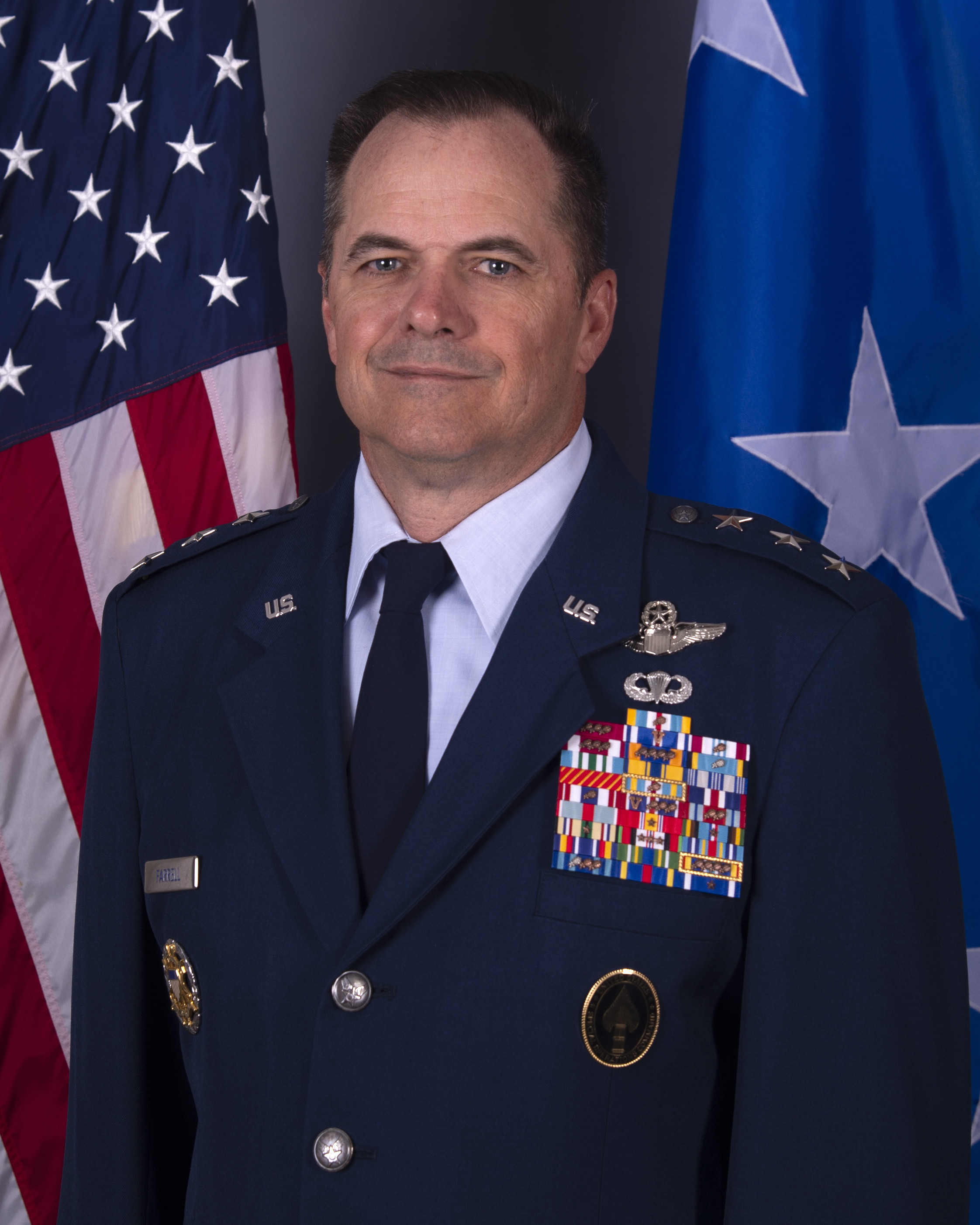
- Military career
- Allegiance: United States
- Branch: United States Air Force
- Service years: 1990–present
- Rank: Lieutenant General
- Commands: 1st Special Operations Wing; 27th Special Operations Group; 16th Special Operations Squadron
- Conflicts: War in Afghanistan
- Awards: Defense Superior Service Medal; Legion of Merit (3); Distinguished Flying Cross

Sean M. Farrell is a United States Air Force lieutenant general who has served as the deputy commander of United States Special Operations Command since March 2024. He most recently served as the deputy commanding general of the Joint Special Operations Command from 2021 to 2024. He previously served as director of force structure, requirements, resources, and strategic assessments of the United States Special Operations Command.

In September 2023, Farrell was nominated for promotion to lieutenant general.

== Awards and decorations ==

USAF Command Pilot wings
U.S Army Basic Parachutist Badge
Defense Superior Service Medal with bronze oak leaf cluster
| Legion of Merit with three bronze oak leaf clusters | Distinguished Flying Cross with "V" device | Defense Meritorious Service Medal with bronze oak leaf cluster |
| Meritorious Service Medal with three bronze oak leaf clusters | Air Medal with four bronze oak leaf clusters | Aerial Achievement Medal with silver oak leaf cluster |
| Joint Service Commendation Medal | Air and Space Commendation Medal | Air and Space Achievement Medal |
| Air Force Combat Action Medal | Joint Meritorious Unit Award with bronze oak leaf cluster | Gallant Unit Citation |
| Meritorious Unit Award with bronze oak leaf cluster | Air and Space Outstanding Unit Award with "V" device and three bronze oak leaf clusters | Combat Readiness Medal with two bronze oak leaf clusters |
| Air and Space Recognition Ribbon | National Defense Service Medal with bronze service star | Armed Forces Expeditionary Medal with bronze service star |
| Southwest Asia Service Medal with bronze service star | Afghanistan Campaign Medal with three bronze service stars | Global War on Terrorism Expeditionary Medal |
| Global War on Terrorism Service Medal | Korea Defense Service Medal | Air Force Expeditionary Service Ribbon with four bronze oak leaf clusters and gold frame |
| Air and Space Longevity Service Award with silver oak leaf cluster and two bronze oak leaf clusters | Air Force Training Ribbon | NATO Medal for Yugoslavia with bronze service star |
United States Special Operations Command Emblem
Joint Chiefs of Staff Identification Badge

Military offices
| Preceded by William P. West | Commander of the 1st Special Operations Wing; 2015–2016 | Succeeded by Tom Palenske |
| Preceded by Kirk W. Smith | Director of Strategic Plans, Programs and Requirements of the Air Force Special Operations Command; 2016–2018 | Succeeded by David A. Harris Jr. |
| Preceded by Sean P. Swindell | Director of Force Structure, Requirements, Resources, and Strategic Assessments of the United States Special Operations Command; 2019–2021 | Succeeded by Benjamin R. Maitre |
| Preceded by Richard E. Angle | Deputy Commanding General of the Joint Special Operations Command; 2021–2024 | Succeeded by Justin R. Hoffman |
| Preceded by Collin P. Green | Deputy Commander of the United States Special Operations Command; 2024–present | Incumbent |
