= Special Operations Command Europe =

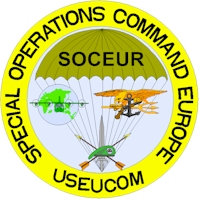
- Seal
- Active: 1986–present
- Country: United States
- Type: Special Operations
- Part of: U.S. European Command
- Headquarters: Patch Barracks, Germany
- Mottos: Latin: Semper preparate, lit. 'Always Prepared'

Commanders
- Commander: Lt. Gen. Richard E. Angle

Insignia
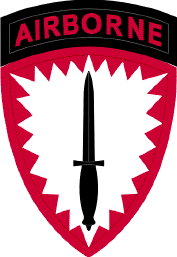
- Shoulder sleeve insignia

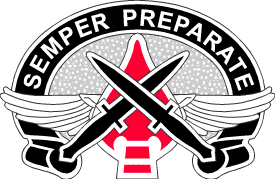
- Distinctive unit insignia

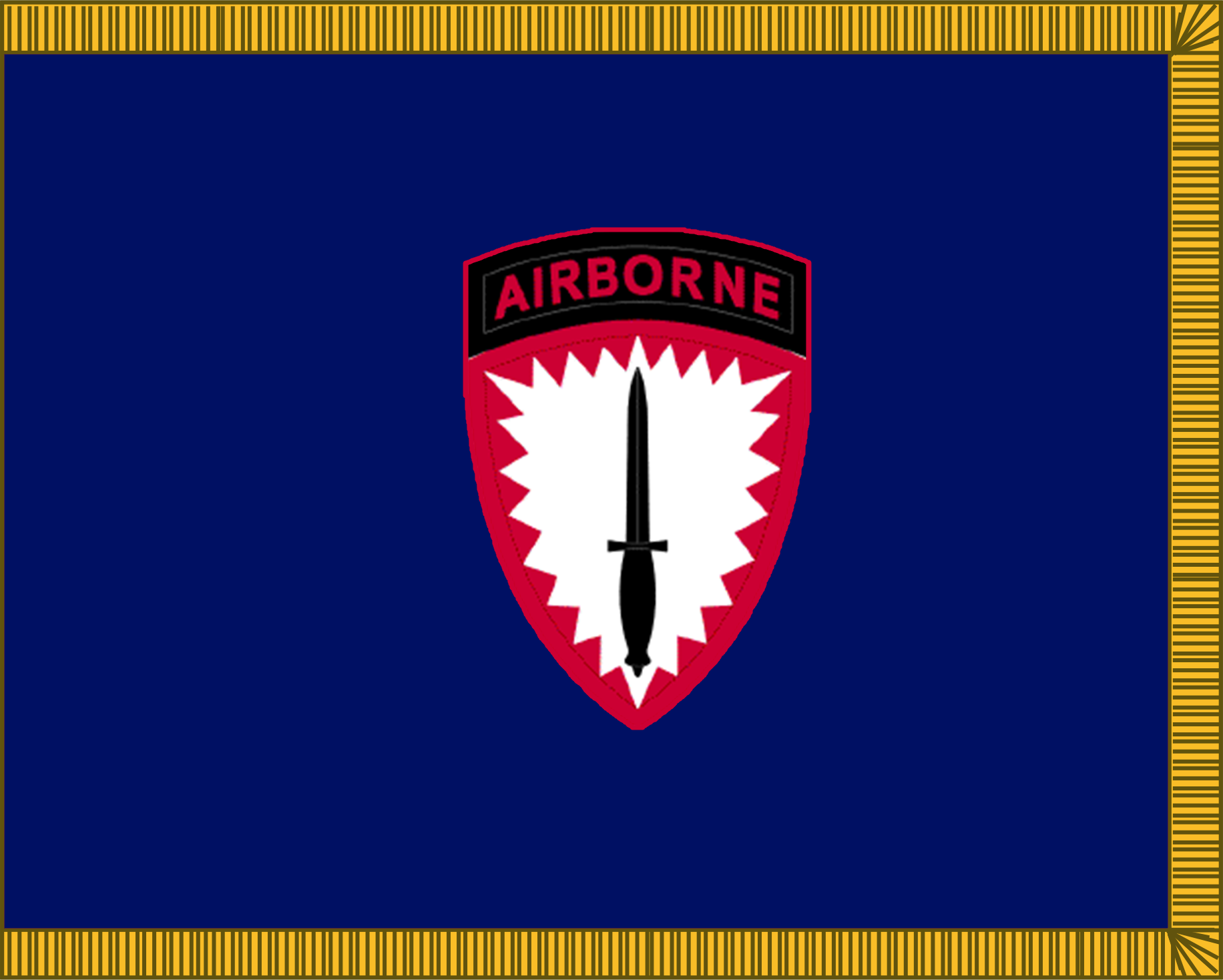
- Flag

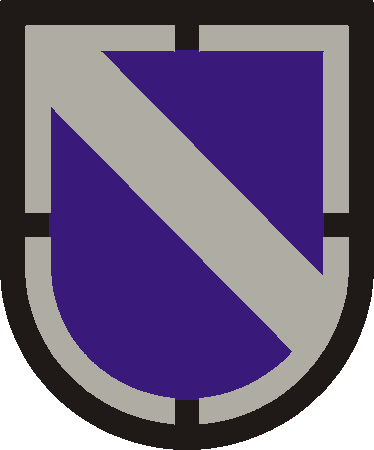
- Beret flash

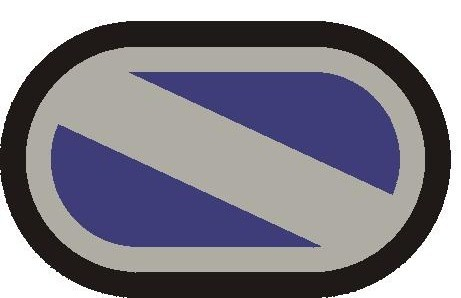
- Airborne background trimming
- Abbreviation: SOCEUR

The U.S. Special Operations Command Europe (SOCEUR, pronounced "Sock-Yer") is a subordinate unified command of United States Special Operations Command (SOCOM, pronounced So-Comm).

== Function ==
Based at Patch Barracks near Stuttgart, Germany, SOCEUR's function is to plan for use of Special Operations forces within EUCOM's area of responsibility, employ the forces, and assess whether they are achieving the desired results. SOCEUR conducts these activities as part of the US effort to strengthen the military capabilities and security of partner nations in Europe and counter threats to the US and its European partners.

=== Components ===
Forces of the United States Special Operations Command for which SOCEUR is responsible include: 1st Battalion, 10th Special Forces Group (Airborne); Naval Special Warfare Unit 2; 352d Special Operations Wing; and the SOCEUR Signal Detachment.

== Geographic focus ==
SOCEUR's area of responsibility is based on EUCOM's. It consists of 51 countries, and extends from Greenland to the European continent. It includes all of Russia, the Mediterranean Sea, and the Caucasus region.

== History ==
In 1955, the US European Command established Support Operations Command Europe to provide planning and operational control for Special Operations forces in the EUCOM area of responsibility. Later that year, EUCOM re-designated the new unit as Support Operations Task Force Europe (SOTFE).

When France withdrew from the North Atlantic Treaty Organization (NATO) in 1967, SOTFE moved from its headquarters in Paris to Panzer Kaserne near Stuttgart, West Germany. In 1968, SOTFE moved to Patch Barracks.

As part of the Goldwater-Nichols Act reforms, on May 30, 1986, SOCEUR was confirmed by the Joint Chiefs of Staff as a subordinate unified command of EUCOM and the EUCOM Special Operations Director took on the added role of SOCEUR commander

Originally focused on containment of the Union of Soviet Socialist Republics during the Cold War, after the Warsaw Pact ended in 1991 SOCEUR's focus shifted to other European countries, Africa and the Middle East. Since then, SOCEUR and its components have taken part in special operations during Operations Desert Storm, Provide Comfort and Provide Comfort II. In addition, prior to the creation of the US Africa Command (AFRICOM) and Special Operations Command Africa, SOCEUR took part in activities in Africa to include Silver Anvil (Sierra Leone) and Atlas Response (Mozambique). SOCEUR also participated in operations in the Balkans, including Joint Endeavor, Joint Guard, Allied Force, Operation Enduring Freedom, and Operation Iraqi Freedom.

== Commanders ==
Commanders of Special Operations Command Europe since its establishment as a EUCOM subordinate unified command include:

- James T. “Terry” Scott, July 1987 – September 1989
- Richard W. Potter Jr., September 1989 – July 1992
- Keith Kellogg, July 1992 – July 1994
- Michael A. Canavan, July 1994 – July 1996
- Geoffrey C. Lambert, August 1996 – July 1998
- Eldon A. Bargewell, August 1998 - June 2000
- Leslie L. Fuller, July 2000 – July 2002
- Gary M. Jones, July 2002 – August 2003
- Thomas R. Csrnko, August 2003 – June 2006
- William H. McRaven, June 2006 – March 2008
- Michael S. Repass (acting), March 2008 – May 2008
- Frank J. Kisner, May 2008 – July 2010
- Michael S. Repass, July 2010 – July 2013
- Marshall B. Webb, July 2013 – August 2014
- Gregory Lengyel, August 2014 – June 2016
- Mark C. Schwartz, June 2016 – June 2018
- Kirk W. Smith, June 2018 – August 2020
- David H. Tabor, August 2020 – June 2022
- Steven G. Edwards, June 28, 2022 – July 2024
- Joseph G. Lock, July 2024 – October 2024
- Richard E. Angle, October 2024 – present

== Sources ==
=== Internet ===
- Cunningham, Henry (May 15, 2003). "Special Forces gets new leader". The War at Home. SOCNET.com.
- Cook, Pamela A. Q. "U.S. Special Operations Command Europe commander departs". EUCOM.mil. Patch Barracks, Germany: United States European Command.
- Sparks, Donald. "Special Operations Command Europe holds change of command". EUCOM.mil. Patch Barracks, Germany: United States European Command.
- Bender, Terry (January 20, 2013). "Generals who rose from the ranks of the 14th Infantry: Lieutenant General James Terry Scott". i-kirk.info. 14th Infantry Regiment Association.
- Bailey, Daniel (January 28, 2014). "SOCEUR celebrates 59th Establishment Day". EUCOM.mil. Patch Barracks, Germany: United States European Command.
- Patterson, William (June 8, 2016). "Special Operations Command Europe Changes Leadership". SOCOM.mil. Patch Barracks, Germany: Special Operations Command Europe.
- "Our Forces: U.S. Special Operations Command Europe". EUCOM.mil. Patch Barracks, Germany: United States European Command.
- Vandiver, John (3 August 2020). "Special operations troops get a new boss in Stuttgart". Stars and Stripes.
- "Maj. Gen. (Select) Steven G. Edwards takes command of Special Operations Command Europe". DVIDS.
- "Brig. Gen. Joseph G. Lock takes command of Special Operations Command Europe". DVIDS. 2024-07-15.

=== News ===
- Atlas, Terry (April 10, 1996). "Evacuation of Americans Begins". Chicago Tribune. Chicago, IL.
- "In Uniform: Geoffrey C. Lambert". The Daily Press. Newport News, VA. November 7, 1996.
- Horn, Lisa (August 26, 2003). "Csrnko takes SOCEUR helm". Stars and Stripes. Washington, DC.
- "SOCEUR welcomes Webb as new commander". Stuttgart Citizen. Panzer Kaserne, Germany. August 7, 2013.
- Vandiver, John (June 8, 2016). "US special operators in Europe get new boss". Stars and Stripes. Washington, DC.
- Rhodes, Terrance (June 12, 2018). "US Special Operations Command Europe welcomes new commander". SOCOM.mil. MacDill Air Force Base, FL.
- SOFCOM Public Affairs Office (October 4, 2024). "Allied Special Operations Forces Command Holds Change of Command Ceremony". Allied Special Operations Forces Command News. Mons Belgium.

=== Magazines ===
- "Profile, Joseph Keith Kellogg, Jr". Intelligence Online. Paris, France: Indigo Publications. October 21, 1992.
- Bobick, Julia (September 1, 2002). "USAREC welcomes and farewells the Deputy Commanding General". The Recruiter Journal. Washington, DC: Department of the Army.

=== Books ===
- Schwartz, Norty (2018). Journey: Memoirs of an Air Force Chief of Staff. New York, NY: Skyhorse Publishing. ISBN 978-1-5107-1034-4.
- Special Operations Association (2006). Special Operations Association. Nashville, TN: Turner Publishing Company. ISBN 978-1-59652-156-8.
