= Alan Newman =

Alan Newman may refer to:

- Alan Newman (baseball)
- Alan Newman (entrepreneur)

== See also ==
- Allan Patterson Newman, American criminal and serial killer
