= Altreich =

Altreich or Altes Reich ("Old Empire") is a German term that may refer to:

- The medieval Kingdom of Germany, i.e. the territory of the German stem duchies excluding Saxony and Bavaria
- Altreich (pre-1938 Nazi Germany), those territories that were part of Nazi Germany before 1938
- The Holy Roman Empire, in contrast to the German Reich of 1871
- The Austrian Empire, as well as Austria-Hungary, by Austrian historians

Alt-Reich is a variation of the term alt-right and may refer to:

- Alt-Reich Nation, a racist Facebook group linked to the murder of Richard Collins III
