= Jessup Correctional Institution =

Correctional institution in Jessup, Maryland, US

- Location within Maryland
- Location: Jessup, Maryland; 39°8′40″N 76°46′40″W
- Status: Operational
- Security class: Maximum adult males
- Population: 1,396 (daily average) (2010)
- Opened: 1991
- Former name: Maryland House of Correction-Annex
- Managed by: Maryland Department of Public Safety and Correctional Services
- Warden: Robert Dean
- Website: Official website

Jessup Correctional Institution (JCI) is a maximum security prison operated by the Maryland Department of Public Safety and Correctional Services in Jessup, Maryland. It was formerly called the Maryland House of Correction-Annex.

== Prisoners ==
In 2013, inmates from JCI helped remove asbestos from contaminated buildings at the Maryland House of Correction. A lifer at JCI, Larry Bratt, wrote about dying in prison. Inmates at JCI participated in the Beyond Scared Straight program. Inmates at JCI participate in the Prison Puppy Raising Program. A 2010 phone call to a college class by Marshall Conway, a former black panther in Baltimore, from inside JCI inspired an award-winning documentary, Comrade Sunshine.

One prisoner, Wes Moore, is one of the subjects of the 2010 book The Other Wes Moore by Westley "Wes" Moore, who shares a similar name.

== Education ==
Inmates have a library that they use for legal research and writing, writing letters, and other purposes.

JCI has a college program, called the Prison Scholars Program, run by Joshua Miller. Many of the courses in the JCI Prison Scholars Program are on philosophy. A chapter in "The Beautiful Prison" discusses a philosophy course run by Loyola University Professor Drew Leder and the scholars at JCI. The chapter is titled: "The Enlightened Prison: Drew Leder and the Jessup Correctional Institution Scholars."

Starting in August 2016, the University of Baltimore has begun offering bachelor's degrees JCI prisoners in Community Studies and Civic Engagement. This program is a part of the US Department of Education's Second Chance Pell Experiment, which involves 66 other universities. However, University of Baltimore is the first to implement the program.

== Notable incidents ==
In 2008, Kelvin Poke, a man who was serving a life sentence at JCI, escaped from a local hospital and was killed by police.

In 2012, a man killed his cellmate and eventually pleaded guilty to the crime.

In 2015, three correctional officers were placed on administrative leave after an inmate was found dead inside a cell full of steam. Visits were halted after an outbreak of an illness. A former JCI guard was suspected of shootings in Maryland.

In August 2016, an inmate was stabbed to death by other inmates in the F building. Officers responded to the call of a fight around 10 AM and found the victim, John A. O'Sullivan lying on the floor with multiple stab and puncture wounds.

In May 2023, Nicholas Joseph Delfosse, an inmate at JCI, was found in his cell with multiple injuries. An autopsy revealed Delfosse was stabbed to death and his death was ruled a homicide.

== Notable inmates ==
Inmate Name	Register Number	Status	Details
Willie Horton	1019284 / 189182	Serving a life sentence.	Convicted murderer who is best known for his crimes being noted in an ad during the George H. W. Bush 1988 presidential campaign.
Sean Urbanski	4511249 / 00481576	Serving a life sentence.	Perpetrator of the 2017 Murder of Richard Collins III in which he was stabbed to death by Urbanski on the University of Maryland, College Park campus.
