= Leahy Laws =

American human rights law

United States Congress
- Long title: U.S. statutory provisions prohibiting assistance to foreign security force units credibly implicated in gross violations of human rights.
- Citation: 22 U.S.C. § 2378d (State Department version); 10 U.S.C. § 362 (Department of Defense version)
- Territorial extent: United States
- Enacted: First enacted as an annual appropriations provision on November 26, 1997; codified permanently in the Foreign Assistance Act on December 26, 2007; Department of Defense version codified at Title 10 on December 23, 2016.
- Administered by: United States Department of State (Bureau of Democracy, Human Rights, and Labor); United States Department of Defense
- Introduced by: Patrick Leahy (principal sponsor of original amendment)

Amended by
- Pub. L. 112–74 (2011); Pub. L. 113–76 (2014); Pub. L. 117–103 (2022)

Summary
- Bars U.S. security assistance to any foreign security force unit for which the Secretary of State (or Secretary of Defense, for DoD-funded programs) has credible information of a gross violation of human rights, unless the foreign government takes effective steps to bring responsible members to justice; requires vetting of intended recipients.

Keywords
- Human rights; security assistance; vetting; GVHR

Text of statute as originally enacted

Revised text of statute as amended
- Status: In force

The Leahy Laws or Leahy amendments are U.S. human rights laws that prohibit the U.S. Department of State and Department of Defense from providing military assistance to foreign security force units that violate human rights with impunity. It is named after its principal sponsor, Senator Patrick Leahy (D-Vermont).

To implement this law, the U.S. embassies, the Bureau of Democracy, Human Rights, and Labor, and the appropriate regional bureau of the U.S. Department of State vet potential recipients of security assistance. If a unit is found to have been credibly implicated in a serious abuse of human rights, assistance is denied until the host nation government takes effective steps to bring the responsible persons within the unit to justice. While the U.S. government does not publicly report on foreign armed forces units it has cut off from receiving assistance, press reports have indicated that security force and national defense force units in Australia, Bangladesh, Bolivia, Colombia, Guatemala, Mexico, Nigeria, Turkey, Indonesia, Lebanon, and Saint Lucia have been denied assistance due to the Leahy Law. On the other hand, Israel and Saudi Arabia have never been denied assistance under this law.

== Origins and background ==
Senator Leahy first introduced this law in 1997 as part of the Foreign Operations Appropriations Act. It initially referred only to counter-narcotics assistance for one year. The next year, with his leadership, Congress expanded it to cover all State Department funded assistance. This provision was included in all annual Foreign Operations budget laws until 2008. At that time Congress made the law permanent by amending it into the Foreign Assistance Act. In 2011, Congress revised the law substantially, seeking to enhance its implementation.

The United States government has long been a major, if not the largest, provider of assistance—including funding, training, non-lethal equipment, and weaponry—to foreign military and other security forces. In 2012 it spent $25 billion on training and equipping foreign militaries and law enforcement agencies of more than 100 countries around the world. Security assistance is driven by overriding U.S. national security objectives, including a desire to challenge/overturn communist regimes during the Cold War, counter drug trafficking in the 1990s, or counter anti-Western terrorism in the 2000s. Throughout the United States' long history of providing assistance to foreign armed forces, some portion of this assistance has been provided to forces that repress and abuse their own populations. According to Senator Leahy, his law "makes it clear that when credible evidence of human rights violations exists, U.S. aid must stop. But, it provides the necessary flexibility to allow the U.S. to advance its foreign policy objectives in these countries."

== Text of the laws ==
U.S. assistance to foreign armed forces comes from two different budgets; therefore, two separate versions of the Leahy amendment have been enacted into law. One covers assistance to foreign forces funded through the State Department foreign assistance budget, and another covers assistance funded out of the Department of Defense budget.

The law covering State Department funded aid is found in Section 620M of the Foreign Assistance Act of 1961 (as amended most recently in January 2014). It states:

(a) IN GENERAL. – No assistance shall be furnished under this Act or the Arms Export Control Act to any unit of the security forces of a foreign country if the Secretary of State has credible information that such unit has committed a gross violation of human rights.

(b) EXCEPTION. – The prohibition in subsection (a) shall not apply if the Secretary determines and reports to the Committee on Foreign Relations of the Senate, the Committee on Foreign Affairs of the House of Representatives, and the Committees on Appropriations that the government of such country is taking effective steps to bring the responsible members of the security forces unit to justice.

(c) DUTY TO INFORM. – In the event that funds are withheld from any unit pursuant to this section, the Secretary of State shall promptly inform the foreign government of the basis for such action and shall, to the maximum extent practicable, assist the foreign government in taking effective measures to bring the responsible members of the security forces to justice.

(d) CREDIBLE INFORMATION. The Secretary shall establish, and periodically update, procedures to

(1) ensure that for each country the Department of State has a current list of all security force units receiving United States training, equipment, or other types of assistance;

(2) facilitate receipt by the Department of State and United States embassies of information from individuals and organizations outside the United States Government about gross violations of human rights by security force units;

(3) routinely request and obtain such information from the Department of Defense, the Central Intelligence Agency, and other United States Government sources;

(4) ensure that such information is evaluated and preserved;

(5) ensure that when an individual is designated to receive United States training, equipment, or other types of assistance the individual's unit is vetted as well as the individual;

(6) seek to identify the unit involved when credible information of a gross violation exists but the identity of the unit is lacking; and

(7) make publicly available, to the maximum extent practicable, the identity of those units for which no assistance shall be furnished pursuant to subsection (a).

The Department of Defense Appropriations version of the Leahy Law (10 U.S. Code § 2249e) reads:

(a) In General.—

(1) Of the amounts made available to the Department of Defense, none may be used for any training, equipment, or other assistance for a unit of a foreign security force if the Secretary of Defense has credible information that the unit has committed a gross violation of human rights.

(2) The Secretary of Defense shall, in consultation with the Secretary of State, ensure that prior to a decision to provide any training, equipment, or other assistance to a unit of a foreign security force full consideration is given to any credible information available to the Department of State relating to human rights violations by such unit.

(b) Exception.—The prohibition in subsection (a)(1) shall not apply if the Secretary of Defense, after consultation with the Secretary of State, determines that the government of such country has taken all necessary corrective steps, or if the equipment or other assistance is necessary to assist in disaster relief operations or other humanitarian or national security emergencies.

(c) Waiver.—The Secretary of Defense, after consultation with the Secretary of State, may waive the prohibition in subsection (a)(1) if the Secretary determines that the waiver is required by extraordinary circumstances.

(d) Procedures.—The Secretary of Defense shall establish, and periodically update, procedures to ensure that any information in the possession of the Department of Defense about gross violations of human rights by units of foreign security forces is shared on a timely basis with the Department of State.

(e) Report.—Not later than 15 days after the application of any exception under subsection (b) or the exercise of any waiver under subsection (c), the Secretary of Defense shall submit to the appropriate committees of Congress a report—

(1) in the case of an exception under subsection (b), providing notice of the use of the exception and stating the grounds for the exception; and

(2) in the case of a waiver under subsection (c), describing—

(A) the information relating to the gross violation of human rights;
(B) the extraordinary circumstances that necessitate the waiver;
(C) the purpose and duration of the training, equipment, or other assistance; and
(D) the United States forces and the foreign security force unit involved.

(f) Appropriate Committees of Congress Defined.—In this section, the term "appropriate committees of Congress" means—

(1) the Committee on Armed Services, the Committee on Foreign Relations, and the Committee on Appropriations of the Senate; and

(2) the Committee on Armed Services, the Committee on Foreign Affairs, and the Committee on Appropriations of the House of Representatives.

There are several key differences between the two versions of the law. First, the Department of Defense version includes a waiver that allows the Secretary of Defense – after consulting with the Secretary of State – to waive the requirements of the provision if "extraordinary circumstances" warrant it.

Another difference concerns what steps a government must take to resume assistance once a security force unit has been flagged for gross human rights violations. The Foreign Assistance Act version requires that the government of the country in question "is taking effective steps to bring the responsible members of the security forces unit to justice" while the Defense Department version prohibits assistance "unless all necessary corrective steps have been taken".

Leahy Law provisions are sometimes confused with human rights conditionality that applies to overall Foreign aid packages to a specific country, which is governed by the Foreign Assistance Act.

The Leahy Law applies only to assistance to specific units, and does not necessarily affect the level of assistance to a country, even when implemented. Human rights conditionality, on the other hand, typically requires a percentage of assistance to a country to be withheld until the Department of State certifies progress on certain human rights conditions.

== Vetting process ==
The U.S. government (via the State Department) implements the law through a process known as "Leahy vetting". A prospective aid recipient's unit is searched for evidence of past commission of gross human rights violations. The State Department has interpreted "gross human rights violations" to mean murder of non-combatants, torture, "disappearing" people, and rape as a tactic.

The government utilizes the International Vetting and Security Tracking (INVEST) system, which tracks all units and individuals who are potential recipients of assistance, including any information that suggests they are ineligible for assistance and any past determinations regarding their eligibility.

Vetting is done at several points in the approval process and by several elements of the State Department, starting at the U.S. embassy in the particular country and occurring at the Bureau of Democracy, Human Rights and Labor (DRL) and the appropriate regional bureau. When a vetter finds credible derogatory information, the information is entered into INVEST, triggering a review with all relevant bureaus. All assistance remains on hold until a final decision is reached.

If credible information is found implicating a unit in a gross violation of human rights, the unit will be prohibited from receiving assistance until remediation steps are taken. The law requires the U.S. government to offer assistance to the country's government in bringing those responsible to justice and remediate the sanctioned unit.

The process is, in general, not transparent; in June 2016, State Department Spokesperson John Kirby said department officials do not "speak to specific cases on Leahy vetting. We don't do that."

While there is no exact definition of what constitutes "credible" information, the State Department's standard is that it need not reach the same standard as would be required to admit evidence in a U.S. court of law. Vetters rely on a wide array of sources including the annual Department of State Country Reports on Human Rights, US government agency records, NGO human rights reports, and information garnered from the media.

Certain countries known as "Fast Track" countries are only required to be vetted at the embassy level. The State Department's Leahy Working Group determines by consensus which countries are eligible for Fast Track vetting. A Fast Track country has a "favorable human rights record, including no serious or systemic problems in the country's security forces and no widespread problems with impunity".

== Withholding of assistance ==
The U.S. government rarely publicizes decisions to deny assistance under the Leahy Law. The vast majority of requests for assistance are cleared immediately; in 2011, only 1,766 units and individuals out of approximately 200,000 were barred from receiving aid because of gross violations of human rights.

In 1998, financing from the Export-Import Bank was denied for thirty-nine of 140 armored police vehicles being bought by Turkey because those vehicles were destined for 11 provinces where police had been implicated in abuses of human rights. The manufacturer, General Dynamics, ultimately provided the financing for the thirty-nine vehicles.

Indonesia's elite Komando Pasukan Khusus (Kopassus) was subject to a 12-year ban on U.S. security assistance after it was implicated in a series of kidnappings and murders of activists in the late 1990s.

In 2010, outrage over extrajudicial killings committed by the armed forces of Pakistan led to the suspension of aid to "about a half-dozen" units of the Pakistani army.

A 2013, report by Freedom House described the Leahy Law as "an invaluable tool in preventing U.S. assistance to military or police units that commit human rights abuses" and added that "it is invoked sparingly and only in egregious cases of specific violence".

In 2014, Major General Paul Eaton (retired) spoke in support of the law, saying, "the value of the Leahy Law is that it serves as a moral guide to the application of U.S. military engagement. Some in the U.S. armed forces have argued that the law frustrates U.S. partnership at precisely the moment we need most to influence better behaviors. This dilemma has a solution embedded in the amendment itself, which provides that if human rights remediation has begun, U.S. assistance can be brought to bear."

Senator Leahy said of the law: "This is a law that works, if it is enforced ... We can help reform foreign security forces, but they need to show they are serious about accountability. If not, we are wasting American taxpayers' money and risk prolonging the abusive conduct that we seek to prevent."

== Criticisms of the law and its implementation ==
In 2013, several U.S. military commanders cited the law as interfering with their ability to train foreign forces. They claimed that the law was being applied too broadly.

Most criticism, however, has been that the law is too weak and is not enforced robustly enough. For instance, in 2011 Human Rights Watch reported that the U.S. "continued to aid and train Cambodia's armed forces including units with records of serious human rights violations such as Brigade 31, battalion 70 and Airborne Brigade 911 – in violation of the Leahy Law".

== The Leahy Law and Israel ==
While the Leahy Act should apply uniformly to all countries, experts say US has created a set of procedures — through what is known as the Israel Leahy Vetting Forum (ILVF) — that favor Israel. A number of observers have complained that the Leahy Act has not been enacted in response to what they have claimed are human rights abuses by the Israeli military. In 2011, Haaretz reported that Leahy, after being approached by constituents in Vermont, was pushing clauses that would bar aid to three elite Israeli military units that have been accused of human rights violations in the occupation of the West Bank and Gaza. A spokesman for Leahy denied this. Leahy's Senate webpage repeats his views that while "he has supported Israel's right to self-defense", "he disagrees with restrictions on imports of goods into Gaza as it amounts to collective punishment, with Israel's use of excessive force in Gaza which has caused the deaths of hundreds of civilians, and with home demolitions and settlement construction in the West Bank." In February 2016, 11 members of Congress, including Leahy, sent a letter to the State Department demanding a review of the Leahy Act be conducted after reports of extrajudicial killings by Israeli and Egyptian military forces.

In April 2024, ProPublica reported that Secretary of State Antony Blinken had refused to act on recommendations from the Israel Leahy Vetting Forum to sanction Israeli units that had participated in human rights violations including torture, rape, and extrajudicial killings in the West Bank. Charles Blaha, a former State Department official, explained that Israel receives special treatment under the Leahy law because the decision on any sanction is taken by the department's top political appointees rather than by career officials. Blaha stated that "information that for any other country would without question result in ineligibility is insufficient for Israeli security force units".

== See also ==
- Child Soldiers Protection Act
- Human rights in the United States
- United States security assistance to the Palestinian Authority
