= Michael R. Fenzel =

U.S. Army general

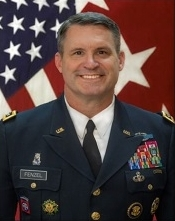
- Official portrait, 2022
- Born: 29 July 1967 (age 59)
- Military career
- Allegiance: United States
- Branch: United States Army
- Service years: 1989–present
- Rank: Lieutenant General
- Commands: United States Security Coordinator of the Israel-Palestinian Authority; 3rd Brigade Combat Team, 82nd Airborne Division; 2nd Brigade Combat Team, 1st Armored Division; 1st Battalion, 503rd Infantry Regiment
- Conflicts: Gulf War; Bosnian War; Liberian Civil War; War in Afghanistan (3); Iraq War
- Awards: Legion of Merit (2); Distinguished Superior Service Medal; Bronze Star Medal (4)

Michael R. Fenzel (born 29 July 1967) is a United States Army lieutenant general who served as the United States Security Coordinator for Israel and the Palestinian Authority from November 2, 2021. He most recently served as the vice director for strategy, plans, and policy of the Joint Staff (J5). Before serving in that position, he was the Military Deputy to the Special Representative for Afghanistan Reconciliation in the United States Department of State. During the attacks on 11 September 2001, Fenzel, as a major, served as a Director for Transnational Threats under Richard Clarke. He worked directly with Vice President Dick Cheney in the Presidential Emergency Operations Center throughout the crisis and liaised with Clarke.

In July 2021, Fenzel was nominated for promotion to lieutenant general and assignment as the United States Security Coordinator for Israel and the Palestinian Authority, replacing Mark C. Schwartz.

In 2025, a documentary alleged that U.S. officials had modified conclusions reached during a review of the 2022 killing of Palestinian American journalist Shireen Abu Akleh. Fenzel stated he stood by the integrity of his team's work and the findings and recommendations of the classified summation report.

He earned degrees from Johns Hopkins University (BA), U.S. Naval War College (MA), Harvard University (MPA), and Naval Postgraduate School (PhD).

== Early life and education ==
Fenzel graduated from Johns Hopkins University in May 1989, where he was a member of the Reserve Officers' Training Corps (ROTC) and commissioned into the infantry. He went on to earn a bachelor's degree in economics from Johns Hopkins University, master's degrees from the U.S. Naval War College and Harvard University, as well as a PhD in national security studies from the U.S. Naval Postgraduate School.

== Military career ==
Fenzel's military career spanned more than 36 years and included multiple combat deployments. During the Gulf War, on February 24, 1990, he led his platoon across the Saudi Arabian border "into a huge sandstorm and heavy fighting" as a 22-year-old platoon leader. He successfully brought all 35 of his soldiers back safely after four days of combat.

Following the Gulf War, Fenzel deployed to Bosnia in 1995–1996 as part of Operation Joint Endeavor. In 1996, he commanded a company of 170 soldiers that forcibly entered and defended the United States embassy in Monrovia, Liberia, during that nation's civil war (Operation Assured Response).

Fenzel was selected as a White House Fellow in 2000 and served as a Director of Transnational Threats through 2001, which included service in the White House's east wing "bunker" (President's Emergency Operations Center) through the terrorist attacks of September 11th, 2001.

He deployed to Iraq in 2003–2004 as part of Operation Iraqi Freedom, including the parachute assault into Bashur drop zone in the north, and subsequently completed multiple tours in Afghanistan. During Operation Enduring Freedom, he served as deputy commander of Combined Task Force Devil, and later as commander of Task Force Eagle (1st Battalion, 503rd Airborne) in eastern Paktika Province. Afterward, he served as the Director of Strategy (J5) for the NATO mission from 2017–2018 in Kabul. He then served as the military deputy to the special representative for Afghanistan reconciliation from 2018–2019.

Fenzel's later commands included serving as the commander of the 3rd Brigade, 82nd Airborne Division (and Global Response Force), then chief of staff for the 82nd Airborne Division, and finally as Deputy Commanding General for the Division at Fort Bragg. Prior to that, he commanded the 1st Armored Division's 2nd Brigade Combat Team. He also served as the Council on Foreign Relations' U.S. Army fellow from 2015–2016.

== Publications ==
In 2017, Fenzel wrote the book No Miracles: The Failure of Soviet Decision-Making in the Afghan War, published by Stanford University Press.

== Awards and decorations ==
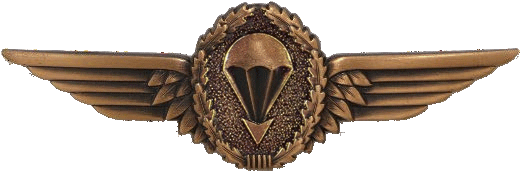
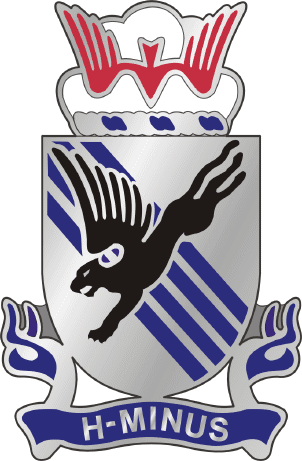
Combat Infantryman Badge with star (denoting 2nd award)
Expert Infantryman Badge
Ranger tab
Master Combat Parachutist Badge with one bronze jump star
Joint Chiefs of Staff Identification Badge
Presidential Service Badge
Army Staff Identification Badge
German Parachutist badge in bronze
505th Infantry Regiment Distinctive Unit Insignia
8 Overseas Service Bars

Legion of Merit with one bronze oak leaf cluster
Bronze Star Medal with "V" device and three oak leaf clusters
Defense Meritorious Service Medal with oak leaf cluster
Meritorious Service Medal with three oak leaf clusters
Army Commendation Medal with "V" device and three oak leaf clusters
Army Achievement Medal
National Defense Service Medal with one bronze service star
Armed Forces Expeditionary Medal with two service stars
Southwest Asia Service Medal
Afghanistan Campaign Medal with two service stars
Iraq Campaign Medal with three service stars
Global War on Terrorism Expeditionary Medal
Global War on Terrorism Service Medal
Armed Forces Service Medal
Humanitarian Service Medal
Army Service Ribbon
Army Overseas Service Ribbon
NATO Medal for the former Yugoslavia with service star
Kuwait Liberation Medal (Saudi Arabia)
Kuwait Liberation Medal (Kuwait)

Military offices
Preceded by Daryl L. Caudle	Vice Director for Strategy, Plans, and Policy of the Joint Staff; 2020–2021	Succeeded by Brett G. Sylvia
Preceded by Michael Eastman	Special Assistant to the Director of the Army Staff; 2021	Succeeded by Patrick Matlock
Preceded by Mark C. Schwartz	United States Security Coordinator of the Israel-Palestinian Authority; 2021–present	Incumbent
