= Wes Moore =

Governor of Maryland since 2023

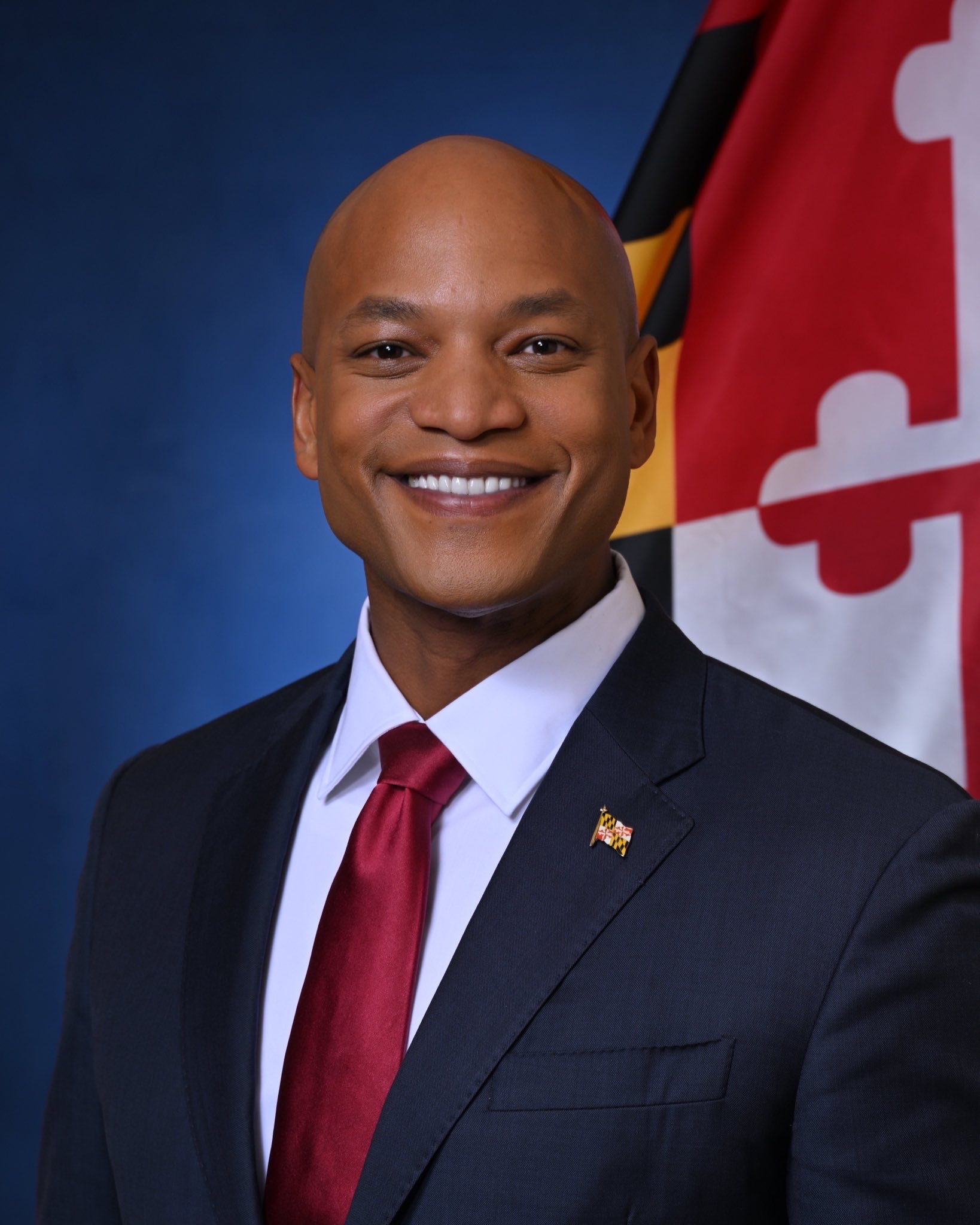
- Official portrait, 2023

63rd Governor of Maryland
- Incumbent
- Assumed office January 18, 2023
- Lieutenant: Aruna Miller
- Preceded by: Larry Hogan

Chair of the National Governors Association
- Incumbent
- Assumed office August 1, 2026
- Preceded by: Kevin Stitt

Personal details
- Born: Westley Watende Omari Moore; October 15, 1978 (age 48) Takoma Park, Maryland, U.S.
- Party: Democratic
- Spouse: Dawn Flythe (m. 2007)
- Children: 2
- Education: Valley Forge Military College (AA); Johns Hopkins University (BA); Wolfson College, Oxford (MLitt)
- Website: Office website Campaign website

Military service
- Branch: United States Army; Army Reserve
- Service years: 1998–2014
- Rank: Captain
- Unit: 82nd Airborne Division
- Conflict: War in Afghanistan
- Awards: Afghanistan Campaign Medal; Armed Forces Reserve Medal; Army Service Ribbon; Bronze Star Medal; Combat Action Badge; National Defense Service Medal; Parachutist Badge
- Wes Moore's voice Wes Moore on the response to the Francis Scott Key Bridge collapse Recorded April 5, 2024

Westley Watende Omari Moore (born October 15, 1978) is an American politician, businessman, author, and U.S. Army veteran serving as the 63rd governor of Maryland since 2023.

Moore was born in Maryland and raised primarily in New York. He graduated from Johns Hopkins University and received a master's degree from Wolfson College, Oxford, as a Rhodes Scholar. After several years in the U.S. Army and Army Reserve, he became an investment banker in New York. Between 2010 and 2015, Moore published five books, including a young-adult novel. He served as CEO of the Robin Hood Foundation from 2017 to 2021. Moore authored The Other Wes Moore and The Work. He also hosted Beyond Belief on the Oprah Winfrey Network (OWN), and was executive producer and a writer for Coming Back with Wes Moore on PBS.

Moore is a member of the Democratic Party. He won the 2022 Maryland gubernatorial election against Dan Cox, becoming Maryland's first black governor and the third black person elected governor of any U.S. state. (Note: Moore is the fifth black U.S. state governor, following P. B. S. Pinchback of Louisiana, Douglas Wilder of Virginia, Deval Patrick of Massachusetts and David Paterson of New York. Pinchback and Paterson were not elected, but succeeded from the lieutenant governorship.) He was re-elected to a second term in 2026, again defeating Cox in the general election.

== Early life and education ==
=== Early life ===
Moore was born on October 15, 1978, in Takoma Park, Maryland, a suburb of Washington D.C. His father, William Westley Moore Jr., was a broadcast news journalist, and his mother, Joy Thomas Moore, is a daughter of immigrants from Cuba and Jamaica, and a news media professional. His maternal grandfather, James Thomas, a Jamaican immigrant, was the first black minister in the history of the Dutch Reformed Church. His grandmother, Winell Thomas, a Cuban who moved to Jamaica before immigrating to the U.S., was a retired schoolteacher.

On April 15, 1982, when Moore was three years old, his father died of acute epiglottitis. In the summer of 1984, Moore's mother took him and his two sisters to live in the Bronx, New York, with her parents. His occasional babysitter was Kamala Harris's stepmother, Carol Kirlew. Moore attended Riverdale Country School. When his grades declined and he became involved in petty crime, his mother enrolled him in Valley Forge Military Academy and College. Moore's family moved back to Maryland after his mother's employer, the Annie E. Casey Foundation, relocated to Baltimore.

In 1998, Moore graduated Phi Theta Kappa from Valley Forge Military College with an associate degree. He then attended Johns Hopkins University, from which he graduated Phi Beta Kappa with a B.A. in international relations and economics in 2001. At Johns Hopkins, he also played wide receiver for the Johns Hopkins Blue Jays football team for two seasons, served as the chair of the university's Men of the NAACP branch, and was initiated into the Omicron Delta Kappa honor society, and Sigma Sigma chapter of Alpha Phi Alpha.

In 1998 and 1999, Moore interned for Baltimore Mayor Kurt Schmoke. He later became involved with the March of Dimes before serving in the Army. He also interned at the United States Department of Homeland Security under Secretary Tom Ridge.

After graduating, he attended Wolfson College, Oxford as a Rhodes Scholar, where he earned a master's degree in international relations in 2005 and submitted a thesis titled Rise and Ramifications of Radical Islam in the Western Hemisphere. While at Oxford, Moore shared a house with Luke Bronin.

=== Military service ===
After graduating from Valley Forge, Moore completed the requirements for the United States Army's early commissioning program, and was appointed a second lieutenant of Military Intelligence in the Army Reserve. In January 2003, the Army ordered Moore to report to Fort Benning to complete infantry-officer basic training required for deployment to Afghanistan, during which he aggravated a knee injury suffered in college and could not finish the training. He arrived at Fort Leonard Wood in February 2005 to complete his training.

Moore served in the 82nd Airborne Division and was deployed to Afghanistan from 2005 to March 2006, starting as an information operations officer and later attaining the rank of captain. During his service, he was awarded the Afghanistan Campaign Medal, Armed Forces Reserve Medal with "M" devices, Army Service Ribbon, Bronze Star Medal, Combat Action Badge, National Defense Service Medal, and the Parachutist Badge. Moore left the Army in 2014.

== Career ==
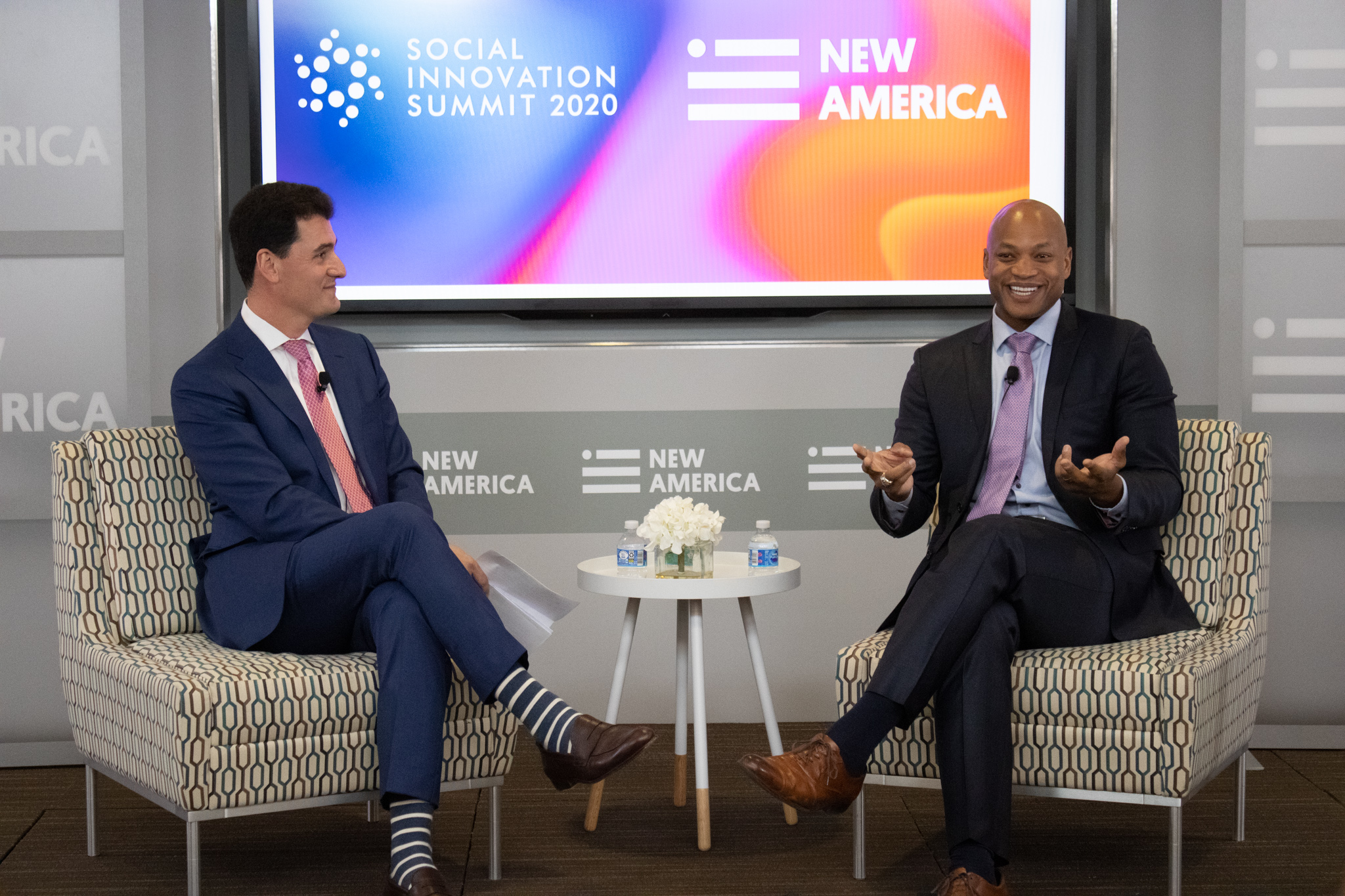
Moore at Social Innovation Summit by New America in January 2020

In February 2006, Moore was named a White House Fellow to Secretary of State Condoleezza Rice. He later worked as an investment banker at Deutsche Bank in Manhattan and at Citibank from 2007 to 2012 while living in Jersey City, New Jersey. In 2009, Moore was included on Crain’s New York Business's "40 Under 40" list.

In 2010, Moore founded a television production company, Omari Productions, to create content for networks such as the Oprah Winfrey Network, PBS, HBO, and NBC. In May 2014, he produced a three-part PBS series, Coming Back with Wes Moore, which followed the lives and experiences of returning veterans.

In 2014, Moore founded BridgeEdU, a company that provided services to support students in their transition to college. Students participating in BridgeEdU paid $500 into the program with varying fees. BridgeEdU was not able to achieve financial stability and was acquired by student financial services company Edquity in 2019, mostly for its database of clients. A Baltimore Banner interview with former BridgeEdU students found that the short-lived company had mixed results.

In September 2016, Moore produced All the Difference, a PBS documentary that followed the lives of two young African-American men from the South Side of Chicago from high school through college and beyond. Later that month, he launched Future City, an interview-based talk show with Baltimore's WYPR station.

From June 2017 until May 2021, Moore was CEO of the Robin Hood Foundation, a charitable organization that attempts to alleviate problems caused by poverty in New York City. It works mainly through funding schools, food pantries and shelters. It also administers a disaster relief fund. During his tenure as CEO, the organization also raised more than $650 million, including $230 million in 2020 to provide increased need for assistance during the COVID-19 pandemic. Moore also sought to expand his advocacy to include America's poor and transform the organization into a national force in the poverty fight.

Prior to his election as governor, Moore was a member of the boards of directors for Under Armour and Green Thumb Industries. In October 2022, Moore announced that he would use a blind trust to hold his assets and resign from every board position if elected governor. In May 2023, Moore finalized his trust, making him the first governor to have one since Bob Ehrlich. In May 2025, after similar conflict of interest concerns were raised about former governor Larry Hogan during his 2024 U.S. Senate campaign, Moore signed into law a bill requiring future governors to put their assets into a blind trust or sign an agreement not to participate in decisions affecting their businesses.

=== Books ===
On April 27, 2010, Spiegel & Grau published Moore's first book, The Other Wes Moore. The 200-page book explores the lives of two young Baltimore boys who shared the same name and race, but largely different familial histories that leads them both down very different paths. In December 2012, Moore announced that The Other Wes Moore would be developed into a feature film, with Oprah Winfrey attached as an executive producer.

In September 2013, Ember published his second book, Discovering Wes Moore. The book maintains the message and story set out in The Other Wes Moore, but is more accessible to young adults. In April 2021, Unanimous Media announced it would adapt The Other Wes Moore into a feature film. As of June 2022, a film has yet to be produced.

In January 2015, Moore wrote his third book, The Work. In November 2016, he wrote This Way Home, a young adult novel about Elijah, a high school basketball player, who emerges from a standoff with a local gang after they attempt to recruit him to their basketball team, and he refuses. In March 2020, Moore and former Baltimore Sun education reporter Erica L. Green wrote Five Days: The Fiery Reckoning of an American City, which explores the 2015 Baltimore protests from the perspectives of eight Baltimoreans who experienced it on the front lines.

In March 2027, Henry Holt and Company will publish Moore's sixth book, Repair: A Divided Nation, which provides an "honest assessment" of the country that offers a "path forward that leaves no one behind".

== Political career ==
=== Ideology ===
During an August 2006 interview with C-SPAN, Moore said he identified as a "registered Democrat" who is "social moderate and strong fiscal conservative". In September 2022, he reiterated his position on fiscal issues as being "fiscally responsible". During his gubernatorial campaign, he was described as center-left as well as progressive. He has been described as a moderate during his tenure as governor.

Moore has cited Jared Polis, Parris Glendening, and Roy Cooper as his political role models.

=== Early political involvement ===
Moore first expressed interest in politics in June 1996, telling a New York Times reporter that he planned to attend law school and enter politics after two years at Valley Forge. Moore first expressed interest in running for governor of Maryland during an interview with The Baltimore Sun in 2006, later telling The Baltimore Sun in October 2022 that he felt the idea of holding elected office only started to feel like a real possibility in 2020, when he was about to leave his job running Robin Hood.

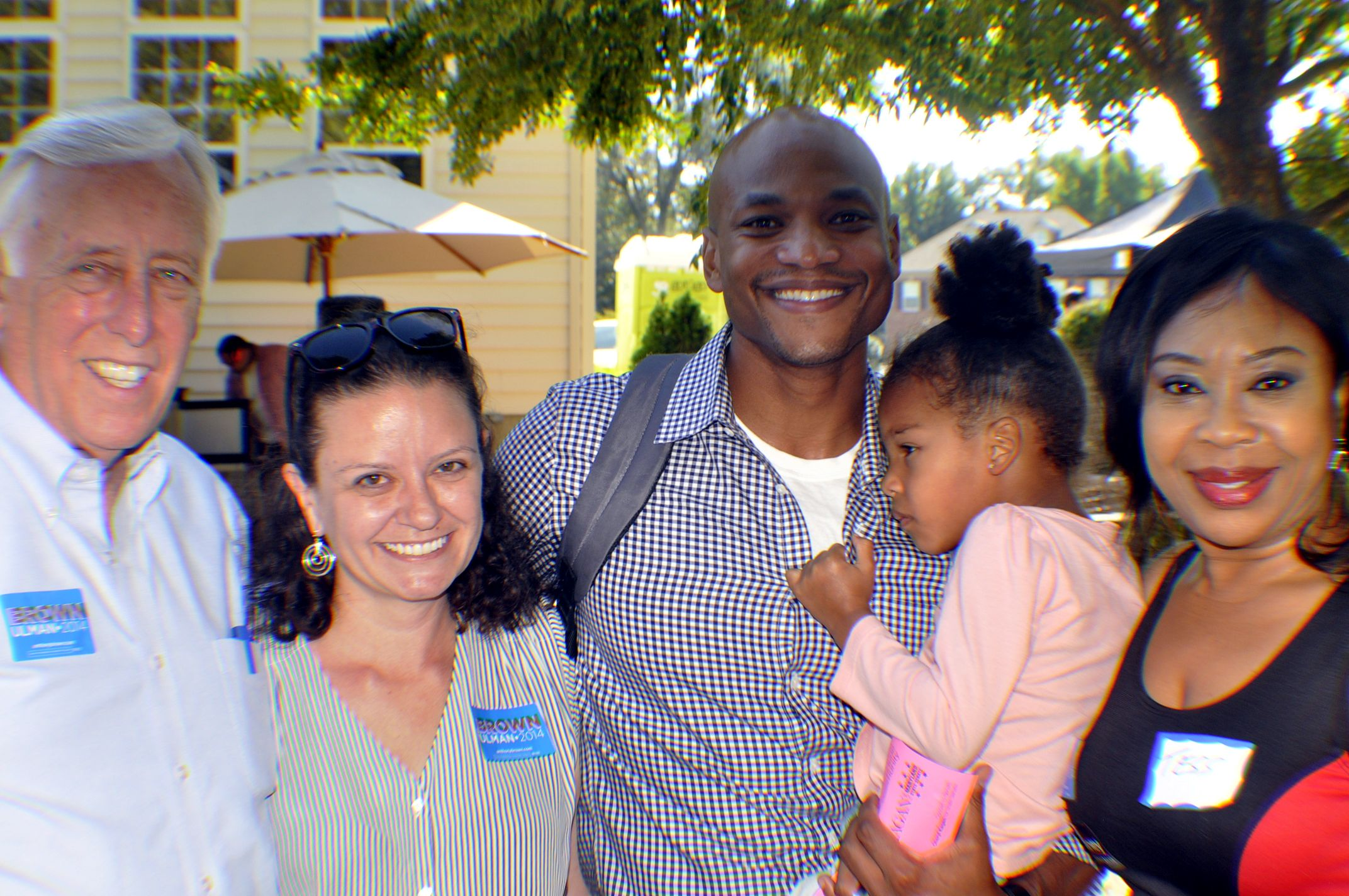
Moore (center) at a Maryland Democratic Party picnic, 2014

Moore gave a speech at the 2008 Democratic National Convention, supporting Barack Obama for president. In 2013, he said that he had "no interest" in running for public office, instead focusing on his business and volunteer work. Later that year, Attorney General Doug Gansler said that he considered choosing Moore as his running mate in the 2014 Maryland gubernatorial election, in which he ran with state delegate Jolene Ivey.

In April 2015, following the 2015 Baltimore protests, Moore said that the demonstrations in Baltimore were a "long time coming" and that Baltimore "must seize this moment to redress systemic problems and grow." Moore attended the funeral for Freddie Gray but left early to catch a plane to Boston for a speech he was giving on urban poverty. He later said he "felt guilty being away, but it wasn't just that. An audience in Boston would listen to me talk about poverty, but at a historic moment in my own city's history, I was MIA." On the eighth anniversary of Gray's death in April 2023, Moore made a tweet calling his death a turning point for not just those who knew Gray personally, but the entire city.

In February 2017, Governor Larry Hogan nominated Moore to serve on the University System of Maryland Board of Regents. In October 2020, Moore was named to serve on the transition team of Baltimore mayor-elect Brandon Scott. In January 2021, Speaker of the Maryland House of Delegates Adrienne A. Jones consulted with Moore to craft her "black agenda" to tackle racial inequalities in housing, health, banking, government, and private corporations.

=== Gubernatorial campaigns ===
==== 2022 ====
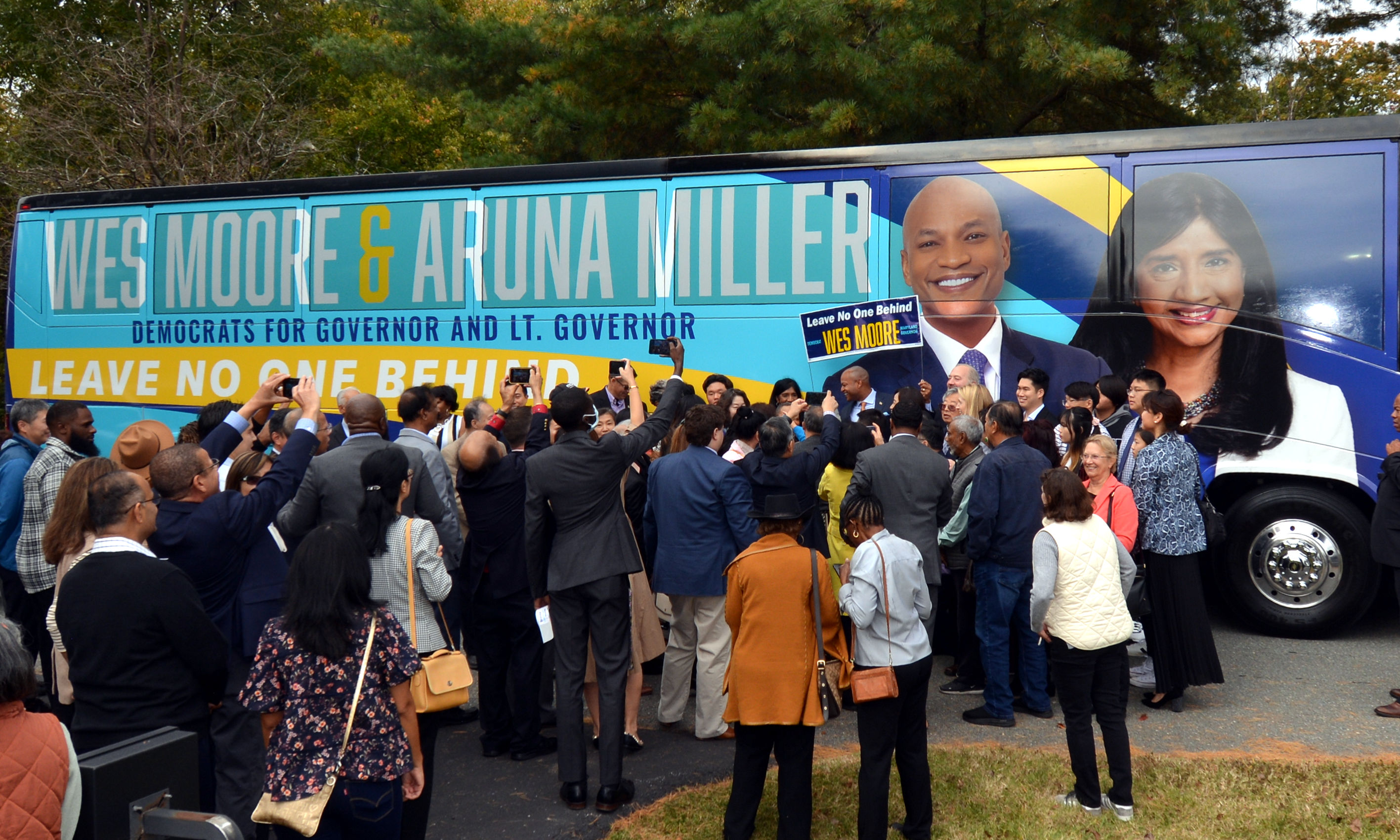
Moore campaigning in October 2022

In February 2021, Moore announced he was considering a run for governor of Maryland in the 2022 election. He launched his campaign on June 7, 2021, emphasizing "work, wages, and wealth" and running on the slogan "leave no one behind". His running mate was Aruna Miller, a former state delegate who represented Maryland's 15th district from 2010 to 2019.

During the primary, Moore was endorsed by House Majority Leader Steny Hoyer, Prince George's County executive Angela Alsobrooks, television host Oprah Winfrey, and former Governor Parris Glendening. He also received backing from the Maryland State Education Association and VoteVets.org.

On April 6, 2022, Moore filed a complaint with the Maryland State Board of Elections against the gubernatorial campaign of John King Jr., accusing "an unidentified party" of anonymously disseminating "false and disparaging information regarding Wes Moore via electronic mail and social media in an orchestrated attempt to disparage Mr. Moore and damage his candidacy." The complaint also suggested that King "may be responsible for this smear campaign", which the King campaign denied. In April 2024, King's campaign was fined $2,000 after prosecutors connected the email address to an IP address used by Joseph O'Hearn, King's campaign manager.

Moore won the Democratic primary on July 19, 2022, defeating former Democratic National Committee chairman Tom Perez and Comptroller Peter Franchot with 32.4% of the vote. During the general election, Moore twice campaigned with U.S. President Joe Biden. He also campaigned on reclaiming "patriotism" from Republicans, highlighting his service in the U.S. Army while also bringing attention to Republican nominee and state delegate Dan Cox's participation in the January 6 United States Capitol attack. Moore defeated Cox in the general election, and became Maryland's first black governor and the first veteran to be elected governor since William Donald Schaefer.

In December 2022, Moore was elected to serve as finance chair of the Democratic Governors Association.

==== 2026 ====
On September 9, 2025, Moore announced that he would run for re-election to a second term. Moore's campaign faced token opposition in the Democratic primary and remains well funded for the general election. In June 2026, ahead of the primary elections, Moore began paying for advertisements to promote former state delegate and 2022 gubernatorial nominee Dan Cox in the Republican primary.

Moore and Cox won their respective primaries on June 23, 2026. During the general election, Moore criticized Cox for supporting legislation during the 2020 legislative session to provide sales tax exemptions for data center equipment and sought to tie Cox to President Donald Trump, who endorsed Cox's gubernatorial campaign in 2022. Moore defeated Cox in the general election on November 3, 2026.

=== Governor of Maryland ===
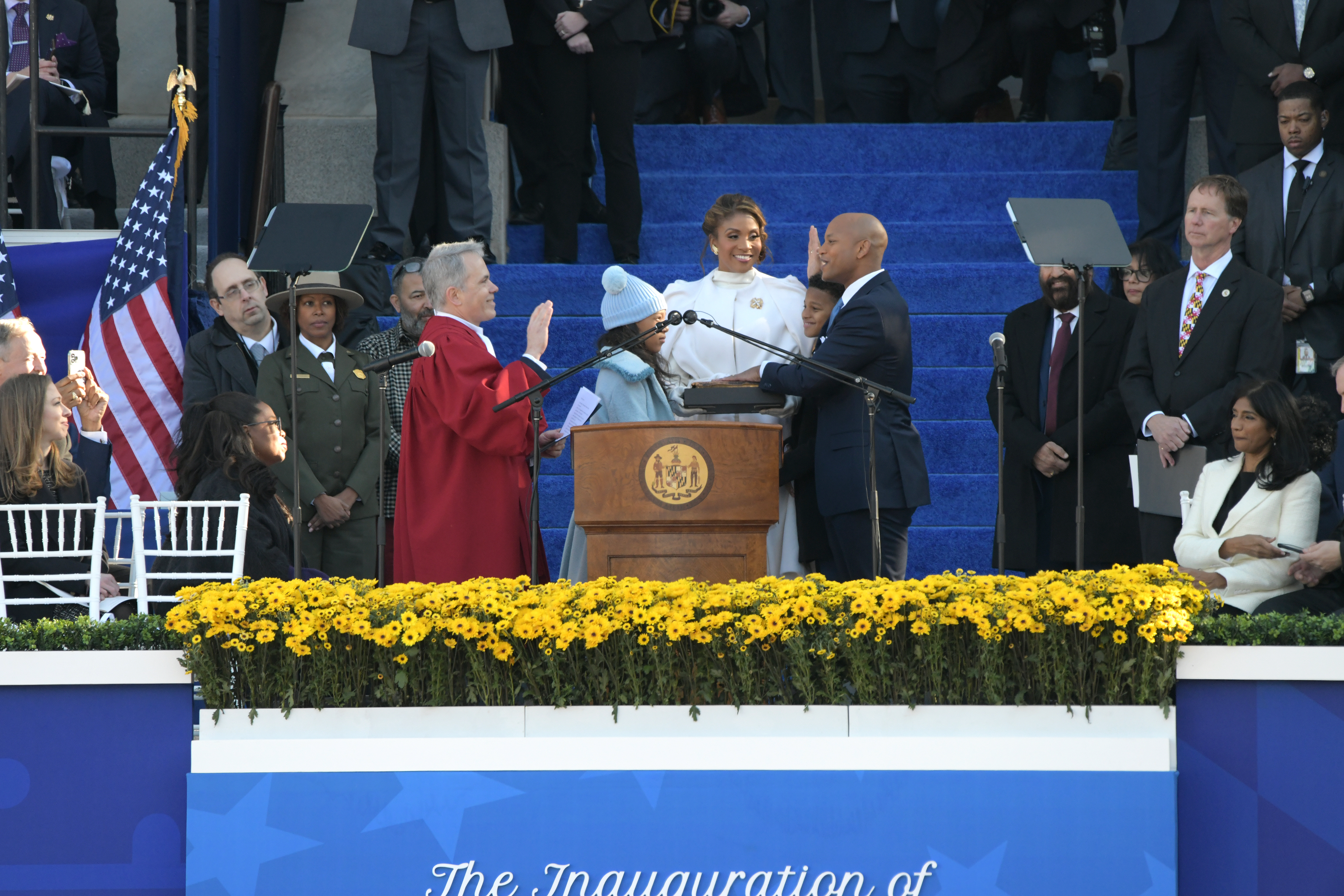
Moore being sworn in as governor, 2023

Moore was sworn in on January 18, 2023. He took the oath of office on a Bible owned by abolitionist Frederick Douglass, as well as his grandfather's Bible. The morning before his inauguration, Moore participated in a wreath-laying ceremony at the Kunta Kinte-Alex Haley Memorial at the Annapolis City Dock to "acknowledge the journey" that led to him becoming the third elected black governor in U.S. history. Later that night, he held a celebratory event at the Baltimore Convention Center.

As governor, Moore testified for several of his administration's bills, making him the first governor to do so since Martin O'Malley. During his first term, his legislative priorities included establishing a "service year option" for high school graduates, removing regulations around new housing development, and supporting military families through health care benefits, tax cuts, and employment opportunities.

He has sought to undo or revise many of his predecessor's decisions, including the cancellation of the Baltimore Red Line, the withholding of state funding for training abortion care providers, and plans to expand portions of the Capital Beltway and Interstate 270 using high-occupancy toll lanes. During the 2025 legislative session, Moore and leaders of the Maryland General Assembly negotiated and passed a spending plan that cut $2.5 billion in state spending and raised more than $1 billion in new taxes to close a $3.3 billion budget deficit.

The Francis Scott Key Bridge collapse occurred during Moore's tenure, after which he supported and signed into law legislation to provide financial assistance to workers and businesses affected by the subsequent closure of the Port of Baltimore. Following the disaster, Moore has urged Congress to pass legislation that would have the federal government cover the costs of rebuilding the bridge. In December 2024, President Joe Biden signed into law a continuing resolution bill that included a provision to fully fund the Francis Scott Key Bridge replacement.

Moore served as the vice chair of the National Governors Association (NGA) from 2025 to 2026, and as the association's chair since 2026. In February 2026, President Donald Trump excluded Moore and Colorado governor Jared Polis from a bipartisan dinner event for governors and their spouses, after which the NGA said they would no longer meet with Trump and multiple other Democratic governors said they would skip the event. In a post on Truth Social, Trump confirmed he did not invite Moore while also making multiple baseless accusations against him. Moore attended a NGA business meeting at the White House after the Trump administration reversed course and extended invites to Moore and Polis. During his tenure as chair of the NGA, Moore launched the "Service United" initiative to encourage governors to create and expand paid public service programs in their own states.

In December 2025, The Baltimore Banner reported that Moore and several members of his administration were, at times, communicating using the Google Chat platform with the "History is Off" function activated, which auto-deletes messages after 24 hours. State law requires that every unit of the state government to have policies defining which records need to be saved and which do not. In response to the Banner's findings, the Moore administration defended its use of self-deleting messages, saying that it was an "approved internal messaging feature" and "complies fully with all Maryland records laws and retention policies", but later said that the governor's office would work with the attorney general of Maryland to create a "uniform retention policy" across the executive branch.

In August 2026, The Baltimore Banner reported that Moore had spent a portion of one in every five days in other states since taking office in 2023. Moore's office objected to the inclusion of partial days in The Banner's analysis, saying it treated partial travel days as full days away and therefore resulted in a "sloppy and inaccurate" analysis.

== Disputed biographical claims ==
In April 2022, CNN accused Moore of embellishing his childhood and where he actually grew up. Shortly after the article was published, Moore created a website that attempted to rebut the allegations.

Moore has repeatedly claimed that his great-grandfather, a pastor from Charleston, South Carolina, had fled the Ku Klux Klan by moving to Jamaica in 1924. In February 2026, The Washington Free Beacon examined church records, which found that his grandfather was transferred to Jamaica to replace a pastor who had died. Moore rejected the Free Beacon's reporting as coming from a "right-wing blog" during a CBS News town hall later that month, suggesting that the website "should ask the Ku Klux Klan" if his family story was true.

=== Military ===
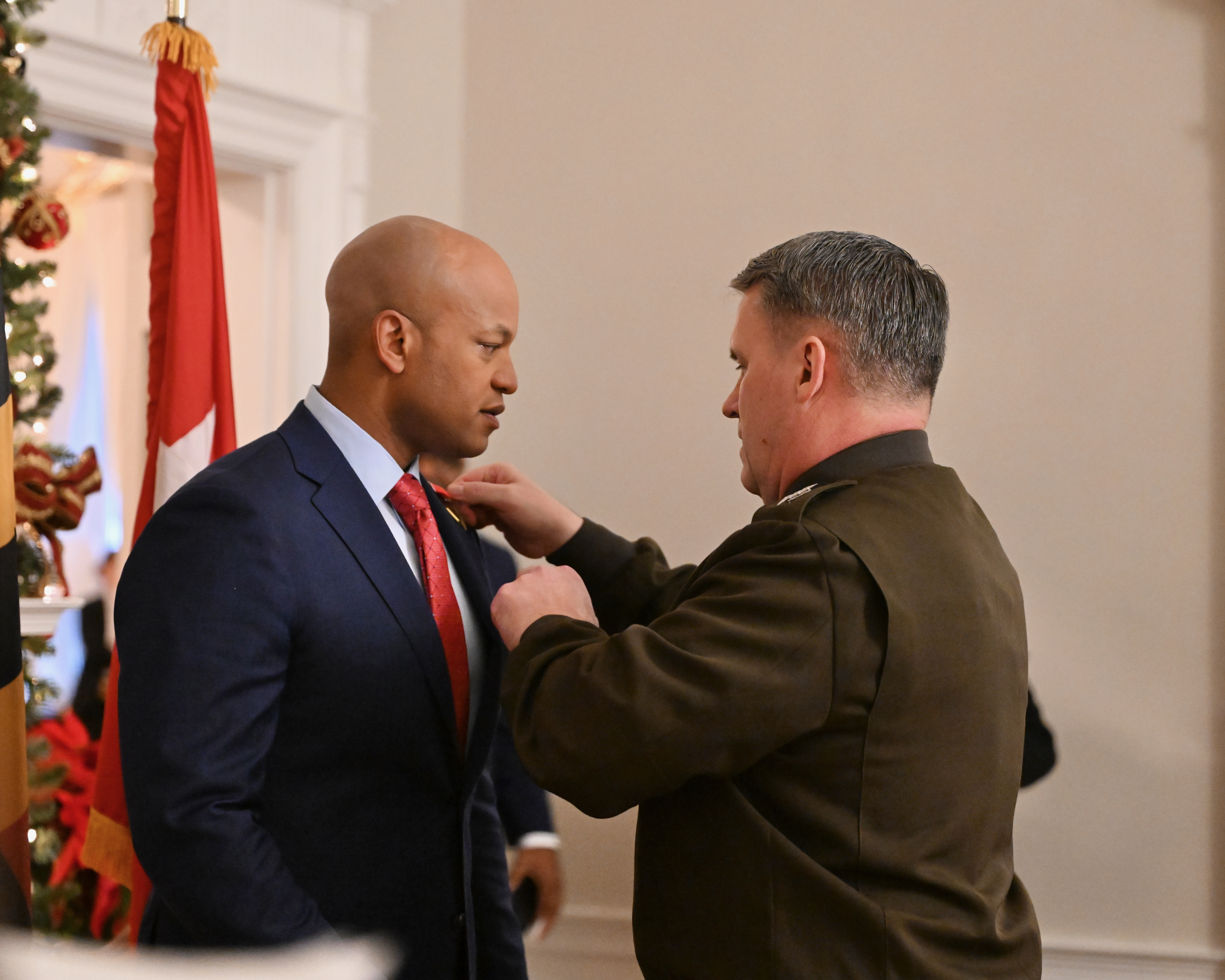
Lieutenant General Michael R. Fenzel presents Moore with a Bronze Star Medal, 2024

Lieutenant General Michael R. Fenzel recommended Moore for the Bronze Star Medal. Moore applied to a White House fellowship in 2006. According to Moore and Fenzel, Fenzel encouraged Moore to say he'd received the Bronze Star in his fellowship application even though it was not yet awarded. Fenzel claimed that he assumed the medal would have been awarded by the time the fellows were named. By 2024, the Bronze Star had still not been awarded, when Fenzel resubmitted the paperwork for Moore to receive the Bronze Star.

On November 19, 2024, Moore was finally cited with a Bronze Star Medal for meritorious service in Afghanistan. Lieutenant General Fenzel pinned the decoration on Moore on December 14. Fenzel stated that Moore's medal was awarded 20 years late. Moore failed to correct journalists who referred to him as a Bronze Star recipient, and he apologized for the mistake.

In April 2026, Semafor and Politico reported that David D. Smith, the executive chairman of Sinclair Broadcast Group and owner of The Baltimore Sun, was "deeply involved" with efforts to investigate Moore's military record, with The Sun having brought on a team of investigators from Fox 45 to comb through his military and collegiate athletic records. In the following months, The Baltimore Sun and Sinclair stations have published dozens of articles, analyses, and commentary pieces questioning Moore's claims about his service as an Army officer in Afghanistan, with many stories explicitly and repeatedly claiming that Moore lied about his military exploits.

In June 2026, Moore's staff provided The Baltimore Banner with access to his military records and helped coordinate interviews with people who served with Moore or knew details of his deployment. In their review, The Banner found that Moore was a competent, well-respected soldier, but mischaracterized or inaccurately recounted details about his military record in his public statements and writings about his tenure. Moore acknowledged these mischaracterizations, but added that his errors should not be construed in a way that would undermine his military service.

In November 2026, during an interview with Fox 45, Jamie Gottschling, Moore's former commanding officer, characterized Moore's descriptions of his service as an "embellishment" and said he would not have signed off awarding Moore a Bronze Star. Moore declined to comment on Gottschling's comments to Fox 45, but in an interview with Chuck Todd later that month, Moore suggested that Gottschling's comments may have been politically motivated and cited his officer evaluation report, in which Gottschling gave Moore top rankings. First lieutenant Anthony Del Signore, a U.S. Marine who served with Moore, disputed Gottschling's characterizations, telling WBAL-TV that he and Moore came under fire from a mountainside while traveling with a convoy around Afghanistan, and that Gottschling was "not in the chain of command that would have been reported to, and he wasn't in charge of the convoy".

=== Academic ===
In December 2025, The Washington Free Beacon accused Moore of exaggerating various details of his academic and military achievements on his 2006 White House fellowship application. He claimed to have graduated Oxford a year and a half earlier than he had, was a DPhil doctoral candidate at the University of Oxford, and was a "foremost expert" on Islamic extremism, who authored four articles and featured in two books on the threat of radical Islam in Latin America. A spokesperson for Moore disputed the claims made by the Free Beacon, saying that Moore had submitted his thesis and that the website would be spreading a conspiracy theory by suggesting otherwise. His office was unable to locate the four articles Moore claimed to have contributed to.

Julia Paolitto, the deputy head of university communications at Oxford University, clarified to WBFF that submitting a thesis to the Bodleian Library was not a requirement to complete the university's MLitt program, but it was a requirement to confer degrees at a ceremony, which Moore did not have. When asked about the Free Beacon report by Armstrong Williams of The Baltimore Sun, Moore described the story as a distraction, saying that he was "not going to spend a second of my time trying to dig up a paper that I wrote 20 some odd years ago because a right-wing blog post is asking me to."

== Personal life ==
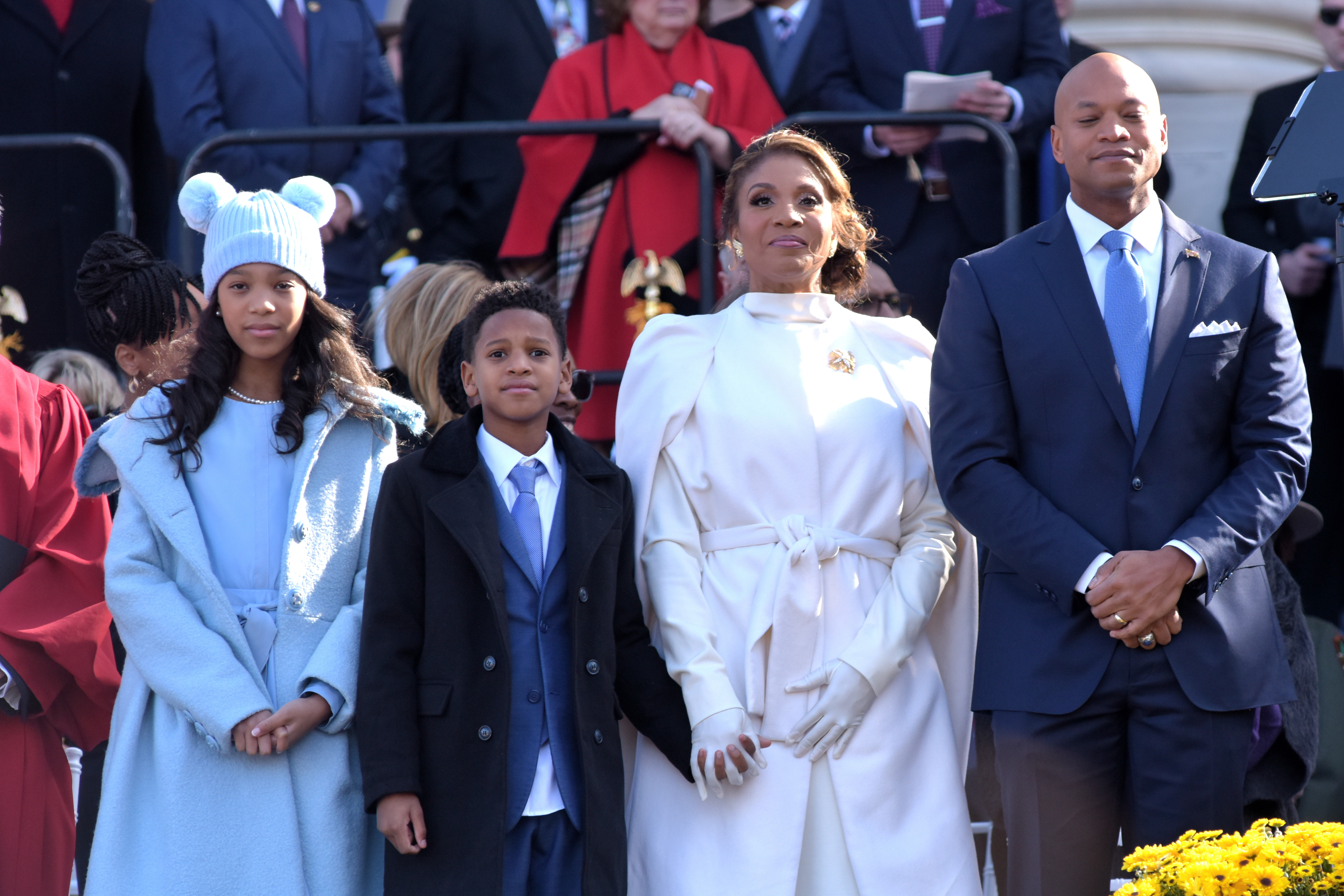
Moore and his family at his gubernatorial inauguration, 2023

Moore met Dawn Flythe in Washington, D.C. in 2002. They moved to the Riverside community in Baltimore in 2006. The couple eloped in Las Vegas while he was on a brief leave from Afghanistan and were married by an Elvis impersonator. Their official wedding ceremony was held on July 6, 2007. They have two children, born in 2011 and 2013.

In late 2008, the Moores moved from Riverside to Guilford, where they lived until Moore's election as governor in 2022. From 2015 to 2023, he attended services at the Southern Baptist Church in east Baltimore. They reside in Government House, the official residence of the Maryland governor and First Family in Annapolis, Maryland.

Moore holds honorary degrees from Loyola University Maryland, Lafayette College, Skidmore College, Lincoln University, and the University of the Commonwealth Caribbean. He is a member of the Sons of the American Revolution. His ancestor Prince Ames served in the Massachusetts Militia in the Revolutionary War.

Moore is a fan of the Baltimore Ravens, Baltimore Orioles, and New York Knicks.

In June 2013, an investigation by The Baltimore Sun alleged that Moore was improperly receiving homestead property tax credits and owed back taxes to the city of Baltimore. Moore told The Sun that he was unaware of any issues with the home's taxes and wanted to pay what he owed immediately. In October 2022, Baltimore Brew reported that Moore had not paid any water and sewage charges since March 2021, owing $21,200 to the city of Baltimore. Moore settled his outstanding bills shortly after the article was published.

== Electoral history ==
2022 Maryland gubernatorial election
Primary election
Party	Candidate	Votes	%
Democratic	Wes Moore; Aruna Miller	217,524	32.4
Democratic	Tom Perez; Shannon Sneed	202,175	30.1
Democratic	Peter Franchot; Monique Anderson-Walker	141,586	21.1
Democratic	Rushern Baker (withdrawn); Nancy Navarro (withdrawn)	26,594	4.0
Democratic	Doug Gansler; Candace Hollingsworth	25,481	3.8
Democratic	John King Jr.; Michelle Siri	24,882	3.7
Democratic	Ashwani Jain; LaTrece Hawkins Lytes	13,784	2.1
Democratic	Jon Baron; Natalie Williams	11,880	1.8
Democratic	Jerome Segal; Justinian M. Dispenza	4,276	0.6
Democratic	Ralph Jaffe; Mark Greben	2,978	0.4
Total votes		671,160	100.0
General election
Democratic	Wes Moore; Aruna Miller	1,293,944	64.53
Republican	Dan Cox; Gordana Schifanelli	644,000	32.12
Libertarian	David Lashar; Christiana Logansmith	30,101	1.50
Working Class	David Harding; Cathy White	17,154	0.86
Green	Nancy Wallace; Patrick Elder	14,580	0.73
Write-in		5,444	0.27%
Total votes		2,005,259	100.0
Democratic gain from Republican			

== Bibliography ==
- The other Wes Moore : one name, two fates, New York : Spiegel & Grau, 2010. ISBN 9780385528191
- Discovering Wes Moore : My Story, New York : Ember (Random House), 2013. ISBN 9780385741682, 9780385741675, 9780375986703
- The work : searching for a life that matters, New York : Spiegel & Grau, 2015. ISBN 9780812983845
- Wes Moore; Shawn Goodman, This way home, New York : Delacorte Press, 2015. ISBN 9780385741699
- Wes Moore; Erica L Green, Five days : the fiery reckoning of an American city, New York : One World, 2020. ISBN 9780525512363
- Repair : healing a divided nation, New York : Henry Holt & Company, 2027. ISBN 9781250481771

== See also ==
- List of minority governors and lieutenant governors in the United States

== Notes ==
Party political offices
Preceded by Ben Jealous	Democratic nominee for Governor of Maryland; 2022, 2026	Most recent
Political offices
Preceded by Larry Hogan	Governor of Maryland; 2023–present	Incumbent
Preceded by Kevin Stitt	Chair of the National Governors Association; 2026–present	Incumbent
U.S. order of precedence (ceremonial)
Preceded by JD Vance as Vice President	United States order of precedence Within Maryland	Succeeded by Mayor of city in which event is held
Preceded by JD Vance as Vice President	United States order of precedence Within Maryland	Succeeded by Otherwise Mike Johnson as Speaker of the House
Preceded by Maura Healey as Governor of Massachusetts	United States order of precedence Outside Maryland	Succeeded by Henry McMaster as Governor of South Carolina
