= The Other Wes Moore =

Non-fiction book by Wes Moore

The Other Wes Moore: One Name, Two Fates
- First edition
- Author: Wes Moore
- Language: English
- Publisher: Spiegel & Grau
- Publication date: 2010

The Other Wes Moore: One Name, Two Fates is a 2010 nonfiction book by Wes Moore, the current governor of Maryland. Published by Spiegel & Grau, it describes two men of the same name who had very different life histories. Tavis Smiley wrote the afterword.

The author states, "The other Wes Moore is a drug dealer, a robber, a murderer. I am a Rhodes scholar, a White House Fellow, a former Army officer. Yet our situations could easily have been reversed." Jen Steele of the Milwaukee Journal-Sentinel wrote that "Moore's message is that it takes a village – and a bit of luck – to successfully navigate the negative surroundings where so many urban youths grow up." Dave Rosenthal of The Baltimore Sun stated that the contrast of the Moores was similar to that of different sections of Baltimore, which have neighborhoods of varying levels of quality and safety.

In his interview, the author stated that his intended audience includes young people who are "going through transitions to adulthood" as well as their parents and guardians, other people who work with them, and people in organizations working with youth.

== Background ==
=== The lives of the two Wes Moores ===
The author served in the U.S. military, was an aide to Condoleezza Rice, and worked in investment banking. The author, whose father died after a medical misdiagnosis, stated that he was, as a pre-teen, failing classes and getting into legal trouble, but that his life changed after his mother sent him to Valley Forge Military Academy and College.

The book also documents Wesley John "Wes" Moore, born in 1975, who was also raised in Baltimore in the 1980s. This Moore, whose father abandoned him, sold illegal drugs. Wesley's mother Mary Moore, who had an associate's degree from the Community College of Baltimore, never attended Johns Hopkins University, even though she received admission, due to the cancellation of her Pell Grant. The other Wes Moore attempted to escape a life of crime, but he robbed a jewelry store on February 7, 2000, as part of a scheme with his brother, Richard Antonio "Tony" Moore, and two other men. Tony Moore shot and killed Sergeant Bruce A. Prothero during the getaway. All four were convicted of offenses related to the incident. Prothero was survived by his five children and wife.

Wesley Moore went to trial on first-degree murder, and was convicted. He was sentenced to life imprisonment without parole by a judge, with the sentence reported in the press on June 9, 2001. He was incarcerated, and as of 2011 still was, in the Jessup Correctional Institution in Jessup, Maryland. Of the four criminals, Wesley Moore was the last to receive his sentence. Tony Moore pleaded guilty so he could not be sentenced to death, and he also received life imprisonment without parole. Tony died in prison in 2008 from kidney failure.

=== Development of the book ===
The author first read about the other Wes circa 2000, in The Baltimore Sun. Both Wes Moores grew up in low-income environments and had encountered issues with illegal drugs and violence in their youths. The author mailed a letter to the prisoner, and one month later, to his surprise, got a response. The two began a mail correspondence and then the author visited the prisoner at Jessup. As part of the process, the author learned about the prisoner's history. He stated that he did not wish to judge the other and to be open in discussions so he could honestly explore the events. The author stated that he probably would not have written The Other Wes Moore if he had never gotten to know him as a person.

He also interviewed members of his own family, and of the other Wes's family. In regards to interviewing his own family, the author stated that he felt humiliated by some of the details and that there were facts he was unaware of until he did the interview. He added that he had difficulty getting information out of his family, and that "At first I was getting what they wanted me to hear. At times I felt like an eight-year-old asking questions from my mom or my uncle or my grandmother." He stated, "The interviews with my family were just as tough, just hearing some of the facts about your life and your family's lives."

The author initially considered using the title "Baltimore Sons".

== Contents ==
The book serves as both a biography of the other Wes Moore and an autobiography of the author. Sragow states, "The autobiographical parts ruthlessly analyze how the writer fell into bad behavior, then developed his brain and conscience" after intervention from loved ones. Sragow stated that the book, in regards to both the biography and autobiography, "refuses to whitewash anything".

The author examines why he found success in life and the other Wes Moore did not; the author said he had a support network and had role models that encouraged him to make positive decisions, and added that his education provided immense help to him. Frances Romero of Time stated that "In the case of the other Wes Moore, there appears to be no clear answer as to what went wrong." The website of Oprah Winfrey also stated that in regards to the other Wes, "Now, [the author] knows there's no simple answer." Thembe Sachikonye, who had a correspondence with the author, wrote in the Zimbabwean newspaper Newsday that "The juxtaposition between their lives, and the questions it raised about accountability, chance, fate, and family, had a profound impact on Wes."

The author stated that the other's mother losing her Pell Grants affected their future, and he argued that the man's future may have been different if his role models were stronger. Sragow stated that in that regard the author "acknowledges the unfairness of accident and history." However the author stated, in regards to the other Wes Moore's declaration that people will fail if people do not expect them to succeed, "I sympathized with him, but I recoiled from his ability to shed responsibility seamlessly and drape it at the feet of others." Steele stated, "But the book makes it clear that personal responsibility also is paramount."

The book includes a list of about 200 groups that provide services to underprivileged young people.

== Reception ==
Publishers Weekly starred the review and called the book "a moving exploration of roads not taken."

Kirkus Reviews called it "A testament to the importance of youth mentoring."

Rosenthal stated that "Moore's book could be another worthy example, and a potential pick for [2011's] One Maryland, One Book program."

In her review, Romero recommended skimming the book, the three possible ratings being reading, skimming or not reading the book at all.

The author said that he did not receive a significant amount of mail addressed to him with criticism of the book.

Prothero's family did not assist with the publication of the book, nor did they agree with it. The author said that he had no intentions of harming the Prothero family, nor did he intend to provide any excuses for the murder and robbery. The author said, "But I was very careful not to glorify Wes or excuse what happened in any way, and I think most people understand that." The author added that he received some letters showing concern for Prothero. In April 2022, Prothero's family accused the author of making contradictory statements about where the proceeds of the book went, saying that the family "directed no donations" to anywhere, including the nonprofits that the author named. The family also said that the author exaggerated his role in their son's life.

== Feature film adaptation ==
In April 2021, it was announced that a film adaptation of the book was in development from Unanimous Media, with Stephen Curry set to executive produce.
