= Allan Patterson Newman =

American serial killer and bank robber

- Born: February 22, 1951; Wheaton, Maryland, U.S.
- Died: October 7, 2000 (aged 49); Jessup Correctional Institution, Jessup, Maryland, U.S.
- Convictions: First degree murder (4 counts); Attempted murder Use of a handgun during a crime of violence (5 counts)
- Penalty: Life imprisonment without parole

Details
- Victims: 4
- Span of crimes: 1991–1992
- Country: United States
- State: Maryland
- Date apprehended: October 9, 1992

Allan Patterson Newman (February 22, 1951 – October 7, 2000) was an American criminal and serial killer. In a crime spree lasting nearly two years across three states, Newman committed four murders and a dozen bank robberies prior to his capture at Harpers Ferry, West Virginia. He was sentenced to life imprisonment for his crimes and imprisoned at Jessup Correctional Institution, where he was found dead in his cell in 2000.

== Early life ==
Little is known about Newman's early life and upbringing. A native of Wheaton, Maryland, he attended Virginia Tech in the 1970s and 1980s, but failed to earn a degree, earning money as a self-employed house painter. In 1978, after a girlfriend dumped him, he attempted suicide by shooting himself in the head and chest with .22 caliber handgun. While working as an insurance claim adjuster, he began a relationship with a woman from Rockville, but she too would dump him in early 1982.

After this, Allan began spying on her. On March 21, 1982, he stalked the woman and a man she was dating, using shortcuts to arrive at her house. He snuck in, and when he heard the couple arrive, grabbed two butcher knives and hid under the bed. The woman came into the room and found him, at which point Newman lunged at her and attempted to choke her. Her date then entered the room, and was immediately backstabbed twice. The two managed to temporarily hold off Newman and call the police, but the assailant fled through a bedroom window, cutting off the telephone cord with the knives and re-entering by smashing through the kitchen door. Again, the woman's date was stabbed in the face and chest, but miraculously survived the ordeal. Newman was later arrested and charged with 13 crimes, including attempted murder. He pleaded not guilty by reason of insanity, with his lawyer, Thomas Heeney, claiming that his client was suffering from delusions and paranoia. As part of a plea bargain, Allan pleaded guilty to two charges of battery and was given mandatory psychiatric counseling and five years probation, as well as a restraining order. He later wrote an apology letter to the woman, claiming that he was sorry and wanted to change for the better. In early 1985, he requested an early termination of his probation, which was denied. After living in Falls Church, Virginia for several years, Newman moved to an apartment building near the Wheaton Metro Station. He was described as a regular-looking and quiet tenant, but was often behind on rent.

== Crime spree ==
Newman's first recorded crime occurred on February 20, 1991, when he stole a 1987 Nissan Sentra in Rockville, shooting the owner in the arm. The following day, a bank in Fairfax, Virginia was robbed by a man using the same car. Months later, on November 13, he attempted to burgle an automobile dealership in Silver Spring, but was intercepted by two maintenance workers: 30-year-old José Escobar and 39-year-old Maura Portillo. In retaliation, Newman shot and killed both of them using his .357 Magnum, and fled the scene.

Twelve days later, Newman carjacked a red Toyota Supra in Rockville, which he used to rob a Signet Jewelers bank in Ellicott City the next day. On January 15, 1992, he shot and killed 31-year-old José Ramos during a robbery at a parking lot outside his Wheaton apartment. On February 24, while searching for another car, Newman came across 45-year-old Dr. Shahin Hashtroudi, an Iranian-born professor at the George Washington University, who was just leaving her Bethesda office. He shot her once in the head, leaving her to die from her injuries before stealing her white 1987 Toyota Camry. Hashtroudi's car was later used for robbing the Central Fidelity Bank in Chantilly, Virginia on March 5, with Newman ditching the vehicle five days later. (Note: Location reported as either Fairfax or Merrifield)

On April 9, Newman carjacked a man in Falls Church, and the day after, used it as an escape vehicle after robbing the Citizens Bank of Maryland in Bethesda. His last recorded crime occurred on October 9: donning either a ski mask or undergarments to cover his face, he threatened two teenage girls with a handgun in Woodlawn, telling them to hand over their car, a black 1983 Honda Civic belonging to one of the girls' mothers. At that moment, off-duty police officer Thomas J. Fenwick of the Baltimore Police Department encountered him, and the two men exchanged gunshots before Newman fled with the car.

== Capture, imprisonment and death ==
Following the carjacking, a police chase was initiated which spanned three states and ended in two shootouts between Newman and law enforcement. Eventually, he crashed the car into a curb in Harpers Ferry, West Virginia, resulting in another standoff. After 45 minutes, during which Newman expressed suicidal tendencies and threatened to shoot himself in the head, he was eventually persuaded to surrender by West Virginia State Police Corporal John Jeffries, Brunswick, Maryland police officer Gary W. Cline, Jefferson County Sheriff's Department Chief Deputy Sheriff James Jones, and Harpers Ferry police chief Charles Wyndham. Before surrendering, Newman had asked the officers to call his mother, thereby learning his name after she answered. He then asked them to ask her a question: what was his favorite cookie.

Following his arrest, police departments from Maryland and Virginia, as well as the FBI, began investigating Newman's activities, aiming to connect him to recent bank robberies and carjackings in the region. His apartment in Wheaton was searched, with police seizing his 1980s blue Chevy Chevette, stacks of newspapers dating back to 1989, clothing, shopping bags, painting equipment and other items.

In the meantime, the ATF tested shell casings from the Magnum that Newman was carrying, revealing that it was the same weapon used in the Hashtroudi killing. Two days after this revelation, Newman was also connected to the Escobar–Portillo and Ramos killings. He was also suspected in the murders of 34-year-old businessman J. Schuyler Alland in Baltimore and 29-year-old Reynaldo Patdu, who was shot dead in the same apartment complex where Newman lived. It was later determined that the cases were unrelated, with Alland's actual murderers being captured a year later.

When confronted with the evidence, Allan Newman cut a deal with prosecutors to plead guilty and accept multiple life sentences in exchange for withdrawing the death penalty. Newman was convicted of the four murders and several weapons offences, receiving five terms of life imprisonment, plus 100 years in prison for five counts of using a handgun in the commission of a violent crime. He was sent to serve his sentence at the Jessup Correctional Institution, where several years later he would be found unconscious in his shared cell. Medical personnel were unable to resuscitate him, and Newman was declared deceased. His death was investigated and his cellmate questioned, but no conclusive cause of death could be determined.
