= General Schwartz =

General Schwartz may refer to:

- Mark C. Schwartz (fl. 1980s–2020s), U.S. Army lieutenant general
- Norton A. Schwartz (born 1951), U.S. Air Force four-star general
- Thomas A. Schwartz (born 1945), U.S. Army four-star general
