= United States security assistance to the Palestinian National Authority =

Aid sometimes given to the PNA's security forces

The United States began providing security assistance to the Palestinian Authority (PA) in the mid-1990s, and actively did so through the 2000s. After the Oslo Accords formed the PA, the U.S. gave aid on an ad hoc basis, often covertly at the outset. Since 2005, however, the U.S. State Department has provided direct financial and personnel assistance to Palestinian security organizations when it established the office of the United States Security Coordinator (USSC) for Israel and the Palestinian territories through the Bureau for International Narcotics and Law Enforcement Affairs (INL). In 2007 the USSC team began training certain Palestinian Authority Security Forces (PASF) including the Palestinian National Security Forces (NSF) and the Presidential Guard with the intent to train, equip, and garrison 10 NSF battalions by the end of 2010. Over the years, U.S. security assistance to the Palestinian Authority has expanded and received praise as well as criticism from American, Palestinian, and Israeli groups.

== Overview ==
=== Arafat era (1993–2000) ===
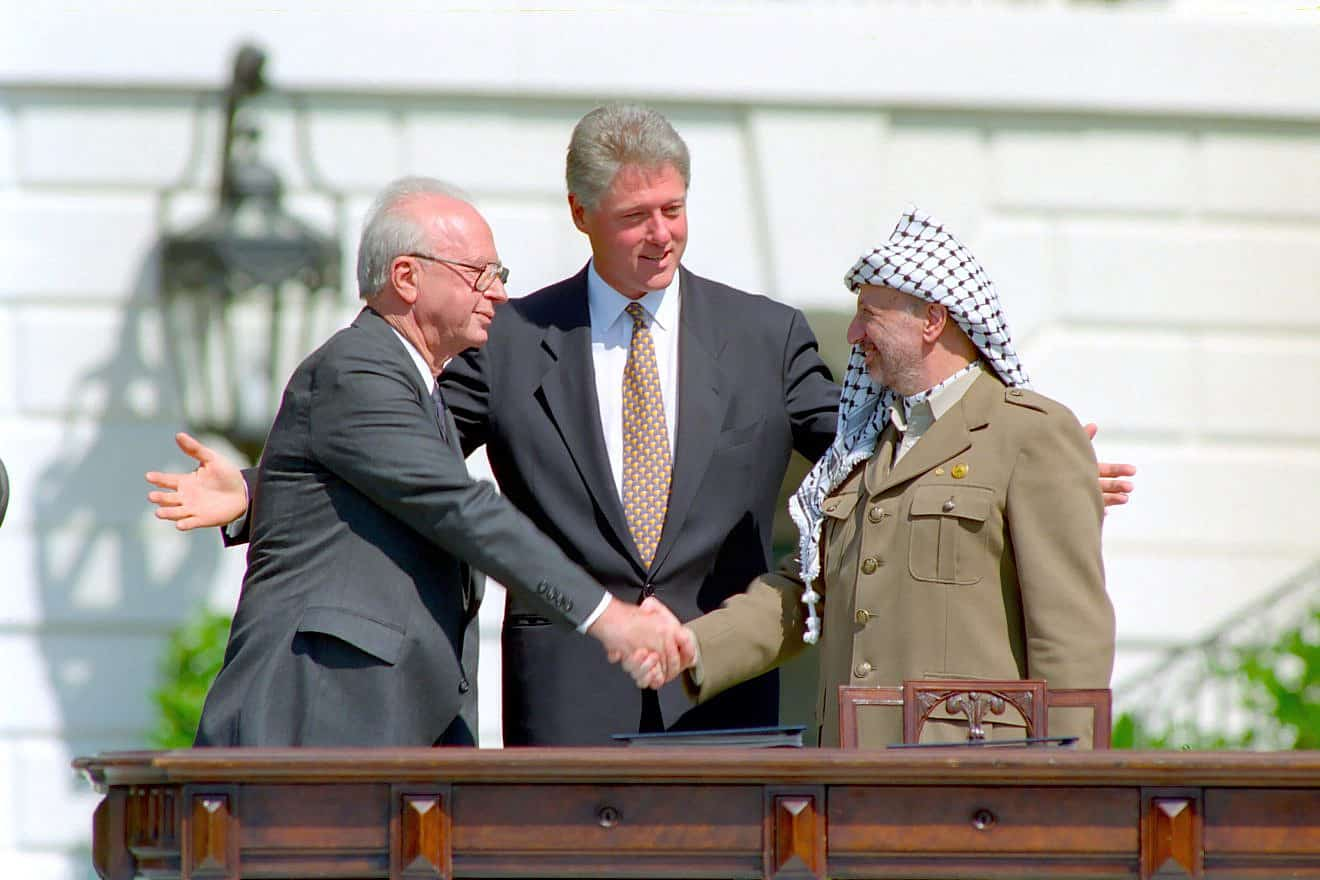
Yitzhak Rabin, Bill Clinton, and Yasser Arafat at the Oslo Accords signing ceremony on September 13, 1993

U.S. security sector assistance began publicly at the conclusion of the Oslo Accords, through aid to the Palestine Liberation Organization (PLO) for the Palestinian Police under the authority of PLO chairman Yasser Arafat. While Arafat requested international donor assistance for his police force in early 1993, substantial coordination did not occur before the deployment of the Palestinian Police to Gaza and Jericho in 1994. According to Norwegian scholar Brynjar Lia, in his book Building Arafat's Police: The Politics of International Police Assistance in the Palestinian Territories after the Oslo Agreement, the international community, especially the European Union (EU) and the United States, was at odds regarding the appropriate means by which to facilitate donor aid to the newly established Palestinian Authority. Additionally, though concerns about inadequate police equipment, training, and resources were paramount to the PLO and Arafat, international actors did not emphasize this component of their overall efforts to support the Oslo agreements. Lia argues that this was predominantly because many donor countries already had covert bilateral security sector assistance programs unrelated to the new international donation structures, and also because the PLO did not successfully convey their requests to Western donors who lacked confidence that the PLO would coordinate security aid to donor satisfaction.

In December 1993 the first police donor conference was held in Oslo, Norway, with 14 donor countries plus the EU, U.S., World Bank, PLO, and Israel invited. Egypt and Jordan were the only Arab countries in attendance and they were already independently supporting the training of a few thousand Palestinian policemen on their soil. This conference did not produce significant security sector aid offers. An emergency meeting of donors to the Palestinian police on March 24, 2004, was called by Norway with only two days' notice to discuss the impending deployment of Palestinian police to Hebron, Gaza and Jericho in conjunction with a new compromise reached by the PLO and Israel. Lia posits that "the underlying cause was most probably the U.S. policy of tailoring international aid in support of the political negotiating process...." The conference included 73 official participants from 21 countries plus the UN, EU, World Bank, PLO, and Israel with a high-profile American presence including Special Envoy Dennis Ross and other top U.S. officials. Again, pledges of support were not specific.

Aside from the official police and security sector discussions, the U.S. was undertaking some independent training and equipment donations, though the programs—mainly organized by the Central Intelligence Agency (CIA)—were not explicitly detailed to the international community. Lia writes that covert contacts and counter-terrorism collaboration between the PLO and the CIA had been ongoing in the 1970s and throughout the Lebanese Civil War in the 1980s but were not favored in the Reagan and Bush administrations. After the Oslo accords, the Clinton Administration revived covert ties and intelligence training. In January 1994 media sources reported that PLO officials and bodyguards were traveling to the U.S. to receive training as a result of an agreement between Arafat and U.S. Secretary of State Warren Christopher. Publicly, the U.S. was ambivalent regarding support for police and security sector activities. The Gaza–Jericho Agreement between the PLO and Israel signed on May 4, 1994, increased U.S. interest in coordinating public international efforts to fund the PLO police who were to deploy into Gaza and Jericho. The day after the treaty was signed, the U.S. announced a $5 million grant for the PLO police and they worked to encourage other nations to donate flexible funds for the same purpose.

Early U.S. concerns about the use of PA security sector funds stemming from what they perceived to be the forces' military orientation rather than civilian police and from their wariness of troop loyalty—the forces mostly consisted of Arafat's personal security detail and members of the Palestinian Liberation Army)—influenced the U.S. policy decision to mitigate early international efforts to finance PA police. Yet, a rise in violence in 1996 is believed to have precipitated the Clinton Administration's enhanced covert security funding and assistance to Arafat for combating groups such as Hamas. In her November 13, 2000, piece in The New York Times, Elaine Sciolino outlined four years of covert programming undertaken by the CIA from 1996 to 2000 with involvement at the most senior levels, including work by Director George Tenet. She wrote:

The CIA first appeared center stage in peace efforts early in 1996, after a wave of bombings in Israel by Hamas. Mr. Tenet, then deputy director of central intelligence, met with his Israeli and Palestinian counterparts for the first time, say current and former American officials.

Soon afterward, Mr. Clinton signed a presidential order creating a covert program to provide tens of millions of dollars to increase the professionalism of the Palestinian security services and help combat terrorism, the officials said.

The CIA sent operatives to train the Palestinians in interrogation techniques and to organize their files. The Palestinians were showered with advanced radio communications and X-ray equipment, bomb detection scanners, computers, vehicles and other equipment.

Also according to Sciolino, the CIA's involvement in the peace process increased under the October 23, 1998 Wye River Memorandum only to be sidelined by the beginning of the Second Intifada in 2000. She mentions in the same article that Tenet was asked to make a direct plea to Arafat to encourage the PA president to accept the terms of the July 2000 Camp David Summit but he was unsuccessful.

=== Second Intifada (2000–2004) ===
In September 2000 the Second Intifada broke out after the Camp David Summit peace talks failed. A sharp rise in violence involving PA security forces and Israeli soldiers and civilians during this time, whether considered acts of resistance or of militancy, contributed to a cessation of security cooperation between Israel and Palestine though the U.S. attempted to restore ties. Israeli troops reoccupied areas formerly under PA rule and added hundreds of roadblocks and checkpoints throughout the territories and began the construction of a controversial barrier along the entire length of the West Bank, which was justified by Israel as a necessary security measure but described by Palestinians as an effort to take away their land. Additionally during the course of the Intifada, Israel destroyed most of the PA security infrastructure including ministry buildings, barracks, and other facilities. U.S. covert assistance to Palestinian intelligence agencies for counter-terrorism work is reported to have continued throughout the Intifada, even though all public international security assistance was withheld from the PA during the course of the fighting.

=== Roadmap agreement (2004–2006) ===
Following the Roadmap for Peace Agreement (Roadmap) arranged by President George W. Bush's administration, U.S. Secretary of State Condoleezza Rice oversaw the creation of the United States Security Coordinator (USSC) team with the intent to assist the new PA President Mahmoud Abbas in reforming the Palestinian security sector. In March 2005, the Ward Mission was dispatched, headed by Lieutenant General (Lt. Gen.) Kip Ward, to Tel Aviv. This new agency was tasked with supervising and advising the Palestinian security sector and the USSC stated that the U.S. would regard the USSC as the only channel for international security assistance to the PA. The USSC chose to conduct a needs assessment with the help of a third party American NGO, known as the Strategic Assessments Initiative. The Initiative then created the International Transition Assistance Group (ITAG) to oversee the assessment. ITAG was run by Jarat Chopra and had several international consultants with significant experience with the Palestinian government and the PLO. A Palestinian–International Transitional Security Planning Team (TSPT) was formed in April 2005 as a joint effort between the PA Minister of the Interior General Nasser Youssef, and Lt. Gen. Kip Ward. The Palestinian side was led by Major General Jamal Abu Zayed who was at the time the Assistant Minister of the Interior. Most of the international experts were also part of the ITAG. The primary purpose of the TSPT was to concentrate on the Israeli unilateral disengagement plan from Gaza, working to assess the ability of PA forces to take over security tasks in Gaza and to coordinate security issues with Israel. There were ten meetings held in mid-2005, however there was a major rift in July 2005 after the Security Assessment Initiative's report on the findings of the ISAG assessment was leaked and then formally published. This report: "Planning Considerations for International Involvement in the Palestinian Security Sector" was embarrassing to Palestinian representatives of the TSPT because of its criticism of General Youssef and its emphasis on the corruption and lack of reform in the Palestinian security sector. Ultimately, Lt. Gen. Ward ended ties with the Strategic Assessments Initiative and the ITAG after Israel's disengagement.

=== Fatah–Hamas conflict (2006–2007) ===
Not long after the U.S. re-established public security assistance to the PA, Lt. Gen. Keith Dayton was appointed to take over the USSC mission, and in January 2006, PA parliamentary elections gave Hamas a majority of seats in the Palestinian Legislative Council (PLC), which had previously been dominated by the Fatah party. Because Hamas is considered by the U.S. government to be a Foreign Terrorist Organization, it is illegal for U.S. funds to be used to support them even as part of a broader organization like the PA. Though the elections were originally supported by the U.S. government, the U.S. encouraged President Abbas to retain control over the government by consolidating his power. The U.S. contributed to this by transferring money for security assistance directly to Abbas and Fatah rather than through the PA. The Presidential Guard, the security forces for protecting President Abbas, were the primary recipients of the U.S. support.

The move to support one faction in the Palestinian Authority was controversial. A news article from The Christian Science Monitor in May 2007 described the tension like this:

That policy puts the U.S. and Israel on a highly unusual course in the history of the Palestinian–Israeli conflict: Four-square support for Fatah to contain, if not defeat, the growing power of Hamas, which won the Palestinian Authority's (PA) last election.

But whether the effort will succeed is far from certain, and some analysts say there are risks to that course, chief among them the possibility of further fueling the internal Palestinian conflict, leading to deeper despair in the occupied territories and a PA less able to make the compromises on peace with Israel than it is today.

According to Lt. Gen. Dayton, after the election, the USSC focused on coordinating international actors to boost the Gazan economy by training PA's Presidential Guard troops to oversee border crossings. In Dayton's words: "because the Presidential Guard reported directly to President Abbas and was not influenced by Hamas, they were considered to be in the game." Dayton went on in his speech to indicate that "all other security forces suffered greatly from Hamas neglect, nonpayment of wages, and persecution, while Hamas went on to create its own security forces with lavish support from Iran and from Syria." After Abbas banned the Hamas force, and there were a number of violent incidents between Fatah and Hamas and many assassinations on both sides for month. To avoid civil war, the parties agreed, in what became known as the Mecca agreement, to form a unity government, but this unity government was not approved by the international community, which continued to support Fatah and Abbas' troops exclusively. The Peruvian diplomat Alvaro de Soto, who served as UN envoy to the Quartet, remarked in 2007 when he resigned from his post, that the U.S. actively opposed reconciliation and "'pushed for a confrontation between Fatah and Hamas.'" This assertion was also made in an article in Vanity Fair in April 2008 entitled "Gaza Bombshell", which describes support of the U.S. for Muhammad Dahlan, a Fatah fighter who had been established as Fatah's head of security in Gaza, with arms and assistance in attempting to overthrow Hamas in Gaza.

Regardless of U.S. intention, in June 2007, Hamas gained control of the entire Gaza Strip by force, and subsequently PA President Abbas declared a state of emergency and formed a new cabinet without Hamas members. This cabinet included the appointed Prime Minister Salam Fayyad. The division led the U.S. and Israel to release funds to the PA and Israel increased coordination with PA forces again. Raids to hunt down Hamas members and fighters in the West Bank occurred with the approval of the U.S. and Israel. These circumstances led to the creation of the PASF training program, which became the predominant aspect of U.S. security assistance to the Palestinian Authority.

=== PASF training program (2007–2010) ===
The PASF training program was developed under the leadership of Lt. Gen. Keith Dayton. It is the dominant means by which the U.S. supports the 2008–2010 Palestinian Reform and Development Plan, which is a plan that the PA made to address Roadmap obligations. It is described in further detail below.

=== Security Sector Reform (2007–2018) ===
The USSC, along with its international partners, has endeavored to support the additional "softer" facets of Palestinian security sector reform, termed "advise and assist." This consists, namely, of human resources; chain-of-command and logistical reform emanating from the Interior Ministry; rule-of-law initiatives emanating from the judiciary; and overall strategic planning. As Dayton put it, these steps are intended "to enforce the rule of law, and make [the PASF] accountable to the leadership of the Palestinian people whom they serve." So far, however, progress on this front has been less even than the train-and-equip component and faced political pushback. Nevertheless, USSC support is expected to focus on this facet of its operations in the years ahead.

==== Civilian Oversight Agenda ====
A number of initiatives led by the U.S. Security Coordinator were introduced to fortify the Interior Ministry, including the creation of a Strategic Planning Department intended to "provide long-term, central planning to develop human and other resources for the security sector as a whole." While technically sound, this and similar initiatives failed to truly empower the Interior Ministry, as security chiefs maintained their direct relationships with the prime minister and president, bypassing the ministry.

== United States Security Coordinator ==
=== Establishment ===
The USSC began on the ground in Jerusalem in March 2005, as a small team headed by Lt. Gen. Kip Ward, and it has increased in prominence under Lt. Gen. Keith Dayton from December 2005 – October 2010. Since that time the organization has expanded to include various members of the international community.

The former deputy national security adviser to President George W. Bush, Elliott Abrams, characterized the impetus for founding the USSC as based on three factors: George W. Bush's re-election to a second term and his commitment to the Roadmap for Peace, the death of Yasser Arafat on November 11, 2004, and the election of Mahmoud Abbas to the PA presidency in January 2005. Arafat was perceived as resistant to reform of the Palestinian security sector but Abbas was regarded as a moderate who could be worked with.

==== Mission ====
According to Lt. Gen. Dayton in his seminal speech on the subject to the Washington Institute for Near East Policy in May 2009 the mission of the USSC is:

to coordinate various international donors under one plan of action that would eliminate duplication of effort. It was to mobilize additional resources and to allay Israeli fears about the nature and capabilities of the Palestinian Security forces. The USSC was to help the Palestinian Authority to right-size its force and advise them on the restructuring and training necessary to improve their ability, to enforce the rule of law, and make them accountable to the leadership of the Palestinian people whom they serve.

In the speech, Dayton laid out four major investments and accomplishments of the USSC under his tenure:

1. Train and Equip—"we have focused on transforming the Palestinian national security forces into a Palestinian gendarme—an organized police force or police units."
2. Capacity Building in the Ministry of Interior—"we have invested considerable funds and personnel into making the ministry a leading arm of the Palestinian government with a capacity to budget, to think strategically, and to plan operationally."
3. Infrastructure—"we have worked with Palestinian contractors to build a state-of-the-art training college for the Presidential Guard in Jericho as well as a brand new operational base that will house...one thousand of the returning NSF gendarmes...."
4. Senior Leadership Training—"we get thirty-six men from all the security services together and they learn how to think about current-day problems and how to operate jointly and with respect for international standards."

==== Location ====
The USSC Headquarters is a building at the U.S. Consulate General, Jerusalem. U.S. staff have significant travel restrictions in the region due to State Department rules, but foreign workers and U.S. contractors do not face the same rules, and some of those staff are based in Ramallah in the West Bank.

==== Personnel ====
The staff of the USSC numbers about 75 persons, including American, Canadian, British, Turkish, Dutch, Polish, and Bulgarian military officers and U.S. civilians. Up to 16 people in the Jerusalem office are U.S. military staff while around 20 Canadian military personnel and approximately 15 British military staff work in Ramallah. USSC has staff at the U.S. Embassy in Tel Aviv as well. And prior to 2018, DynCorp International, a U.S. private contractor, provided 28 civilian employees. There are additional staff from the U.S. foreign service serving in the INL office in Jerusalem who oversaw the use of program funds (ceased in 2018) for the USSC and they were also responsible for the contractors. INL staff and contractors managed the warehouses of equipment and also manage the West Bank infrastructure construction projects.

DynCorp contractors staff "Mobile Training Teams" (MTT), which trained the NSF battalions in Jordan to staff the Strategic Planning Directorate (SPD). The office opened in 2007 to assist strategic capacity building of the Ministry of the Interior in its attempt to exert civilian control over the PA Security Forces. This training ceased in 2018 with he announcement that U.S. funding to the PA had been suspended.

The USSC staff report to the Secretary of State through their Near East and Asia Bureau and to the Chairman of the Joint Chiefs of Staff.

==== Funds allocated ====
The USSC team had no project funding until 2007, when it received its first Congressional appropriation in Fiscal Year 2007. All of the funding has been allocated through appropriations to the Bureau for International Narcotics Control and Law Enforcement (INL) at the State Department.

- FY 2007—$86.4 Million
- FY 2008—$25 Million
- FY 2008 Supplemental—$50 Million
- FY 2009—$25 Million
- FY 2009 Supplemental—$106 Million
- FY 2010—$100 Million

State Department appropriations to the USSC under Lt. Gen. Dayton totaled $392 million from 2007 to 2010 with a request of $150 million for fiscal year 2011 still outstanding.

Over $160 million of the total has been allocated for the PASF training program. Equipment provision to the PA NSF and Presidential Guard has totaled around $89 million and $99 million has been invested in construction of infrastructure. Capacity building programs for the Palestinian Ministry of the Interior have been funded at $22 million to date.

For FY 2011, $150 million has been requested for training ($56 million), equipment ($33 million), infrastructure ($53 million) and capacity building projects ($3 million).

=== Potential downgrade ===
In June 2022, it was reported by Axios that the Defense Department was considering downgrading the role of Security Coordinator from the rank of lieutenant general to colonel, in compliance with general and flag officer reductions mandated by the National Defense Authorization Act of 2017. This move faced pushback from several House representatives, including Grace Meng and Mike Waltz.

=== Leadership ===
==== Lt. Gen. Kip Ward ====
General Kip Ward was the first U.S. Security Coordinator for Israel and the Palestinian Authority. Ward was a lieutenant general when he served in this capacity, from March through December 2005. His original mandate to oversee PA security reform was shifted to a focus on preparing for Israel's unilateral disengagement plan from Gaza and certain West Bank settlements in August 2005.

==== Lt. Gen. Keith Dayton ====
Lt. Gen. Keith Dayton of the United States Army served for five years as the U.S. Security Coordinator for Israel and the Palestinian Authority, from 2005 to 2010. Dayton replaced Lt. Gen. William "Kip" Ward in December 2005 just a month before Hamas won a majority of seats in the January 2006 Palestinian parliamentary elections. Nathan Thrall reports that "overnight, Dayton's task changed from reforming the security forces to preventing a Hamas-led government from controlling them." Dayton retired from the U.S. Army following his departure from the USSC assignment in October 2010 and is now the director of the George C. Marshall European Center for Security Studies in Garmisch-Partenkirchen, Germany.

==== Lt. Gen. Michael R. Moeller ====
Lieutenant General Michael R. Moeller of the United States Air Force served for two years as the U.S. Security Coordinator from October 2010 to October 2012. According to his official military biography, immediately prior to this appointment, Moeller served as Director for Strategy, Plans and Policy for Headquarters U.S. Central Command (CENTCOM). General Moeller has served as a pilot in operations Desert Storm, Enduring Freedom, and Iraqi Freedom. Since this was designated a "position of importance and responsibility" under United States law (10 USC 601), the incumbent holds the rank of lieutenant general. Moeller's appointment by the Obama Administration is reported to be an effort to increase coordination between CENTCOM and the USSC program. Additionally, since taking over for Dayton, Lt. Gen. Moeller has kept a low profile, which has been attributed to his desire to smooth relations with the PA, who were quite displeased with his predecessor. On May 15, 2012, Moeller was nominated by the President for reappointment to the grade of lieutenant general and assignment to a different "position of importance and responsibility".

==== Vice Adm. Paul J. Bushong ====
Vice Admiral Paul J. Bushong of the United States Navy served as the U.S. Security Coordinator from October 2012 to December 2014. He was nominated as the Coordinator on June 8, 2012. Prior to this appointment, Admiral Bushong served as Commander, Navy Region Marianas/U.S. Pacific Command Representative, Guam, Commonwealth of the Northern Mariana Islands, Federated States of Micronesia, Republic of Palau/Commander, U.S. Naval Forces, Marianas, Guam.

==== Lt. Gen. Frederick S. Rudesheim ====
Lieutenant General Frederick S. Rudesheim of the United States Army served as the U.S. Security Coordinator from January 2015 to October 2017. Prior to this appointment, General Rudesheim served as the Vice Director of the U.S. military's Joint Staff. In October 2017 he retired from the United States Armed Forces and assumed his current position as the Director of the William J. Perry Center for Hemispheric Defense Studies in February 2018.

==== Lt. Gen. Eric P. Wendt ====
Lieutenant General Eric P. Wendt of the United States Army served as the U.S. Security Coordinator from November 2017 to October 2019. Prior to this appointment, General Wendt served as the Chief of Staff of United States Indo-Pacific Command. In November 2019, he assumed command of NATO's Special Operations Command.

==== Lt. Gen. Mark C. Schwartz ====
Lieutenant General Mark C. Schwartz of the United States Army served as the U.S. Security Coordinator from October 2019 to November 2021. Prior to his appointment, General Schwartz served as the Deputy Commander of Joint Special Operations Command, U.S. Special Operations Command.

==== Lt. Gen. Michael R. Fenzel ====
Lieutenant General Michael R. Fenzel of the United States Army serves as the U.S. Security Coordinator as of November 2021. Prior to his appointment, General Fenzel served as the Special Assistant to the Director of the Army Staff.

== Palestinian Authority Security Forces Training Program ==
=== Mission ===
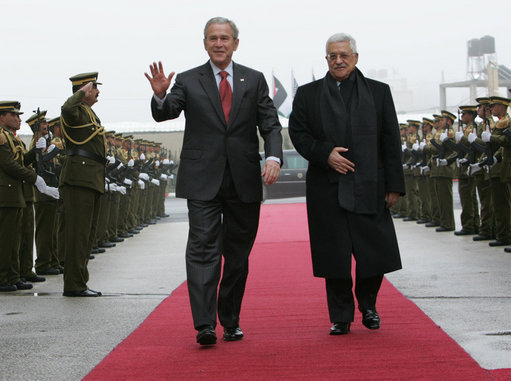
George W. Bush and Mahmoud Abbas stand before an honor cordon of the Palestinian Presidential Guard in Ramallah on January 10, 2008.

The USSC has focused on assistance to the uniformed services of the Palestinian Authority: the National Security Forces (NSF) and the Presidential Guard. They have mostly left security reform of the Palestinian Civil Police Force to other international organizations such as EU COPPS. The NSF is intended to eventually comprise 10 battalions of 500 troops each—one for each of nine governorates in the West Bank and one for reserve. There is no battalion for the Jerusalem governorate where the PA has no security control. The NSF is considered to be a "lightly armed and equipped gendarmerie-style force", which serves as a back-up to the regular police force in times of overwhelming need. They are expected to "function in small unit or company-size formations, in a military fashion" and have a comparable responsibility to Special Weapons and Tactics teams in U.S. police forces.

The National Security Forces of the Palestinian Authority have been the primary focus of attention by the USSC, though training and equipment has also been provided to the Presidential Guard, an elite force of four battalions with special functions such as protecting important officials and dignitaries.

The training program mission according to the GAO is: "to help the PA transform and professionalize its security forces by producing well trained, capable graduates able to perform security related duties supporting the Palestinian Civil Police of other duties as directed by the PA." In the words of Lt. Gen. Dayton, the training "features a US–Jordanian police training cadre and a U.S. developed curriculum that is heavy on human rights, proper use of force, riot control, and how to handle civil disturbances. The training is also focused on unit cohesion and leadership."

=== Trainees ===
Trainees are typically around 20–22 years of age, and due to the prospect of steady employment, there has been a high demand for the training, leading USSC officials to believe that the recruits are "top notch."

Potential recruits to the NSF are extensively vetted by the U.S. for any affiliation with a U.S.-designated foreign terrorist organization and for human rights violations (per Leahy Amendment legislation). The Israel Security Agency (Shin Bet), the Israeli Police, the Jordanians, and the Palestinian Authority all check the names of recruits before they are permitted to take part in the training. About 4.4% of new recruits are turned away on the basis of this screening.

On the basis of initial trainings, Lt. Gen. Dayton was impressed with the caliber of newly trained NSF troops. In his aforementioned public speech in 2009, he declared, "And what we have created—and I say this in humility—what we have created are new men." Dayton went on to explain, "upon the return of these new men of Palestine, they have shown motivation, discipline and professionalism, and they have made such a difference...."

=== Trainers ===
The actual training of troops is the work of Jordanian Public Security Directorate police trainers who teach in Arabic. They are assisted by Mobile Training Teams, composed of U.S. DynCorp contractors. In 2018 and early 2019 the training of troops transitioned from Jordanian police trainers to internal PASF trainers.

=== Training locations ===
The NSF battalions train at the Jordan International Police Training Center (JIPTC) outside of Amman, Jordan. According to Lt. Gen. Dayton, the rationale for choosing this location "is pretty simple. The Palestinians wanted to train in the region but they wanted to be away from clan, family, and political influences. The Israelis trust the Jordanians, and the Jordanians were anxious to help."

JIPTC, located 16 miles southeast of Amman, was built there in 2003 as a center for the U.S. to train Iraqi police.

As of Spring 2019, training previously conducted at JIPTC is now conducted inside the West Bank at the PASF's Central Training Institute, Jericho (CTI-J.

=== Course content ===
The curriculum is developed by the INL in consultation with the USSC, the Jordanian Public Security Directorate, and PA officials. In addition to the four-month basic training for new recruits, specialized courses are offered to train entire platoons or for individuals. In 2008 Senior Leadership courses were added to the program, which occur in Ramallah. Senior Leadership courses are arranged for 36 commanding officers (major, lieutenant colonel, colonel) led by a Palestinian major general with trainings conducted by U.S. contractors (DynCorp). In 2010, mid-level leadership courses were expected to begin for majors and captains.

The basic training is "a mix of classroom and practical exercises focused on the broad areas of firearms operations, crowd control, close quarters operations, patrolling, detainee operations, and checkpoint operations." The training is intended to "foster unity of command and build camaraderie."

=== Facilities construction ===
Some funds have been allocated to construct barracks and training centers inside the West Bank. The first completed project was the Presidential Guard College in Jericho finished in 2009 that can accommodate up to 700 troops. This facility cost $10.1 million. Another site in progress in Jericho trains NSF troops and is planned to develop into a larger PASF academy that will have a 2000-person capacity. The buildings are constructed by Palestinian workers under the supervision of U.S. and PA personnel. Other barracks are planned for each PA governorate, however U.S. permission from Israel to build on "Area B" land has not yet been successfully negotiated.

=== Equipment assistance ===
Each trained battalion is supplied by the USSC with non-lethal equipment such as vehicles, office equipment, medical equipment, riot gear, body armor, uniforms, and standard issue items. This equipment explicitly excludes weapons and ammunition and Lt. Gen. Dayton has stated, "we don't give out any guns or bullets."

All equipment is controlled carefully to ensure it is used in the manner approved by the USSC. DynCorp furnishes the equipment, which is warehoused by INL in Jerusalem until it receives approval from Israel for delivery to NSF troops in the West Bank. Also all of the equipment is inventoried and subject to end-use monitoring by the U.S. government. This process can be lengthy as noted by Dayton who explained, "We don't provide anything to the Palestinians unless it has been thoroughly coordinated with the state of Israel and they agree to it. Sometimes this process drives me crazy—I had a lot more hair when I started—but nevertheless, we make it work."

Palestinian security forces do receive some weapons from countries such as Jordan and Egypt, but they are subject to Israeli control and scrutiny and have been severely restricted.

=== Funding ===
The State Department has provided $392 million to date for the PASF training program, including $160 million for training purpose, $89 million for equipment, $99 million for construction and renovation of facilities, and $22 million for capacity building in the Ministry of Interior. Additionally $150 million has been requested for FY2011: $56 million for the training component, $33 million for more equipment, $53 million for further infrastructure projects, and $3 million for strategic capacity building.

=== Assessment ===
A few major instances of the deployment of USSC trained NSF troops have served as illustrations of their success by advocates of the program. The northern West Bank, especially the cities of Jenin and Nablus, is cited as such an example. From May–June 2008, the Palestinian Guard 3rd Battalion [trained by the U.S. at JIPTC] participated in a PA operation called "Operation Hope and Smile", which is reported to have cleared the area of gangs and illegal weapons as well as established "law and order" that received accolades from the community and internationally. In October 2008, PA troops including some trained in JIPTC, began "Operation Homeland Rising" in Hebron to improve public policing in certain neighborhoods. Their ability to avoid major confrontation with Israeli settlers and their apprehension of Hamas members earned them accolades from officials in the U.S., Israel, and PA. Lastly, an operation in April 2009 in Qalqilya in which PA troops uncovered a weapons lab inside a mosque and a workshop containing 80 kg of explosives was a major counterterrorism activity that led to a number of clashes between PA troops and Hamas members in the area. Ultimately 5 Hamas members, 4 PASF troops, and 1 civilian lost their lives over the period of confrontation, but PA, U.S., and Israeli officials were pleased with the operation, which killed a wanted Hamas military commander.

When the Israeli Air Force began their bombing campaign of Gaza in late December 2008, the NSF 3rd Special Battalion was disbursed throughout the West Bank to assist other PA security forces in maintaining order and preventing demonstrations from becoming uncontrollable. The USSC, Israel, and the PA regarded the results of this deployment to be successful because West Bank violence did not escalate during the month-long Israeli offensive. Lt. Gen. Dayton suggested in his 2009 policy speech that the PA response during Operation Cast Lead prevented a third intifada by using "a measured and disciplined approach to the popular unrest" and by keeping demonstrators away from Israelis. In his words "the prospect of order trumped the prospect of chaos." Journalist Nathan Thrall characterized the same event as the most damaging to the Palestinian security forces' reputation, as the harsh reaction to protests and to Hamas sympathizers made the PASF seem like collaborators with the Israeli operation.

The U.S. Government Accountability Office undertook an audit of the USSC training program between July 2009 – May 2010 and published their report "Palestinian Authority: U.S. Assistance is Training and Equipping Security Forces, but the Program Needs to Measure Progress and Faces Logistical Constraints" based on their findings. The GAO report (GAO-10-505) concludes that the USSC has "not established clear and measurable outcome-based performance indicators" to assess their programming though the GAO strongly encourages the development of these indicators. In addition, the GAO notes the logistical constraints of waiting for Israeli government approval to construct facilities or for the U.S. to ship equipment to the Palestinian territories. Furthermore, the gains made in training PASF forces may not be sustainable due to the "lack of capacity in the civil police and the justice sectors" with which security forces must collaborate.

Some questions have been raised regarding the efficacy and methods of the USSC training program. The International Crisis Group report from September 7, 2010, entitled "Squaring the Circle: Palestinian Security Reform under Occupation," several cautious notes. They write that the vetting process for recruits "has a clear political component," as attested to by an interviewee who stated that the NSF does not represent the whole society, such as those with inclinations towards Islamic groups of any sort have difficulty participating. Also, in response to claims of improvement in the PASF, the International Crisis Group raises the possibility of other factors, such as Israeli cooperation, playing a significant role in the performance of troops.

The report focuses in addition on concerns about the leadership of the USSC, particularly Lt. Gen. Dayton, who played a very central role in the daily work of the program yet had "a poor personal relationship" with certain senior PA officials like Prime Minister Salam Fayyad and U.S. officials in the Obama administration. While Dayton is perceived favorably by many in the U.S., Israel, and in the Palestinian territories, his previously mentioned speech in 2009 earned him ire from some Palestinians who felt belittled by his statements, especially when he claimed credit for making the security forces 'new men.' Hamas officials coined the phrase "the Dayton troops" to refer to the security forces being trained by the U.S. and they criticized the PA for their collaboration with the U.S. and Israel on security reform. The PA formally complained to the U.S. about Dayton's speech, saying that it undermined their legitimacy to the public. Rising tensions after the speech led Dayton to decrease his public profile.

== Criticisms of U.S. Security Assistance to the Palestinian Authority ==
=== American concerns ===
In June 2010, an article by Mark Perry in Foreign Policy online entitled, “Red Team: CENTCOM thinks outside the box on Hamas and Hezbollah,” addressed the dissent amongst U.S. military officials regarding the strategy of isolating Hamas from the Palestinian Authority. A "Red Team" usually represents a viewpoint challenging the establishment's strategic perspective, and does not represent the official U.S. policy. The Red Team report suggested that Fatah–Hamas reconciliation along with a renunciation of violence by Hamas would be necessary to help peace talks succeed and so they recommended working towards a unified Palestinian security force. According to Perry, "CENTCOM's Red Team distances itself from the U.S. effort to provide training to the Fatah-controlled security forces in the West Bank, which began during George W. Bush's administration. While that effort, currently headed by Lt. Gen. Keith Dayton, is not mentioned specifically in the report, the Red Team makes it clear that it believes that such initiatives will fail unless the Israelis and Palestinians negotiate an end to the conflict."

Retired U.S. Colonel Philip J. Dermer, a former member of the USSC mission and advisor to then Lt. Gen. Keith Dayton, wrote a document expressing similar sentiments after traveling to the region, which was shared with his colleagues in USSC before being published. He took issue with the restrictive travel policies that prevent U.S. employees from traversing the West Bank to see the situation firsthand, saying that the few official meetings do not allow the USSC to grasp the context or to develop "viable, not pie-in-the-sky, options to move forward." After commenting on a few successful elements of the program in his opinion, such as the leadership of Lt. Gen. Dayton, Dermer outlined five areas of concern:

1. Palestinians are skeptical about whether the changes will be permanent and ultimately effective.
2. Palestinians are indignant about the U.S. taking credit for the program in public.
3. The USSC mission is undefined and the desired end result is unclear.
4. The USSC efforts are not strategically supported by other U.S. and international actors in the region.
5. There is no strategic document outlying the roles and responsibilities of the important U.S. and international players, showing how the organizations can work towards a common vision.

=== Palestinian concerns ===
The role of the earliest USSC mission under Lt. Gen. Kip Ward was criticized by a senior officer of the PA security sector in his article "Reconstructing the PNA Security Organizations" under the pseudonym Ahmad Hussein. According to Hussein, the Security Assessment Initiative was discredited by its public relations policy and did not succeed in communicating the needs of the PA security sector to international donors. Additionally he saw the USSC team as focused too much on the Israeli disengagement plan and not concerned enough with long-term reforms of the security forces.

The PASF training program under Lt. Gen. Keith Dayton and the subsequent troop deployment in the West Bank have raised concerns among some Palestinians who accuse the NSF and the Presidential Guard of restricting civil liberties and violating human rights. In "A Prescription for Civil War" by Jon Elmer, several Palestinians in the West Bank are interviewed and express their fears of being apprehended by security forces for their political leanings. Additionally, members of Hamas view the U.S. training program to be instigating violent conflict rather than reconciliation between Hamas and Fatah. One Islamist leader is quoted as asking, "if they attack your mosques, your classrooms, your societies, you can be patient, but for how long?"

A Ma'an News story from March 2010 about the Dayton mission references a number of complaints raised by Palestinians regarding the PASF training program. Some detractors see the troops as merely the means for the consolidation of Fatah party dominance and power over all other political groups. According to Ma'an, "There is also concern that the training provided by the USSC is leading to a situation where Palestinian security forces effectively take over the occupation from Israel forces, as opposed to operating as a truly independent national force accountable to the majority." According to Tahani Mustaf, an Israel-Palestine expert at the International Crisis Group, "[The Americans] have been training the PA security forces to act as SWAT teams and special forces – not as civil police – to crack down on [Palestinian] armed groups."

=== Israeli concerns ===
Some Israelis have raised concerns that the PASF training program represents a threat to the state of Israel and its armed forces. In the August 2010 Jerusalem Post opinion article "Is the U.S. training Israel's enemies?," David Bedein and Arlene Kushner express doubts regarding the loyalties of Palestinian forces and argue that the troops being trained by the United States could use the skills and equipment in armed conflict with Israel rather than to police the Palestinian Authority. They write, "the fear that Palestinian troops may turn their weapons on the IDF stems from the precedent of what occurred with the outbreak of the second intifada 10 years ago, when Palestinian troops nurtured and trained by the U.S. and even by the IDF engaged in a fullscale armed action against Israel." In addition to the op-ed, Bedein has written a report for the Center for Near East Policy Research that elaborates on his critiques of U.S. security assistance to the PA.

== See also ==
- International aid to Palestinians
