= Murder of Richard Collins III =

2017 murder in Maryland

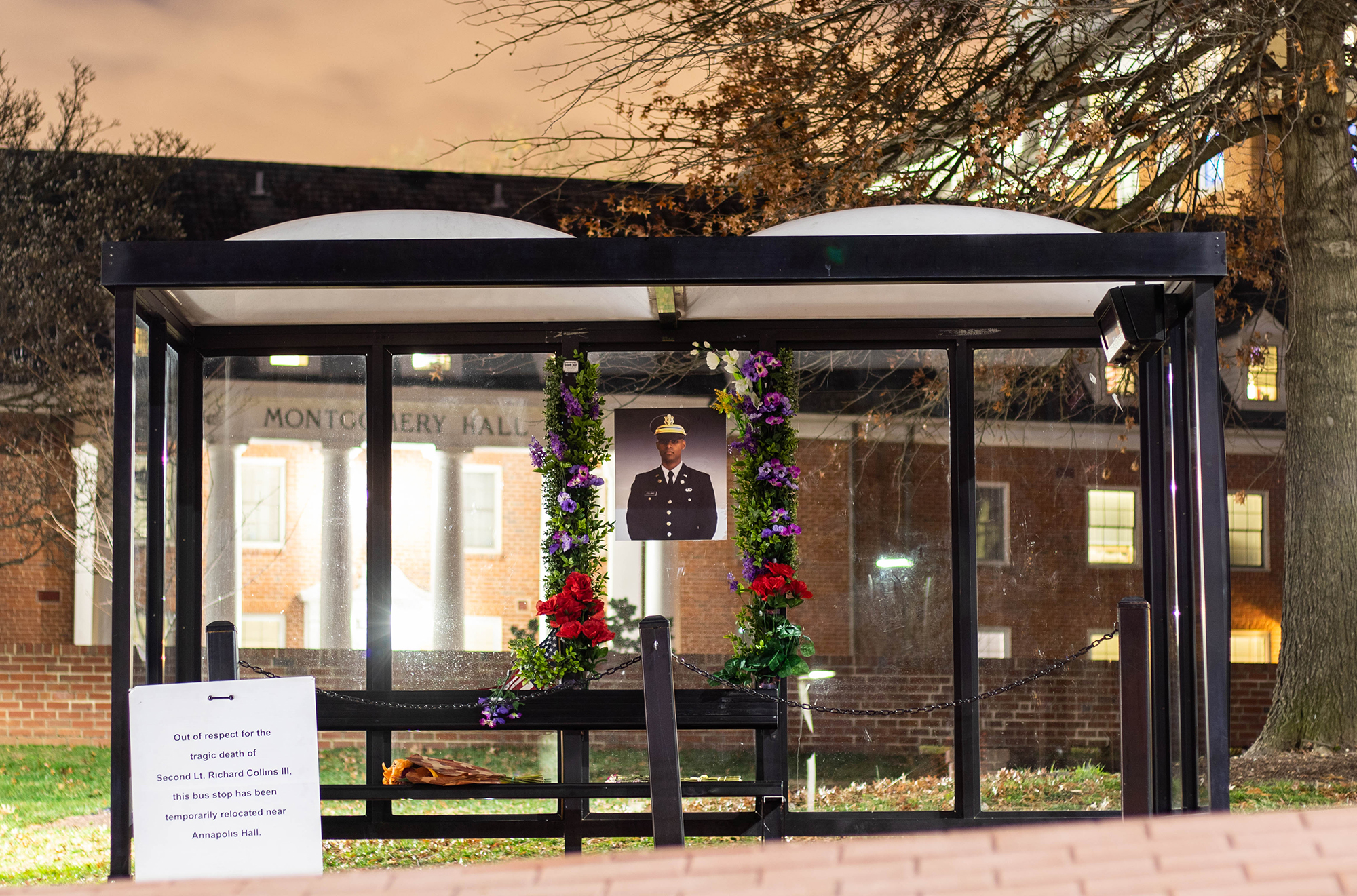
- The site of the murder, a Shuttle-UM stop near Montgomery Hall on the University of Maryland campus, in December 2019. The bus stop was later razed after a memorial to Collins was dedicated nearby.
- Location: College Park, Maryland, U.S.
- Date: May 20, 2017 around 3:00 AM (UTC−05:00)
- Target: Richard Collins III
- Attack type: Murder by stabbing
- Victim: Richard Collins III (killed)
- Perpetrator: Sean Urbanski
- Motive: Unknown, purported to be white supremacy

The murder of Richard Collins III occurred on May 20, 2017, while Collins and friends waited for an Uber to arrive around 3 AM near Montgomery Hall on the University of Maryland, College Park campus. Twenty-two year old University of Maryland senior Sean Urbanski emerged from a wooded area, screamed at the group, and proceeded to stab Collins, who later died of his wounds.

Due to Urbanski's online involvement with far-right politics and the alt-right, many condemned Urbanski's actions as a hate crime. The Federal Bureau of Investigation declined to investigate the perceived hate crime at the federal level, but Urbanski still faced hate crime charges in Prince George's County court. After a trial delayed four times, a jury found Urbanski guilty of first-degree murder in December 2019. The hate crime charge was dismissed by the judge due to lack of evidence. On January 14, 2021, Urbanski was sentenced to life in prison, with the possibility of parole.

== Incident ==
On the night of May 19, Collins sent a text to his Reserve Officers' Training Corps (ROTC) group chat inquiring if anyone might be interested in traveling to College Park for a night out. Many of his fellow cadets were out training, so Collins elected to go by himself. Around 3 AM, while Collins and two friends (a white man and an Asian woman) waited for an Uber at a bus stop near the University of Maryland's Montgomery Hall dormitory, Sean Urbanski emerged from a nearby wooded area screaming at the group, telling Collins "Step left, step left if you know what's good for you." Collins refused, and Urbanski stabbed him in the chest. Collins died later at an area hospital, while police apprehended Urbanski on a nearby bench without incident.

=== Victim ===
Collins, 23, was an ROTC candidate at Bowie State University, set to graduate and begin his commission in the Army as a 2nd Lieutenant. Collins, who was the 3rd generation of his family to join the military, attended Annapolis Area Christian School, where he played soccer and lacrosse. Montrose Robinson, head of Bowie State's ROTC recruiting, described Collins as "a star, a model cadet," adding that "[h]e excelled in physical training, and he was an excellent student. He wanted to be a general officer, and he had what it would take to be a general."

=== Perpetrator ===
Sean Urbanski, 22 at the time of the incident, was a senior at the University of Maryland and grew up in Severna Park, Maryland. Urbanski began school as an engineering major, but dropped out after his first year. After attending Anne Arundel Community College, Urbanski re-enrolled at Maryland as a kinesiology major in 2016. Urbanski's affiliation with an alt-right Facebook group known as "Alt-Reich: Nation", as well as Urbanski's possession of racist images on his phone, became a major point of contention for his trial. Responding to the page Urbanski belonged to, University of Maryland police chief said "When I look at the information that’s contained on that website, suffice it to say that it’s despicable, it shows extreme bias against women, Latinos, persons of Jewish faith and especially African Americans.”

== Trial ==
=== Delays ===
After Urbanski's indictment, his trial was delayed four times. Initially set for January 2018, Urbanski's lawyers requested the first and second delays (pushing the trial to 2019), claiming a large amount of video to review, and in light of motions filed to bar Urbanski's phone as evidence and splitting the murder and hate crime trials up. State prosecutors requested the third delay, for a July 2019 court date, due to personnel turnover in the Prince George's County state's attorney's office. In July 2019, after a judge ruled Urbanski would face hate crime charges, his legal team requested a fourth delay to December 2019, citing a need to more fully review evidence from Urbanski's phone, which the judge granted.

=== Proceedings ===
Urbanski's trial began on December 11, 2019. The early proceedings of the trial hinged on Urbanski's hate crime charge. Deriving an argument from the racist memes found on Urbanski's phone and that surveillance video obtained showed Urbanski approaching Collins with a knife drawn, the prosecution argued that the crime was racially motivated. Urbanski's lawyers chiefly argued that he was too drunk to premeditate a killing, and that the state could not show sufficient cause from the images on Urbanski's phone alone. They also showed video of Urbanski singing and urinating into a drain after being placed in jail. The prosecution countered by showing body camera footage from Urbanski's arrest that showed him "speaking clearly and [walking] without assistance" and following police orders despite being visibly confused.

The following week, Judge Lawrence Hill dropped the hate crime charge against Urbanski, calling the state's position "utter speculation" and stating that they failed to provide enough evidence that Urbanski targeted Collins solely on the virtue of his race. Solomon Comissiong, president of the university's Black Faculty and Staff Association, said he was "unsettled" by the ruling, and believed there was a correlation between Urbanski's racist online community and his actions.

=== Verdict ===
The prosecution, as before, largely rested their case on surveillance video and witness testimony that showed Urbanski approaching Collins with a knife drawn, and his apparently calm and collected behavior afterward. Urbanski's lawyers also relied on their former arguments, that Urbanski was simply too drunk to have planned a murder, calling the single stab wound that killed Collins "fluke-ish."

Jurors deliberated for under two hours, finding Urbanski guilty of first-degree murder. Originally scheduled for April 16th, 2020, Urbanski's sentencing was delayed due to the COVID-19 pandemic, but on January 15, 2021, he was ultimately sentenced to life with the possibility of parole.

== Reaction and response ==
=== Congressional ===
Anthony Brown, one of Maryland's former House representatives, introduced a resolution (co-signed by 55 other congresspersons) a few days later calling the murder "racially motivated."

=== University of Maryland, College Park ===
University president Wallace Loh faced criticism after Collins' murder due to a perceived failure to admit accountability for the incident. Journalist Dave Zirin compared Loh's response to Collins' murder with his response to the scandal over the death of football player Jordan McNair where Loh stated that the university "took moral and legal responsibility" for McNair's death. Loh also faced student criticism in the years following the incident for inaction in memorializing Collins and for remarks made at a commemorative panel. Students from both Bowie State and the University of Maryland also criticized Loh for missing a joint panel coordinated with Bowie State to address racial climate on both the schools' campuses. One study that interviewed 12 Black graduate students at the University of Maryland found that these students felt "othered, marginalized, and silenced" because of Loh's response to racist incidents at the university including but not limited to Collins' murder.

== Legacy ==
Collins' family, with help from Maryland State Senators Thomas V. Miller Jr. and Douglas J. J. Peters, started the 2nd Lt. Richard W. Collins III Foundation in Collins' memory. The foundation provides support to ROTC cadets at Maryland's historically black colleges and universities, including Collins' alma mater Bowie State University, as well as Morgan State University, Coppin State University, and the University of Maryland, Eastern Shore. Funding secured by the foundation has also been used to provide 826 scholarships to students at historically Black colleges and universities. In collaboration with Bowie State University and the University of Maryland, the foundation also launched the BSU-UMD Social Justice Alliance. This alliance supports a variety of initiatives, such as public symposia and workshops, to "combat intolerance and promote social justice and equity for all."

In March 2020, the Maryland legislature passed the 2nd Lieutenant Richard Collins III Law, which amended Maryland's hate crime statutes to have an act of violence against a protected class motivated by hate "either in whole or in substantial part" be considered a hate crime. Collins' family and the Prince George's County State Attorney advocated for the changes due to the dropping of Urbanski's hate charge and a lack of any convictions under the statute in 2019.

In March 2022, the University of Maryland announced that they were beginning construction on a memorial plaza to Collins that overlooks the site of the murder. On May 16, 2022, the memorial plaza was dedicated to Collins, with many speakers discussing the urgent need to end white supremacy which had also led to the murder of ten African Americans just two days prior in the Buffalo mass shooting.
