= List of active duty United States three-star officers =

Active duty US three-star military officers

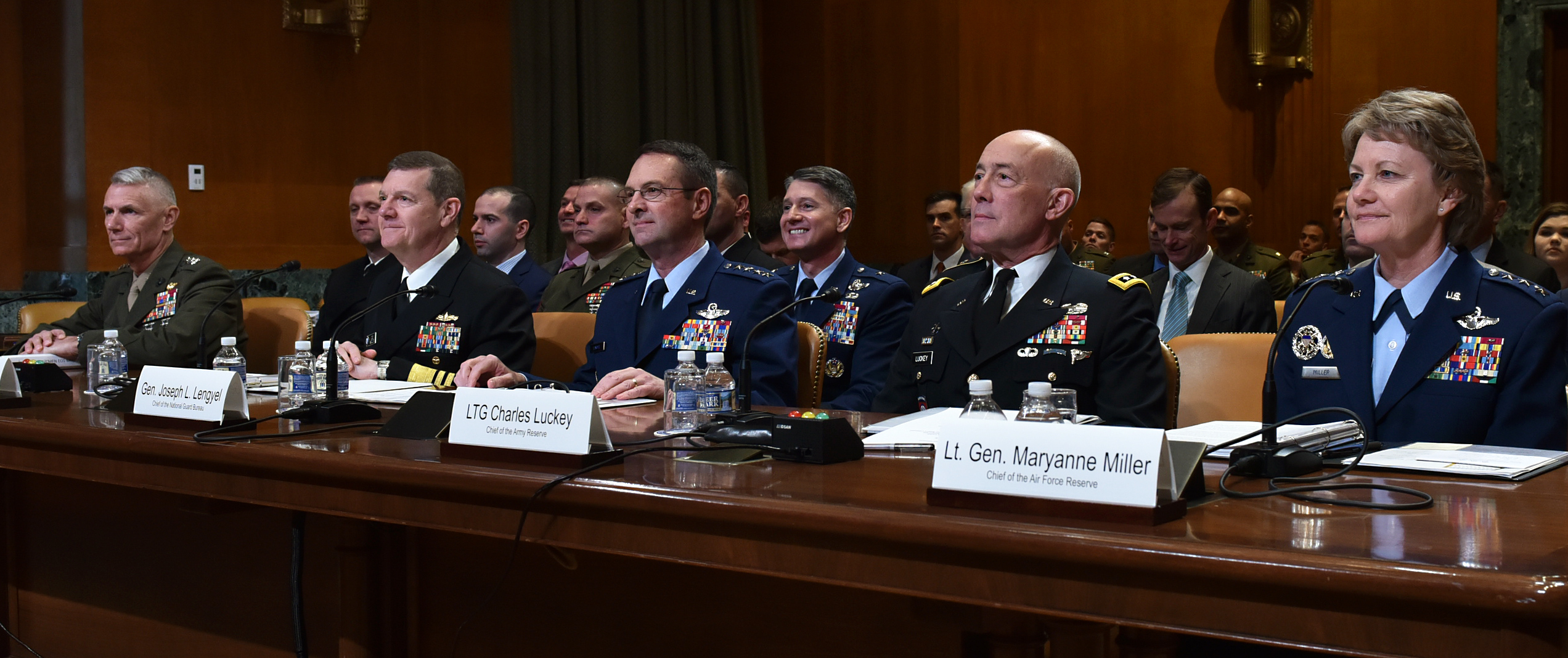
Three-star reserve officers and the chief of the National Guard Bureau testify before the Senate Appropriations Subcommittee on Defense on 17 April 2018.

There are currently 168 active-duty three-star officers in the uniformed services of the United States. There are 57 in the Army, 28 in the Marine Corps, 33 in the Navy, 37 in the Air Force, six in the Space Force, four in the Coast Guard, none in the Public Health Service Commissioned Corps, and none in the NOAA Commissioned Officer Corps.

== List of designated three-star positions ==
=== Department of Defense ===
Position insignia	Position	Photo	Incumbent	Service branch
Office of the Secretary of Defense
Office of the Secretary of Defense	Senior Military Assistant to the Secretary of Defense (SMA SecWar)		Vice Admiral; John F.G. Wade	U.S. Navy
Office of the Secretary of Defense	Director, Warfighter Support, Office of the Under Secretary of War for Intelligence and Security		Lieutenant General; Constantin E. Nicolet	U.S. Army
National intelligence agencies
Defense Intelligence Agency	Director, Defense Intelligence Agency (DIA)		Lieutenant General; James H. Adams III	U.S. Marine Corps
National Geospatial-Intelligence Agency	Director, National Geospatial-Intelligence Agency (NGA)		Lieutenant General; Michele H. Bredenkamp	U.S. Army
Defense Agencies
Defense Contract Management Agency	Director, Defense Contract Management Agency (DCMA)		Vice Admiral; Stephen R. Tedford	U.S. Navy
Defense Health Agency	Director, Defense Health Agency (DHA)		Vice Admiral; Darin K. Via	U.S. Navy
Defense Information Systems Agency Department of Defense Cyber Defense Command	Director, Defense Information Systems Agency (DISA) and Commander, Department of Defense Cyber Defense Command (DCDC)		Lieutenant General; Paul T. Stanton	U.S. Army
Defense Logistics Agency	Director, Defense Logistics Agency (DLA)		Lieutenant General; David J. Sanford	U.S. Air Force
Missile Defense Agency	Director, Missile Defense Agency (MDA)		Lieutenant General; Heath A. Collins	U.S. Air Force

==== Joint Staff ====
Position insignia	Position	Photo	Incumbent	Service branch
Office of the Joint Staff
Joint Staff	Director of the Joint Staff (DJS)		Vice Admiral; Paul Spedero Jr.	U.S. Navy
Joint Staff directorates
Joint Staff	Director for Intelligence (J-2), Joint Staff		Vice Admiral; Thomas M. Henderschedt	U.S. Navy
Joint Staff	Director for Operations (J-3), Joint Staff		Lieutenant General; David L. Odom	U.S. Marine Corps
Joint Staff	Director for Logistics (J-4), Joint Staff		Lieutenant General; Keith D. Reventlow	U.S. Marine Corps
Joint Staff	Director for Strategy, Plans and Policy (J-5), Joint Staff and Senior Member, U.S. Delegation to the United Nations Military Staff Committee		Vacant	U.S. Army
Joint Staff	Director for Command, Control, Communications and Computers (C4) and Cyber and Chief Information Officer (J-6), Joint Staff		Lieutenant General; David T. Isaacson	U.S. Army
Joint Staff	Director for Joint Force Development (J-7), Joint Staff		Lieutenant General; Stephen E. Liszewski	U.S. Marine Corps
Joint Staff	Director of Force Structure, Resources and Assessment (J-8), Joint Staff		Lieutenant General; Steven P. Whitney	U.S. Space Force

==== Unified combatant commands ====
Position insignia	Position	Photo	Incumbent	Service branch
U.S. Africa Command	Deputy Commander, U.S. Africa Command (USAFRICOM)		Lieutenant General; John W. Brennan Jr.	U.S. Army
U.S. Central Command	Deputy Commander, U.S. Central Command (USCENTCOM)		Lieutenant General; Patrick D. Frank	U.S. Army
U.S. Cyber Command	Deputy Commander, U.S. Cyber Command (USCYBERCOM)		Lieutenant General; Lorna M. Mahlock	U.S. Marine Corps
U.S. European Command	Deputy Commander, U.S. European Command (USEUCOM)		Lieutenant General; Curtis D. Taylor	U.S. Marine Corps
U.S. Northern Command North American Aerospace Defense Command	Deputy Commander, U.S. Northern Command (USNORTHCOM) and Vice Commander, U.S. Element, North American Aerospace Defense Command (NORAD)		Lieutenant General; Joseph F. Jarrad	U.S. Army
U.S. Pacific Command	Deputy Commander, U.S. Pacific Command (USINDOPACOM)		Lieutenant General; George B. Rowell	U.S. Marine Corps
U.S. Southern Command	Military Deputy Commander, U.S. Southern Command (USSOUTHCOM)		Lieutenant General; Clair A. Gill	U.S. Army
U.S. Space Command	Deputy Commander, U.S. Space Command (USSPACECOM)		Lieutenant General; Richard L. Zellmann	U.S. Army
U.S. Special Operations Command	Deputy Commander, U.S. Special Operations Command (USSOCOM)		Lieutenant General; Sean M. Farrell	U.S. Air Force
U.S. Special Operations Command	Vice Commander, U.S. Special Operations Command (USSOCOM)		Lieutenant General; Steven M. Marks	U.S. Army
U.S. Strategic Command	Deputy Commander, U.S. Strategic Command (USSTRATCOM)		Lieutenant General; Michael J. Lutton	U.S. Air Force
U.S. Transportation Command	Deputy Commander, U.S. Transportation Command (USTRANSCOM)		Lieutenant General; Jered P. Helwig	U.S. Army

==== Other joint positions ====
Position insignia	Position	Photo	Incumbent	Service branch
Sub-unified commands
U.S. Forces Korea Seventh Air Force (Air Forces Korea)	South Korea; Deputy Commander, U.S. Forces Korea (USFK), Commander, Air Component Command, United Nations Command (UNC), Commander, Air Component Command, ROK/U.S. Combined Forces Command (CFC) and Commander, Seventh Air Force (Air Forces Korea) (7 AF)		Lieutenant General; David G. Shoemaker	U.S. Air Force
Alaskan NORAD Region Alaskan Command Eleventh Air Force	Commander, Alaskan NORAD Region (ANR), Commander, Alaskan Command (ALCOM), and Commander, Eleventh Air Force (11 AF)		Lieutenant General; Robert D. Davis	U.S. Air Force
Joint Special Operations Command	Commander, Joint Special Operations Command (JSOC) and Commander, Joint Special Operations Command Forward, U.S. Special Operations Command		Lieutenant General; Jonathan P. Braga	U.S. Army
Special activities (domestic)
National Defense University	President, National Defense University (NDU)		Vice Admiral; Peter A. Garvin	U.S. Navy
F-35 Lightning II Joint Program Office	Program Executive Officer, F-35 Lightning II Joint Program Office		Lieutenant General; Gregory L. Masiello	U.S. Marine Corps
Office of the Director of National Intelligence	Director's Advisor for Military Affairs, Office of the Director of National Intelligence (ODNI)		Lieutenant General; Melvin G. Carter	U.S. Marine Corps
Central Intelligence Agency	Associate Director for Military Affairs, Central Intelligence Agency (CIA)		Lieutenant General; Michael L. Downs	U.S. Air Force
Office of the Secretary of Defense	Deputy Direct Reporting Program Manager for Golden Dome for America (GDA DRPM)		Lieutenant General; Brian W. Gibson	U.S. Army
Office of the Secretary of Defense	Submarine Direct Reporting Portfolio Manager		Vice Admiral; Robert M. Gaucher	U.S. Navy
Office of the Secretary of Defense	Military Deputy, Direct Reporting Portfolio Manager for Critical Major Weapon Systems		Lieutenant General; Mark B. Pye	U.S. Air Force
Special activities (international)
Deputy Chair of the NATO Military Committee	Deputy Chair of the NATO Military Committee (DCMC)		Lieutenant General; Winston P. Brooks Jr.	U.S. Army
NATO Military Committee	U.S. Military Representative to the NATO Military Committee (USMILREP)		Lieutenant General; William D. Taylor	U.S. Army
Allied Special Operations Forces Command Special Operations Command Europe	Commander, Allied Special Operations Forces Command (SOFCOM) and Commander, Special Operations Command Europe (SOCEUR)		Lieutenant General; Richard E. Angle	U.S. Army
Allied Command Transformation	Deputy Chief of Staff for Capability Development, Headquarters Allied Command Transformation (ACT)		Lieutenant General; Marcus B. Annibale	U.S. Marine Corps
	Germany; Commander, Security Assistance Group – Ukraine (SAG-U) and Commander, NATO Security Assistance and Training for Ukraine (NSATU), Operation Atlantic Resolve (OAR)		Lieutenant General; Guillaume N. Beaurpere	U.S. Army
U.S. Forces Japan	Japan; Commander, U.S. Forces Japan (USFJ)		Lieutenant General; Stephen F. Jost	U.S. Air Force
Embassy of the United States, Jerusalem	Israel; U.S. Security Coordinator for Israel and the Palestinian National Authority (USSC)		Lieutenant General; Sean M. Salene	U.S. Marine Corps

=== Department of the Army ===
Position insignia	Position	Photo	Incumbent	Service branch
Office of the Secretary
ASAALT	Portfolio Acquisition Executive for Fires (PAE Fires)		Lieutenant General; Francisco J. Lozano	U.S. Army
Office of the Assistant Secretary of the Army (Financial Management and Comptroller)	Military Deputy for Budget to the Assistant Secretary of the Army (Financial Management and Comptroller)		Lieutenant General; Mark S. Bennett	U.S. Army
U.S. Army Acquisition Corps	Principal Military Deputy to the Assistant Secretary of the Army (Acquisition, Logistics and Technology) and Director, U.S. Army Acquisition Corps (AAC)		Lieutenant General; Robert M. Collins	U.S. Army
Inspector General of the United States Army	Inspector General of the United States Army (IG)		Lieutenant General; Gregory J. Brady	U.S. Army

==== United States Army ====
Position insignia	Position	Photo	Incumbent	Service branch
Army Staff
Director of the Army Staff	Director of the Army Staff (DAS)		Lieutenant General; Marcus S. Evans	U.S. Army
Deputy Chief of Staff for Personnel (G-1)	Deputy Chief of Staff for Personnel (G-1)		Lieutenant General; Charles T. Lombardo	U.S. Army
Deputy Chief of Staff for Intelligence (G-2)	Deputy Chief of Staff for Intelligence (G-2)		Lieutenant General; Michelle A. Schmidt	U.S. Army
Deputy Chief of Staff for Operations, Plans and Training (G-3/5/7)	Deputy Chief of Staff for Operations, Plans and Training (G-3/5/7)		Lieutenant General; Brian S. Eifler	U.S. Army
Deputy Chief of Staff for Logistics (G-4)	Deputy Chief of Staff for Logistics (G-4)		Lieutenant General; Michelle K. Donahue	U.S. Army
Deputy Chief of Staff for Command, Control, Communications, Cyber Operations and Networks (G-6)	Deputy Chief of Staff for Command, Control, Communications, Cyber Operations and Networks (G-6)		Lieutenant General; Jeth B. Rey	U.S. Army
Deputy Chief of Staff for Programs (G-8)	Deputy Chief of Staff for Programs (G-8)		Lieutenant General; Peter N. Benchoff	U.S. Army
Army commands (and subordinated units)
U.S. Army Materiel Command	Commanding General, U.S. Army Materiel Command (AMC)		Vacant	U.S. Army
U.S. Army Materiel Command	Deputy Commanding General, U.S. Army Materiel Command (AMC)		Lieutenant General; Gavin A. Lawrence	U.S. Army
U.S. Army Installation Management Command	Commanding General, U.S. Army Installation Management Command (IMCOM)		Lieutenant General; James M. Smith	U.S. Army
U.S. Army Transformation and Training Command	Deputy Commanding General, U.S. Army Transformation and Training Command (T2COM)		Lieutenant General; Edmond Brown	U.S. Army
U.S. Army Futures and Concepts Command	Commanding General, U.S. Army Futures and Concepts Command (FCC) and Commanding General, Fort Eustis		Lieutenant General; Michael C. McCurry II	U.S. Army
U.S. Army Combined Arms Command	Commanding General, U.S. Army Combined Arms Command (USACAC) and Commanding General, Fort Leavenworth		Lieutenant General; James P. Isenhower III	U.S. Army
U.S. Army Recruiting Command	Commanding General, U.S. Army Recruiting Command (USAREC)		Lieutenant General; Johnny K. Davis	U.S. Army
Army service component commands
U.S. Army Western Hemisphere Command	Deputy Commanding General, U.S. Army Western Hemisphere Command (USAWHC)		Vacant	U.S. Army
U.S. Army Pacific	Deputy Commanding General, U.S. Army Pacific (USARPAC)		Lieutenant General; Joel B. Vowell	U.S. Army
U.S. Army Europe and Africa Allied Land Command	Commanding General, U.S. Army Europe and Africa (USAREUR-AF) and Commander, Allied Land Command (LANDCOM)		Vacant	U.S. Army
U.S. Army Central	Commanding General, U.S. Army Central (ARCENT) and Commanding General, Coalition Forces Land Component Command (CFLCC)		Lieutenant General; Kevin C. Leahy	U.S. Army
U.S. Army Special Operations Command	Commanding General, U.S. Army Special Operations Command (USASOC)		Lieutenant General; Lawrence G. Ferguson	U.S. Army
U.S. Army Space and Missile Defense Command Joint Functional Component Command for Integrated Missile Defense	Commanding General, U.S. Army Space and Missile Defense Command/U.S. Army Forces Strategic Command (USASMDC/ARSTRAT) and Commander, Joint Functional Component Command for Integrated Missile Defense (JFCC IMD)		Lieutenant General; John L. Rafferty Jr.	U.S. Army
U.S. Army Cyber Command Joint Force Headquarters – Cyber (Army)	Commanding General, U.S. Army Cyber Command (ARCYBER) and Commander, Joint Force Headquarters – Cyber (Army) [JFHQ-C (Army)]		Lieutenant General; Christopher L. Eubank	U.S. Army
Direct reporting units
U.S. Army Chief of Engineers U.S. Army Corps of Engineers	United States Army Chief of Engineers (COE) and Commanding General, U.S. Army Corps of Engineers (USACE)		Lieutenant General; William H. Graham Jr.	U.S. Army
Surgeon General of the United States Army U.S. Army Medical Command Army Medical Department	Surgeon General of the United States Army (TSG), Commanding General, U.S. Army Medical Command (MEDCOM) and Chief, Army Medical Department (AMEDD)		Lieutenant General; Mary K. Izaguirre	U.S. Army
U.S. Military Academy	Superintendent of the United States Military Academy (USMA)		Lieutenant General; James B. Bartholomees III	U.S. Army
Chief of the United States Army Reserve U.S. Army Reserve Command	Chief of the United States Army Reserve (CAR) and Commanding General, U.S. Army Reserve Command (USARC)		Lieutenant General; Robert D. Harter	U.S. Army
Operating forces
Eighth Army ROK/U.S. Combined Forces Command	Commanding General, Eighth Army and Chief of Staff, ROK/U.S. Combined Forces Command (CFC)		Lieutenant General; Joseph E. Hilbert	U.S. Army
I Corps	Commanding General, I Corps and Commanding General, Joint Base Lewis–McChord		Lieutenant General; Matthew W. McFarlane	U.S. Army
III Armored Corps	Commanding General, III Armored Corps and Commanding General, Fort Hood		Lieutenant General; Kevin D. Admiral	U.S. Army
V Corps	Commanding General, V Corps		Lieutenant General; Thomas M. Feltey	U.S. Army
First Army	Commanding General, First Army		Lieutenant General; Monte L. Rone	U.S. Army
XVIII Airborne Corps	Commanding General, XVIII Airborne Corps and Commanding General, Fort Bragg		Lieutenant General; Gregory K. Anderson	U.S. Army
Army National Guard
Army National Guard	Director, Army National Guard (ARNG)		Lieutenant General; Jonathan M. Stubbs	U.S. Army

=== Department of the Navy ===
Position insignia	Position	Photo	Incumbent	Service branch
Office of the Secretary
Office of the Assistant Secretary of the Navy (Research, Development and Acquisition)	Principal Military Deputy Assistant Secretary of the Navy (Research, Development and Acquisition)		Vice Admiral; E. Seiko Okano	U.S. Navy
Naval Inspector General	Naval Inspector General (NAVIG) and Special Assistant for Inspection Support (N09G)		Vice Admiral; M. Wayne Baze	U.S. Navy

==== United States Marine Corps ====
Position insignia	Position	Photo	Incumbent	Service branch
Headquarters Marine Corps
Office of the Director, Marine Corps Staff	Director of the Marine Corps Staff (DMCS)		Lieutenant General; Paul J. Rock Jr.	U.S. Marine Corps
Manpower and Reserve Affairs, Headquarters Marine Corps	Deputy Commandant for Manpower and Reserve Affairs (DC M&RA)		Lieutenant General; William J. Bowers	U.S. Marine Corps
Plans, Policies and Operations, Headquarters Marine Corps	Deputy Commandant for Plans, Policies and Operations (DC PP&O)		Lieutenant General; Jay M. Bargeron	U.S. Marine Corps
Deputy Commandant for Aviation	Deputy Commandant for Aviation (DCA)		Lieutenant General; William H. Swan	U.S. Marine Corps
Installations and Logistics, Headquarters Marine Corps	Deputy Commandant for Installations and Logistics (DC I&L)		Lieutenant General; Andrew Niebel	U.S. Marine Corps
Combat Development and Integration, Headquarters Marine Corps Marine Corps Combat Development Command	Deputy Commandant for Combat Development and Integration (DC CD&I) and Commanding General, Marine Corps Combat Development Command (MCCDC)		Lieutenant General; Eric E. Austin	U.S. Marine Corps
Headquarters Marine Corps	Deputy Commandant for Programs and Resources (DC P&R)		Lieutenant General; James B. Wellons	U.S. Marine Corps
Deputy Commandant for Information Marine Corps Intelligence	Deputy Commandant for Information (DCI) and Commander, U.S. Marine Corps Forces Strategic Command (MARFORSTRAT)		Lieutenant General; Joseph Matos	U.S. Marine Corps
U.S. Marine Corps Training and Education Command	Deputy Commandant for Training and Education (DC T&E) and Commanding General, U.S. Marine Corps Training and Education Command (TECOM)		Lieutenant General; Thomas B. Savage	U.S. Marine Corps
Operating forces
U.S. Marine Corps Forces Command U.S. Marine Corps Forces Northern Command Fleet Marine Force, Atlantic	Commander, U.S. Marine Corps Forces Command (MARFORCOM), Commander, U.S. Marine Corps Forces Northern Command (MARFORNORTH) and Commanding General, Fleet Marine Force, Atlantic (FMFLANT)		Lieutenant General; Calvert L. Worth Jr.	U.S. Marine Corps
II Marine Expeditionary Force	Commanding General, II Marine Expeditionary Force (II MEF)		Lieutenant General; Robert C. Fulford	U.S. Marine Corps
United States Marine Corps Forces Central Command	Commander, United States Marine Corps Forces Central Command (MARCENT)		Lieutenant General; Joseph R. Clearfield	U.S. Marine Corps
U.S. Marine Corps Forces, Pacific	Commander, U.S. Marine Corps Forces, Pacific (MARFORPAC) and Commanding General, Fleet Marine Force, Pacific (FMFPAC)		Lieutenant General; Roger B. Turner Jr.	U.S. Marine Corps
U.S. Marine Corps Forces, Japan III Marine Expeditionary Force	Commander, U.S. Marine Corps Forces, Japan (MARFORJ) and Commanding General, III Marine Expeditionary Force (III MEF)		Lieutenant General; Benjamin T. Watson	U.S. Marine Corps
I Marine Expeditionary Force	Commanding General, I Marine Expeditionary Force (I MEF)		Lieutenant General; Christian F. Wortman	U.S. Marine Corps
Marine Forces Reserve
Marine Forces Reserve U.S. Marine Corps Forces, South	Commander, Marine Forces Reserve (MARFORRES) and Commander, U.S. Marine Corps Forces, South (MARFORSOUTH)		Lieutenant General; Leonard F. Anderson IV	U.S. Marine Corps

==== United States Navy ====
Position insignia	Position	Photo	Incumbent	Service branch
Office of the Chief of Naval Operations
Office of the Chief of Naval Operations	Director of the Navy Staff (DNS/N09B)		Vice Admiral; Michael E. Boyle	U.S. Navy
Bureau of Naval Personnel	Deputy Chief of Naval Operations for Personnel, Manpower, and Training (N1) and Chief of Naval Personnel (CNP)		Vice Admiral; Jeffrey J. Czerewko	U.S. Navy
Director of Naval Intelligence	Deputy Chief of Naval Operations for Information Warfare (N2/N6) and Director of Naval Intelligence (DNI)		Vacant	U.S. Navy
Office of the Chief of Naval Operations	Deputy Chief of Naval Operations for Operations, Plans, Strategy, and Warfighting Development (N3/N5/N7)		Vice Admiral; Yvette M. Davids	U.S. Navy
Deputy Chief of Naval Operations for Fleet Readiness and Logistics	Deputy Chief of Naval Operations for Installations and Logistics (N4)		Vice Admiral; Christopher S. Gray	U.S. Navy
Deputy Chief of Naval Operations for Integration of Capabilities and Resources	Deputy Chief of Naval Operations for Integration of Capabilities and Resources (N8)		Vice Admiral; John B. Skillman	U.S. Navy
Office of the Chief of Naval Operations	Deputy Chief of Naval Operations for Warfighting Requirements and Capabilities (N6/N9)		Vice Admiral; Michael S. Wosje	U.S. Navy
Type commands
Commander, Naval Air Forces Commander, Naval Air Force, U.S. Pacific Fleet	Commander, Naval Air Forces (COMNAVAIRFOR) and Commander, Naval Air Force, U.S. Pacific Fleet (COMNAVAIRPAC)		Vice Admiral; Douglas C. Verissimo	U.S. Navy
U.S. Naval Information Forces	Commander, Naval Information Forces (NAVIFOR)		Vice Admiral; Michael J. Vernazza	U.S. Navy
Commander, Submarine Forces Commander, Submarine Force Atlantic Allied Submarine Command	Commander, Submarine Forces (COMSUBFOR), Commander, Submarine Force Atlantic (COMSUBLANT), Commander, Allied Submarine Command (ASC), Commander, Task Force 114 (CTF-114), Commander, Task Force 88 (CTF-88) and Commander, Task Force 46 (CTF-46)		Vice Admiral; Richard E. Seif Jr.	U.S. Navy
Commander, Naval Surface Forces Commander, Naval Surface Force, U.S. Pacific Fleet	Commander, Naval Surface Forces (COMNAVSURFOR) and Commander, Naval Surface Force, U.S. Pacific Fleet (COMNAVSURFPAC)		Vice Admiral; Joseph F. Cahill	U.S. Navy
Operating forces (and subordinated units)
U.S. Fleet Forces Command U.S. Naval Forces Strategic Command	Deputy Commander, U.S. Fleet Forces Command, Deputy Commander, U.S. Naval Forces Northern Command (NAVNORTH), Deputy Commander, U.S. Naval Forces Strategic Command (NAVSTRAT) and Commander, Task Force 80 (CTF-80)		Vice Admiral; John E. Gumbleton	U.S. Navy
U.S. Second Fleet Joint Force Command – Norfolk Combined Joint Operations from the Sea Center of Excellence	Commander, U.S. Second Fleet (C2F), Commander, Joint Force Command – Norfolk (JFC-NF) and Director, Combined Joint Operations from the Sea Center of Excellence (CJOS COE)		Vice Admiral; Oliver T. Lewis	U.S. Navy
U.S. Sixth Fleet U.S. Naval Forces Europe-Africa	Commander, U.S. Sixth Fleet (C6F), Commander, Task Force Six, Commander, Naval Striking and Support Forces NATO (COMSTRIKFORNATO), Deputy Commander, U.S. Naval Forces Europe-Africa (CNE-CNA) and Joint Force Maritime Component Commander Europe		Vice Admiral; Jeffrey T. Anderson	U.S. Navy
U.S. Pacific Fleet	Deputy Commander, U.S. Pacific Fleet (USPACFLT)		Vice Admiral; Jeffrey T. Jablon	U.S. Navy
U.S. Third Fleet	Commander, U.S. Third Fleet (C3F)		Vice Admiral; Marc J. Miguez	U.S. Navy
U.S. Seventh Fleet	Commander, U.S. Seventh Fleet (C7F)		Vice Admiral; Patrick J. Hannifin	U.S. Navy
U.S. Naval Forces Central Command U.S. Fifth Fleet Combined Maritime Forces	Commander, U.S. Naval Forces Central Command (NAVCENT), Commander, U.S. Fifth Fleet (C5F) and Commander, Combined Maritime Forces (CMF)		Vice Admiral; Curt A. Renshaw	U.S. Navy
Fleet Cyber Command U.S. Tenth Fleet Navy Space Command Joint Force Headquarters – Cyber (Navy)	Commander, U.S. Fleet Cyber Command (FLTCYBER), Commander, U.S. Tenth Fleet (C10F), Commander, Navy Space Command (NAVSPACECOM), and Commander, Joint Force Headquarters – Cyber (Navy) [JFHQ-C (Navy)]		Vice Admiral; Heidi K. Berg	U.S. Navy
Shore establishment
Naval Sea Systems Command	Commander, Naval Sea Systems Command (NAVSEA)		Vice Admiral; James P. Downey	U.S. Navy
Naval Air Systems Command	Commander, Naval Air Systems Command (NAVAIR)		Vice Admiral; John E. Dougherty IV	U.S. Navy
Navy Installations Command	Commander, Navy Installations Command (CNIC)		Vice Admiral; Brad J. Collins	U.S. Navy
Strategic Systems Programs	Director, Strategic Systems Programs (SSP)		Vice Admiral; Douglas L. Williams	U.S. Navy
United States Naval Academy	Superintendent of the United States Naval Academy (USNA)		Lieutenant General; Michael J. Borgschulte	U.S. Marine Corps

=== Department of the Air Force ===
Position insignia	Position	Photo	Incumbent	Service branch
Office of the Secretary
Office of the Assistant Secretary of the Air Force (Acquisition, Technology, and Logistics)	Military Deputy, Office of the Assistant Secretary of the Air Force (Acquisition, Technology, and Logistics) (SAF/AQ)		Lieutenant General; Luke C. G. Cropsey	U.S. Air Force
Inspector General of the Department of the Air Force	Inspector General of the Department of the Air Force (DAF/IG)		Lieutenant General; David B. Lyons	U.S. Air Force

==== United States Air Force ====
Position insignia	Position	Photo	Incumbent	Service branch
Air Staff	Director of Staff of the United States Air Force (AF/DS)		Lieutenant General; Andrew Gebara	U.S. Air Force
Air Staff	Deputy Chief of Staff for Manpower, Personnel and Services (A1)		Lieutenant General; Jefferson J. O'Donnell	U.S. Air Force
Deputy Chief of Staff for Intelligence (A2)	Deputy Chief of Staff for Intelligence (A2)		Lieutenant General; Max E. Pearson	U.S. Air Force
Air Staff	Deputy Chief of Staff for Operations (A3)		Lieutenant General; Case A. Cunningham	U.S. Air Force
Air Staff	Deputy Chief of Staff for Logistics, Engineering and Force Protection (A4)		Lieutenant General; Kenyon K. Bell	U.S. Air Force
Deputy Chief of Staff for Air Force Futures (A5/7)	Deputy Chief of Staff for Force Modernization (A5/7)		Lieutenant General; Christopher J. Niemi	U.S. Air Force
Air Staff	Deputy Chief of Staff for Plans and Programs (A8)		Lieutenant General; David H. Tabor	U.S. Air Force
Air Staff	Deputy Chief of Staff for Strategic Deterrence and Nuclear Integration (A10)		Lieutenant General; Brandon D. Parker	U.S. Air Force
U.S. Air Force Medical Service	Surgeon General of the United States Air Force and Space Force and Commander, Air Force Medical Command (AFMEDCOM)		Lieutenant General (Dr.); John J. DeGoes	U.S. Air Force
Air Force major commands (and subordinated units)
Air Combat Command	Deputy Commander, Air Combat Command (ACC)		Lieutenant General; Larry R. Broadwell Jr.	U.S. Air Force
First Air Force Continental U.S. NORAD Region – Air Forces Northern Continental U.S. NORAD Region	Commander, First Air Force (Air Forces Northern and Air Forces Space) (1 AF-AFNORTH & AFSPACE), Commander, Continental U.S. NORAD Region (CONR), Combined Force Air Component Commander for North American Aerospace Defense Command and Joint Force Air Component Commander for U.S. Northern Command		Lieutenant General; Bradford R. Everman	U.S. Air Force
Fifth Air Force	Commander, Fifth Air Force		Lieutenant General; Joel L. Carey	U.S. Air Force
Ninth Air Force U.S. Air Forces Central Command	Commander, Ninth Air Force (Air Forces Central) (9 AF-AFCENT) and Combined Forces Air Component Commander, U.S. Central Command		Lieutenant General; Daniel T. Lasica	U.S. Air Force
Sixteenth Air Force Air Forces Cyber Joint Force Headquarters – Cyber (Air Force)	Commander, Sixteenth Air Force (Air Forces Cyber) (16 AF-AFCYBER) and Commander, Joint Force Headquarters – Cyber (Air Force) [JFHQ-C (Air Force)]		Lieutenant General; Thomas K. Hensley	U.S. Air Force
Air Education and Training Command	Commander, Air Education and Training Command (AETC)		Lieutenant General; Clark J. Quinn	U.S. Air Force
Air University	Commander and President, Air University		Vacant	U.S. Air Force
Air Force Global Strike Command	Deputy Commander, Air Force Global Strike Command (AFGSC) and Deputy Commander, Air Forces Strategic – Air, U.S. Strategic Command		Lieutenant General; Jason R. Armagost	U.S. Air Force
Air Force Materiel Command	Commander, Air Force Materiel Command (AFMC)		Lieutenant General; Linda S. Hurry	U.S. Air Force
Air Force Life Cycle Management Center	Commander, Air Force Life Cycle Management Center (AFLCMC) and Program Executive Officer for the Rapid Sustainment Office (PEO RSO)		Lieutenant General; Jason D. Voorheis	U.S. Air Force
Air Force Sustainment Center	Commander, Air Force Sustainment Center (AFSC)		Lieutenant General; Jennifer Hammerstedt	U.S. Air Force
Air Force Reserve Command	Chief of Air Force Reserve (AF/RE) and Commander, Air Force Reserve Command (AFRC)		Lieutenant General; Paul R. Fast	U.S. Air Force
Air Force Special Operations Command	Commander, Air Force Special Operations Command (AFSOC)		Lieutenant General; Michael E. Conley	U.S. Air Force
Air Mobility Command	Commander, Air Mobility Command (AMC)		Lieutenant General; Daniel Tulley	U.S. Air Force
Pacific Air Forces	Deputy Commander, Pacific Air Forces (PACAF) and Deputy Theater Air Component Commander to the Commander, U.S. Pacific Command		Lieutenant General; David R. Iverson	U.S. Air Force
U.S. Air Forces in Europe U.S. Air Forces in Africa	Commander, U.S. Air Forces in Europe – Air Forces Africa (USAFE-AFAFRICA), Commander, Allied Air Command (AIRCOM) and Director, Joint Air Power Competence Centre (JAPCC)		Lieutenant General; Jason T. Hinds	U.S. Air Force
Direct reporting units
U.S. Air Force Academy	Superintendent of the United States Air Force Academy (USAFA)		Lieutenant General; Paul Moga	U.S. Air Force
Air National Guard
Air National Guard	Director, Air National Guard (ANG)		Vacant	U.S. Air Force

==== United States Space Force ====
Position insignia	Position	Photo	Incumbent	Service branch
Space Staff
Space Staff	Deputy Chief of Space Operations for Operations (S3/4/7/10)		Vacant	U.S. Space Force
Space Staff	Deputy Chief of Space Operations for Strategy, Plans, Programs, and Requirements (S5/8)		Lieutenant General; David N. Miller	U.S. Space Force
Field commands
Space Operations Command	Commander, U.S. Space Force Combat Forces Command (USSF-CFC)		Lieutenant General; Gregory Gagnon	U.S. Space Force
Space Systems Command	Commander, Space Systems Command (SSC)		Lieutenant General; Philip A. Garrant	U.S. Space Force
United States Space Forces – Space	Commander, U.S. Space Forces – Space (S4S) and Combined Joint Force Space Component Commander, U.S. Space Command		Lieutenant General; Dennis Bythewood	U.S. Space Force

=== Department of Homeland Security ===
==== United States Coast Guard ====
Position insignia	Position	Photo	Incumbent	Service branch
Coast Guard Headquarters
	Director of Staff, Coast Guard Headquarters (CGHQ)		Vice Admiral; Douglas M. Schofield	U.S. Coast Guard
Deputy Commandant for Operations	Deputy Commandant for Operations (DCO)		Vice Admiral; Nathan A. Moore	U.S. Coast Guard
Area commands
Coast Guard Atlantic Area	Commander, Coast Guard Atlantic Area (LANTAREA) and Director, Department of Homeland Security Joint Task Force – East (JTF-E)		Vice Admiral; Jo-Ann F. Burdian	U.S. Coast Guard
Coast Guard Pacific Area	Commander, Coast Guard Pacific Area (PACAREA) and Commander, Defense Force West		Vice Admiral; Joseph R. Buzzella	U.S. Coast Guard

=== Department of Health and Human Services ===
==== United States Public Health Service Commissioned Corps ====
Position insignia	Position	Photo	Incumbent	Service branch
Office of the Surgeon General
Surgeon General of the United States	Surgeon General of the United States (SG)		Vacant	U.S. Public Health Service

== List of pending appointments ==
Designated position insignia	Designated position	Current position	Photo	Name	Service branch	Status and date
Joint assignments
Office of the Secretary of Defense	Senior Military Assistant to the Deputy Secretary of Defense (SMA DepSecWar)	Same office		Major General; Robert J. Hutt	U.S. Space Force	Confirmed by the Senate; 10 November 2026
United States Army
XVIII Airborne Corps	Commanding General, XVIII Airborne Corps and Commanding General, Fort Bragg	Commanding General, 3rd Infantry Division and Commanding General, Fort Stewart		Major General; John W. Lubas	U.S. Army	Confirmed by the Senate; 30 July 2026
U.S. Army Europe and Africa Allied Land Command	Commanding General, U.S. Army Europe and Africa (USAREUR-AF) and Commander, Allied Land Command (LANDCOM)	Commanding General, III Armored Corps and Commanding General, Fort Hood		Lieutenant General; Kevin D. Admiral	U.S. Army	Confirmed by the Senate; 10 November 2026
III Armored Corps	Commanding General, III Armored Corps and Commanding General, Fort Hood	Deputy Commanding General, U.S. Army Europe and Africa (USAREUR-AF)		Major General; Christopher R. Norrie	U.S. Army	Confirmed by the Senate; 10 November 2026
U.S. Army Acquisition Corps	Principal Military Deputy to the Assistant Secretary of the Army (Acquisition, Logistics and Technology) and Director, U.S. Army Acquisition Corps (AAC)	Deputy Portfolio Acquisition Executive, Maneuver Air		Brigadier General; David C. Phillips	U.S. Army	Confirmed by the Senate; 10 November 2026
U.S. Army Western Hemisphere Command	Deputy Commanding General, U.S. Army Western Hemisphere Command (USAWHC)	Commanding General, U.S. Army South		Major General; Philip J. Ryan	U.S. Army	Nomination sent to the Senate; 20 July 2026
United States Navy
U.S. Fleet Forces Command U.S. Naval Forces Strategic Command	Deputy Commander, U.S. Fleet Forces Command, Deputy Commander, U.S. Naval Forces Northern Command (NAVNORTH), Deputy Commander, U.S. Naval Forces Strategic Command (NAVSTRAT) and Commander, Task Force 80 (CTF-80)	Director, Undersea Warfare Division (N97), Office of the Chief of Naval Operations		Rear Admiral; Mark D. Behning	U.S. Navy	Confirmed by the Senate; 10 November 2026
United States Air Force
Air National Guard	Director, Air National Guard (ANG)	The Adjutant General, Texas		Major General; Thomas M. Suelzer	U.S. Air Force	Placed on Senate Executive Calendar; 22 July 2026
Air University	Commander and President, Air University	Retired		Major General; Charles S. Corcoran	U.S. Air Force	Confirmed by the Senate; 10 November 2026
United States Space Force
Space Staff	Deputy Chief of Space Operations for Operations	In transit		Major General; Christopher Povak	U.S. Space Force	Confirmed by the Senate; 10 November 2026
United States Public Health Service Commissioned Corps
Surgeon General of the United States	Surgeon General of the United States (SG)	None, civilian		Officer Candidate; Nicole Saphier	U.S. Public Health Service	Placed on Senate Executive Calendar; 30 Sep 2026

== Statutory limits ==
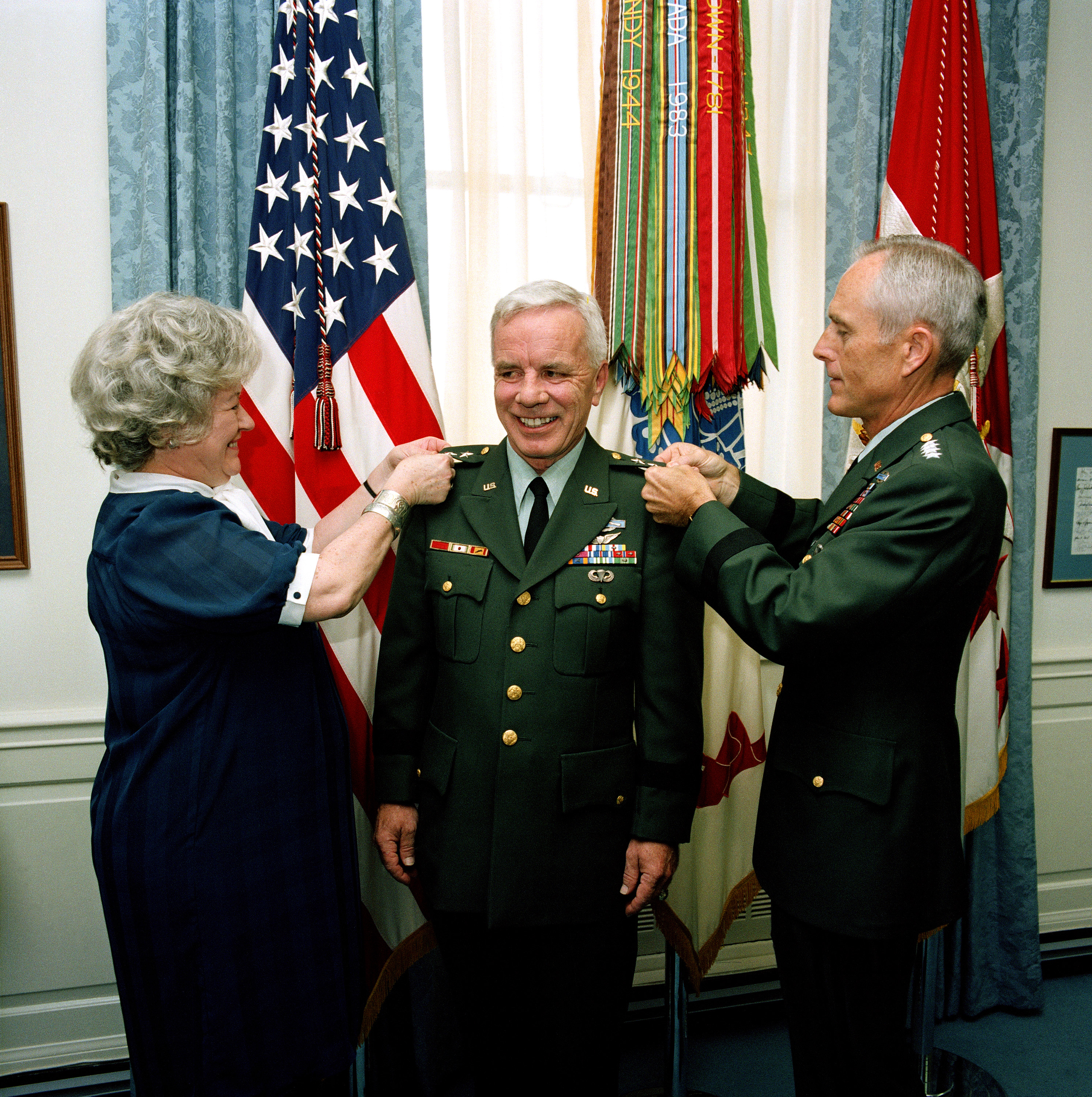
Lt. Gen. James M. Rockwell is pinned with his third star at the Pentagon on 29 June 1984.

As with four-star officers, the U.S. Code explicitly limits the number of three-star officers that may be on active duty at any given time. The total number of active-duty general or flag officers is capped at 219 for the Army, 150 for the Navy, 171 for the Air Force, 64 for the Marine Corps, and 21 for the Space Force. Statute also sets the total number of three-star officers allowed in these services, which equates to about 23% of each service's total active-duty general or flag officer pool. (Note: Dividing the total number of allotted general and flag officers with three stars (148) from the total number of general and flag officers overall (625) is 23.68%.) The number is set at 46 three-star Army generals, 17 three-star Marine Corps generals, 34 three-star Navy admirals, 44 three-star Air Force generals, seven three-star Space Force generals, and five three-star Coast Guard admirals.

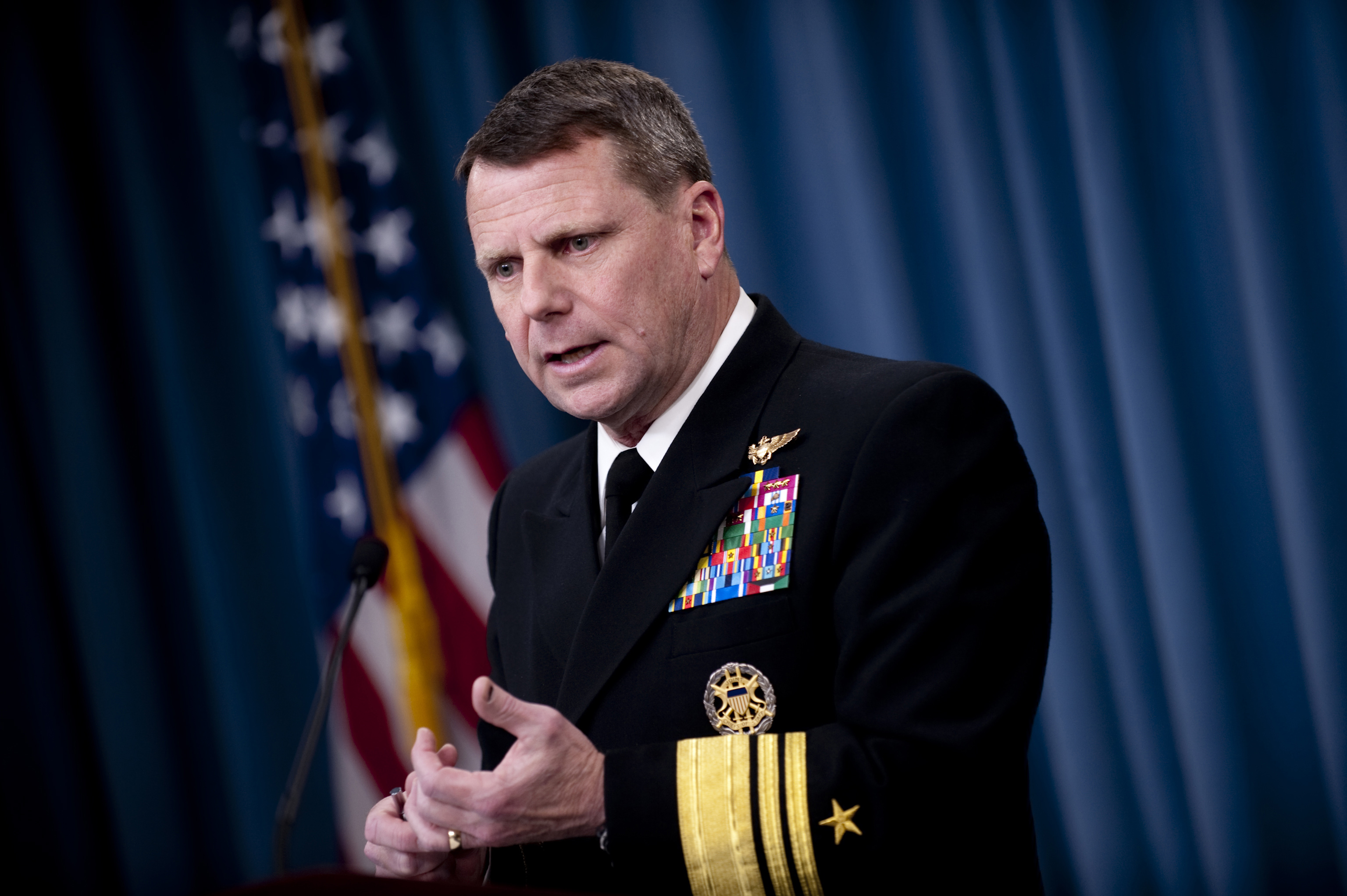
Vice Adm. William E. Gortney, director of the Joint Staff, updates the media on Operation Odyssey Dawn from the Pentagon on 24 March 2011.

While a number of these positions are set by statute, most do not have the accompanying statutory three-star rank. By convention, however:

- For the Army, lieutenant generals include corps and field army commanders, deputy and assistant chiefs of staff of the Army staff, deputies of Army four-star commands, commanders of high-level geographic or component commands, the chief of Army reserve, as well as high-level specialty positions including the inspector general and surgeon general.
- For the Navy, vice admirals include numbered fleet commanders, deputy chiefs of naval operations, deputies of Navy four-star commands, commanders of high-level geographic and component commands, and specialty positions such as the type commanders of naval air forces, naval submarine forces and naval surface forces, and the naval inspector general.
- For the Air Force, lieutenant generals include commanders of large numbered air forces or major commands, deputy and assistant chiefs of staff of the Air staff, deputies of four-star major commands, the chief of Air Force Reserve, as well as the specialty positions of the inspector general and surgeon general.
- For the Marine Corps, lieutenant generals include commanders of high-level geographic and functional Marine commands including the marine expeditionary forces, deputy commandants attached to Headquarters Marine Corps and commander of the Marine Forces Reserve.
- For the Space Force, lieutenant generals include the deputy chiefs of staff of the Space Staff and commanders of high-level field commands.
- For the Coast Guard, vice admirals include the deputy commandants for operations and mission support, as well as the operational area commanders of the Atlantic and Pacific region. By statute, there may not be more than five three-star positions in the Coast Guard and, if there are five, one must be the chief of staff of the Coast Guard.
- For the Public Health Service Commissioned Corps, the surgeon general of the United States is a three-star vice admiral by statute, equivalent in rank to the surgeon general of the Army.
- Although the rank of vice admiral exists in the National Oceanic and Atmospheric Administration Commissioned Officer Corps (NOAA Corps), its use is rare. Only three officers of the NOAA Corps or its ancestor organizations have reached the rank of vice admiral.

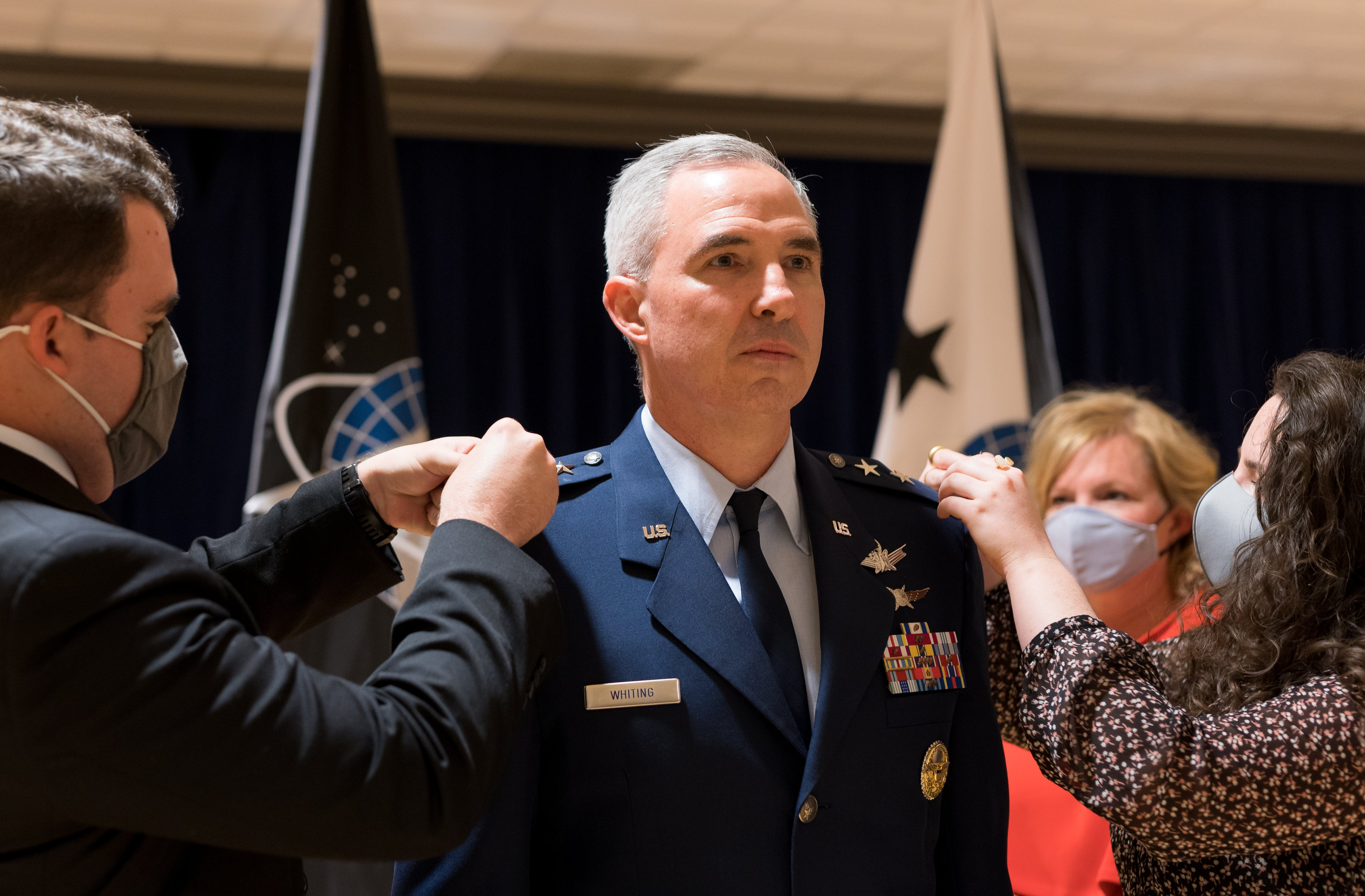
Lt. Gen. Stephen N. Whiting has his third star pinned on by his family at Peterson Air Force Base, Colorado, 21 October 2020.

The president may also designate positions of importance and responsibility to other agencies in the executive branch aside from the Coast Guard and National Oceanic and Atmospheric Administration to be held by an officer with the rank of vice admiral, with corresponding pay and allowance.

=== Exceptions ===
Exceptions exist that allow for the appointment of three-star officers beyond statutory limits. The secretary of defense can designate up to 232 officers, who do not count against any service's general or flag officer limit, to serve in several joint positions. For three-star officers, these include senior positions on the Joint Staff such as the director of the Joint Staff and deputy commanders of unified combatant commands. Officers serving in certain intelligence positions are not counted against statutory limits, including the deputy director of the Central Intelligence Agency, associate director for military affairs of the Central Intelligence Agency, and the advisor for military affairs to the director of National Intelligence. The president can appoint additional three-star officers in any one service, in excess of that service's three-star limit, as long as they are offset by reducing an equivalent number of three-stars from other services. Finally, all statutory limits may be waived at the president's discretion during time of war or national emergency.

== Appointment ==
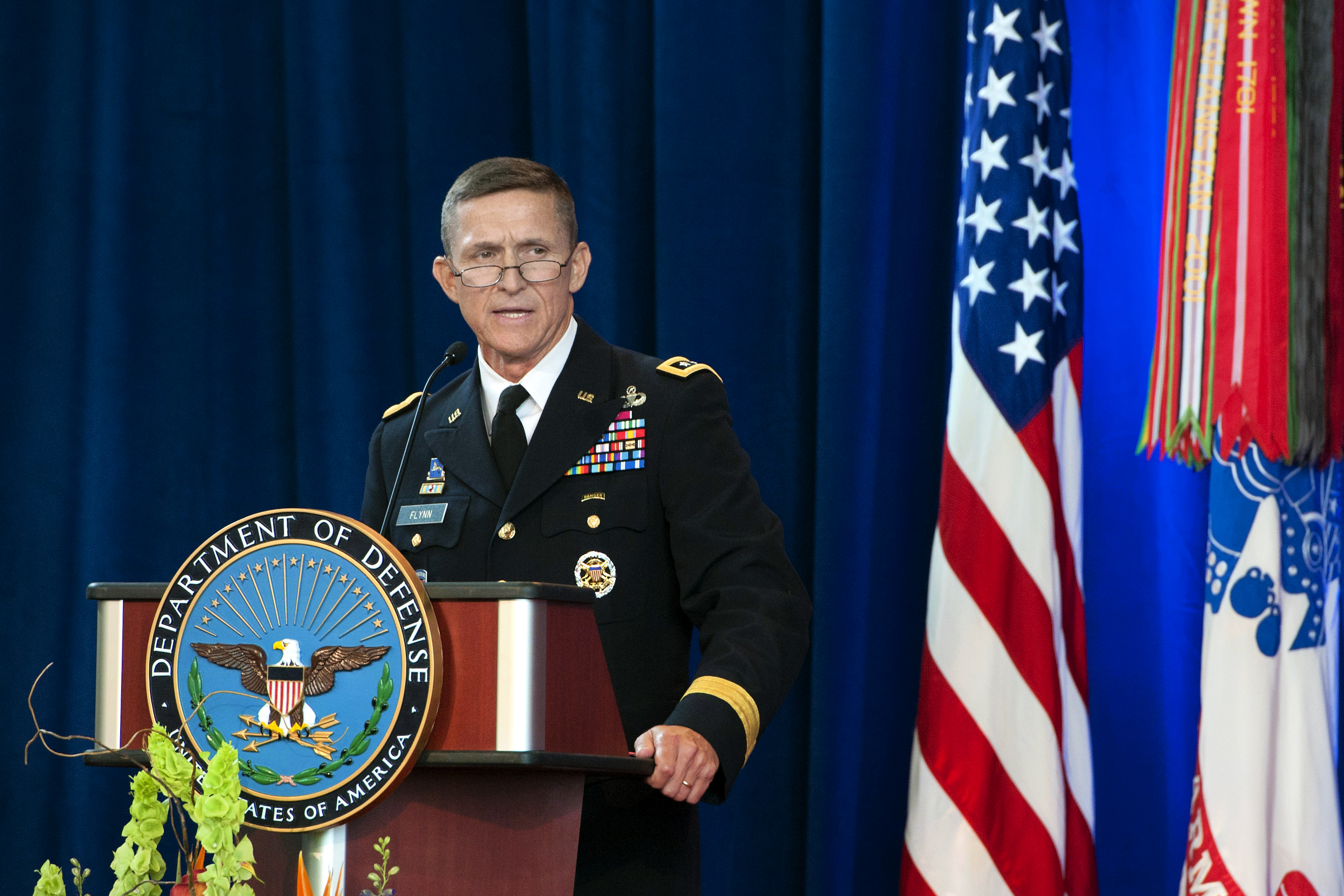
Lt. Gen. Michael T. Flynn addresses guests after becoming director of the Defense Intelligence Agency on 24 July 2012.

Like with four-stars, three-star grade of ranks are temporary in nature; officers may only achieve three stars if they are appointed to positions that require or allow the officer to hold the rank. Their rank expires with the expiration of their term of office, which is normally set by statute. The president nominates three-star officers from any eligible officers holding one-star rank and above who also meet the other requirements for the position, based on the advice of their respective executive department secretary, service secretary, and if applicable the Joint Chiefs. The nominee must be confirmed via majority by the Senate before the appointee can take office and thus assume the rank. (Note: Since passage of the Presidential Appointment Efficiency and Streamlining Act of 2011, U.S. Public Health Service Commissioned Corps officers do not require their appointments to be confirmed by the Senate. The corps' sole three-star officer, the surgeon general, requires Senate confirmation based on their office, not rank.)

While it is rare for nominations to face even token opposition in the Senate, nominations that do face opposition due to controversy surrounding the nominee in question are typically withdrawn.

- For example, the nomination of Major General Ryan F. Gonsalves to the rank of lieutenant general, and assignment as commanding general of U.S. Army Europe in 2017 was withdrawn, after an investigation was launched into the general's inappropriate comment to a female congressional staffer.

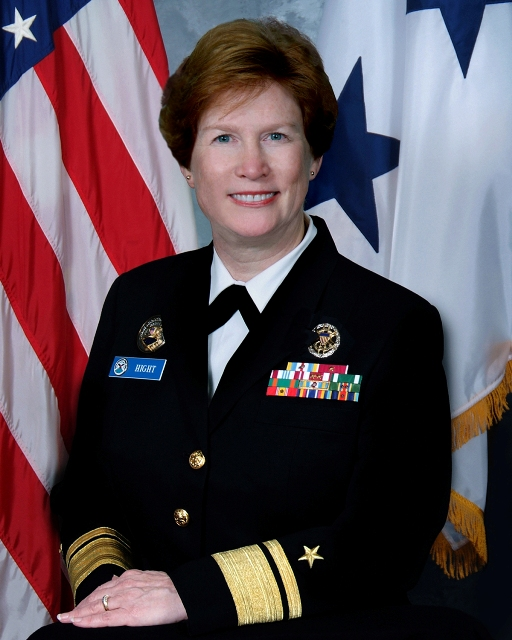
Rear Adm. Elizabeth A. Hight was not confirmed to be director of the Defense Information Systems Agency in 2008

- Rear Admiral Elizabeth L. Train was once the leading candidate to be director of naval intelligence in 2015, but her nomination was withdrawn the following year due to controversy related to the Fat Leonard corruption scandal.
- The president withdrew the nomination of Lieutenant General Susan J. Helms to become vice commander of Air Force Space Command in 2013 after eight months of inaction in the Senate, owing to concerns about her overturning the ruling in a sexual assault case under her command.
- Lieutenant General Mary A. Legere was reported as a leading candidate to succeed Lieutenant General Michael T. Flynn as director of the Defense Intelligence Agency in 2014, but her name was removed from consideration, following congressional backlash over her involvement in several controversial Army intelligence projects.
- Major General Raphael J. Hallada was withdrawn from consideration to become commanding general of Fifth Army in 1991, in connection to his decision not to prosecute two soldiers responsible for an artillery accident at his command of Fort Sill.
- Major General Joseph J. Taluto withdrew himself from consideration to become director of the Army National Guard in 2010, due to public controversy and subsequent Senate inaction over his handling of the deaths of Phillip Esposito and Louis Allen.
- And Rear Admiral Elizabeth A. Hight's nomination to be director of the Defense Information Systems Agency in 2008 was withdrawn, due to concerns about a possible conflict of interest with her husband, a retired Air Force general who was employed by a prominent defense contractor.

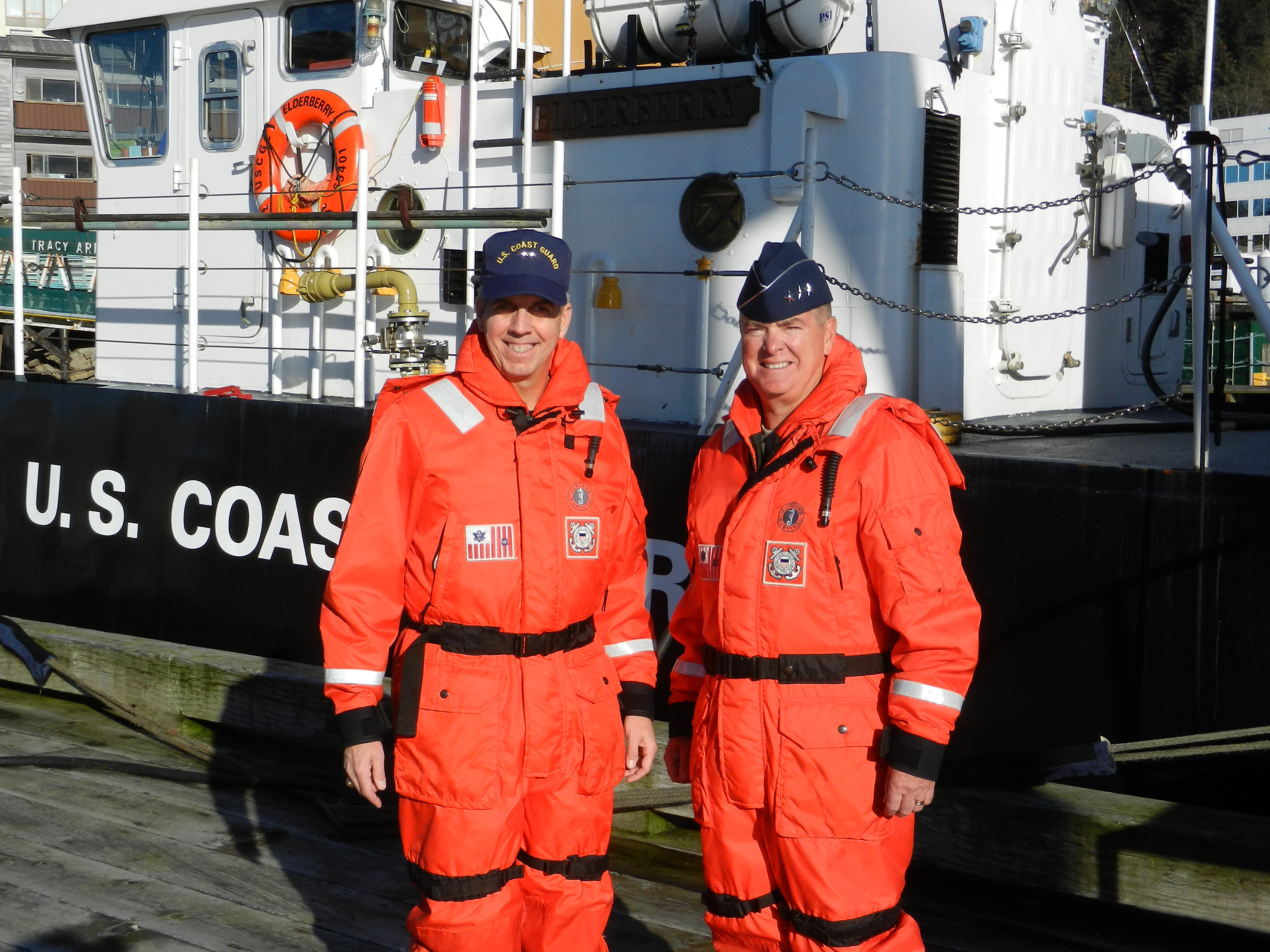
Lt. Gen. Michael Dubie (right) poses with Coast Guard Rear Adm. Daniel Abel (left) in front of USCGC Elderberry on 27 October 2014.

Nominations that are not withdrawn are allowed to expire without action at the end of the legislative session, with said nominations being returned to the president.

- For example, the Senate declined to schedule a vote for Major General Charles M. Gurganus to the rank of lieutenant general in 2013, and assigned as director of the Marine Corps staff, due to concerns of negligence leading to the September 2012 Camp Bastion raid.
- The nomination of Rear Admiral Thomas P. Ostebo to be the Coast Guard's deputy commandant for mission support in 2014 was returned to the president, as it was procedurally delayed by a senator who opposed the closure of two Coast Guard facilities in response to sequestration cuts.

Events that occur after Senate confirmation may delay or prevent a nominee from assuming office, requiring the selection and Senate consideration of a new nominee.

- For example, Major General John G. Rossi, who had been confirmed to the rank of lieutenant general, and assignment as the commanding general of the U.S. Army Space and Missile Defense Command in April 2016 committed suicide two days before he was to assume command. Lieutenant General David L. Mann, the incumbent commander who was scheduled to retire, remained in command beyond customary term limits until another nominee, Major General James H. Dickinson was confirmed by the Senate.
- Vice Admiral Scott A. Stearney assumed command of U.S. Naval Forces Central Command, Fifth Fleet, and Combined Maritime Forces in May 2018. His death in December 2018 resulted in the speedy confirmation of Rear Admiral James J. Malloy in the same month for elevation to the rank of vice admiral as his replacement.

== Command elevation and reduction ==
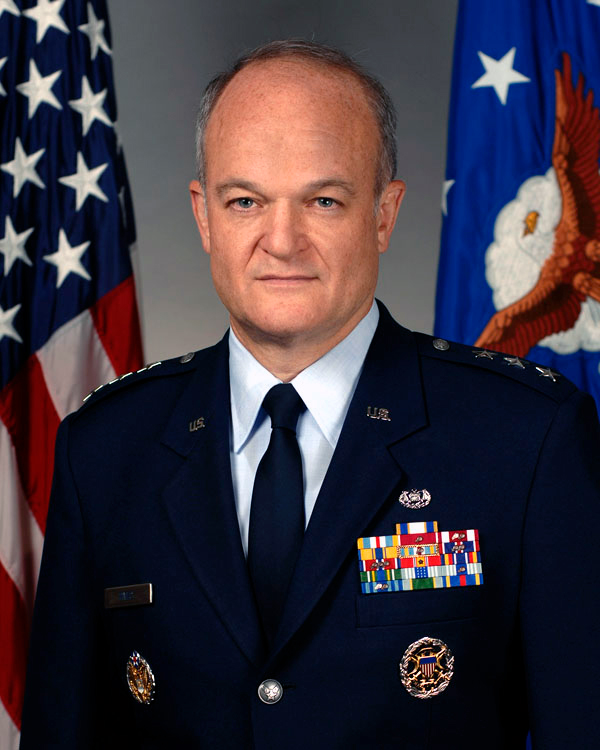
Air Force Lt. Gen. Jack L. Rives became the first three-star judge advocate general in any service, following passage of the National Defense Authorization Act for Fiscal Year 2008. (Note: The statutory three-star rank was later struck for the judge advocates general of all services, following passage of the National Defense Authorization Act for Fiscal Year 2017.)

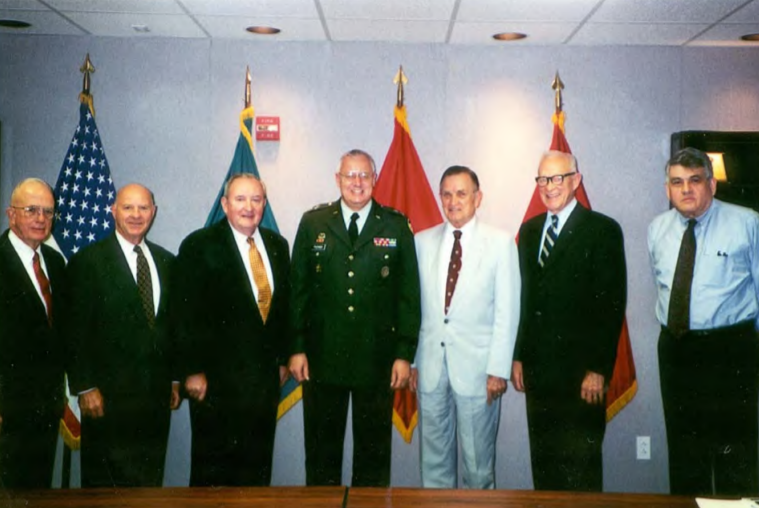
Lt. Gen. Thomas J. Plewes (center) with living former chiefs of the Army Reserve on 13 June 2001.

Any billet in the armed forces may be designated as a position of importance requiring the holder of the position to be of three-star or four-star rank. One-star and two-star billets may be elevated to three-star or four-star level as appropriate, either by act of Congress, or within statutory limits by the services at their discretion. Congress may propose such elevations or reductions to the president and Department of Defense.

An officer leading a command or office elevated to three-star rank can be promoted while in their present position, reassigned to another office of equal rank, or retire if another nominee is selected as their replacement.

- For example, Major General Scott C. Black became judge advocate general of the Army in October 2005. With the elevation of the office to three-star in 2008, Black was nominated for promotion to lieutenant general, and assumed the rank in December 2008.
- Vice Admiral Henry H. Mauz Jr., commander of U.S. Seventh Fleet, was dual-hatted as commander of U.S. Naval Forces Central Command in August 1990. The incumbent commander, Captain Robert Sutton, was not appointed to the rank of vice admiral and was thus reassigned as commander of the U.S. Naval Logistics Support Force under Mauz's command.

A lower-level billet may be elevated to three-stars, in accordance with being designated as a position of importance, to highlight importance to the defense apparatus or achieve parity with equivalent commands in the same area of responsibility or service branch.

- The National Defense Authorization Act of 2001 elevated all service reserve and National Guard components to three-star level. (Note: Special promotion authority to three-star grade for service reserve and National Guard leaders had existed since 1999 under 10 U.S.C. § 12505; the 2001 NDAA repealed this section and assigned the affected positions with statutory three-star ranks under standard promotion authority.) All affected components (the Army Reserve and Army National Guard, Navy Reserve, Air Force Reserve and Air National Guard, and Marine Forces Reserve) had their existing commanders promoted to three-star rank, (Note: Rear Admiral John B. Totushek, chief of Navy Reserve, was promoted to vice admiral in June 2001.) (Note: Major General James E. Sherrard III, chief of Air Force Reserve, was promoted to lieutenant general in May 2001.) (Note: Major General Thomas J. Plewes, chief of Army Reserve, and Major General Roger C. Schultz, Army National Guard director were promoted to lieutenant general in June 2001.) or promoted the first commander assigned after passage of the Act to three-star rank. (Note: Major General Dennis M. McCarthy was promoted to lieutenant general on 1 June 2001, one day prior to assuming command of Marine Forces Reserve on 2 June.) (Note: Lieutenant General Daniel James III became the first three-star Air National Guard director in June 2002.)
- The National Defense Authorization Act of 2012 elevated the vice chief of the National Guard Bureau to the rank of lieutenant general, achieving parity with the three-star directors of the Army National Guard and Air National Guard. Major General Joseph L. Lengyel was subsequently confirmed for promotion to lieutenant general, and assumed office on 18 August 2012.
- Headquarters Marine Corps Bulletin 5400 directed the elevation of U.S. Marine Corps Training and Education Command to three-stars and making it a direct reporting unit responsible to the commandant of the Marine Corps. Its commander, Major General William F. Mullen III, subsequently relinquished command to Lieutenant General Lewis A. Craparotta on 3 August 2020.

A four-star billet may also be reduced to three-stars, usually to compensate for another billet being elevated to four-star level and thus remain within statutory limits.

- For example, Air Education and Training Command, a four-star major command since 1975, (Note: as Air Training Command, before consolidating with the Air University) was downgraded to three-stars to compensate for the elevation of Air Force Global Strike Command to four-stars, as congressional approval was required to bypass the authorized limit of nine four-star commands. Lieutenant General Darryl Roberson relieved General Robin Rand as AETC commander on 21 July 2015.

== Tour length ==
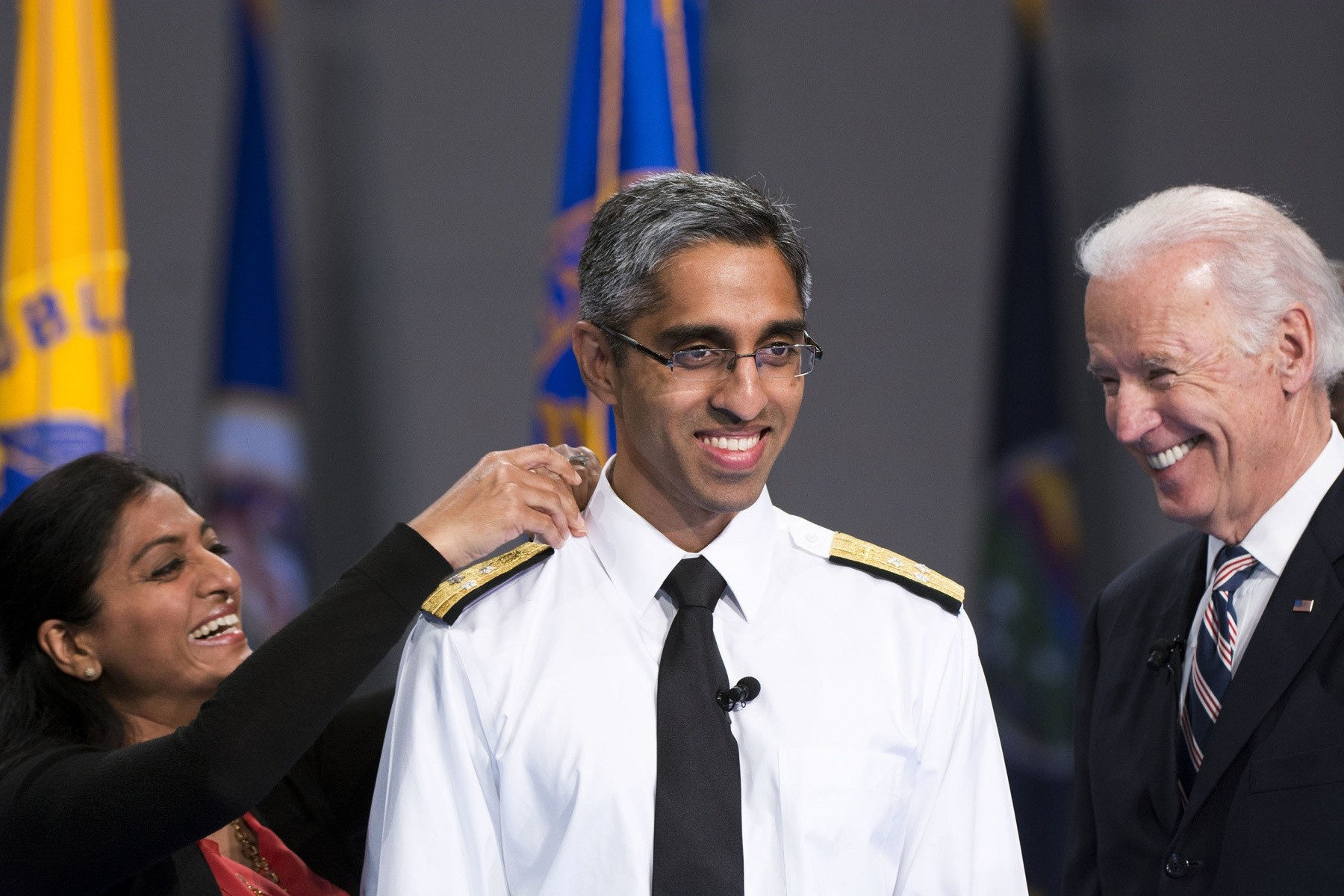
Incoming surgeon general Vivek Murthy is pinned with his vice admiral's rank insignia by his sister Rashimi as Vice President Joe Biden looks on at his swearing-in ceremony on 22 April 2015.

The standard tour length for a three-star officer is three years, specifically a two-year term with a one-year extension. Unlike with four-star ranks, many three-star positions have stipulated term lengths in the U.S. Code:

- Deputy commanders of unified combatant commands, as a joint duty assignment, serve for one to two years.
- Inspectors general of the Army, Navy, and Air Force serve for a nominal four-year term.
- Three-star chiefs of service reserve components serve for a nominal four-year term, renewable once for a total of eight years. Typically, a reserve component chief serves for two to three years.
- Three-star chiefs of Army branches, (Note: Refers to the chief of engineers and surgeon general) serve for a nominal four-year term.
- Superintendents of the U.S. Military Academy, U.S. Naval Academy, and U.S. Air Force Academy serve for a nominal three-year term, though it is common for them to serve for four to five years.
- The surgeon general of the United States serves for a nominal four-year term.

All appointees serve at the pleasure of the president. Extensions of the standard tour length can be approved, within statutory limits, by their respective service secretaries, the secretary of defense, the president, and/or Congress but these are rare, as they block other officers from being promoted. Some statutory limits of tour length under the U.S. Code can be waived in times of national emergency or war. Three-star grades may also be given by act of Congress but this is extremely rare.

- Rear Admiral John D. Bulkeley was promoted to vice admiral on the retired list in the Senate by unanimous voice vote in 1988, in recognition of his years of service to the country, including the rescue of General Douglas MacArthur from Corregidor that earned him the Medal of Honor.

== Retirement ==
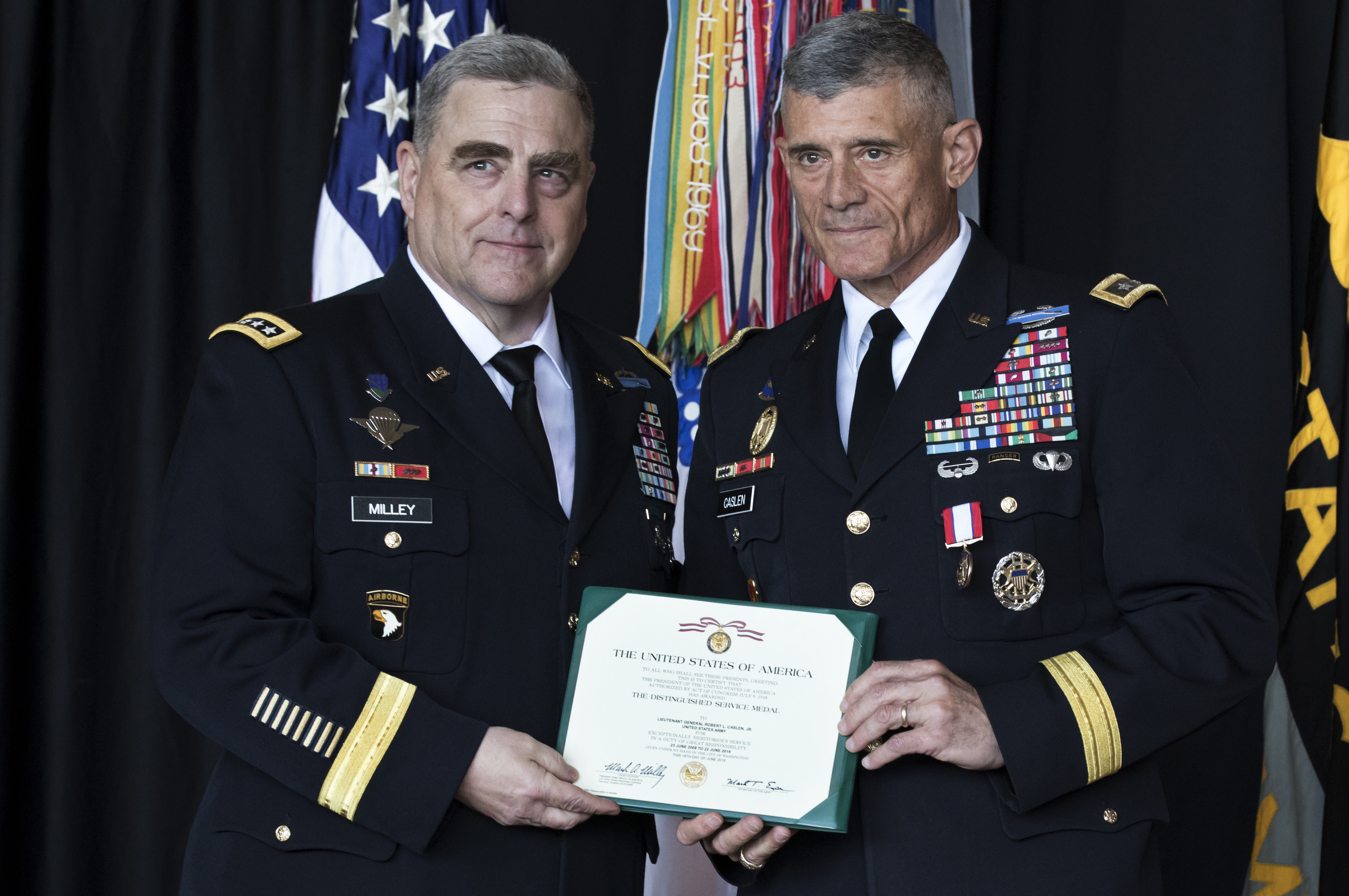
Gen. Mark A. Milley, Army chief of staff, presents retiring Lt. Gen. Robert L. Caslen, West Point superintendent, with a certificate authorizing his presentation of the Army Distinguished Service Medal on 22 June 2018.

Besides voluntary retirement, statute sets a number of mandates for retirement. Regular three-star officers may serve for a maximum of 38 years of commissioned service unless reappointed to rank to serve longer or appointed to a higher rank. Three-star officers on reserve active duty must retire after five years in rank or 38 years of commissioned service, whichever is later, unless reappointed to rank to serve longer. Three-star reserve officers of the Army and Air Force can have their retirements deferred by their service secretary until the officer's 66th birthday, which the secretary of defense may do for all active-duty officers, and the president can defer it until the officer's 68th birthday. Otherwise all general and flag officers must retire the month after their 64th birthday.

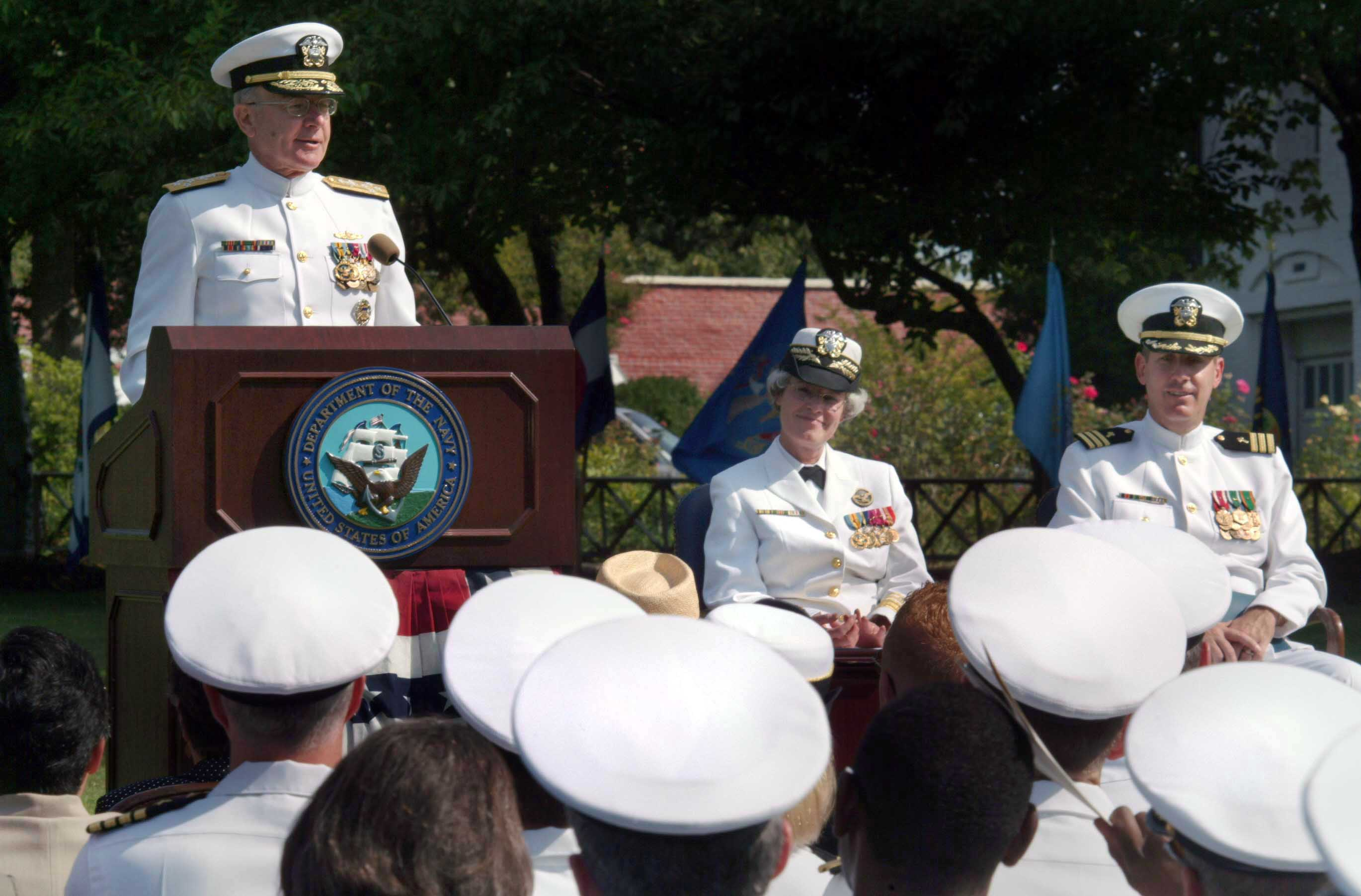
Chief of Naval Operations Adm. Vern Clark (left), delivers remarks at the retirement ceremony of Vice Adm. Patricia Tracey (center), as she listens in on 2 September 2004.

Any three-star officer assigned as superintendent of the U.S. Military Academy, U.S. Naval Academy, or U.S. Air Force Academy must retire upon completion of their assignment, unless a waiver is granted by the secretary of defense. The secretary of defense must also notify the House and Senate Armed Services committees and include a written notification of intent from the president to nominate the officer for reassignment. If a waiver is granted, the subsequent nomination and appointment of such officer is subject to Senate advice and consent, like other general and flag officer nominations.

- Such a waiver was granted for Lieutenant General Darryl A. Williams to be nominated for promotion to general to serve as the commanding general of U.S. Army Europe and Africa. Williams, who had been superintendent of the United States Military Academy since 2018, was subsequently confirmed for appointment to the four-star position, and assumed command on 28 June 2022.

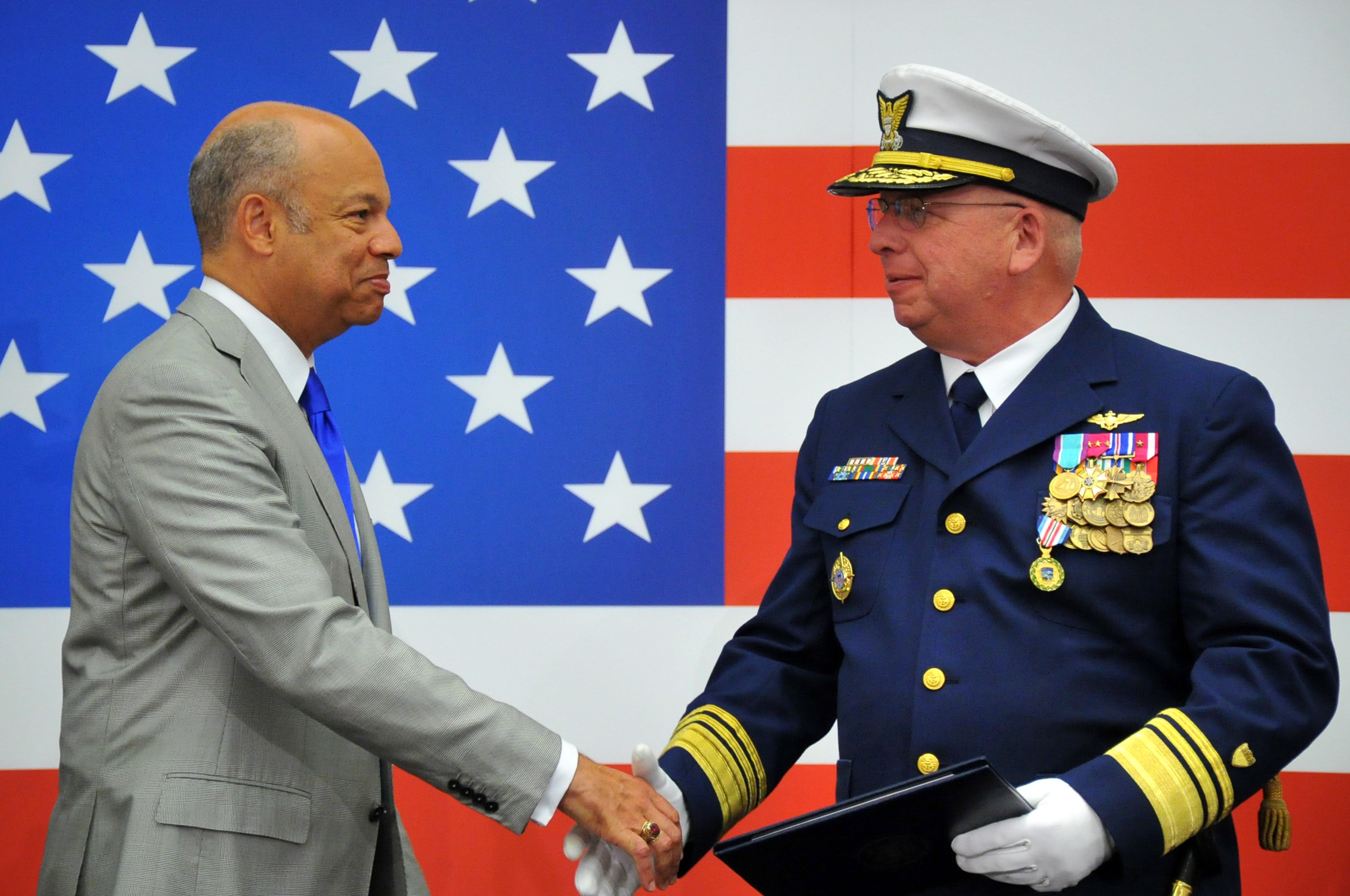
Outgoing Coast Guard vice commandant, Vice Adm. John P. Currier is thanked by Secretary of Homeland Security Jeh Johnson at his retirement ceremony on 20 May 2014.

Senior officers typically retire well in advance of the statutory age and service limits, so as not to impede the upward career mobility of their juniors. The higher number of available three-star slots overall (over 100) means that reassignment within rank is more likely for three-star officers before they either retire or are appointed to four-star rank. An officer who vacates a position bearing that rank has no more than 60 days to be appointed or reappointed to a position of equal or greater importance, including positions of four-star rank, before involuntary retirement.

- For example, Lieutenant General H. Steven Blum was appointed as deputy commander of U.S. Northern Command in 2009. The incumbent deputy commander, Lieutenant General William G. Webster Jr., was appointed as commanding general of U.S. Army Central, whose incumbent commanding general, Lieutenant General James J. Lovelace Jr., received no further appointment and retired at the age of 60, with 39 years of service and six years in rank.
- Rear Admiral Ronald A. Route was promoted to vice admiral and appointed as naval inspector general in 2004. The incumbent inspector general, Vice Admiral Albert T. Church, was appointed as director of the Navy staff, whose incumbent director, Vice Admiral Patricia A. Tracey, received no further appointment and retired at the age of 52, with 34 years of service and six years in rank.
- Major General William H. Etter was promoted to lieutenant general and appointed as commander of First Air Force in 2013. The incumbent commander, Lieutenant General Stanley E. Clarke III, was appointed as director of the Air National Guard, whose incumbent director, Lieutenant General Harry M. Wyatt III, received no further appointment and retired at the age of 63, with 42 years of service and four years in rank.
- Rear Admiral Steven D. Poulin was promoted to vice admiral and appointed as commander of the Coast Guard Atlantic Area in 2020. The incumbent commander, Vice Admiral Scott A. Buschman, was appointed as deputy commandant for operations; the incumbent deputy commandant, Vice Admiral Daniel B. Abel, received no further appointment and retired at the age of 59, with 37 years of service and two years in rank.

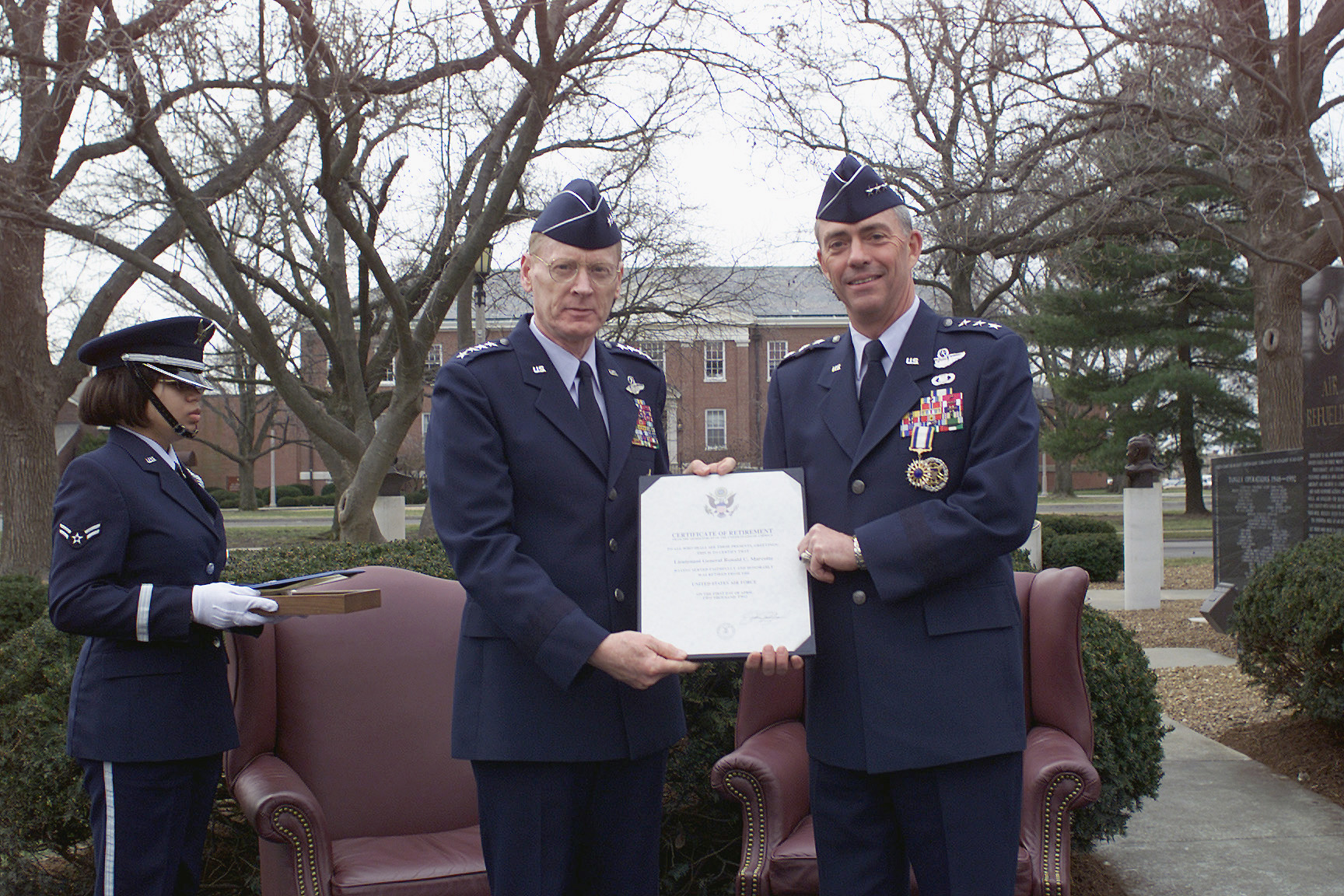
Lt. Gen. Ronald C. Marcotte (right), is presented his formal retirement certificate by Gen. John W. Handy (left), during his retirement ceremony held at Heritage Park on 8 March 2002.

A three-star officer may also be reduced to their permanent rank, and equivalent pay grade, in circumstances where reappointment to three-star rank is delayed. Historically, officers leaving three-star or four-star positions were allowed to revert to their permanent two-star ranks to mark time in lesser jobs until statutory retirement, but now such officers are expected to retire immediately to avoid obstructing the promotion flow.

- For example, Lieutenant General Timothy J. Kadavy reverted to his permanent grade of major general while awaiting confirmation as vice chief of the National Guard Bureau in 2019, as he had not been assigned to another three-star position within 60 days of his relief as director of the Army National Guard. (Note: Served as a special assistant to the chief of the National Guard Bureau from 2019 to 2020 as a major general.) After his nomination was returned to the president without action, he was certified to retire as a lieutenant general in 2020.
- Vice Admiral John Poindexter reverted to his permanent grade of rear admiral in 1986, as he was not appointed by the Senate to another three-star post within 90 days after resigning as national security advisor to the president due to controversy surrounding the Iran-Contra affair, and was reassigned to the Navy staff until retirement in 1987. His request to retire as a vice admiral was deferred by the secretary of the Navy due to expected congressional opposition.

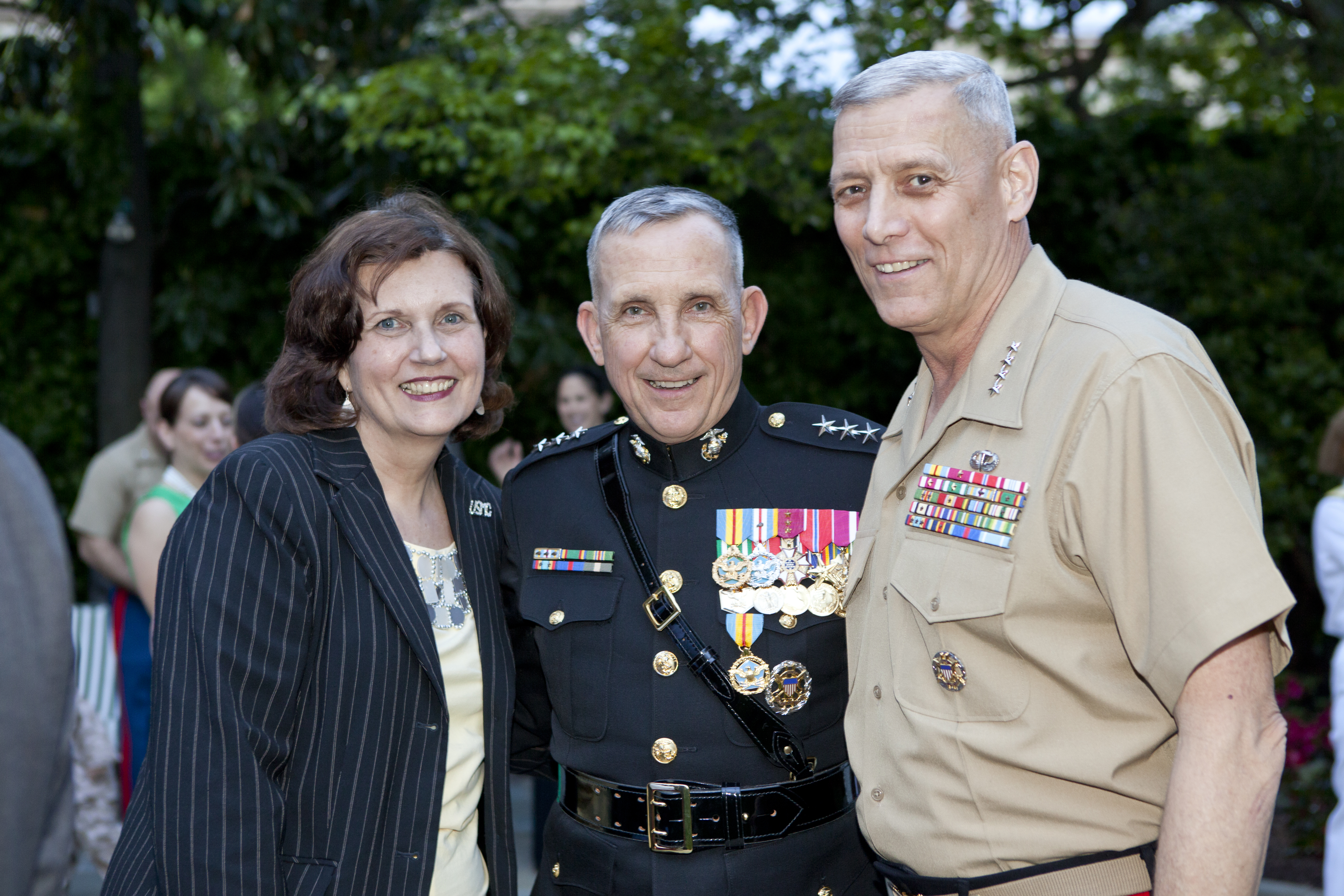
From left to right: Debbie Paxton; Lt. Gen. George J. Flynn; and the Assistant Commandant of the Marine Corps, Gen. John M. Paxton Jr., pose for a photo after Flynn's retirement ceremony, 9 May 2013.

To retire at three-star rank, or pay grade of rank, an officer must accumulate at least three years of satisfactory active-duty service in that rank, as determined by the secretary of defense. The president and Congress must also receive certification by either the under secretary of defense for personnel and readiness, the deputy under secretary of defense for personnel and readiness, or the secretary of defense that the retiree served satisfactorily in rank. The secretary of defense may reduce this requirement to two years, but only if the officer is not being investigated for misconduct. The president may also reduce these requirements even further, or waive the requirements altogether, if he so chooses. Three-star officers who do not meet the service-in-rank requirement will retire at the last permanent rank satisfactorily held for six months. The retiree may also be subject to congressional approval by the Senate before the retiree can retire in grade. It is extraordinarily rare for a three-star or four-star officer not to be certified to retire in grade or for the Senate to seek final approval.

- For example, Lieutenant General Brent Scowcroft was certified by the Senate in 1975 to retire as a lieutenant general despite holding said grade for only a year as national security advisor to the president.
- Lieutenant General Craig A. Franklin retired on 1 April 2014, with two years and two days in grade, in response to charges of partiality in overseeing cases of sexual assault in Third Air Force. Despite not being penalized for misconduct, his retirement before accumulating statutory time in grade resulted in his reduction to major general on the retired list.
- Lieutenant General Ronald F. Lewis was relieved as senior military assistant to the secretary of defense on 12 November 2015, with approximately four months in grade. He subsequently reverted to his permanent grade of major general (Note: Served as a special assistant to the vice chief of staff of the Army as a major general from 2015 to his retirement in 2016.) pending an investigation by the Department of Defense inspector general for misconduct. His certification of satisfactory service as a major general was revoked, thus reducing his retirement grade to brigadier general.

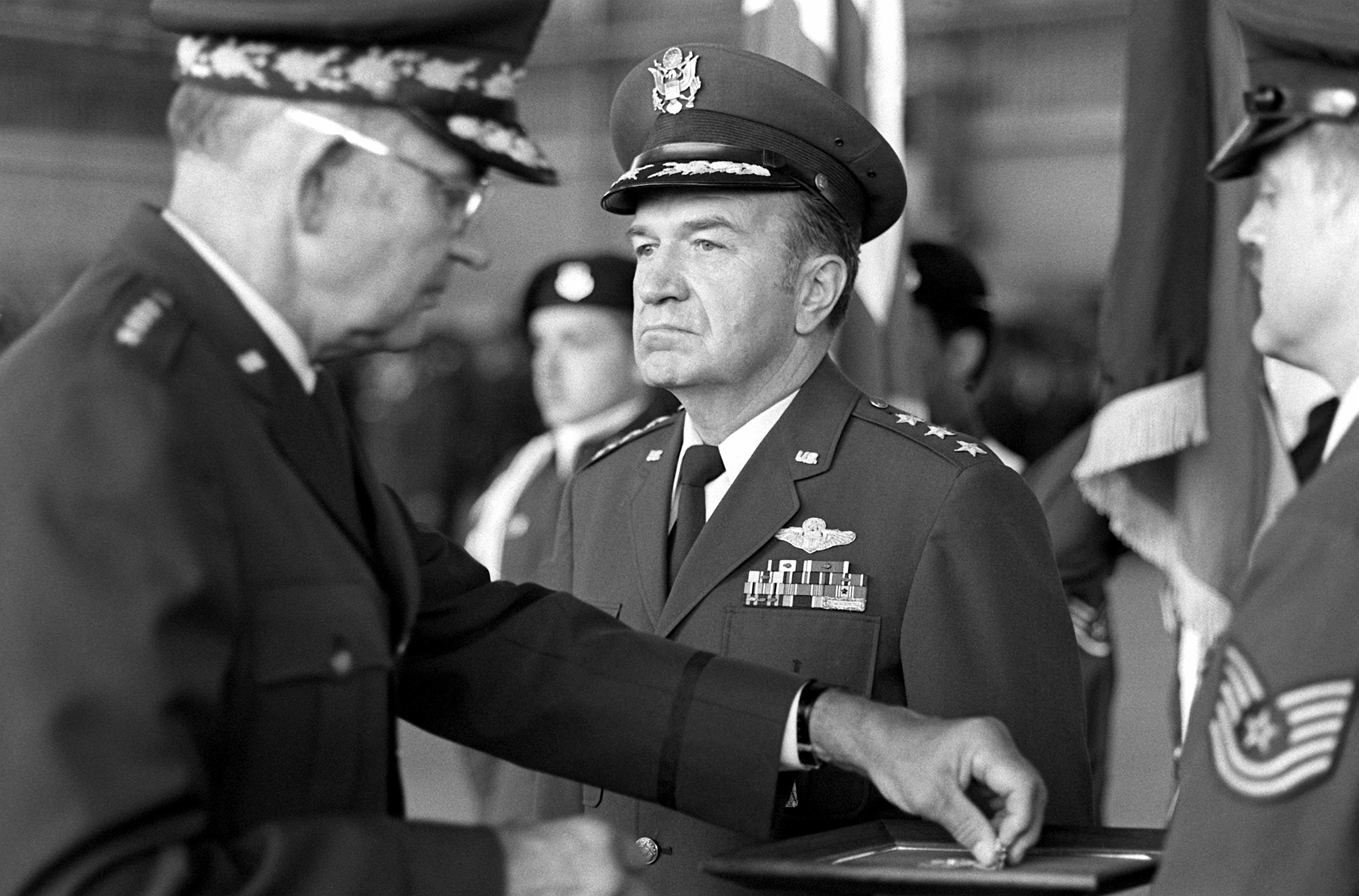
Gen. Lew Allen, Air Force chief of staff, presents the Defense Distinguished Service Medal to Lt. Gen. Benjamin N. Bellis during his retirement ceremony on 17 July 1981.

Officers who are under investigation for misconduct typically are not allowed to retire until the investigation completes, so that the secretary of defense can decide whether to certify that their performance was satisfactory enough to retire in their highest grade.

- For example, Lieutenant General Lee K. Levy II relinquished his three-star command in 2018, but remained on active duty for over a year after his retirement ceremony in his permanent grade of major general (Note: Served as a special assistant to the Air Force vice chief of staff as a major general from 2018 to his retirement in 2019.) pending an investigation by the Air Force inspector general, before being allowed to retire as a major general.
- Vice Admiral Michael H. Miller relinquished his three-star command as scheduled in 2014, but remained on active duty for almost a year in his permanent grade of rear admiral (Note: Served as a special assistant to the superintendent of the U.S. Naval Academy as a rear admiral from 2014 to his retirement in 2015.) while under investigation for the Fat Leonard corruption scandal. He was permitted to retire at three-star grade after being censured by the secretary of the Navy.

All retired officers remain subject to the Uniform Code of Military Justice and disciplinary action, including reduction in retirement grade, by the secretary of defense or the president if they are deemed to have served unsatisfactorily in grade, after their retirement.

- Lieutenant General Philip R. Kensinger Jr. retired in his three-star grade on 1 February 2006, but a subsequent investigation by the Department of Defense inspector general of the 2004 Pat Tillman friendly fire incident under his command resulted in a general officer memorandum of reprimand stating that Kensinger lied to previous investigators. The secretary of the Army waived a court-martial, but issued a letter of censure and overrode a grade review board to recommend that the secretary of defense withdraw the certification of satisfactory service issued by his predecessor, lowering Kensinger's retired grade to major general on 16 May 2008.

Officers holding a temporary three-star or four-star rank typically step down from their posts up to 60 days in advance of their official retirement dates. Officers retire on the first day of the month, so once a retirement month has been selected, the relief and retirement ceremonies are scheduled by counting backwards from that date by the number of days of accumulated leave remaining to the retiring officer. During this period, termed transition leave or terminal leave, the officer is considered to be awaiting retirement but still on active duty.

- For example, Lieutenant General Donald C. Wurster was relieved as commander of Air Force Special Operations Command on 24 June 2011, and held his retirement ceremony the same day, but remained on active duty until his official retirement date on 1 August 2011.

== See also ==
- Lieutenant general (United States)
- Vice admiral (United States)
- List of active duty United States four-star officers
- List of active duty United States Army major generals
- List of active duty United States Marine Corps major generals
- List of active duty United States rear admirals
- List of active duty United States Air Force major generals
- List of active duty United States Space Force general officers
- List of current United States National Guard major generals
- List of active duty United States senior enlisted leaders and advisors
- List of United States Army lieutenant generals since 2020
- List of United States Marine Corps lieutenant generals since 2010
- List of United States Navy vice admirals on active duty before 1960
- List of United States Navy vice admirals since 2020
- List of United States Air Force lieutenant generals since 2020
- List of United States Space Force lieutenant generals
- List of United States Coast Guard vice admirals
- List of United States Public Health Service Commissioned Corps vice admirals
