= List of United States Public Health Service Commissioned Corps vice admirals =

Flag of a U.S. Public Health Service vice admiral (surgeon general)

The rank of vice admiral (or three-star admiral), ranks above rear admiral (two-star admiral) and below admiral (full admiral, or four-star admiral) in the United States Public Health Service Commissioned Corps.

There have been 12 vice admirals in the history of the U.S. Public Health Service Commissioned Corps. Of these, nine achieved that rank while on active duty and three were promoted upon retirement in recognition of meritorious service. All 12 were directly commissioned into the regular corps, with 10 commissioned into the modern corps (direct) and two commissioned into its predecessor, the Marine Hospital Service (MHS). Eight were originally civilians who were appointed to the regular corps and to grade upon taking office, three were active duty officers appointed to grade after leaving office, and one was a civilian appointed to the regular corps at four-star rank upon initial assumption of office.

== List of admirals ==
All admirals in this list are indexed by the numerical order of their promotion to that rank, or by an asterisk (*) if they did not serve in that rank while on active duty in the U.S. Public Health Service Commissioned Corps or were promoted to four-star rank while on active duty in the U.S. Public Health Service Commissioned Corps. The listed date is their initial promotion to vice admiral, which may differ from their entry in the U.S. Public Health Service register. The year commissioned is taken to be the year the officer was directly commissioned which may precede the officer's actual date of commission by up to two years. Each entry lists the admiral's name, date of rank, active-duty position held while serving at three-star rank, (Note: Positions listed are those held by the officer when promoted to vice admiral. Dates listed are for the officer's full tenure, which may predate promotion to three-star rank or postdate retirement from active duty.) number of years of active-duty service at three-star rank (Yrs), (Note: The number of years of active-duty service at three-star rank is approximated by subtracting the year in the "Date of rank" column from the last year in the "Position" column. Time spent between active-duty three-star assignments is not counted.) year commissioned and source of commission, (Note: Sources of commission are listed in parentheses after the year of commission and include direct commission (direct) and the Marine Hospital Service (MHS).) number of years in commission when promoted to three-star rank (YC), (Note: The number of years in commission before being promoted to three-star rank is approximated by subtracting the year in the "Commission" column from the year in the "Date of rank" column.) and other biographical notes. (Note: Notes include years of birth and death; awards of the Congressional Gold Medal, Presidential Medal of Freedom, or honors of similar significance; major government appointments; university presidencies or equivalents; familial relationships with significant military officers or government officials such as U.S. Presidents, cabinet secretaries, U.S. Senators, or state governors; and unusual career events such as premature dismissal or death in office.)

List of U.S. Public Health Service Commissioned Corps vice admirals
#	Name	Photo	Date of rank	Position	Yrs	Commission	YC	Notes
1	Julius B. Richmond		13 Jul 1977	Assistant Secretary for Health/Surgeon General (ASH/SG), 1977–1981.	4	1977 (direct)	0	(1916–2008) Director, Head Start, 1965–1967.
2	C. Everett Koop		21 Jan 1982	Surgeon General (SG), 1982–1989.	7	1982 (direct)	0	(1916–2013) Deputy Assistant Secretary for Health, 1981–1982.
3	Antonia C. Novello		9 Mar 1990	Surgeon General (SG), 1990–1993.	3	1990 (direct)	0	(1944– ) Commissioner, New York State Department of Health, 1999–2006. First woman to serve as Surgeon General.
4	Joycelyn Elders		8 Sep 1993	Surgeon General (SG), 1993–1994.	1	1993 (direct)	0	(1933– ) Resigned, 1994. Director, Arkansas Department of Health, 1979–1981. First African American to be Surgeon General.
5	David Satcher		20 Jan 2001	Surgeon General (SG), 1998–2002.	1	1998 (direct)	3	(1941– ) (Note: Commissioned as admiral, Feb 1998; retired as vice admiral, 12 Feb 2002.) Assistant Secretary for Health, 1998–2001.
6	Richard H. Carmona		5 Aug 2002	Surgeon General (SG), 2002–2006.	4	2002 (direct)	0	(1949– ) Democratic nominee for U.S. Senator from Arizona, 2012.
7	Regina M. Benjamin		3 Nov 2009	Surgeon General (SG), 2009–2013.	4	2009 (direct)	0	(1956– )
8	Vivek H. Murthy		18 Dec 2014	Surgeon General (SG), 2014–2017.; Surgeon General (SG), 2021–2025.	7	2014 (direct)	0	(1977– ) Co-chair, COVID-19 Advisory Board, 2020–2021. First surgeon general of Indian descent; and first to serve two nonconsecutive terms.
9	Jerome M. Adams		5 Sep 2017	Surgeon General (SG), 2017–2021.	4	2017 (direct)	0	(1974– ) Health Commissioner of Indiana, 2014–2017.

== See also ==
- Admiral (United States)
- List of active duty United States three-star officers
- List of United States Public Health Service Commissioned Corps four-star admirals
- List of United States military leaders by rank

== Bibliography ==
- (OSG), Office of the Surgeon General (13 July 2006). "About the Office of the Surgeon General". www.surgeongeneral.gov.
- "HHS Secretaries – National Institutes of Health (NIH)". Nih.gov. Archived from the original on September 24, 2008.
- Reports of the Surgeon General from the National Library of Medicine's "Profiles in Science"
