= USCGC Elderberry =

Inland buoy tender of the United States Coast Guard

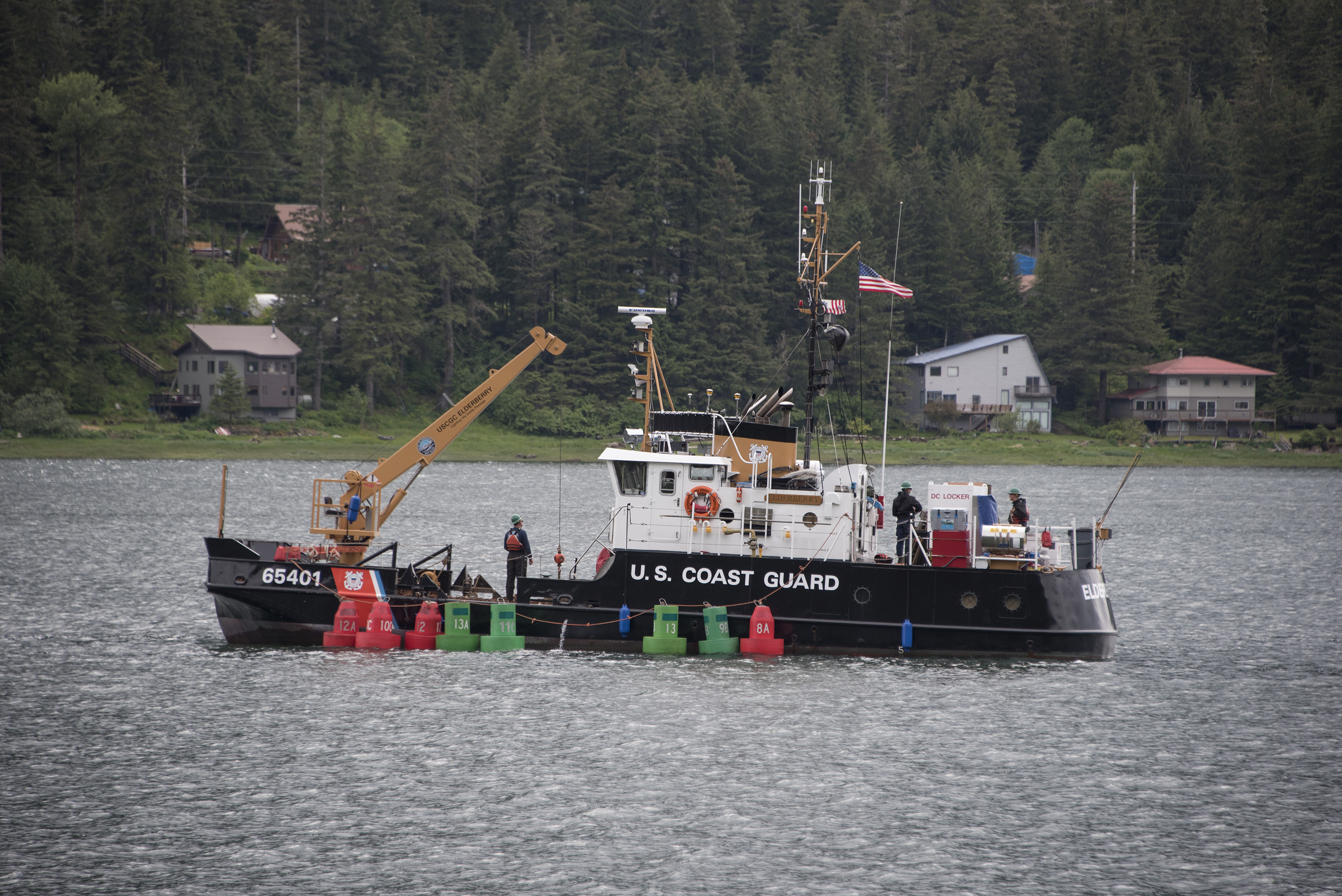
- USCGC Elderberry tending buoys in 2020

History

United States
- Name: USCGC Elderberry
- Launched: June 2, 1954
- Commissioned: June 28, 1954
- Home port: Petersburg, Alaska
- Identification: MMSI number: 366999526; Callsign: NAAT
- Status: Active in service

General characteristics
- Displacement: 71 tons
- Length: 65 ft (20 m)
- Beam: 17 ft (5.2 m)
- Draft: 5 ft (1.5 m)
- Propulsion: 2 x Detroit Diesel 8V-71 engines
- Speed: 10.5 knots
- Complement: 8 enlisted

USCGC Elderberry (WLI-65401) is an inland buoy tender of the United States Coast Guard. She is based at Petersburg, Alaska and is responsible for maintaining aids to navigation. Her efforts are focused on waterways that are especially shallow or restricted.

== Design and characteristics ==
Elderberry is one of two 65-foot inland buoy tenders operated by the Coast Guard. She was designed by naval architect H. C. Hanson, and built by Reliable Welding Works in Olympia, Washington. Her keel was laid in October 1953. She was launched on June 2, 1954, and christened by Miss Claire Dick, whose father, Captain G. W. Dick was chief of the engineering division of the 17th Coast Guard District. Elderberry was commissioned in Olympia on June 28, 1954. She and her sister ship USCGC Bayberry, which was commissioned on the same day, are the third and fourth oldest cutters in the Coast Guard's fleet.

She is 65 feet (20 m) long, with a beam of 17 feet (5.2 m), and a draft of 5 feet (1.5 m). She displaces 71 tons. Her hull is steel. There are eight bunks aboard in addition to a small galley.

Elderberry has two Detroit Diesel 8V-71 engines driving two propellers. The ship's two generators are driven by Detroit Diesel 3-71 engines. She has three fuel tanks with a total capacity of 2005 gallons. Her maximum speed is 10.5 knots. She can travel 1,500 nautical miles at five knots without refueling.

The ship's complement is eight enlisted personnel. She is captained by a senior chief petty officer.

Elderberry's namesake is the elderberry, a group of flowering plants found across North America and around the world.

== Operational history ==
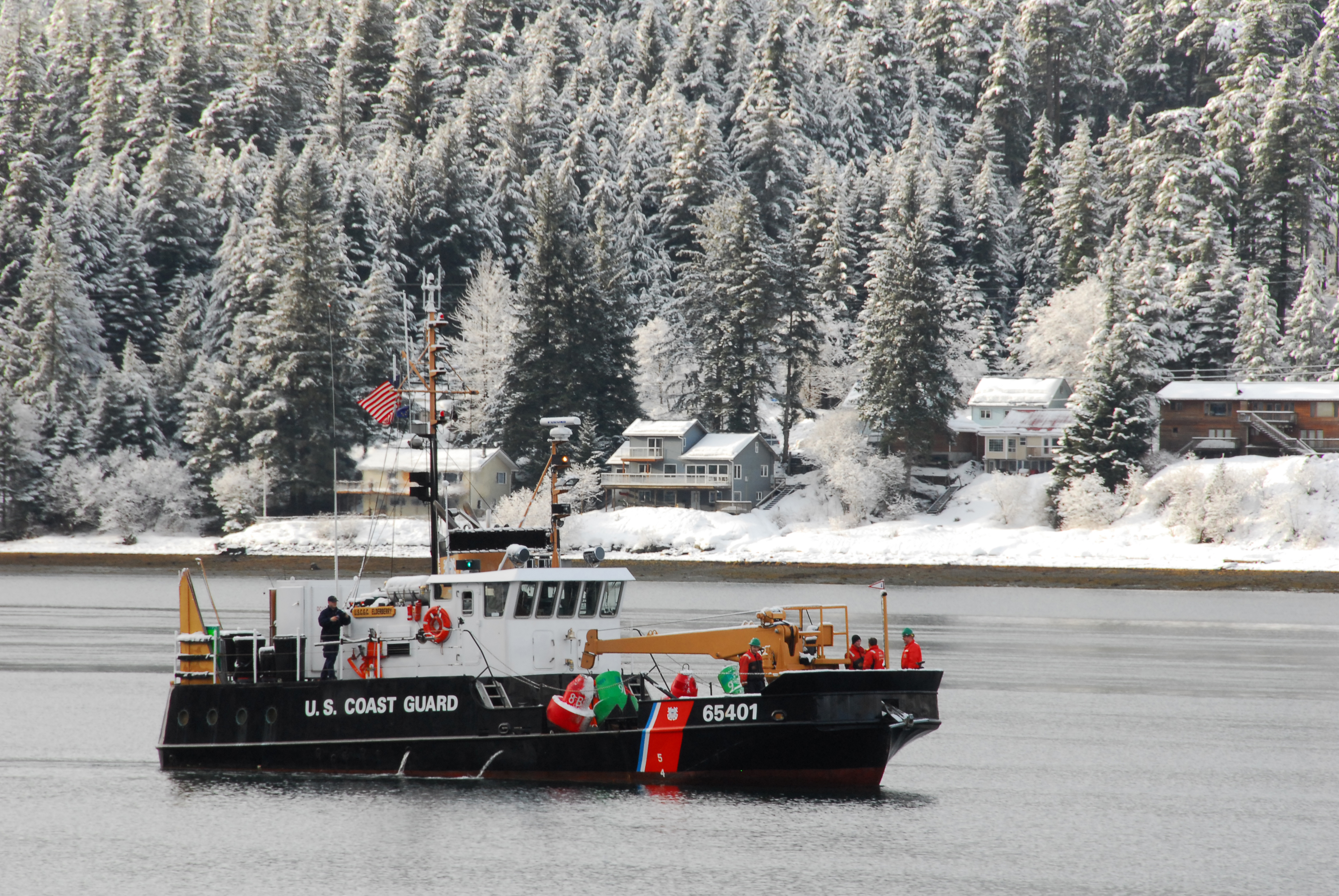
USCGC Elderberry setting buoys in Gastineau Channel

After commissioning, Elderberry was assigned to Petersburg, where she has been ever since. Her primary mission is to maintain 250 aids to navigation in Southeast Alaska, including those in Wrangell Narrows, Zimovia Strait, and Gastineau Channel. Elderberry faces a number of special challenges in this work. In tight passages such as Wrangell Narrows, towed barges and log rafts making small excursions from the shipping channel destroy buoys and other aids to navigation. In Rocky Pass, a shallow strait between Kuiu and Kupreanof Islands, Elderberry has had to work with only two feet of water under her keel. Some buoys, such as those on the Mendenhall Bar in Gastineau Channel are seasonal. They are removed in the fall, so they are not damaged by ice, and then replaced in spring.

Beyond her work on aids to navigation, Elderberry responds to search and rescue needs. From July 1, 1971, to June 30, 1972, for example, she participated in 28 search and rescue cases. Many of her search and rescue missions involve local fisherman. For instance in August 1972 she pumped out and refloated the fishing vessel Wanderlust which had gone aground on Vank Island. She has provided fuel to fishing boats that had run out of diesel.

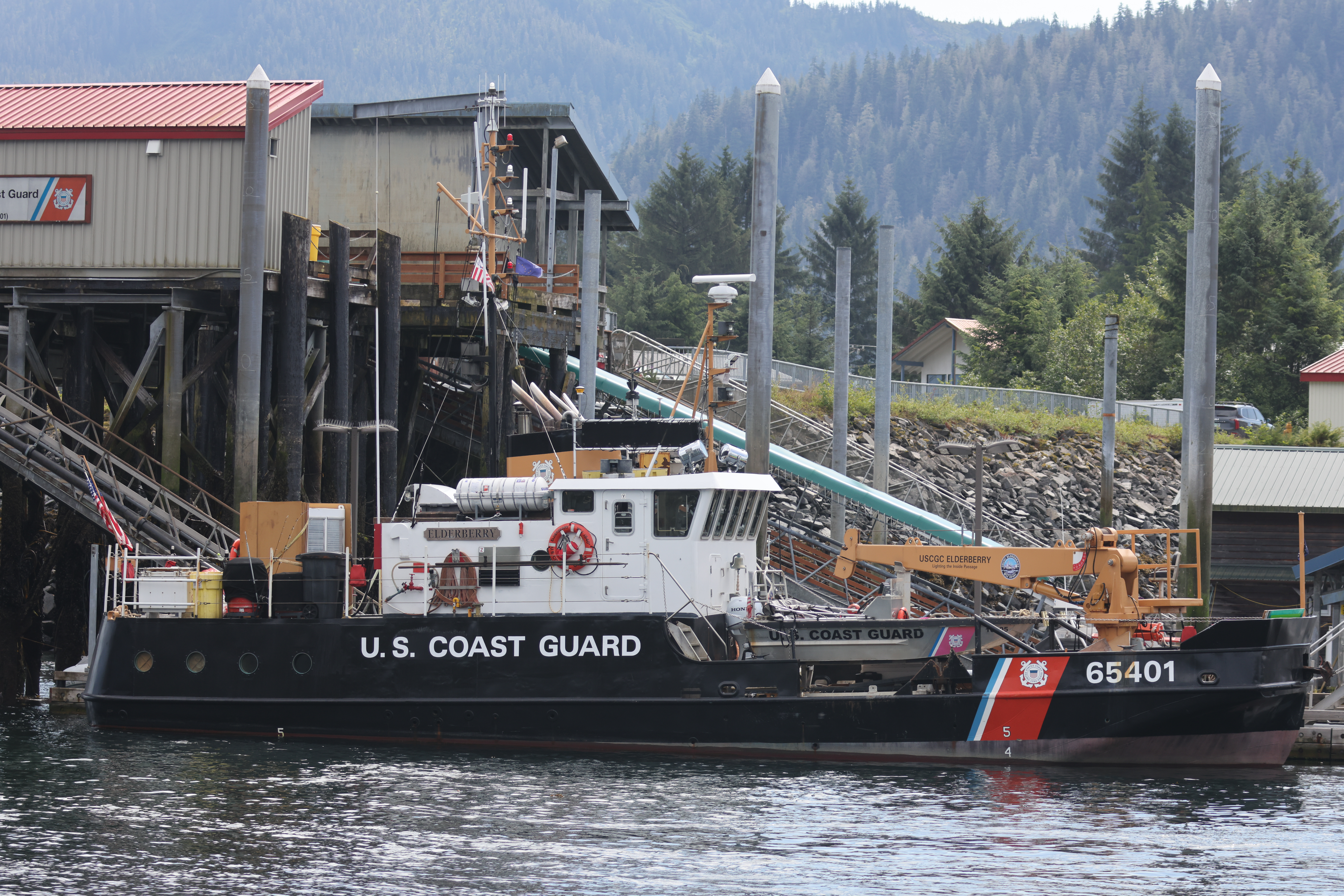
USCGC Elderberry at her dock in Petersburg

Elderberry has also participated in oil spill response missions. In April 1986 the fuel barge Annahootz went aground in Wrangell Narrows. Elderberry and USCGC Cape Hatteras responded placing about 700 feet of oil absorbent boom to contain the spill.

On February 1, 1985, the Alaska Glacier Seafoods Company cannery in Petersburg caught fire. Elderberry fought the fire from the water while simultaneously organizing the safe removal of endangered private vessels moored near the cannery. She was able to knock down the flames sufficiently to land four of her six-man crew on the dock to continue fighting the fire deeper into the building. After ninety minutes the Elderberry crew met firefighters working from the shore side of the building. Elderberry was awarded the Coast Guard Unit Commendation for this action.

== Replacement ==
In 2017 the Coast Guard began a process to replace its current fleet of inland buoy tenders, including Elderberry, known as the Waterways Commerce Cutter program. The service has issued a number of requests for information and draft specifications, but as of 2020 no contracts for new ships have been signed.
