= Elizabeth Hight =

Elizabeth A. Hight
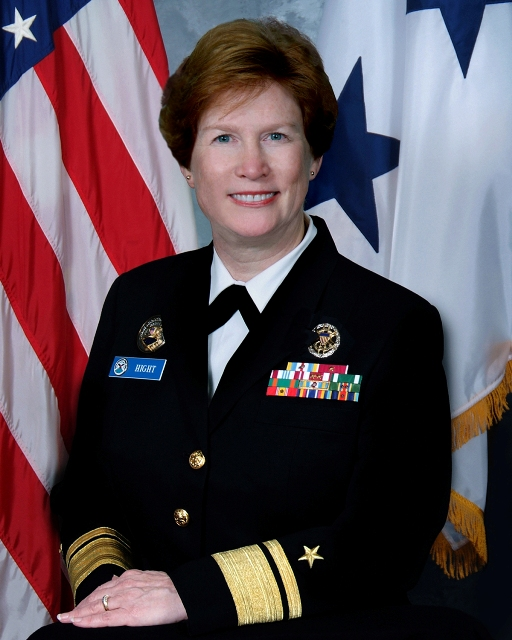
- Official portrait, 2007
- Born: 5 May 1955 (age 71); Kansas City, Missouri, United States
- Military career
- Allegiance: United States of America
- Branch: United States Navy
- Service years: 1977–2010
- Rank: Rear admiral
- Nickname: Betsy
- Unit: Vice director of the Defense Information Systems Agency (DISA)
- Commands: Naval Computer and Telecommunications Area Master Station Atlantic, Fleet Surveillance Support Command
- Awards: Defense Superior Service Medal (with Oak Leaf Cluster), Legion of Merit (with Gold Star in lieu of second award), Defense Meritorious Service Medal, Meritorious Service Medal (with Gold Star in lieu of third award), Navy Commendation Medal, Navy Achievement Medal and Air Force Master Space Badge.

Elizabeth Ann Hight is a retired United States Navy rear admiral who served as the vice director of the Defense Information Systems Agency (DISA). She assumed this post in December 2007. In 2008, she was nominated for appointment to the grade of vice admiral and assignment as director, Defense Information Systems Agency; commander, Joint Task Force – Global Network Operations; and deputy commander, U.S. Strategic Command Global Network Operations and Defense, Arlington, Virginia. Her nomination was rejected by the Senate due to a perceived conflict of interest with her husband, retired Air Force Brigadier General Gary Salisbury, who is vice president of business development and sales for Northrop Grumman Corp.'s mission systems sector, defense mission systems division. She retired from the Navy in 2010.

== Biography ==
Hight graduated magna cum laude from Huntingdon College in 1974 and joined the Navy in March 1977.

== Naval career ==
Her first duty station was Naval Communications Area Master Station Western Pacific, Guam, where she was the High-Frequency Receiver Site division officer. In 1979, she reported to Naval Air Station Pensacola, where she established the command's first human resources office, followed by two years as the base public affairs officer. In 1984, Hight reported to the CNO staff (OP-094) as the program sponsor for the Ultra High Frequency Satellite Communications Program. In July 1986, she reported to the U.S. Space Command Directorate of Plans (J5) as a plank owner, and in February 1988, she was selected to serve as a member of the USSPACECOM Commander-in-Chief's Group. In July 1989, Hight reported to director, Communications Security Material Systems as executive officer. In July 1991, she was assigned to the program executive officer for Space, Communications and Sensors (PMW-146), where she served as the assistant program manager for operations.

In May 1993, Hight reported to the Fleet Surveillance Support Command as commanding officer. In March 1995, she reported to the Bureau of Naval Personnel as the Assistant Branch Head, Fleet Support Assignments Office. Upon completion of that tour in July 1997, she transferred to the Joint Staff/J6, where she served as the chief of Current Operations Division and then as the executive assistant to the director of C4 Systems. In June 2000, Hight reported as the U.S. Space Command liaison officer to the U.S. European Command, Stuttgart, Germany. In July 2001, Hight reported for duty as commanding officer, Naval Computer and Telecommunications Area Master Station Atlantic and program manager for Mid-Atlantic Region Information Technology. In June 2002, she was selected for promotion to rear admiral (lower half) and reported to OPNAV 6/7, where she was the director of Net-Centric Warfare. From 2006 to 2007, Hight was DISA's principal director for operations and deputy commander, Joint Task Force-Global Network Operations. As principal director, she was responsible for providing command, control, communications, computer and intelligence support to the nation's warfighters. As deputy commander, JTF-GNO, Hight was responsible to United States Strategic Command (USSTRATCOM) for directing the operation and defense of the Global Information Grid (GIG). Hight was the vice director of the Defense Information Systems Agency (DISA). She helped lead a worldwide organization of more than 6,600 military and civilian personnel responsible for planning, developing, and providing interoperable, global net-centric solutions that serve the needs of the President, Secretary of Defense, Joint Chiefs of Staff, the combatant commanders, and other Department of Defense (DoD) components.

== Career At HP ==
On 11 January 2010, it was announced that Hight would take a position as the director of the new U.S. Defense Command and Control Infrastructure practice for Hewlett Packard's Enterprise Services (HPES), U.S. Public Sector. In October 2010, she became the vice president of the HPES U.S. Public Sector Cybersecurity Practice.

== Education ==
Hight is a graduate of the Defense Systems Management College, the Naval Postgraduate School with a master's degree in Telecommunications systems, and George Washington University with a master's degree in information systems.

== Awards and decorations ==
Hight's awards include the Defense Superior Service Medal (with Oak Leaf Cluster), Legion of Merit (with Gold Star in lieu of second award), Defense Meritorious Service Medal, Meritorious Service Medal (with Gold Star in lieu of third award), Navy Commendation Medal, Navy Achievement Medal and Air Force Master Space Badge.

- Defense Superior Service Medal with oak leaf cluster
- Legion of Merit (with Gold Star in lieu of second award)
- Defense Meritorious Service Medal
- Meritorious Service Medal (with Gold Star in lieu of third award)
- Navy and Marine Corps Commendation Medal
- Navy and Marine Corps Achievement Medal

== See also ==
- Defense Information Systems Agency
- Women in the United States Navy
