= Michael John Hurdzan =

American golf course architect (born 1943)

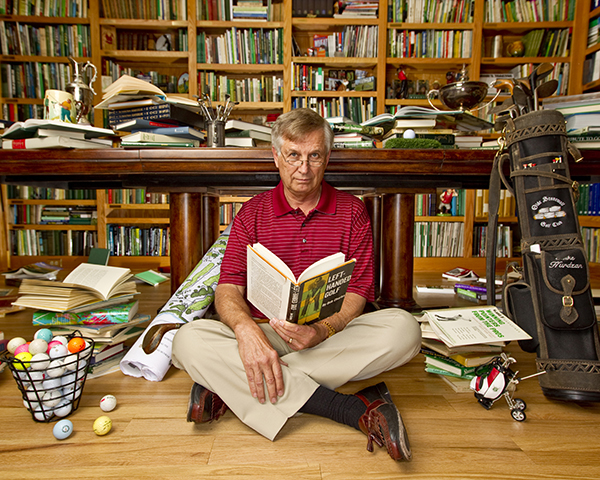
- Michael John Hurdzan in his Columbus, Ohio office in 2012
- Born: September 11, 1943 (age 83); Wheeling, West Virginia
- Education: Ohio State University, University of Vermont
- Occupation: Golf Course Architect
- Children: Christopher Hurdzan, Ph.D., MBA
- Awards: Old Tom Morris Award, 2013; Donald Ross Award, 2007; Don A. Rossi Award, 2002
- Military career
- Allegiance: United States
- Branch: United States Army
- Service years: 1966–1996
- Rank: Colonel
- Commands: 1990: 2nd POG (TAC) (Airborne); 1988: 2nd Bat., Training Group, 70th Division; 1986: 246th POC (TAC) (DS), 360th Bat., 2nd POG; 1982: SFC "C", 2nd Bat., 11th SFG (Airborne); 1973: SFOD 5, "C" Co., 2nd Bat., 11th SFG (Airborne)
- Awards: Legion of Merit; Meritorious Service Medal; Army Commendation Medal; Army Achievement Medal; National Defense Service Medal
- Website: www.HurdzanGolf.com

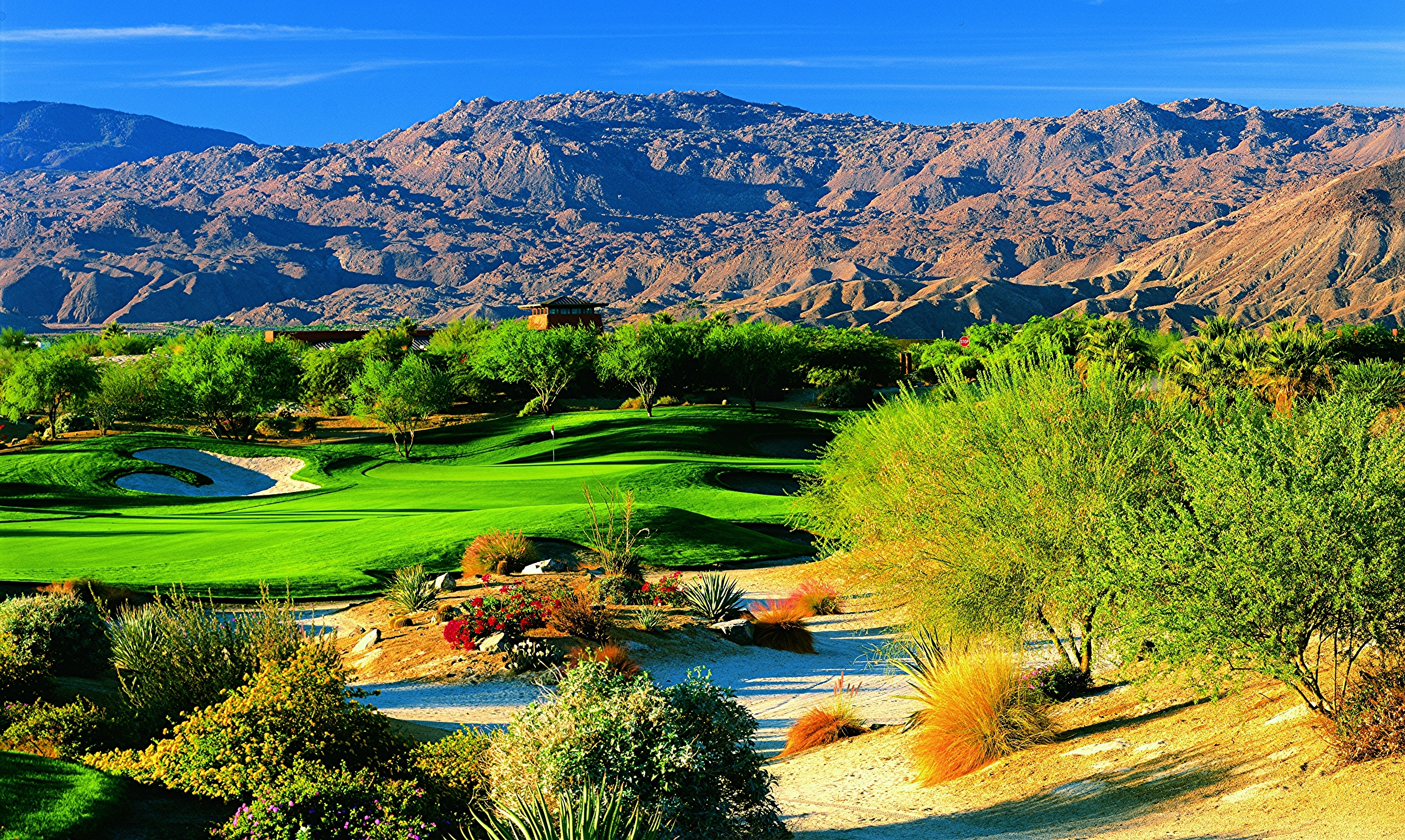
The Mountain View Course at Desert Willow Golf Resort, Palm Desert, California

Michael John Hurdzan (born September 11, 1943) is an American golf course architect, author, and a retired United States Army colonel, who served with the United States Army Special Forces (Green Berets). He is a member and past president of the American Society of Golf Course Architects (ASGCA), who is noted for designing and renovating many golf courses and clubs, including U.S. Open golf courses.

Hurdzan is a recipient of the Old Tom Morris Award, the Donald Ross Award and the Don A. Rossi Award, the "triple crown" of his profession and an honor he shares only with Jack Nicklaus, Arnold Palmer, Byron Nelson, Robert Trent Jones Sr., Rees Jones and, as of 2015, Pete Dye.

== Background ==
Hurdzan was born on September 11, 1943. He studied Turfgrass Management at the Ohio State University, earning a Bachelor of Science in 1966, and earned a master's degree in Plant and Soil Science in 1969 and a Ph.D. in Environmental Plant Physiology in 1974 at the University of Vermont. He later returned to the Ohio State University to study Landscape Architecture, and completed 3 of the 4 years program in 1978. While he was still an undergraduate at Ohio State University, Hurdzan was an Army Reserve Officers' Training Corps (ROTC) student. He later became a commander in the United States Army Special Forces (Green Berets). His unit was prepared to fight in the Vietnam War, but had their orders canceled twice. He received his Certificate of Retirement from the United States Army in 1996; he retired with the rank of a Colonel.

Hurdzan's father was a caddie who taught himself how to play golf, and tried unsuccessfully to play on the PGA Tour before becoming a golf instructor; he taught at Beacon Light Golf Course in Columbus, which was owned then by golf course architect Jack Kidwell who later became Hurdzan's influence, a past president of the ASGCA and an inductee of the Ohio Historical Society. Like his father, during his elementary school years, Hurdzan started as a caddie; he later became Kidwell's greenskeeper at the age of 13.

His son Christopher Hurdzan is his business partner at Hurdzan Golf. In his spare time, Hurdzan likes to do superkart motor racing; sometimes, he races tracks at Mid-Ohio Sports Car Course, Mazda Raceway Laguna Seca, Road America, Virginia International Raceway and has attained 147 miles per hour at Daytona International Speedway.

== Career ==
=== Military ===
Hurdzan was commissioned ROTC Second Lieutenant into the United States Army in 1966, and was serving in the Chemical Corps until 1967 when he had a break from active duty to attend graduate school at University of Vermont. On his return to active duty, Hurdzan completed the Chemical Officer Basic Course in 1972 and continued to serve with the Chemical Corps until it was disbanded in 1973. He then selects to serve with the Special Forces, and subsequently completed – within the same year, 1973 – the Reserve Component Special Forces Qualification Course, Basic Airborne Course and Infantry Officer Basic Course. He was promoted to Captain in 1974, and completed the Psychological Officer Basic Course in 1975. Hurdzan continued to serve with the United States Special Forces, and held many commands before retiring in 1996 at the rank of a Colonel.

A senior writer and equipment editor for WorldGolf.com (powered by Golf Channel), Kiel Christianson wrote that "[Hurdzan] served for 23 years as commander of Green Beret[s] and Psychological Operations units in the U.S. Army Reserve, specializing in survivalist tactics." Howard Richman wrote in the December 2012 issue of the Golf Course Management (GCM) Magazine that "Nearly 40 years ago — before Hurdzan emerged among the world’s most notable and decorated golf course architects — he traveled the globe to protect America's interests. As a commander for the U.S. Army Special Forces, also known as the Green Berets, Hurdzan prepared his unit in case it needed to be called to action in theaters of war or conflict, such as Vietnam. Part of their war games training included missions in places such as Germany". Richman also wrote that an architecture editor for Golf Digest, "[Ron] Whitten is convinced that Hurdzan, who chose not to pursue the rank of general, earned his stripes. Twice Hurdzan's orders to join the fighting in Vietnam were canceled (he was supposed to go there to spray jungles after he was schooled in chemical, biological and radiological warfare). Not seeing combat left him unfulfilled. "I wanted to be a real live warrior, a cutter and a shooter, not some technical geek," Hurdzan says. If he had fought for his country, Whitten imagines Hurdzan would have been outstanding." Richman concluded that, "convinced he has lived a charmed life, [Hurdzan is] thankful now that Vietnam wasn't in the cards for him so long ago."

=== Golf ===
As a freshman, Hurdzan tried out for the Ohio State University golf team, which then had good golfers like Tom Weiskopf and Ed Sneed in the same class with Hurdzan. According to Howard Richman in the December 2012 issue of the Golf Course Management (GCM) Magazine, Hurdzan said, "I looked around, thought, 'There's no way I'm going to beat those guys.' I said to myself that there's other ways to stay in golf."

Hurdzan's career in golf actually began at his elementary school years when he was a caddie; he later became a greenkeeper to ASGCA past president and Ohio Historical Society inductee Jack Kidwell, and was a golf course superintendent before transitioning to a golf course architect. Howard Richman wrote that Hurdzan said that the first time he saw an overhead photo with the overlay of a golf course, was the most exciting thing for him. Hurdzan was influenced by Jack Kidwell and Geoffrey Cornish; according to Richman, "[Hurdzan] believes if there were two saints on earth they had to be architects Geoff Cornish and Kidwell." He told Richman, "Jack would take me to superintendent meetings, and I knew enough to keep my mouth shut and listen. I listened to all of the old-timers' stories and learned." Hurdzan eventually became Kidwell's partner in golf course design, and subsequently owned the business.

Hurdzan/Fry Environmental Golf Design was later established in partnership with Dana Fry. The 15-year partnership produced many notable golf courses and clubs before splitting amicably in 2012. Fry went on to form Fry/Straka with a Hurdzan/Fry senior designer Jason Straka, while Hurdzan formed Hurdzan Golf with his son Christopher Hurdzan. Hurdzan and Fry agreed to continue to work "together but separately".

Environmental Golf Course Design is an integral part of Hurdzan's golf course design style, which has been appreciated by golf lovers through his design of the Widow's Walk Golf Course in Scituate, Massachusetts (opened in 1996) and the Harbor Links Golf Course in North Hempstead, New York. In Howard Richman's article Man with the plans in the Golf Course Management (GCM) Magazine of December 2012, Hurdzan explained his golf course design approach in these words: "Form follows function — you'll hear that a lot around here," Hurdzan says. "The form is something that is a direct result of the function it has to serve. That is why I work so closely with superintendents. I ask them 'How are you going to mow that?' … 'How are you going to rake that?' … 'Are you going to be able to irrigate that?' I try to get a superintendent to think ahead. I don't want to leave them with problems. I want to leave them with solutions. That's why I like to get them involved."

Hurdzan is also a golf collector with an extensive privately held collections of golf artifacts, books and memorabilia in his office at Old Henderson Road in Columbus, Ohio. His collections as at December 2012—believed to have been acquired at approximately $300,000 — is estimated to be worth $2 million.

== Affiliations ==
Hurdzan is a past president of the American Society of Golf Course Architects, and was once on its board of governors; he is a member of its Environmental Impact and Professional Development Committees. He is also a past chairman of the board of directors of Fore Hope, and still serves on its advisory board. Hurdzan is a past member of the Green Section and current member of the Architectural Archive Committees of the United States Golf Association. In 1995, at Golf and the Environment initiative of the United States Environmental Protection Agency, he was a member of the national steering committee and was on its board of directors too; he was also on the agronomy advisory poard of the PGA Tour in 1998. Hurdzan once "served on a panel for Golf Course Superintendents Association of America's professional development initiative", and was "1 of 5 Story Tellers selected [in 2012] to represent the Golf Course Industry on Capitol Hill (Washington, D.C.)".

Bradley S. Klein wrote in the Golf Magazine that "Until recently, Hurdzan was an Army Colonel (Special Forces Branch). He also manages to stay active through his memberships in the American Society of Landscape Architects, Golf Collector's Society, Donald Ross Society, Shivas Irons Society, National Stereoscopic Society, and the board of directors of the International Turfgrass Society."

Hurdzan has developed and taught some seminars for Golf Course Superintendents Association of America. He also established the Dr. Michael J. Hurdzan Endowment Fund with The Environmental Institute for Golf (a philanthropic organization of Golf Course Superintendents Association of America) for the purpose of funding environmental research on golf courses.

== Projects ==
Hurdzan is credited with being involved in the design or remodeling over 400 golf courses around the world. Some of the golf courses designed or co-designed by him are on the "Top 100" or "Best in State" lists of Golfweek, Golf Digest and Golf Magazine. Erin Hills which was selected to host the U.S. Open in 2017 is also on the Golf Digest's 2013–14 ranking of America's 100 Greatest Public Courses.

=== Designed or co-designed ===
- Erin Hills
- Westwood Plateau Golf & Country Club
- The Militia Hill Course at Philadelphia Cricket Club
- WGC Golf Course

=== Renovated or remodeled ===
- Scioto Country Club
- Ottawa Hunt and Golf Club
- London Hunt and Country Club
- Copper Hill Country Club

== Publications ==
Hurdzan is an author of many books and articles "covering from turf selection, construction technique and wetlands management to risk and liability assessment." Some of his articles have been published in the Golf Course Management (GCM) Magazine, Golf Digest, National Geographic Traveler, The Wall Street Journal and USA Today. One of his books, Golf Course Architecture: Design, Construction & Renovation, which was translated by Georg Boehm in German, has been described as "one of the definitive modern volumes on the subject."

Some of Hurdzan's published articles, booklets and books includes:

- Michael J. Hurdzan (1985). Evolution of the Modern Green. American Society of Golf Course Architects. 23 pages.
- Michael J. Hurdzan (1996). Golf Course Architecture: Design, Construction & Restoration (Illustrated ed.). John Wiley & Sons. 416 pages. ISBN 9781886947016.
- Michael J. Hurdzan; Dana Fry; Ronald E. Whitten & John Henebry (2003). Selected Golf Courses: Photos and Essays, Volume 1. With photos by Jeannine Henebry. Pressworks. 383 pages. ISBN 9780972855303.
- Michael J. Hurdzan (2004). Golf Greens: History, Design, and Construction (Illustrated ed.). John Wiley & Sons. 368 pages. ISBN 9780471459453.
- Michael J. Hurdzan (2005). Building a Practical Golf Facility: A Step-by-step Guide to Realizing a Dream. American Society of Golf Course Architects. 120 pages.
- Michael J. Hurdzan (2006). Golf Course Architecture: Evolutions in Design, Construction, and Restoration Technology (2nd (Illustrated) ed.). John Wiley & Sons. 450 pages. ISBN 9780471465317.

== Decorations ==
=== Military ===
These are Hurdzan's military awards and decorations:

- Legion of Merit
- Meritorious Service Medal with "1 O.L.C."
- Army Commendation Medal with "2 O.L.C."
- Army Achievement Medal with "2 O.L.C."
- National Defense Service Medal
- Army Service Ribbon
- Army Reserve Components Achievement Medal with "4 O.L.C."
- Special Forces Tab
- Basic Airborne
- British Parachutist Badge
- German Parachutist Badge
- Expert Infantry Badge
- Expert Marksmanship (M-16, 45, Flame Thrower)
- Reserve Component Overseas Training Ribbon with "2"

=== Golf ===
Hurdzan's golf honors and awards includes:

- Old Tom Morris Award, 2013 – GCSAA
- Donald Ross Award, 2007 – ASGCA
- Don A. Rossi Award, 2002 – GCBAA
- Hall of Fame – Ohio Golf Association
- Golf Architect of the Year, 1999, 2001 – BoardRoom Magazine
- Golf Architect of the Year, 1997 – Golf World
- Presidents Award For Environmental Leadership, 1997 – GCSAA
- Distinguished Service Award, 1994 – GCSAA

== See also ==
- Golf
- Golf club
- Country club
