= Grissom Air Reserve Base =

Military base in Indiana, USA

- Near Bunker Hill, Indiana in the United States of America
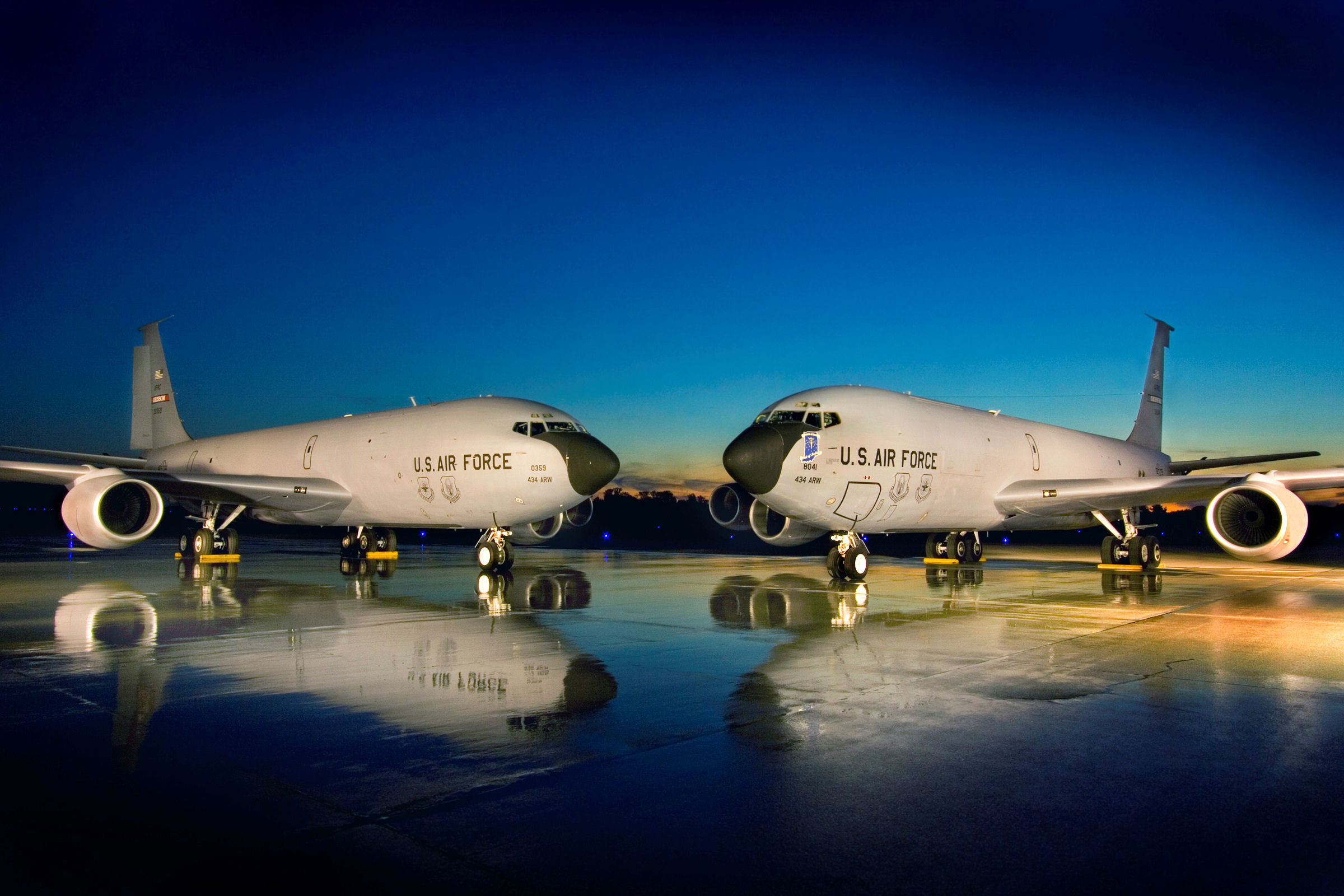
- Boeing KC-135R Stratotankers (60-0359 and 63-8041) of the 434th Air Refueling Wing.

Site information
- Type: US Air Reserve Base
- Owner: Department of Defense
- Operator: US Air Force (USAF)
- Controlled by: Air Force Reserve Command (AFRC)
- Condition: Operational
- Website: https://www.grissom.afrc.af.mil/

Location
- Location within Indiana Location within the United States Location within North America
- Coordinates: 40°38′53″N 86°09′08″W

Site history
- Built: 1942 (as Naval Reserve Air Base Peru)
- In use: 1942 – present

Garrison information
- Current commander: Colonel Thomas O. Pemberton
- Garrison: 434th Air Refueling Wing (Host)

Airfield information
- Identifiers: IATA: GUS, ICAO: KGUS, FAA LID: GUS, WMO: 725335
- Elevation: 247.1 metres (811 ft) AMSL
Runways
Direction	Length and surface
05/23	3,810.3 metres (12,501 ft) Asphalt
- Airfield shared with Grissom Aeroplex; Source: Federal Aviation Administration

Grissom Air Reserve Base is an active United States Air Force base, located about 12 miles (19 km) north of Kokomo in Cass and Miami counties in Indiana. The facility was established as a U.S. Navy installation, Naval Air Station Bunker Hill, in 1942 and was an active Air Force installation, Bunker Hill Air Force Base from 1954 to 1968, and Grissom Air Force Base from 1968 to 1994. Pursuant to a BRAC 1991 decision, the installation was downsized to an Air Force Reserve installation and renamed Grissom Air Reserve Base.

Since then it has been a joint-use civil airport/military base. Approximately 1700 acres plus the runway and taxiways comprise the current military installation, with the Grissom Aeroplex comprising the civilian aviation activities providing general aviation and charter service.

Originally named Bunker Hill Air Force Base, the base was renamed Grissom Air Force Base in 1968 in memory of astronaut and Indiana native Lieutenant Colonel Virgil I. "Gus" Grissom, USAF, who, along with fellow astronauts Lieutenant Colonel Ed White, USAF, and Lieutenant Commander Roger Chaffee, USN, perished in the Apollo 1 fire at Cape Canaveral Air Force Station Launch Complex 34 on 27 January 1967.

It is home to the largest KC-135R Stratotanker wing in the Air Force Reserve Command (AFRC), plus units from the United States Army Reserve and also the US Marine Corps Reserve. The host unit is the 434th Air Refueling Wing (434 ARW), the "Hoosier Wing", which consists of three major groups and a variety of squadrons and flights. The wing develops and maintains the operational capability of its units and trains reservists for worldwide duty, with the wing operationally-gained by the Air Mobility Command (AMC). Training consists of flight operations, deployments, and weekday and weekend training.

Other organizations located at Grissom ARB include the U.S. Army Reserve's Company A, 1st Battalion, 330th Regiment; 316th Psychological Operations Company (Tactical); Detachment 1, 855th Quartermaster Company; the U.S. Marine Corps Reserve's Marine Corps Reserve Center Grissom and Detachment 1, Communications Company, 4th Marine Logistics Group.

== History ==
=== Background ===
On 18 March 1942, the Bureau of Yards and Docks (BuDocks) sent out a letter to the Judge Advocate General of the Navy (JAG), Rear Admiral Walter Browne Woodson, for the acquisition of land near Peru, Indiana, with the intention of constructing a Naval Reserve Aviation Base. The following day, the Shore Station Development Board sent a letter of recommendation to the US Secretary of the Navy (SECNAV), Frank Knox, estimating the cost of the project, including land acquisition, at $7,000,000. On 21 March 1942, the Chief of Naval Operations, Fleet Admiral Ernest King, concurred with BuDocks and also sent a letter to SECNAV. Secretary Knox sent a letter the same day to JAG Woodson approving the base.

On 27 March 1942, Russell B. Moore Company, Indianapolis, Indiana, signed contract NOy-5485, for the architectural and engineering services for Naval Reserve Aviation Base at Peru, Indiana. Two other firms had been considered; Walter W. Ahlschlager & Associates, Chicago, Illinois, and Phelps & Peck, Michigan City, Indiana.

On 3 April 1942, contract NOy-5475, for the construction of a Naval Reserve Aviation Base at Peru, Indiana, with Captain R.D. Spalding, USN, the Officer-in-Charge, was sent out. The contract included Projects 1 to 47, with a fee of $4,965,500. Changes "A" through "M", were added over the next several months, adding Projects 48 to 77, and 501, and on 19 November 1942, Purchase Order 4057 authorized Projects 78 to 87, with manual instruction authorizing Project 88.

Four contractors were considered for the project; James T. Barnes Construction Company, Logansport, Indiana; Sollitt Construction Company, Inc., South Bend; William P Jungclaus Company, Indianapolis; and a joint venture between J.L. Simmons Company, Inc., Indianapolis, and United Construction Company, Winona, Minnesota. The bid was given to J.L. Simmons Company, Inc. and United Construction Company, and signed on 16 April 1942.

Project No.	Name of project	Project No.	Name of project	Project No.	Name of project	Project No.	Name of project
1	Development of Landing Field	24	Armory	47	Bachelor Officers' Quarters (with messing facilities)	70*	Outlying Field No. 21; Clearing, Grading, Drainage, Sodding and relocating of fences.
2	Runways (4), 200 ft × 5,000 ft (61 m × 1,524 m) Bituminous Surface, and Landing Mat (2,500 ft (760 m) (Under Project 67 the runways were later changed to concrete).	25	Athletic Field (Later cancelled by Change "B")	48	Link Trainer Building	71*	Outlying Field No. 22; Clearing, Grading, Drainage, Sodding and relocating of fences.
3	Landing Field Lighting (Runway Contract and Obstruction Lighting). (77% complete under this contract, balance cancelled by Change "M").	26	Drill Field (paved)	49	Officers' Quarters (2) Commanding Officer and Executive Officer (Later cancelled by Change "M"	72*	Outlying Field No. 23; Clearing, Grading, Drainage, Sodding and relocating of fences.
4	Barracks (enlisted men, 1800)	27	Rifle and Machine Gun Range (Later cancelled by Change "M")	50	Building to house Engine Test Stands (Six Test Stands and Three Control Rooms)	73*	Outlying Field No. 20; Clearing, Grading, Drainage, Sodding and relocating of fences.
5	Barracks (students, 800)	28	Magazine (Small Arms and Pyrotechnics)	51	Increase of Dispensary to 109 bed capacity	74	Public Works Building (Later cancelled by BuDocks Directive of 29 March 1943)
6	Mess Hall (1000 Men)	29	Gasoline Storage and Distribution (200,000 US gal (760,000 L; 170,000 imp gal)) and Truck Loading Stand.	52	Outlying Field No. 1; Clearing, Grading, Drainage, Sodding	75	Purchase of 2 Refrigerators for Commanding Officers' and Executive Officers' Quarters
7	Subsistence Building (800 students, 400 sitting)	30	Fuel Oil Storage	53	Outlying Field No. 2; Clearing, Grading, Drainage, Sodding	76	Construction of 4 in (100 mm) Water Well (Later cancelled by BuDocks Directive of 29 March 1943)
8	Bachelor Officers' Quarters (without messing facilities) (4) 160 officers.	31	Electrical Distribution System	54	Outlying Field No. 3; Clearing, Grading, Drainage, Sodding	77	Outlying Field No. 3; Rock Stabilization of subgrade for Landing Mat (2nd increment to Project 54)
9	Auditorium and Recreation Building	32	Water and Fire Protection Systems	55	Outlying Field No. 4; Clearing, Grading, Drainage, Sodding	78†	Outlying Field No. 8; Rock Stabilization of subgrade for Landing Mat (2nd increment to Project 58)
10	Dispensary (25 beds) (Capacity increased to 109 beds under Project 51).	33	Inter-communication and Fire-crash Alarm Systems (Later cancelled)	56	Outlying Field No. 7; Clearing, Grading, Drainage, Sodding (76% accomplished under this contract; balance cancelled by Change "M").	79†	Outlying Field No. 2; 2nd increment to Project 53
11	Instruction Buildings (2)	34	Warming-up Platforms	57	Outlying Field No. 10; Clearing, Grading, Drainage, Sodding	80†	Outlying Field No. 4; 2nd increment to Project 55
12	Administration Building	35	Roads, Walks and Services	58	Outlying Field No. 8; Clearing, Grading, Drainage, Sodding	81†	Outlying Field No. 7; 2nd increment to Project 56
13	Squadron Administration Buildings (2)	36	Sewerage System and Sewage Disposal	59	Outlying Field No. 12; Clearing, Grading, Drainage, Sodding	82†	Outlying Field No. 8; 2nd increment to Project 58
14	Operations Building	37	Steam Distribution System	60	Outlying Field No. 6; Clearing, Grading, Drainage, Sodding	83†	Outlying Field No. 12; 2nd increment to Project 59
15	Temporary Hangars (2) (240 ft × 160 ft (73 m × 49 m))	38	Drainage System (Storm Water)	61	Outlying Field No. 11; Clearing, Grading, Drainage, Sodding	84†	Outlying Field No. 6; 2nd increment to Project 60
16	Assembly and Repair Ship (120 ft × 160 ft (37 m × 49 m))	39	Standby Emergency Electrical Unit (50 KW)	62	Outlying Field No. 14; Clearing, Grading, Drainage, Sodding (12% accomplished under this contract; balance cancelled by Change "M").	85†	Outlying Field No. 11; 2nd increment to Project 61
17	Paint and Dope Spray Booth	40	Engine Run-in Stands	63	Collateral Medical and Surgical Equipment for Dispensary	86†	Outlying Field No. 14; 2nd increment to Project 62
18	Garage, Station Maintenance Building and Firehouse	41	Parachute Building with Tower	64	Collateral Diet Kitchen Equipment for Dispensary	87†	Outlying Field No. 9; 2nd increment to Project 66
19	Heating Plant (Operations area)	42	Railroad Spur	65	Dispensary X-Ray and Viewing Equipment	88	Auditing Adjustment of Surplus Material, Equipment and Supplies Account
20	Storehouses with Platform (2) (50 ft × 153 ft (15 m × 47 m))	43	Swimming Pool (Later cancelled by Change "M")	66	Outlying Field No. 9; Clearing, Grading, Drainage, Sodding (Later cancelled by Change "M").	501	Material purchased and shipped to Aircraft Delivery Unit, Port Columbus, Ohio
21	Storage Building, General and Aircraft, (temporary) (25,000 sq ft (2,300 m^{2}))	44	Brig (Later changed to Reception Center)	67	Changing 4 Rnways to Concrete, and Landing Mat (2nd increment to Project 2)	*Note	(Projects 69 to 73, inclusive, were later cancelled by Change "M")
22	Paint, Oil and Dope Storage Building	45	Miscellaneous Fixed Equipment (1.2% accomplished under this contract; balance cancelled by Change "M".)	68	Drainage System (Storm Water (2nd increment to Project 38)	†Note	(Projects 78 to 87, inclusive, were cancelled by BuDocks Directive of 29 March 1943)
23	Gatehouse and Security Fence	46	Incinerator 2 short tons (4,000 lb; 1,800 kg)	69*	Outlying Field No. 24; Clearing, Grading, Drainage, Sodding and relocating of fences.		

=== Construction ===
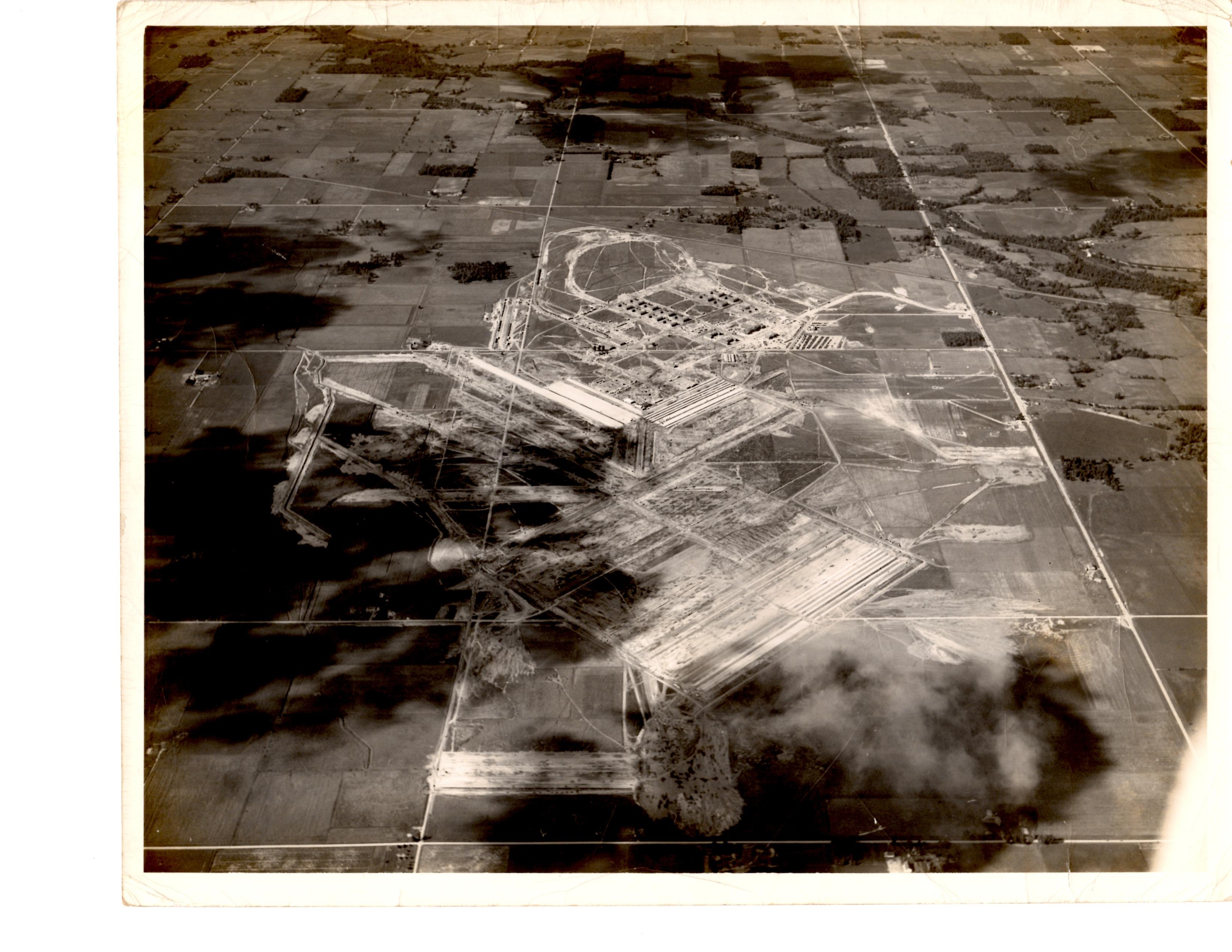
United States Naval Reserve Aviation Base, Peru, looking north from 6,500 ft (2,000 m) 24 August 1942

Preliminary plans for the base were issued 20 April 1942. The base was commissioned on 1 July 1942, with a contingent of Naval personnel moving in on 15 July 1942. Actual construction wasn't finished until 12 April 1943, with 99.5% field work completed. The final cost was $13,064,424.43.

The design called for a Naval Air Station, occupying 2,158 acres (873 ha), with the facilities and equipment to house and train 1,200 naval aviation cadets. This would include the housing and other necessary facilities needed for a total of 3,200 officers and men. Station facilities would include four runways of 5,000 ft (1,500 m) long and 200 ft (61 m) wide; a square landing mat with sides 2,500 ft (760 m) long (6,250,000 sq ft (581,000 m^{2}; 143 acres)); taxiways, warm-up aprons, and approaches; 77 buildings with 853,917 sq ft (79,331.5 m^{2}) of floor space, water supply, heating; and sewage disposal plants; 8.5 mi (13.7 km) of paved streets and 5 mi (8.0 km) of sidewalks. The training facilities included 25 auxiliary fields, within a 20 mi (32 km) radius, with a combined area of 4,696 acres (1,900 ha).

Of the 2,158 acres, approximately 75 acres (30 ha) were of dense timber that needed to be cleared. Other obstructions included, houses, barns, boulders, and county and state roads. The main base was, and still is, located approximately 9 mi (14 km) south of Peru, Indiana, on US Route 31; eighteen mi (29 km) north of Kokomo; Logansport 20 mi (32 km) to the northwest; and Wabash 20 mi to the northeast. Indianapolis, Indiana's capitol, is 64 mi (103 km) south; Fort Wayne 64 mi northeast, South Bend 70 mi (110 km) north, and Chicago 125 mi (201 km) northwest.

The Site Selection Board selected this site because it was centrally located with ready accessibility from several large cities. The land is level for miles around, which afforded many possibilities for auxiliary fields. It was out of the flight routes of commercial airlines. The soil type was satisfactory with gravel being locally available for concrete. It could be serviced by the Pennsylvania Railroad, with a station only 1.5 mi (2.4 km) away and construction of a switch track easily possible; also paved highways and bus lines nearby. Electrical power available from Peru. Satisfactory climate conditions, as indicated by Weather Bureau Reports. Water treatment for the steam boilers seemed to be the only draw back.

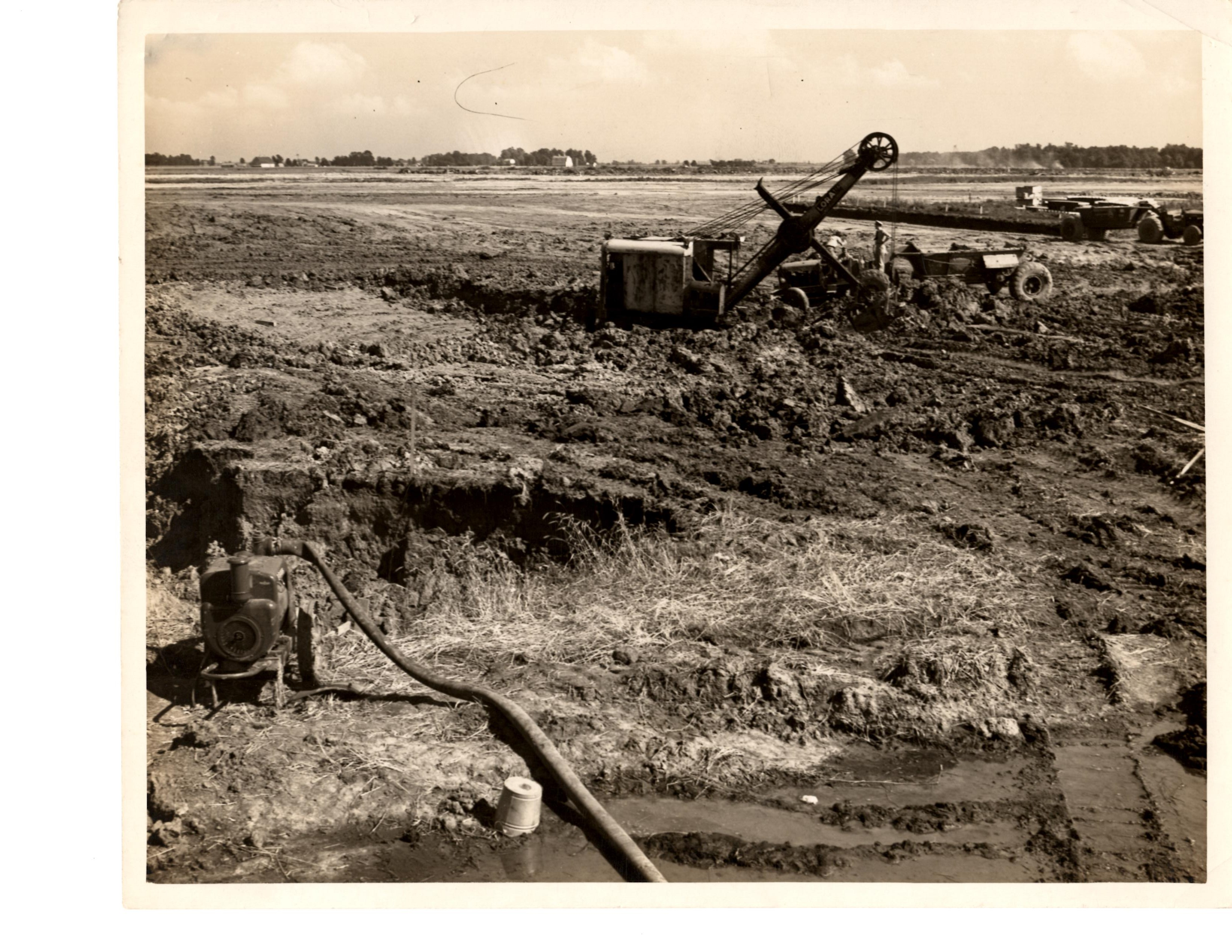
United States Naval Reserve Aviation Base, Peru, Hangar B excavation 20 June 1942.

Upon receiving the Letter of Intent on 28 March 1942, Russell B. Moore Company established a temporary headquarters and moved personnel and necessary drafting, surveying and office equipment and supplies to an old schoolhouse at Bunker Hill, which they occupied until completion of the Construction Engineering Office on the site 13 May 1942. Surveying the site started 1 April 1942. J.L. Simmons Company, Inc. and United Construction Company received their Letter of Intent 4 April 1942, and immediately began moving equipment in to clear the site, including removal of buildings, trees, and grading as soon as elevations for the finished grade had been determined. Temporary structures were built, including a cement warehouse, a large general warehouse, 200 ft × 75 ft (61 m × 23 m), time office, a large number of movable, built on skids for easy removal, tool storage sheds and small storehouses. All construction material was delivered by truck until the completion of the spur track on 10 June 1942, after which a large portion of the construction material came in by rail. Peak days of traffic volume were as follows: 129 freight carloads of paving material received via the spur track on 30 October 1942, and 1755 truck loads of paving material received on 25 October 1942.

In addition to the previously mentioned builds, a combined saw mill and carpenter shop was constructed, and equipped with wood working machinery. A temporary building was built and equipped as a restaurant, in which lunches were served to all persons on site at a moderate cost. A combination garage and repair shop was constructed and equipped to keep equipment in operating condition. A first aid building, staffed by two nurses was built. Night lighting, so paving operations could continue at night, was provided by electric floodlights. One large diesel powered permanent type generator with overhead distribution wiring, and several portable gasoline powered generators produced the electricity.

Many of the buildings utilized standard BuDocks plans and specifications for standard air station buildings. Specialized buildings were designed by the Moore Company. Most of the buildings were of a light, temporary type, designed to only be used for a limited time.

The safety record during construction was: one serious fire at Subsistence Building 26, 4,043 first aid cases, with 465 of those needing services of a physician. On the night of 3 August 1942, building 26 caught fire while it was about 90% complete, damage was estimated at 53% of its value.

Due to cost overruns, some of the projects were moved to contracts NOy 5938 and NOy 5958.

==== Runways and warming-up platforms ====
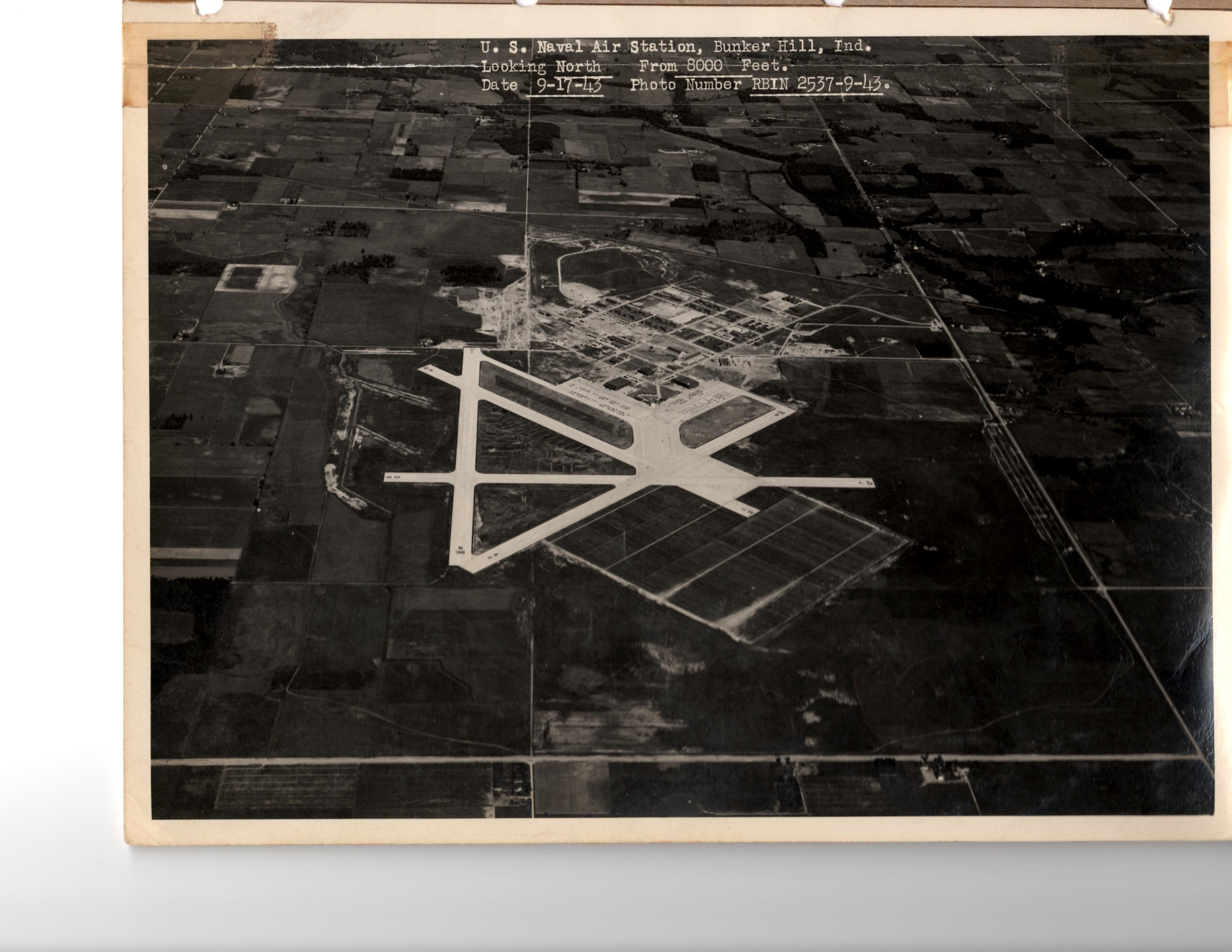
United States Naval Air Station, Bunker Hill, looking north from 8,000 ft (2,400 m) 17 September 1943

Initially the four runways were to be 3,600 ft (1,100 m) long and constructed of macadam with asphalt topping, along with the landing mat. On 30 October 1942, Change "G", ordered the runways lengthened to 5000 ft, and to now be constructed of concrete. Each runway was 8 in (203 mm) thick and not reinforced. The runways ran northeast to southwest, northwest to southeast, east to west, and north to south. Lights were located every 400 ft (120 m) along the length of three runways, with the northwest to southeast runway being spaced at 200 ft (61 m) intervals. The ends of the runways were separately marked with two, three, four, and five lights. There was a temporary 2,000 sq ft (190 m^{2}) landing field built for official visits during construction of the base.

The Warming-up Platform consisted of 8 in (200 mm) thick unreinforced concrete lanes 20 ft × 120 ft (6.1 m × 36.6 m), with a total area of 209,940 sq yd (175,540 m^{2}), with 2800 steel mooring eyes located in the concrete.

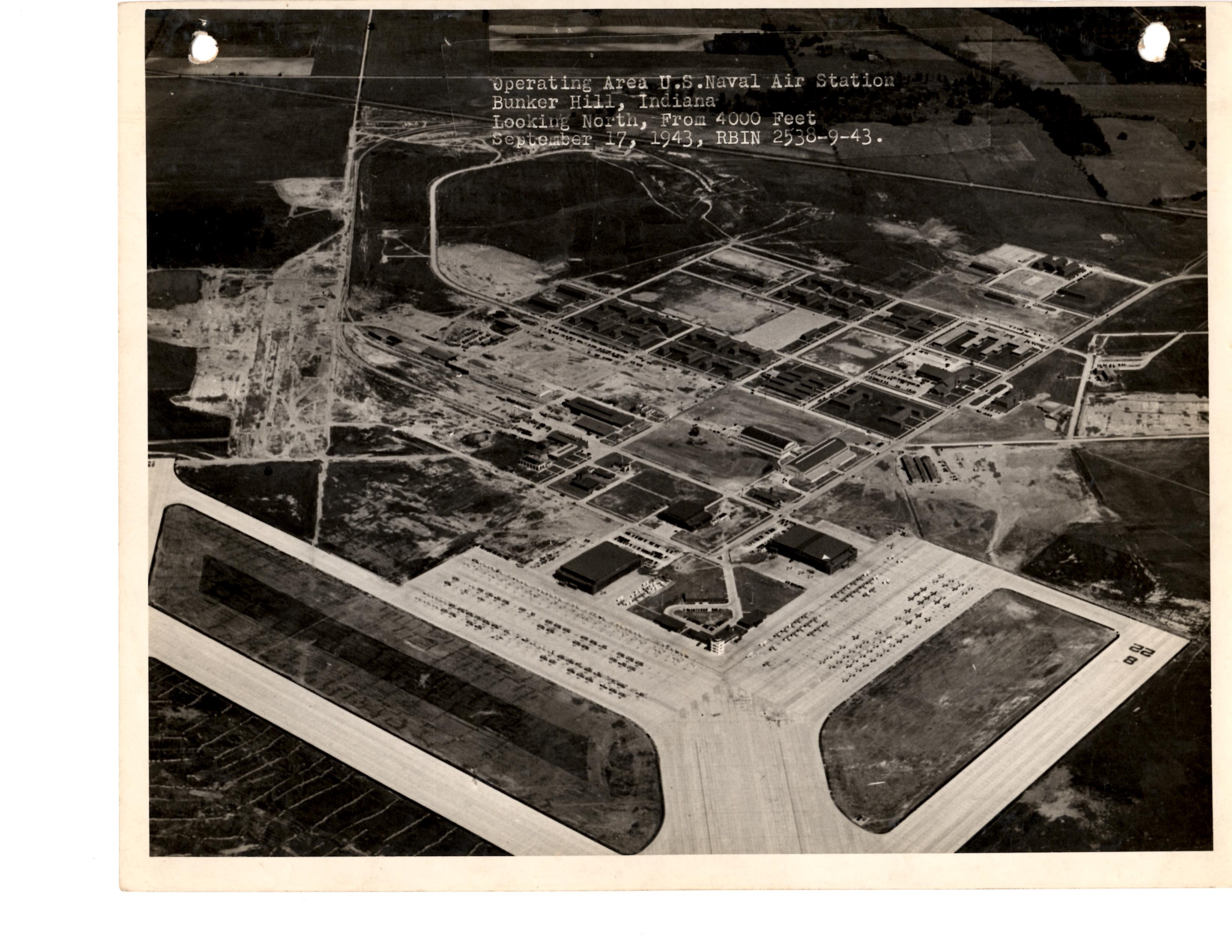
United States Naval Air Station, Bunker Hill, Looking North 4000 ft 9-17-1943

==== Barracks ====
Buildings 29A–29H consisted of eight B1 Type Barracks for the enlisted men. These barracks were two-story, H-shaped framed buildings 168 ft × 100 ft (51 m × 30 m). The second floor ceilings were insulated and the exterior wall finish was cement asbestos shingles. Each building housed 230 men, and were 17,720 sq ft (1,646 m^{2}). The students were housed in similar B1 Type Barracks, buildings 30A, 30B, 30G, and 30H, but with only a capacity for 200 men.

Buildings 31A and 31B, Junior Bachelor Officers' Quarters, did not utilize standard construction plans. They were two-story rectangular frame buildings 136 ft 4 in (41.55 m)×29 ft 6 in (8.99 m), with partial basements enclosing the heater rooms that were 11 ft 6 in (3.51 m)×12 ft (3.7 m). They each contained 42 rooms for officers, with recreation rooms, screened porch, showers, and toilets. Each building could house 84 officers and had 8,500 sq ft (790 m^{2}).

Building 31E was the Bachelor Officers' Quarters with Messing Facilities. An irregular shaped, two-story frame building, 168 ft × 148 ft (51 m × 45 m), with a partial, 34 ft × 74 ft (10 m × 23 m) basement. The first floor contained a lounge, mess hall, galley, office, vestibule, officers' quarters and toilets; second floor, officers' quarters, lounge, toilets and showers, and dormitory for help. The galley contained electrical cooking equipment.

There was a 35,741 sq ft (3,320.4 m^{2}) drill field between the barracks, with a 212 ft × 456 ft (65 m × 139 m), 10,741 sq ft (997.9 m^{2}), portion stabilized with water-bound macadam for use in all types of weather.

==== Mess halls ====
Buildings 26 and 26A, were S2 Type Subsistence buildings. They were single story, irregular shaped frame buildings 210 ft × 224 ft (64 m × 68 m); two partial basements for transformers, each 16 ft 6 in (5.03 m)×8 ft 9 in (2.67 m). They had a seating copacity of 912 men with 31,350 sq ft (2,913 m^{2}). The cadets' mess, buildings 27 and 27A, were S1 Type Subsistence buildings, which were smaller, at 210 ft × 180 ft (64 m × 55 m); one partial basement, 22 ft 7 in (6.88 m)×11 ft 9 in (3.58 m). The seating capacity was 456 men with 18,100 sq ft (1,680 m^{2}).

==== Training buildings ====
Buildings 4A and 4B were the Instruction buildings. These were used to instruct cadets in physics, radio, mathematics, theory of flight, navigation, aerology, and gunnery. The buildings were two-story H-shaped with the same dimensions as the B1 Type barrack. The first floor contained class rooms in the wings with a study room in the central portion, while the second floor had a plane and ship recognition room and an assembly room that was 72 ft × 28 ft (21.9 m × 8.5 m).

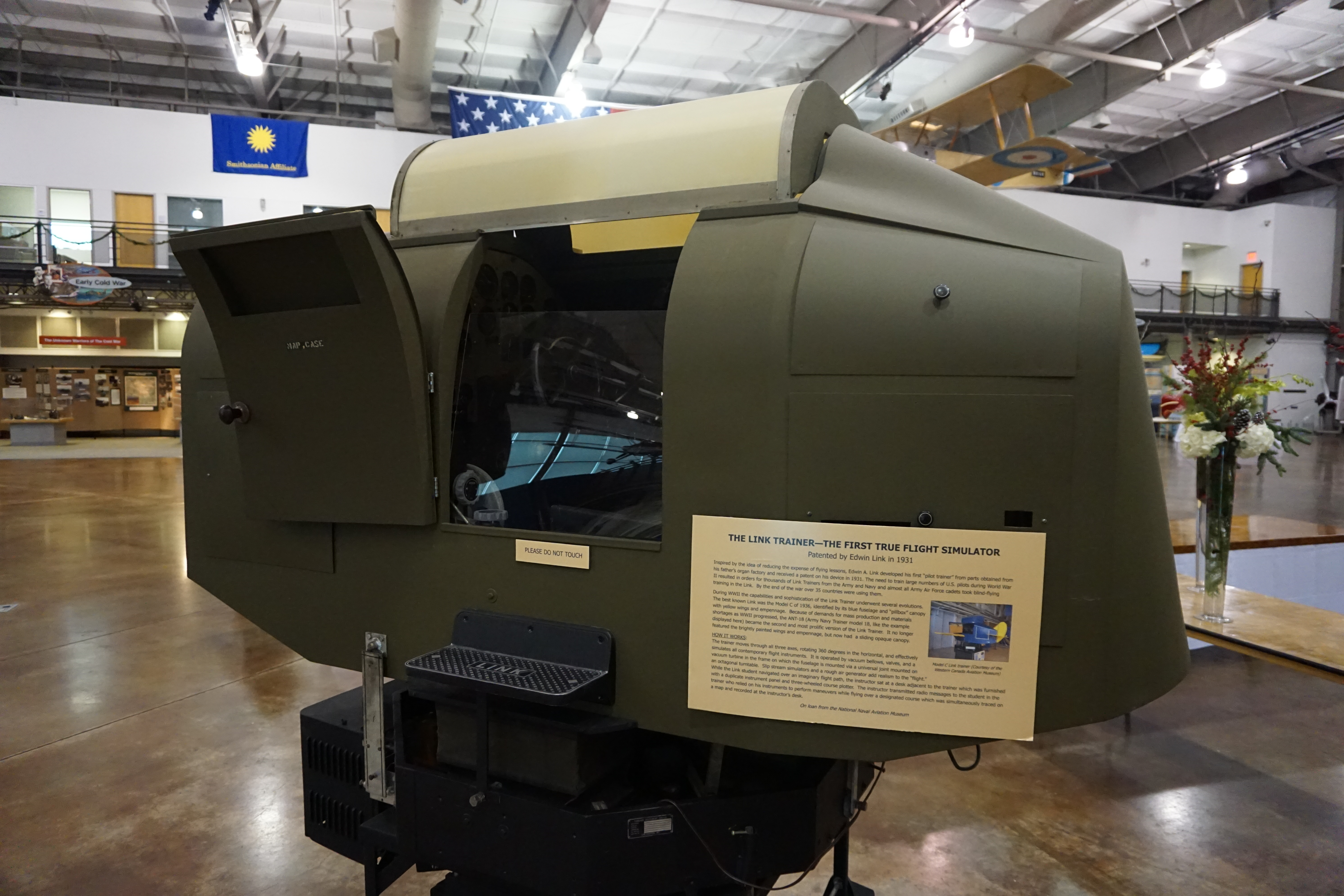
Frontiers of Flight Museum December 2015 016 (Link Trainer)

Building 39 was the Link Trainer building. It was a one-story rectangular frame building, 141 ft × 46 ft (43 m × 14 m), which contained two trainer rooms, with a capacity of 16 trainers, along with offices and toilets. This building was air conditioned.

==== Commons buildings ====
Building 22, the Dispensary, with 109 beds, contained two wards, operating suite, sick officers' quarters, pharmacy, diet kitchen, x-ray rooms, physiotherapy, solarium, showers, and toilets. It was an irregularly shaped, 346 ft × 312 ft (105 m × 95 m), height 11 ft 6 in (3.51 m), with a partial basement 40 ft × 145 ft (12 m × 44 m), that contained the morgue and storage rooms. The x-ray rooms had sheet lead lined walls. The floor area was 48,920 sq ft (4,545 m^{2}).

Building 23, Auditorium and Recreation building, was a partial two-story, T-shaped frame building, 314 ft × 200 ft (96 m × 61 m). Three partial basements, 83 ft × 18 ft (25.3 m × 5.5 m), 11 ft × 18 ft (3.4 m × 5.5 m), and 15 ft 6 in (4.72 m)×10 ft (3.0 m), contained heater, compressor, pump room, transformer and lockers. The auditorium roof used wood arch trusses which allowed a clear height of 43 ft (13 m) in the center, and measured 83 ft × 112 ft (25 m × 34 m). The first floor of the auditorium contained a stage, two dressing rooms, lounge, soda fountain, cafeteria, canteen, Ships Service store, billiard room, barber shop, cobbler shop, tailor shop, showers and toilets. The second floor had a lounge, library, reading and writing rooms, Chaplain's office, CPO recreation rooms, showers, and toilets. The main floor had a seating capacity of 1,500 men with another 280 in the balcony. Total floor area was 43,010 sq ft (3,996 m^{2}).

Building 24 was the Water Survival Training Pool. The building was a rectangular, 120 ft × 260 ft (37 m × 79 m), two-story building, with a partial basement. The basement contained a boiler room, 22 ft 6 in (6.86 m)×24 ft 6 in (7.47 m), which housed two K-44-S14-LPS boilers; fan/blower room, 19 ft (5.8 m)×24 ft 6 in (7.47 m); coagulation basin and filter room, both measuring 20 ft 7 in (6.27 m)×12 ft 8 in (3.86 m); and a coal bin and transformer room of unknown dimension. The building was of a Quonset style with a 58 ft (18 m) radius of curvature on the roof. At the time of its construction it was touted as the second-largest indoor pool in the world. It was intended to be used for lifeboat and abandon ship training. The pool itself was 75 ft × 150 ft (23 m × 46 m) with upper galleries. The galleries lead to two platforms of wooden boards supported by pipe scaffolding bolted to the laminated arches and to the ceiling, at the deep end of the pool. These platforms were approximately 25 ft (7.6 m) high with pipe fences surrounding them, they simulated the height of an aircraft carrier and were used for practicing lifeboat drills and abandon ship maneuvers. There were three diving boards at the north end of the pool, with the center diving board 3 m (9.8 ft) above the water, and the outer two 1 m (3 ft 3 in) above the water. There were also three ladders on the east and west sides of the pool for ingress and egress. The first floor also contained lockers, toilets, and towel issue stations.

Building 36 was the Armory. This was a 100 ft × 27.5 ft (30.5 m × 8.4 m), one-story building with racks in two rooms with a capacity for 3,836 guns, along with toilet facilities. Building 33 was the Small Arms Magazine. A one-story, 25 ft × 19 ft (7.6 m × 5.8 m), reinforced concrete building, windowless, with a floor level 4.5 in (110 mm) below grade level. The building was covered in a mound of earth with a ventilation duct extending to the top of the mound.

Building 44 was originally earmarked for a Brig, but was changed to a Reception Center. It was a one-story rectangular frame building, 51 ft × 33 ft (16 m × 10 m), with a partial, 10 ft × 19 ft (3.0 m × 5.8 m), basement that contained an oil fired steam boiler.

==== Administration buildings ====
Building No. 1 was the administration building. The two-story U-shaped building was 146 ft × 64 ft (45 m × 20 m), with a partial basement, 9 ft × 12 ft (2.7 m × 3.7 m), that contained the heater room. The general administrative offices of the Station were on the first floor, while the second floor had the Commanding Officers' and Executive Officer's suites, communications and record offices. The total floor area was 13,600 sq ft (1,260 m^{2}).

Buildings 2E and 2W were the Squadron Administration buildings. These were utilized by the cadets for flight preparation. Each building contained a squadron Commander's room, flight control room, parachute and flying gear issue rooms, cadet ready room and a locker room. The buildings were rectangular, 97 ft × 43 ft (30 m × 13 m), one-story structures with 4,500 sq ft (420 m^{2}) of floor space.

Building 3 was the gatehouse; this also included the security fence. The gatehouse was a one-story, 24.5 ft × 8.5 ft (7.5 m × 2.6 m) building located on an island in the center of the entrance roadway. There was a boiler in the basement of the gatehouse that provided steam for heat. The security fence was a 6 ft (1.8 m) chain link fence surmounted with barbed wire, with seven locking gates that extended at a minimum of 10 ft (3.0 m) within the property line of the base, 40 ft (12 m) along State Highway 218. Building 3A was the Guardhouse. This was a one-story, 27 ft × 27 ft (8.2 m × 8.2 m), building with a 9 ft (2.7 m) wide porch on two sides.

==== Flight operations buildings ====
Building 6 was the operations building. All flight operations were controlled from an air-conditioned observation room in the control tower of this building, which had windows overlooking the runway and landing mat areas. Signalling, radio sending and receiving equipment, and switches controlling the electric lighting of the runways were operated from this room. Communications, radio and weather reporting offices were located on the second floor, with offices of the operating personnel, aerology department and record department on the first floor. The building was L-shaped, 133 ft × 123 ft (41 m × 37 m), containing the reinforced concrete control tower, that was 33 ft × 33 ft (10 m × 10 m) by 48 ft (15 m) high. Two small partial basements enclosed pump and heater rooms. There was also a motor driven electric beacon and meteorological instruments.

Buildings 7E and 7F were temporary hangars. They were rectangular 240 ft × 160 ft (73 m × 49 m) by 43 ft (13 m) high; of wood construction; roof supported by wood trusses, with 120 ft (37 m) span, on wood columns; wood doors, 30 ft (9.1 m) high, that rolled on steel tracks providing clear openings of 30 ft × 240 ft (9.1 m × 73.2 m) when opened. One end of each hangar had a two-story lean-to which contained offices, shops, and toilets on the first floor, and a mezzanine, 20 ft × 160 ft (6.1 m × 48.8 m), divided into offices, parts and storage rooms. Each hangar had a total floor area of 50,580 sq ft (4,699 m^{2}).

Building 8 was the Assembly and Repair Shop. The two-story building was rectangular, 161 ft × 141 ft (49 m × 43 m), with a one-story wing on each end. The center section, for final assembly, had a clear area, unobstructed by columns, 80 ft × 120 ft (24 m × 37 m), with a 5 short tons (4.5 t) overhead crane. Other portions of the first floor were divided into wing and engine overhaul, starter and accessory overhaul, carburetor shop, machine shop, piston and cylinder repair, and tear down shops. General and small offices were located on the second floor balcony.

Building 9 was the Parachute building with a tower. A one-story rectangular building, 61 ft × 81 ft (19 m × 25 m), for parachute storage, repairing, packing and issue, with a parachute cleaning shower and drying tower, 20 ft × 30 ft (6.1 m × 9.1 m) by 38 ft (12 m) high. A partial basement, 20 ft × 21 ft (6.1 m × 6.4 m), contained pump and fan rooms. The building had an electric powered air conditioning unit and electric driven sewing machines.

Building 11 was the Paint and Dope Spray Booth. This was a two-story building with a one-story section, 63 ft 3 in (19.28 m)×33 ft 4 in (10.16 m). The building contained Bink's Paint Spraying and Air Washing Equipment, including blowers, air washing and purifying devices, and exhaust fans, installed to minimize danger of explosions and inhalation of fumes. Building 8 was the Paint, Oil and Dope Storage Building. It was an 81 ft × 33 ft (25 m × 10 m) one-story rectangular building. The building was divided into three rooms for engine oil, oil storage, and dope storage.

Building 13 housed the engine test stand. This was a one-story concrete block wall and partition building, with reinforced concrete floor and flat roof slab, 137 ft 4 in (41.86 m)×14 ft 4 in (4.37 m). It contained six engine test stands; three engine test cells; engine and embalming room; toilets and boiler room.

Building 38 was the General and Aircraft Storage. It was a one-story, 301 ft × 81 ft (92 m × 25 m), rectangular building. There was a 16 ft × 180 ft (4.9 m × 54.9 m) monitor skylight running down the center of the building and one large and two small offices with toilets at one end.

==== Facilities buildings ====
Building 14 was the storehouse, a rectangular, one-story, 161 ft × 77 ft (49 m × 23 m) building, with offices at one end.

Building 17 was the garage. It was a one-story, rectangular, 160 ft × 60 ft (49 m × 18 m) building with a partial basement, 12 ft × 22 ft (3.7 m × 6.7 m), for the heater and pump room. The first floor contained a parts room, locker room, offices, stock room, toilets, and a balcony at one end that contained offices.

Building 15 was the Heating Plant. This one-story, rectangular, reinforced concrete building, was 38 ft × 97 ft (12 m × 30 m) and stood 21 ft (6.4 m) tall. A mezzanine balcony contained a toilet, shower, and wash room. The building was equipped with four oil fired steam generating boilers, each able to 13,500 lb (6,100 kg) of steam per hour at 100 psi (690 kPa) pressure, and the additional equipment needed, oil burners, pumps, and water heaters. The building also contained three secondary concrete fuel oil storage tanks with a capacity of 25,000 US gal (95,000 L; 21,000 imp gal) that were connected to the main 275,000 US gal (1,040,000 L; 229,000 imp gal) storage tank. Structures 16 and 43 were for fuel oil storage. Fuel oil would be unloaded at the fuel oil transfer house, building 43, a 16 ft (4.9 m)×14 ft 6 in (4.42 m), reinforced concrete building, from railroad tank cars. Three tank cars could be unload simultaneously, the oil being pumped to a 275,000 gal. pre-stressed reinforced concrete storage tank, building 16, 72 ft (22 m) diameter and 10 ft (3.0 m) high tank buried 4 ft (1.2 m) below grade and covered with earth. A small gauge and apparatus room adjoined the tank. Oil flowed by gravity from the tank to the heating plant in steam heated pipes to prevent coagulation. With the exception of a few buildings equipped with separate boilers, all buildings on Station were supplied with 100 psi (690 kPa) of steam through a 38,000 ft (12,000 m) welded underground steam distribution supply and return mains. The steam was used for both heating and hot water heating.

Buildings 48–1 through 48–5 were transformer houses. The city of Peru provided a 33,000 volt transmission line that fed a sub-station at the northeast corner of the base. The sub-station had three 500KVA step down transformers that took the voltage from 33,000 volt, 3 phase, 3 wire to 12,500 volt, 3 phase, 4 wire. Primary distribution was then by aerial or underground transmission to secondary distribution locations. There were 4.35 mi (7.00 km) of overhead line, with 17 mi (27 km) of bare copper wire; and 4 mi (6.4 km) of underground line, with 13 mi (21 km) of lead covered cable, 15.5 mi (24.9 km) of fiber conduit encased in concrete and 58 manholes. To further step down the voltage for use in buildings, 18 transformer banks were utilized, with 67 oil insulated, air cooled transformers in transformer vaults and transformer houses, with a total capacity of 3,119 KVA volts. Standby emergency electricity was supplied by two 175 kW (235 hp) generators connected to two 12 cylinder gasoline engines.

Building 40 was the Fire Station. This was a one-story, rectangular building, 92 ft × 40 ft (28 m × 12 m). It had an apparatus room, office, toilets, dormitory, and a hose tower that was 8 ft × 8 ft (2.4 m × 2.4 m) by 37 ft (11 m) tall.

Water and Fire Protection were provided by building 21 and Well Houses 42–1 and 42–2. Two 160 ft (49 m) deep 12 in (300 mm) wells provided water for the base. The well houses had pumps capable of 350 U.S. gal/min (0.022 m^{3}/s) that transferred the water through an 8 in (200 mm) line to the treatment plant, building 21. Building 21 was a partial two-story reinforced concrete building adjoining an underground 450,000 US gal (1,700,000 L; 370,000 imp gal) concrete emergency reservoir for treated water. The building contained electric motor driven pumps, tanks, chlorinators, dry chemical feeders, and filters for purifying and softening the water. Six mi (9.7 km) of cast iron pipe, 2 to 10 in (51 to 254 mm) diameter, distributed the water under 45 psi (310 kPa) pressure to 46 fire hydrants and 2,405 water fixtures on the station.

Structures 19A–D were for gasoline storage and distribution. Delivered by tank car at four unloading points on a special railroad siding, and by gasoline trucks at four additional points, the gasoline was stored in four underground pre-stressed reinforced concrete tanks that were lined with Thiokol. Three of the tanks had 50,000 US gal (190,000 L; 42,000 imp gal) capacity and were used for 73 octane gasoline. The other was a 25,000 US gal (95,000 L; 21,000 imp gal) tank used for 100 octane gasoline. The fuel was pumped to distribution points through two separate piping systems, one for 73 octane and one for 100 octane, by two submerged type multiple stage centrifugal, 200 U.S. gal/min (0.013 m^{3}/s), pumps at each tank; each pump powered with a 15 hp (11 kW) electric motor. Distribution points for 73 octane gasoline consisted of a tank truck filling stand, 200 gpm, and 56 gasoline servicing pits for fuelling planes directly, located at the warmup aprons, with capacity to fuel 48 planes simultaneously at the rate of 25 U.S. gal/min (0.0016 m^{3}/s) per plane. The 100 octane gasoline, the tank truck filling stand was capable of 300 U.S. gal/min (0.019 m^{3}/s), and four planes could be fueled at a rate of 100 U.S. gal/min (0.0063 m^{3}/s). The system included 2.7 mi (4.3 km) of 1 to 12 in (25 to 305 mm) diameter welded steel pipe. The 100 octane system was actually used for 87 octane gasoline with 100 octane being provided by a later contract.

A main railroad spur, 9,928 ft (3,026 m) long, connected the station to the Pennsylvania Railroad under a revocable agreement. Additional spurs for unloading gasoline branched off the main with an additional 4,236 ft (1,291 m) of track.

=== World War II Navy service ===
Naval Reserve Air Base Peru, as the base was named when commissioned, was built to train United States Navy, United States Marine Corps and United States Coast Guard pilots. The base would go through several names just during WWII. On 1 January 1943, the name was changed to Naval Air Station Peru (NAS Peru), and only three months later on 1 March 1943, the name changed again, this time to Naval Air Station Bunker Hill (NAS Bunker Hill), which it kept for the rest of the war.

Pilots would study for 12 weeks in a pre-flight school, then transfer to Bunker Hill for an additional 12 weeks of flight training, after which, they would transfer to intermediate aviation training stations such as Naval Air Station Pensacola. During the course of their training at Bunker Hill cadets would study celestial and dead-reckoning navigation, radio communication, care and repair of engines, physical fitness training that included boxing, wrestling, hand-to-hand fighting, and swimming. The base trained 5,997 American Naval Aviation Cadets, of which 4,568 qualified to advance to Intermediate Flight Training, while 854 were sent to Naval Station Great Lakes for reclassification. In addition to the American cadets, Bunker Hill trained 701 British Royal Navy cadets.

By 31 March 1945, there were 407 N2S-3 Kaydet trainers, nearly one-quarter of the U.S. Navy's inventory.

One of the most famous alumni of Bunker Hill was former major league baseball player Ted Williams. He received training as a Marine Corps Naval Aviator at NAS Bunker Hill.

After World War II the base area reverted to farming use, with a civilian crew of government caretakers maintaining the military buildings.

=== Transfer to the United States Air Force ===
The United States Air Force obtained right of entry to 25 buildings from United States Navy on 16 November 1951, and used the base under United States Air Force Storage Branch. Still in inactive status, it was transferred from the Navy to the Air Force on 31 March 1954.

==== 323d Fighter-Bomber Wing and 319th Fighter-Interceptor Squadron ====
In the wake of the Korean War, the Air Force reopened the installation as Bunker Hill Air Force Base on 22 June 1954, and assigned it to Tactical Air Command. The base began to host the 4433d Air Base Squadron and the 323d Fighter-Bomber Wing and the 323d Air Base Group coming under TAC's Ninth Air Force. Initially training with North American F-86Fs, these were quickly upgraded to the North American F-86H Sabre and then to the North American F-100A/D in 1956 to become proficient in tactical air operations. The wing's aircraft wore a band on the tail, and around the nose edged with small black checkers. In 1955, the 319th Fighter Interceptor Training Squadron of the Air Defense Command joined forces at the base, reporting to the 4706th Air Defense Wing at K. I. Sawyer AFB, Michigan. Initially operating the F-89 Scorpion interceptor, the mission of the 319th FIS was the air defense of the southern Great Lakes and Chicago-Gary-Central Indiana region. It was later upgraded to the F-94 Starfire. The ADC interceptors remained until 1 January 1959.

=== Strategic Air Command ===
Strategic Air Command (SAC) assumed operational control of Bunker Hill Air Force Base from Tactical Air Command on 1 September 1957, with the 8th Air Force assuming jurisdiction of the base; the Air Force then inactivated the 323d Fighter-Bomber Wing, and the 4041st Air Base Group arrived that day. The Air Force began to station the new Boeing KC-135A Stratotanker on the base in 1957.

==== 305th Bombardment Wing, Medium ====
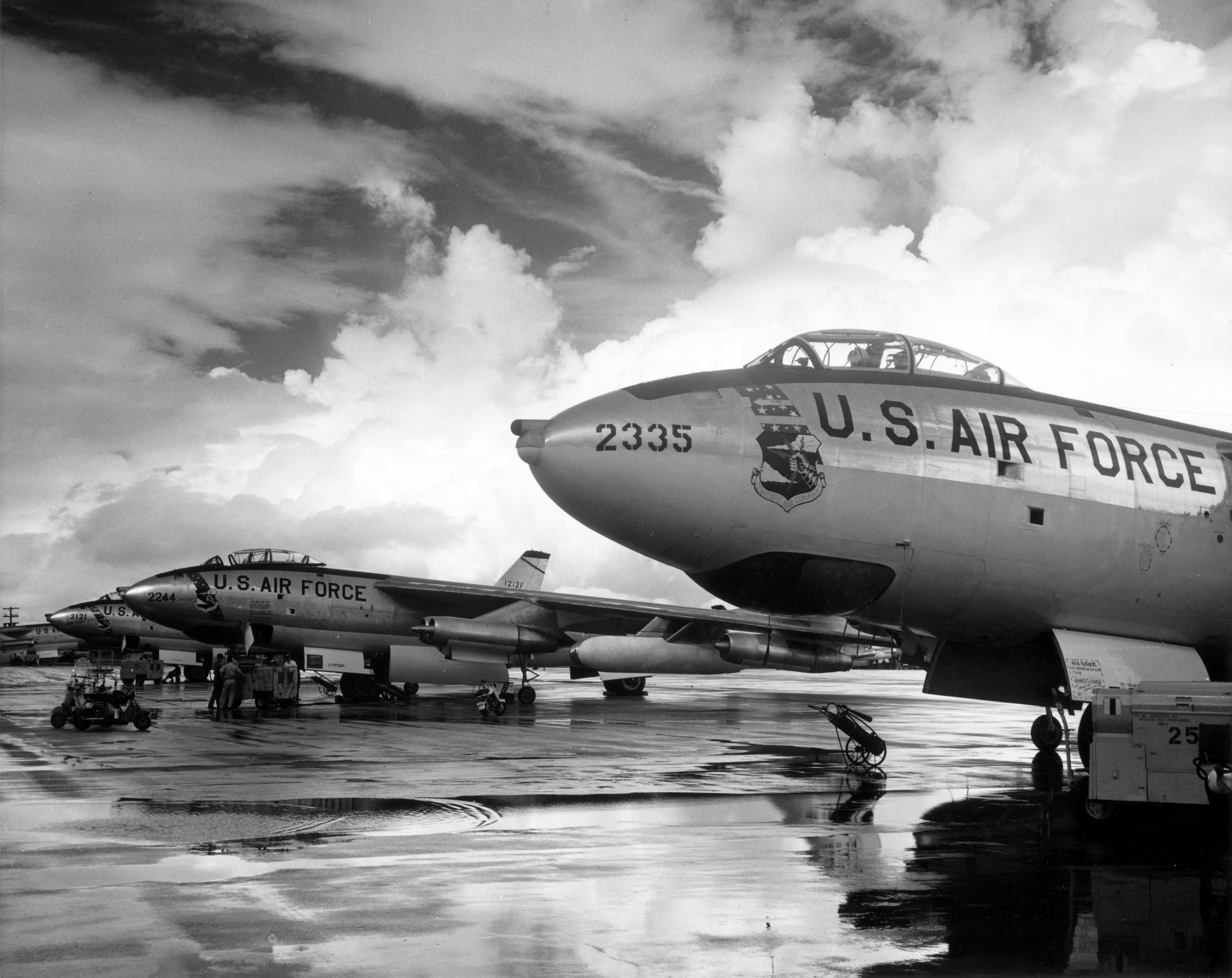
SAC B-47s on the flight line

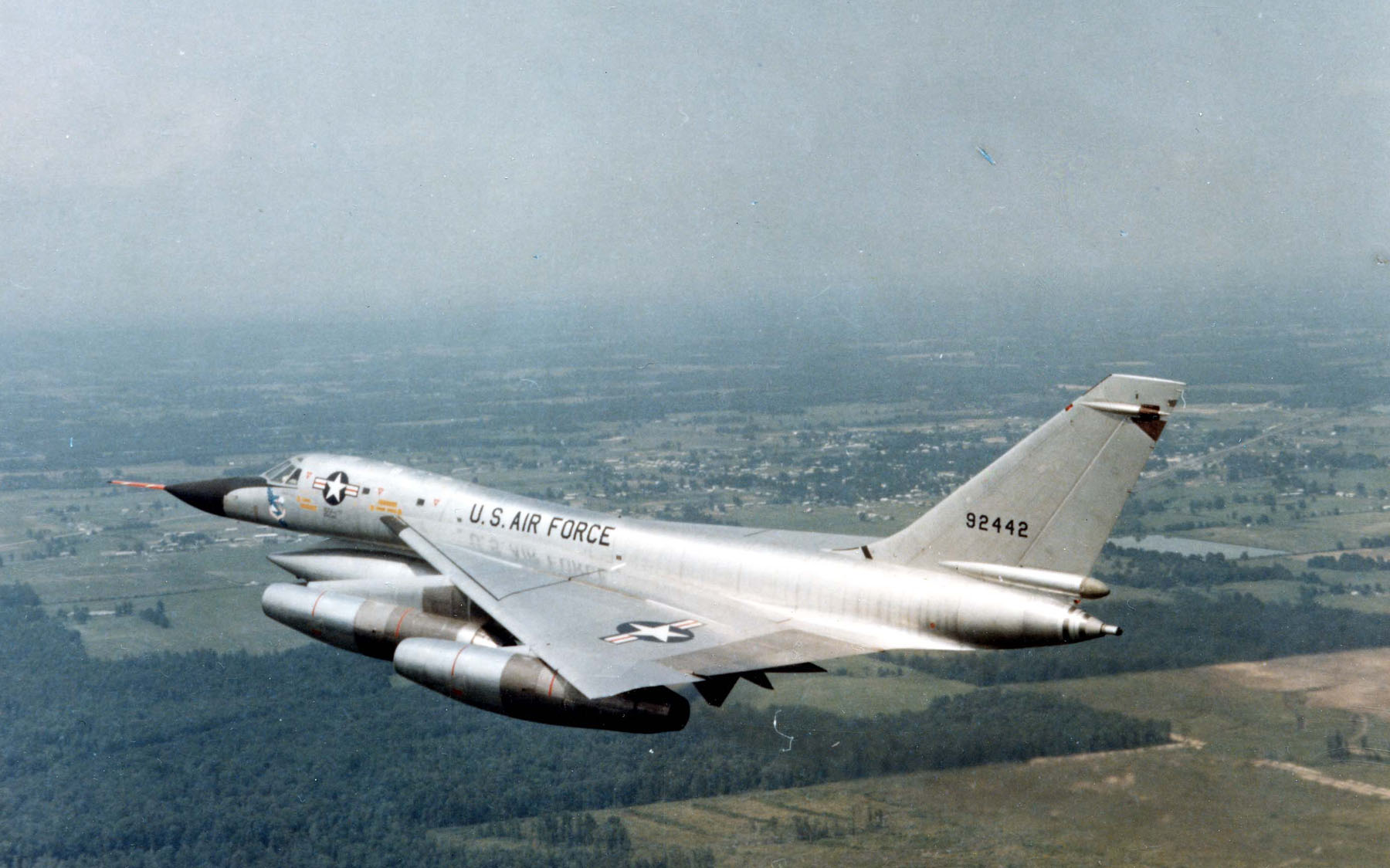
Convair B-58A Hustler in flight (AF Ser. No. 59-2442). Photo taken on 29 June 1967 061101-F-1234P-019

On 1 June 1959, Strategic Air Command moved the 305th Bombardment Wing, Medium, (305 BMW) from MacDill Air Force Base in Florida to Bunker Hill Air Force Base. At the time, the wing flew the Boeing B-47 Stratojet; later, the supersonic Convair B-58 Hustler began replacing the B-47s. Starting in 1960, the Air Force equipped the 319th Fighter-Interceptor Squadron with the F-106 Delta Dart until the squadron departed on 1 March 1963.

==== Nuclear accident ====
On 8 December 1964, a B-58 carrying five nuclear weapons, including a 9-megaton thermonuclear bomb, slid off an icy runway and caught fire during a training mission. While taxiing it was caught in the jet blast from the aircraft in front of it while turning onto the runway and applying power of its own. This caused the bomber to lose control and slide off the left hand side of the taxiway. The left main landing gear passed over a flush mounted taxiway light fixture, 10 ft (3.0 m) further the landing gear grazed the left edge of a concrete light base. After traveling another 10 ft the left main landing gear struck an electrical manhole box which caused it to collapse, rupturing a fuel tank. The aircraft then caught fire.

The aircraft commander, Leary Johnson, and defensive system operator, Roger Hall, were able to escape with minor injuries. However, the navigator, Manuel "Rocky" Cervantes, ejected in his escape capsule, which landed 548 ft (167 m) from the bomber; he did not survive. The five nuclear weapons on board were burned, causing contamination of the crash area. The Air Force claimed that the crash site was cleaned of contamination, however, it was discovered that the aircraft and some of the soil from the area were only removed to another site on the base and reburied. The burned bombs were shipped to Atomic Energy Commission facilities at Clarksville, Tennessee, Medina Base, Texas, Rocky Flats, Colorado, Miamisburg, Ohio, and Oak Ridge, Tennessee, where it was determined that none of the plutonium from the weapons was released. A 1996 survey found that the area of the crash were still contaminated and required further remediation of the site.

==== Apollo 1 disaster – renaming base ====
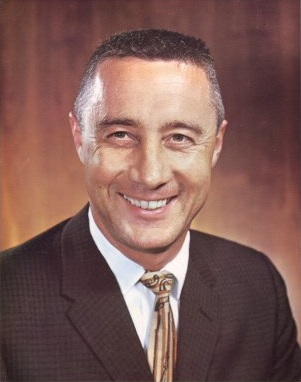
Lieutenant-Colonel Virgil I. "Gus" Grissom (3 April 1926 – 27 January 1967)

On 27 January 1967, the cabin of the Apollo 1 spacecraft caught fire during a pre-launch preparation at Cape Canaveral Air Force Station Launch Complex 34, killing United States Air Force astronaut Lieutenant Colonel Virgil I. "Gus" Grissom, a Mitchell, Indiana, native and Purdue University graduate. The Air Force officially renamed Bunker Hill Air Force Base as Grissom Air Force Base in his honor on 12 May 1968.

==== 305th Air Refueling Wing ====
With the retirement of the B-58 in 1970, the Air Force redesignated the 305th Bombardment Wing, Medium, as the 305th Air Refueling Wing (305 ARW) on 1 January 1970. The Air Force transferred the 70th Air Refueling Squadron from another wing at Little Rock Air Force Base to the 305th Air Refueling Wing in 1970. From the early 1970s, the 305th Air Refueling Wing deployed KC-135 aircraft to Europe, Alaska, Greenland, and the Pacific to support worldwide tanker task forces. Meanwhile, with the closing of Bakalar Air Force Base, near Columbus, the 931st Air Refueling Wing arrived on 15 January 1970.

In June 1972, the 305th Air Refueling Squadron deployed elements to Korat Air Base, Thailand, as the 4104th Air Refueling Squadron (Provisional). Later in 1972 the 4104th ARS (P) was relocated to U-Tapao Royal Thai Navy Airfield.

=== Combined active duty and reserve operations ===
The Air Force Reserve joined the Grissom personnel complement in the early 1970s with the activation of the 434th Special Operations Wing (434 SOW) and their Cessna A-37 Dragonfly aircraft to the base on 15 January 1971. On 1 October 1973, the Air Force Reserve redesignated the 434th Special Operations Wing as the 434th Tactical Fighter Wing, with the 434th later transitioning from the A-37 to the A-10 Thunderbolt II as the latter aircraft entered the USAF inventory..

In 1975, the Air Force inactivated the 3d Post Attack Command and Control System of the 305th Air Refueling Wing and transferred specialized Boeing EC-135s to the 70th Air Refueling Squadron of the 305th Air Refueling Wing. The 931st Air Refueling Group (931 ARG) departed on 1 July 1975. The United States Army Reserve began its presence at Grissom in the 1970s.

On 1 February 1978, the Air Force renamed the 305th Air Refueling Wing as the 305th Air Refueling Wing, Heavy. The Air Force activated the 931st Air Refueling Group at the base on 1 July 1978 as the second group of Air Force Reservists. The base also served as the home of one active duty wing and two reserve wings, using 60 KC-135 Stratotanker and 18 A-10 Thunderbolt II fighter aircraft. The 72d Air Refueling Squadron of the Air Force Reserve began operating its KC-135 Stratotanker aircraft from Grissom in 1978.

The 305th Air Refueling Wing, Heavy, provided tanker refueling support to units involved in the invasion of Grenada in October 1983. The 931st Air Refueling Group departed Grissom on 1 July 1987. The Air Force Reserve on 1 July 1978 redesignated the 434th Tactical Fighter Wing as the 434th Air Refueling Wing, Heavy, giving it a similar mission to that of the 305th Air Refueling Wing, Heavy.

The 305th Air Refueling Wing, Heavy, provided tanker support to units involved in the United States invasion of Panama in December 1989. From August 1990 to June 1991, deployed 305th Air Refueling Wing, Heavy, personnel and aircraft provided refueling support for air operations in southwest Asia as part of Operation Desert Storm. The 305th Air Refueling Wing, Heavy, also delivered food to the Kurds in Northern Iraq from April to May 1991. The Air Force redesignated the wing as 305th Air Refueling Wing on 1 September 1991.

The end of the Cold War led to a downsizing of the military. The Base Realignment and Closure Commission of 1991 recommended closure of Grissom Air Force Base. On 1 February 1992, the Air Force Reserve redesignated the 434th Air Refueling Wing, Heavy, as the 434th Air Refueling Wing and that year activated the 74th Air Refueling Squadron within the 434th Air Refueling Wing to operate the KC-135 Stratotanker. The Air Force inactivated Strategic Air Command (SAC) and realigned the 305th Air Refueling Wing to the newly established Air Mobility Command (AMC) on 15 June 1992. The Air Mobility Command merged air refueling aircraft from Strategic Air Command with strategic airlift aircraft (e.g., C-5, C-141 and tactical theater airlift aircraft (e.g., C-130) from the concurrently disestablishing Military Airlift Command (MAC). The Air Force Reserve renamed the 434th Air Refueling Wing as the 434th Wing on 1 August 1992. The Base Realignment and Closure Commission of 1993 directed realignment of Grissom Air Force Base to the Air Force Reserve (AFRES).

The 305th Air Refueling Wing phased out operations and ended its presence on base on 30 September 1994, when the Air Force inactivated it. The Air Force then immediately reactivated a new 305th Air Refueling Wing with different personnel and equipment at McGuire Air Force Base in New Jersey. The Air Force inactivated the KC-135Rs of the 70th Air Refueling Squadron of the 305th Air Refueling Wing; this squadron transferred to Travis Air Force Base in California, joined another wing, and used a different aircraft. The Air Force also retired the Boeing EC-135G/L radio relay aircraft as part of the demise of the Post Attack Command and Control System.

=== Air Force Reserve era ===
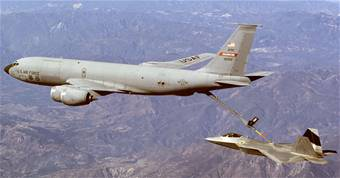
A KC-135R Stratotanker from the 434th Air Refueling Wing, Grissom Air Reserve Base, Air Force Reserve Command, Indiana.

Effective 1 October 1994, Grissom Air Force Base ceased active-duty operations, and the active Air Force transferred nearly half of the former base, including the runway, to the Air Force Reserve as Grissom Air Reserve Base. The Air Force Reserve (AFRES) redesignated the 434th Wing as the 434th Air Refueling Wing (434 ARW), and activated the 434th Mission Support Group. The 434th Air Refueling Wing operates two KC-135 Stratotanker air refueling squadrons, operationally within the Air Mobility Command (AMC).

Because of the inactivation of the installation's active duty KC-135 wing due to BRAC, the Air Force reassigned Grissom Air Force Base in 1994 to the Air Force Reserve which later became the Air Force Reserve Command (AFRC) in 1997. The base added Marine Corps Reserve units in 2001 and United States Navy Reserve units in 2002. In 2005, in an effort to consolidate Navy Reserve activities and units, the Navy Reserve transferred all its Grissom units to the Navy Operational Support Center at Heslar Naval Armory in Indianapolis, Indiana.

In 2008, Grissom Air Reserve Base entered into a joint-use agreement and opened its runway to civilian operations. Miami County Aviation manages the day-to-day civil operations at Grissom Air Reserve Base. The extremely long runway and instrument navigation facilities make Grissom Air Reserve Base especially well suited to business jets as a refueling stop for long cross-country flights. Civilian air traffic controllers also staff a radar approach control facility at the airport.

Until the retirement of the Space Shuttle on 21 July 2011, Grissom was also listed as one of the emergency landing sites due to its 12,500-foot runway.

In 2015, it was announced that the Grissom was in the running for a squadron of the new KC-46A Pegasus. In October, it was announced that the base would not be receiving the aircraft, which instead was allocated to the 916th Air Refueling Wing at Seymour Johnson Air Force Base. Grissom was also in competition with Westover Air Reserve Base and Tinker Air Force Base for basing of the KC-46A.

== Previous names ==
- Established as Naval Reserve Air Base Peru, 1 July 1942
- Renamed Naval Air Station Peru, 1 January 1943
- Renamed Naval Air Station Bunker Hill, 1 March 1943
- Deactivated and used for farming, 1946–1951
- Reestablished as United States Air Force Storage Branch, 16 November 1951
- Reestablished as Bunker Hill Air Force Base, 22 June 1954
- Renamed Grissom Air Force Base, 12 May 1968
- Renamed Grissom Air Reserve Base, 1 October 1994–present

== Major commands to which assigned ==
- Tactical Air Command, 22 June 1954
- Strategic Air Command, 1 September 1957
- Air Mobility Command, 1 June 1992
- Air Force Reserve Command, 1 October 1994

== Previous base operating units ==
- 4433d Air Base Squadron, 1 April 1955
- 323d Air Base Group, 8 August 1955
- 319th Fighter-Interceptor Squadron, 1 November 1955 – 1 March 1963
- 4041st Air Base Group, 1 September 1957
- 305th Combat Support Group, 1 June 1959
- 931st Air Refueling Group, 15 January 1970 – 1 July 1975; 1 July 1978 – 1 July 1987.

== Major units assigned ==
- 323d Fighter-Bomber Wing, 8 August 1955 – 1 September 1957
- 319th Fighter Interceptor Squadron, 1 November 1955 – 1 January 1959 (Air Defense Command)
- 305th Bombardment Wing (later 305th Air Refueling Wing), 1 June 1959 – 30 September 1994
- 434th Air Refueling Wing (previously 434th Special Operations Wing and 434th Tactical Fighter Wing), 15 January 1971 – Present

== Aircraft assigned (Strategic Air Command) ==
- Boeing B-47 Stratojet (bomber)
- Convair B-58 Hustler (supersonic bomber)
- Boeing KC-135 (air refueling tanker)
- Boeing EC-135 (LOOKING GLASS, post-attack SAC Airborne Command Post)

== Role and operations ==
The host wing for Grissom Air Reserve Base is the 434th Air Refueling Wing (434 ARW) of the Air Force Reserve Command (AFRC). As a result of previous post-Vietnam War base realignments and post-Cold War BRAC realignments, AFRC currently controls four former active duty Air Force Bases in the United States that have been re-designated as Air Reserve Bases (e.g., Grissom ARB, IN; Homestead ARB, FL; March ARB, CA; Westover ARB, MA).

Grissom ARB also hosts Army Reserve and Marine Corps Reserve units.

The base has a combined workforce consisting of both military personnel and civilians and ranked as the largest employer in Miami County and the third-largest employer in north-central Indiana in 2012. Grissom claims an economic impact of over $130 million per year, and is involved in community activities, like the Marine Corps Reserve's annual "Toys for Tots". The National Arbor Day Foundation designated the base as a "Tree City". In 2017, Grissom Air Reserve Base became home to the Green Knights Military Motorcycle Club, Chapter 109, an official chapter of the Green Knights International Military Motorcycle Club. The club promotes motorcycle safety for both military and civilian personnel and is open to all active, reserve, and guard military members, DoD Civilians, DoD Contractors, and Retirees.

== Based units ==
Flying and notable non-flying units based at Grissom Air Reserve Base.

Units marked GSU are Geographically Separate Units, which although based at Grissom are subordinate to a parent unit based at another location.

=== United States Air Force ===
Air Force Reserve Command (AFRC)

- Fourth Air Force
  - 434th Air Refueling Wing (Host Wing)
    - 434th Aerospace Medicine Squadron
    - 434th Operations Group
      - 72nd Air Refueling Squadron – KC-135R Stratotanker
      - 74th Air Refueling Squadron – KC-135R Stratotanker
      - 434th Operations Support Squadron
    - 434th Maintenance Group
      - 434th Aircraft Maintenance Squadron
      - 434th Maintenance Operations Squadron
      - 434th Maintenance Squadron
    - 434th Mission Support Group
      - 49th Aerial Port Squadron
      - 434th Civil Engineer Squadron
      - 434th Communications Squadron
      - 434th Force Support Squadron
      - 434th Logistics Readiness Squadron
      - 434th Operational Contracting Flight
      - 434th Security Forces Squadron

=== United States Marine Corps ===
US Marine Corps Reserve

- 4th Marine Logistics Group
  - Combat Logistics Regiment 45
    - Communications Company
      - Detachment 1 (GSU)

=== United States Army ===
US Army Reserve

- US Army Civil Affairs and Psychological Operations Command (Airborne)
  - 2nd Psychological Operations Group
    - 16th Psychological Operations Battalion
      - 316th Tactical Psychological Operations Company (GSU)
- 377th Sustainment Command
  - 310th Sustainment Command
    - 643rd Regional Support Group
      - 766th Transportation Battalion
        - 855th Quartermaster Company
          - Detachment 1 (GSU)
- 108th Training Command
  - 95th Training Division
    - 4th Brigade
      - 330th Regiment
        - 1st Battalion (GSU)

== Environmental problems ==
In 2015, groundwater at about 20 feet below the surface was found to be contaminated with perfluorinated compounds (PFCs) at two former fire-training areas. PFCs are found in fire-suppressing foam used to extinguish petroleum-driven aircraft fires. The drinking-water wells near the base go much deeper, at 150 to 180 feet below the surface. At around 14 other sites on or near the base pollutants, like vinyl chloride, in soil or water are also being investigated. In September 2015, four water wells closest to the former firefighter training areas tested negative for PFC's as did the in-flow and out-flow points at the nearby city of Peru's municipal water treatment plant with levels below the EPA health advisory limits.

The Air Force has been testing 82 former and active installations nationwide for PFC's. In 2015, PFCs were found in groundwater at the former Naval Air Station Brunswick and well water at Pease Air National Guard Base.

== Geography ==
Grissom Air Reserve Base is located at 40°40′15″N 86°09′17″W, about 12 miles (19 km) north of Kokomo in Cass and Miami counties in Indiana. The nearby city of Peru is about 70 miles north of Indianapolis.

The base is listed by the United States Census Bureau as the "Grissom AFB" census-designated place (CDP), with an area of 5.0 square miles (12.9 km^{2}), all land. As of the 2020 census, the population living on the base was 3,009, down from 5,537 in 2010.

== Demographics ==
Historical population
Census	Pop.	Note	%±
1970	4,963		—
1980	4,676		−5.8%
1990	4,271		−8.7%
2000	1,652		−61.3%
2010	5,537		235.2%
2020	3,009		−45.7%
U.S. Decennial Census

As of the census of 2000, there were 1,652 people, 581 households, and 431 families residing in the CDP. The population density was 151.9 people/km^{2} (393 people/mi^{2}). There were 1,091 housing units at an average density of 100.3 units/km^{2} (260 units/mi^{2}). The racial makeup of the CDP was 86.7% White, 7.6% African American, 0.5% Native American, 0.7% Asian, 0.1% Pacific Islander, 1.5% from other races, and 3.0% from two or more races. Hispanic or Latino of any race were 3.2% of the population.

There were 581 households, out of which 51.3% had children under the age of 18 living with them, 54.7% were married couples living together, 12.6% had a female householder with no husband present, and 25.8% were non-families. 19.1% of all households were made up of individuals, and 1.4% had someone living alone who was 65 years of age or older. The average household size was 2.84 and the average family size was 3.27.

In the CDP the population was spread out, with 36.4% under the age of 18, 9.1% from 18 to 24, 39.6% from 25 to 44, 12.8% from 45 to 64, and 2.1% who were 65 years of age or older. The median age was 27 years. For every 100 females there were 100.7 males. For every 100 females age 18 and over, there were 100.8 males.

The median income for a household in the CDP was $45,000, and the median income for a family was $44,939. Males had a median income of $34,286 versus $21,447 for females. The per capita income for the CDP was $15,869. About 8.6% of families and 8.9% of the population were below the poverty line, including 13.5% of those under age 18 and none of those age 65 or over.

For the period 2007–2011, the estimated median annual income for a household in the CDP was $42,105, and the median income for a family was $42,857. Males had a median income of $35,819 versus $27,857 for females. The per capita income for the CDP was $15,423. About 19.3% of families and 16.5% of the population were below the poverty line, including 23.7% of those under age 18 and none of those age 65 or over.

== In popular culture ==
Grissom appears in the video game Tom Clancy's EndWar as a possible battlefield.

Grissom is also mentioned in the movie Transformers: Dark of the Moon as a base used before the attack on Chicago.

Grissom is also mentioned in "Flight of the Intruder"

== See also ==
- Grissom Air Museum
- List of United States Air Force Aerospace Defense Command Interceptor Squadrons

== Notes ==
Citations

== Bibliography ==
- This article incorporates public domain material from the Air Force Historical Research Agency
- This article incorporates public domain material from Grissom Air Reserve Base. United States Air Force.
- Bragg, Captain K.B. Technical Report and Project History Contract NOy 5475. United States Navy.
- "GRISSOM AIR FORCE BASE, BUILDING NO. 143 – Grissom Air Force Base, Water Survival Training Pool" (PDF). National Park Service U.S. Department of the Interior.
- "Narrative Summaries of Accidents Involving U.S. Nuclear Weapons 1950–1980" (PDF). Department of Defense. April 1981.
- Rademacher, Steven E., Major, USAF, BSC; Renaghan, Brian (August 2000). "Remedial Action and Final Radiological Status, 1964 B-58 Accident Site, Grissom Air Reserve Base, Bunker Hill, Indiana" (PDF). Air Force Institute for Environment, Safety and Occupational Health Risk Analysis. Archived (PDF) from the original on 10 July 2020. "In 1999, AFIERA performed a radiological characterization of the site [...confirming] that a small area of the site investigated contains depleted uranium contamination. [...The plan includes] details on 1) pre-remediation site survey, 2) soil removal activities, 3) remedial action support surveys 4) final status soil sampling and 5) soil backfill of the remediation area."
- "Selected Economic Characteristics: 2007–2011 American Community Survey 5-Year Estimates (DP03): Grissom AFB CDP, Indiana". U.S. Census Bureau, American Factfinder.
- Ubisoft (2008). "Locations". Ubisoft.
- Secretary of the Air Force Public Affairs (29 October 2015). "Seymour-Johnson chosen for first Reserve-led KC-46A basing". Air Force Reserve Command. Archived from the original on 26 January 2016.
- Gerber, Carson (25 August 2015a). "Water samples reveal polluted sites near Grissom Air Reserve Base". Kokomo Tribune (IN).
- Gerber, Carson (21 June 2015b). "EPA launches investigation into polluted groundwater beneath city". Kokomo Tribune (IN).
- "Grissom officials: Well tests show no chemical pollution". LIN Television Corporation. Associated Press. 19 September 2015.
- "US Gazetteer files: 2010, 2000, and 1990". United States Census Bureau. 12 February 2011.
- "Geographic Identifiers: 2010 Demographic Profile Data (G001): Grissom AFB CDP, Indiana". U.S. Census Bureau, American Factfinder.
- "U.S. Census website". United States Census Bureau.
