= Old Tom Morris Award =

American annual golf award

The Old Tom Morris Award is the Golf Course Superintendents Association of America's most prestigious honor. It is presented each year to an individual who "through a continuing lifetime commitment to the game of golf has helped to mold the welfare of the game in a manner and style exemplified by Old Tom Morris."

Morris (1821–1908) was greenskeeper and golf professional at the St Andrews Links Trust Golf Club of St. Andrews, Scotland; a four-time winner of The Open Championship (1861, 1862, 1864 and 1867); and ranked as one of the top links designers of the 19th century.

The recipient of this award is determined by the GCSAA Board of Directors. The award is presented annually at the GCSAA Conference and Trade Show.

== Winners ==
- 1983 Arnold Palmer
- 1984 Bob Hope
- 1985 Gerald Ford
- 1986 Patty Berg
- 1987 Robert Trent Jones
- 1988 Gene Sarazen
- 1989 Juan "Chi-Chi" Rodríguez
- 1990 Sherwood A. Moore, CGCS
- 1991 William C. Campbell
- 1992 Tom Watson
- 1993 Dinah Shore
- 1994 Byron Nelson
- 1995 James R. Watson, Ph.D.
- 1996 Tom Fazio
- 1997 Ben Crenshaw
- 1998 Ken Venturi
- 1999 Jaime Ortiz-Patiño
- 2000 Nancy Lopez
- 2001 Tim Finchem
- 2002 Walter Woods, Esq.
- 2003 Pete Dye
- 2004 Rees Jones
- 2005 Jack Nicklaus
- 2006 Joseph M. Duich, Ph.D.
- 2007 Charlie Sifford
- 2008 Greg Norman
- 2009 Col. John Morley
- 2010 Judy Rankin
- 2011 Nick Price
- 2012 Peter Jacobsen
- 2013 Michael Hurdzan
- 2014 Annika Sorenstam
- 2015 Dan Jenkins
- 2016 Herbert Kohler Jr.
- 2017 Paul R. Latshaw
- 2018 Ernie Els
- 2019 Powell family
- 2020 Gary Player
- 2021 Jim Nantz
- 2022 Vince Gill
- 2023 Johnny Morris
- 2024 Dottie Pepper
- 2025 Ozzie Smith
