= Erin Hills =

Golf course in Wisconsin, United States

- Location within the United States Location within Wisconsin
- 43.245°N 88.395°W

Club information
- Location: Erin, Wisconsin, U.S.
- Elevation: 1,000 feet (300 m)
- Established: 2006, 20 years ago
- Type: Public
- Owner: Andrew Ziegler
- Total holes: 18
- Tournaments: U.S. Open (2017), U.S. Amateur (2011)
- Greens: Bentgrass
- Fairways: Fine fescue
- Website: erinhills.com
- Designed by: Michael Hurdzan, Dana Fry, Ron Whitten (2006) Dana Fry & Jason Straka (2015 renovation)
- Par: 72
- Length: 7,772 yards (7,107 m)
- Course rating: 78.1
- Slope rating: 146

Erin Hills is a golf course in the north central United States, located in Erin, Wisconsin, in Washington County, 35 miles (55 km) northwest of Milwaukee. The course officially opened in 2006. It hosted the 117th U.S. Open in 2017. The announcement was made in 2010. It was the first USGA regular men's event ever awarded to a course owned by an individual. The 2011 U.S. Amateur, won by Kelly Kraft, was also held at Erin Hills.

== History ==
Erin Hills was built by Wisconsin developer Bob Lang, who used his own money to fund the course. Designers included Dr. Michael John Hurdzan and his business partner Dana Fry, and Ron Whitten. Determined to bring the U.S. Open to Erin Hills and at the suggestion of USGA officials, Lang made many changes to the layout of the course, dramatically changing several holes. Lang's ultimate goal of bringing the U.S. Open forced him to sell the course, due to financial difficulties.

Andrew Ziegler purchased the course in 2009; as part of his commitment to upgrading the conditioning of the golf course, he said that Erin Hills would be operated on a "walking-only" basis starting in 2010. Unlike most modern courses, Erin Hills was not outfitted with paved cart paths. The average elevation of the course is approximately 1,000 feet (300 m) above sea level, about 400 feet (120 m) higher than Lake Michigan to the east.

== Grounds ==
The course includes a manor home specifically built as a hotel that includes a pub, and a refurbished caddie barn. The grounds have been upgraded to include cottages for overnight stay. About four miles (6.5 km) to the east on higher ground is the landmark Holy Hill shrine, visible from the course.

== Major tournaments hosted ==
| Year | Tournament | Winner |
|---|---|---|
| 2008 | U.S. Women's Amateur Public Links | Tiffany Joh |
| 2011 | U.S. Amateur | Kelly Kraft |
| 2017 | U.S. Open | Brooks Koepka |
| 2022 | U.S. Mid-Amateur | Matthew McClean |
| 2025 | U.S. Women's Open | Maja Stark |

== Scorecard ==
Erin Hills
| Tee | Rating/Slope | 1 | 2 | 3 | 4 | 5 | 6 | 7 | 8 | 9 | Out | 10 | 11 | 12 | 13 | 14 | 15 | 16 | 17 | 18 | In | Total |
| Black | 78.1 / 146 | 552 | 361 | 476 | 445 | 462 | 237 | 607 | 492 | 163 | 3795 | 504 | 423 | 464 | 212 | 613 | 370 | 247 | 481 | 663 | 3977 | 7772 |
| Blue | 75.4 / 141 | 536 | 358 | 433 | 437 | 439 | 208 | 576 | 441 | 160 | 3588 | 478 | 406 | 434 | 193 | 594 | 359 | 221 | 447 | 637 | 3769 | 7357 |
| Green | 73.5 / 135 | 516 | 336 | 402 | 395 | 403 | 188 | 551 | 415 | 147 | 3353 | 449 | 355 | 396 | 170 | 507 | 350 | 193 | 434 | 622 | 3476 | 6829 |
| Green/White | 72.2 / 132 | 516 | 318 | 402 | 387 | 403 | 176 | 503 | 363 | 142 | 3210 | 421 | 355 | 382 | 162 | 507 | 350 | 159 | 434 | 557 | 3327 | 6537 |
| White | 70.8 / 128 | 485 | 318 | 366 | 387 | 359 | 176 | 503 | 363 | 142 | 3099 | 421 | 315 | 382 | 162 | 473 | 299 | 159 | 385 | 557 | 3153 | 6252 |
| White/Gold | 68.0 / 122 | 485 | 318 | 366 | 280 | 359 | 176 | 389 | 363 | 138 | 2874 | 298 | 315 | 307 | 152 | 438 | 299 | 159 | 322 | 506 | 2796 | 5670 |
| SI | Men's | 3 | 13 | 7 | 11 | 9 | 15 | 1 | 5 | 17 | | 4 | 14 | 10 | 18 | 2 | 12 | 16 | 8 | 6 |
| Par | | 5 | 4 | 4 | 4 | 4 | 3 | 5 | 4 | 3 | 36 | 4 | 4 | 4 | 3 | 5 | 4 | 3 | 4 | 5 | 36 | 72 |
| SI | Women's | 3 | 11 | 7 | 9 | 5 | 17 | 1 | 13 | 15 | | 4 | 12 | 8 | 18 | 2 | 10 | 16 | 14 | 6 |
| White | 75.7 / 131 | 485 | 318 | 366 | 387 | 359 | 176 | 503 | 363 | 142 | 3099 | 421 | 315 | 382 | 162 | 473 | 299 | 159 | 385 | 557 | 3153 | 6252 |
| White/Gold | 72.3 / 124 | 485 | 318 | 366 | 280 | 359 | 176 | 389 | 363 | 138 | 2874 | 298 | 315 | 307 | 152 | 438 | 299 | 159 | 322 | 506 | 2796 | 5670 |
| Gold | 69.2 / 118 | 386 | 223 | 299 | 280 | 320 | 124 | 389 | 239 | 138 | 2398 | 298 | 277 | 307 | 152 | 438 | 252 | 128 | 322 | 506 | 2680 | 5078 |
