= 2nd Psychological Operations Group =

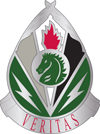
- 2nd PSYOP Group Distinctive Unit Insignia
- Active: 29 October 1965 – 13 September 1972; 30 October 1975 – present
- Country: United States
- Branch: United States Army
- Type: U.S. Army Reserve
- Role: PSYOP
- Part of: U.S. Army Civil Affairs and Psychological Operations Command (USACAPOC)

Insignia
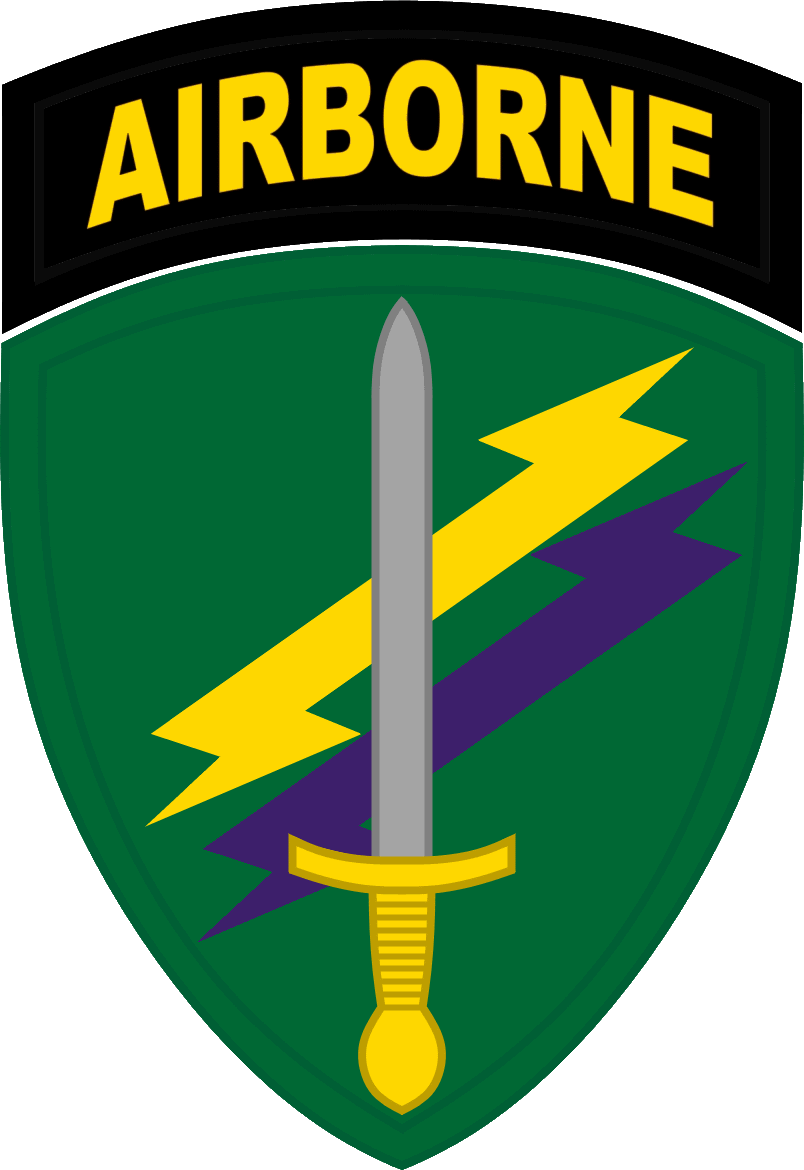
- USACAPOC Shoulder Sleeve Insignia worn by all subordinate units

The 2nd Psychological Operations Group is a psychological operations (PSYOP) unit of the United States Army Reserve.

Constituted 29 October 1965 in the Regular Army as the 2nd Psychological Operations Group. Activated 20 December 1965 at Fort Bragg, North Carolina. Inactivated 13 September 1972 at Fort Bragg, North Carolina. Redesignated 30 October 1975 as Headquarters and Headquarters Detachment, 2nd Psychological Operations Group; concurrently withdrawn from the Regular Army, allotted to the Army Reserve, and activated at Twinsburg, Ohio. Reorganized and redesignated 18 September 1990 as Headquarters and Headquarters Company, 2nd Psychological Operations Group.

Battalion	Distinctive Unit Insignia	History
11th Psychological Operations Battalion		11th Psychological Operations Battalion, in Upper Marlboro (MD) (formerly designated the 7th Psychological Operations Battalion); awarded the Army Meritorious Unit Citation (Vietnam 1967–68), Navy Unit Commendation (Vietnam 1967–68), Republic of Vietnam Cross of Gallantry with Palm (Vietnam 1971), Republic of Vietnam Civil Action Honor Medal First Class (Vietnam 1967–70), and the Army Superior Unit Award (Bosnia 1997) Deployed to Iraq in 2004 during the second year of Operation Iraqi Freedom.: 305th Tactical Psychological Operations Company, at Joint Expeditionary Base Fort Story (VA); Deployed to Iraq in 2003 during the first year of Operation Iraqi Freedom; awarded the Navy Presidential Unit Citation: 312th Tactical Psychological Operations Company, in Upper Marlboro (MD); Served in the European Theater of Operations as the 12th Loudspeaker Company during World War II. Deployed to Iraq in 2003 during the first year of Operation Iraqi Freedom; awarded the Navy Presidential Unit Citation: 351st Psychological Operations Company, at Fort Totten (NY); 360th Psychological Operations Company, in Jersey City (NJ)
13th Psychological Operations Battalion		13th Psychological Operations Battalion, in Arden Hills (MN) Deployed to Iraq in 2003 in support of Operation Iraqi Freedom. Deployed to Afghanistan in 2004 during the third year of Operation Enduring Freedom. Deployed to Afghanistan in 2007 during the sixth year of Operation Enduring Freedom. Deployed to Iraq in January 2007 in support of Operation Iraqi Freedom.: 319th Tactical Psychological Operations Company, in Arden Hills (MN); 321st Tactical Psychological Operations Company, in Grand Rapids (MI); 339th Tactical Psychological Operations Company, in Arden Hills (MN); 350th Tactical Psychological Operations Company, in Twinsburg (OH); Deployed to Iraq in 2004 during the third year of Operation Iraqi Freedom (OIF3).
15th Psychological Operations Battalion		15th Psychological Operations Battalion, in Cincinnati (OH) Deployed to Iraq in 2004 during the third year of Operation Iraqi Freedom (OIF3). Deployed to Iraq in 2006 during the fourth year of Operation Iraqi Freedom (OIF06-08).: 310th Tactical Psychological Operations Company (Airborne), at Fort Gillem (GA); 325th Tactical Psychological Operations Company (Airborne), in Nashville (TN); 340th Tactical Psychological Operations Company (Airborne), in Garner (NC); 346th Tactical Psychological Operations Company (Tactical) (Airborne), in Whitehall (OH); Deployed to Iraq in 2003 during the first year of Operation Iraqi Freedom (OIF1).
16th Psychological Operations Battalion		16th Psychological Operations Battalion, in Lake Forest (IL) Constituted 30 December 1954 in the Army Reserve as Headquarters and Headquarters Company, 305th Radio Broadcasting and Leaflet Battalion and assigned to the Fifth United States Army. Activated 17 January 1955 at Chicago, Illinois. Relocated to Evanston, Illinois, on 1 June 1957. Reorganized and redesignated 1 June 1960 as Headquarters and Headquarters Company, 305th Psychological Operations Battalion. Relocated to Chicago on 1 March 1963. Reorganized and redesignated 31 December 1965 as the 305th Psychological Operations Battalion. Reorganized and redesignated 16 June 1996 as Headquarters and Headquarters Company, 16th Psychological Operations Battalion.: 303rd Tactical Psychological Operations Company, in Coraopolis (PA); 316th Tactical Psychological Operations Company, at Grissom Air Reserve Base (IN); 338th Tactical Psychological Operations Company, at Fort Jackson (SC); 393rd Tactical Psychological Operations Company, in Arlington Heights (IL); Received Army Meritorious Unit Citations for Korea 1951–53 and Pacific Area 1968–70; Received Republic of Korea Presidential Unit Citation for Korea 1951–53. Deployed to Iraq in 2006 during the fourth year of Operation Iraqi Freedom (OIF06-08).
