= Orangeburg pipe =

Type of pipe made from tar paper

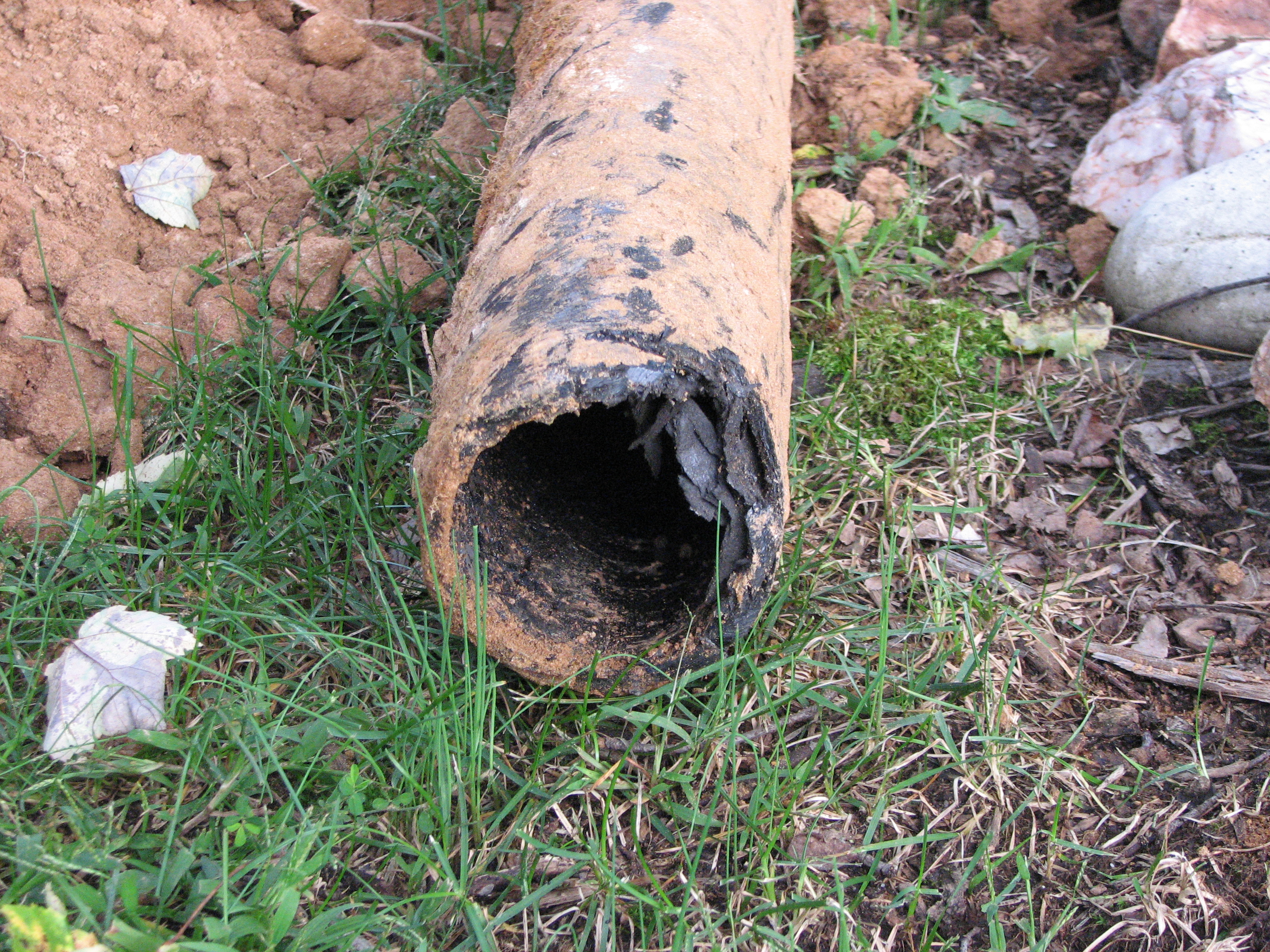
Orangeburg pipe, showing its characteristic delamination in layers of compressed oil tar pitch-impregnated ground wood fibers

Orangeburg pipe (also known as "fiber conduit", "bituminous fiber pipe" or "Bermico" or "sand pipe") is bituminized fiber pipe used in the United States. It is made from layers of ground wood pulp fibers and asbestos fibres compressed with and bound by a water resistant adhesive then impregnated with liquefied coal tar pitch. It was used from the 1860s through the 1970s, when it was replaced by PVC and ABS pipe for drain-waste-vent (DWV) applications. The name comes from Orangeburg, New York, the town in which most Orangeburg pipe was manufactured, largely by the Fiber Conduit Company. It changed its name to the Orangeburg Manufacturing Company in 1948.

== History ==
The first known use of any fiber pipe was in an experimental water delivery line in the Boston, Massachusetts, area. The pipeline, finished in 1867, measured 1.5 miles in length and was in use through 1927. Bituminized pipe was not in widespread commercial use until the late 19th century when it was used exclusively as electrical conduit.

In 1893, Stephen Bradley Sr. founded the Fiber Conduit Company in Orangeburg, New York. Bradley's neighboring Union Electric Company power plants used exhaust steam from their generators to dry lengths of fiber conduit before they were sealed with liquified coal tar pitch. In turn, the Fiber Conduit Company's conduits were used to run electrical wiring throughout numerous newly constructed buildings across the country for the next forty years. Bradley, along with several competitors, installed miles of the fiber electrical conduit in skyscrapers, such as the Empire State Building.

The early 1900s brought tremendous expansion of the telephone, telegraph and electrical industries, along with subway construction along the eastern seaboard. This expansion in installation of electrical and telecommunications wiring within buildings and subway tunnels brought with it a rising demand for fiber conduit to run it in. In addition, fiber conduit was increasingly being used for underground ducting for distributing wires under streets and roads, particularly where they were being excavated to build subways, as well as along railroads.

Fiber was next adopted by the booming oil industry to pump salt waste-water from drilling sites to treatment and disposal areas. During what ended up being trial usage of the Fiber Conduit Co.'s "Alkacid" line it was quickly discovered that while long-lived and incredibly durable in normal drainage operations, such pipe easily ruptured under pressure. The industry then shifted to more durable asbestos cement pipe.

While a variety of companies competed with Fiber Conduit Co., including American (East Chicago, Indiana), J–M Fibre Conduit (Lockport, New York), Bermico (Brown Co. of Berlin, New Hampshire), and American (Fulton, New York), it was by far and away the industry leader in bituminized fiber conduit piping throughout the early 20th century and beyond. With cast iron in short supply during World War II demand sharply increased with the need for electrical conduit for use in new airfields and military bases. In 1948, the name of the Fiber Conduit Company was changed to the Orangeburg Manufacturing Company. During the postwar housing boom, the demand for cheap housing materials was at an all-time high and available drainage materials were scarce. Orangeburg Manufacturing produced a thicker-walled centrifugally-laminated pipe, sturdier for sewer and drain uses, which became known simply as "Orangeburg pipe".

So rapidly did PVC and ABS overtake bituminized pipe in the 1970s that the Orangeburg Pipe Company closed by 1974. Countless thousands of miles of decaying bituminized pipe remain in use throughout the U.S., slowly being replaced by modern alternatives.

== Use ==
Orangeburg pipe was made of wood pulp sealed with liquified coal tar pitch in inside diameters from 2 inches to 18 inches, with a perforated version for leach fields. Joints were made of the same material, and, because of the residual stickiness of the coal tar, were sealed without adhesives. Orangeburg was inexpensive, lightweight, albeit brittle, and soft enough to be cut with a handsaw.

Orangeburg was a low cost alternative to metal for sewer lines in particular. Lack of strength causes pipes made of Orangeburg to fail more frequently than pipes made with other materials. The useful life for an Orangeburg pipe is about 50 years under ideal conditions, but has been known to fail in as little as 10 years. It has been taken off the list of acceptable materials by most building codes.
