= Golf course superintendent =

A golf course superintendent is a person who professionally manages the labor, time, materials and financial resources needed to care for the turfgrass and landscaped grounds on a golf course. Golf course superintendents have also been referred to as greenskeepers and turf managers. Golf course superintendents are concerned with the environmental health of the golf course, the sporting needs of the players and the financial sustainability of the golf club or country club for which they work. Golf course superintendents communicate the status of the grounds and maintenance resources to members of the club's management, owners or board of directors, green chairs and committees, golfers, vendors, suppliers, golf professionals, golf course architects and others in the golf industry.

Golf course superintendents monitor the natural weather patterns, environment and other influences that affect the playing areas and landscapes with which golfers interact. Golf course superintendents monitor the health of the golf course environment through study, diagnosis, and treatment of disease and injury to the golf course's turfgrass fairways, tees and greens areas, as well as bunkers, areas of water hazard, naturalized areas and trees. Their management of the course is accomplished through a knowledge of biology, chemistry, plant pathology, and entomology. In the United States, golf course superintendents can be certified by the Golf Course Superintendents Association of America (GCSAA).

== Job responsibilities ==
Golf course superintendents maintain a course's turfgrass, which is considered to be a manufactured product because it is specifically planted, raised and maintained to provide players with a surface on which to play golf. There is a science-based process behind the turfgrass they produce which involves various steps and stages throughout the year.

The maintenance of the turfgrass throughout the year requires sufficient education on the distinction between the natural state and preferred state of golf course greenery. Training in fertilizers and herbicides are necessary to understanding the dynamic between a natural environment and one that is conducive to sustaining hundreds of thousands of rounds of golf per year. Many superintendents will go to secondary education preparing them for a certification from the GCSAA, the Golf Course Supererintendents Association of America.

The PGA Tour sponsors a movement every year to remind golfers around the world to thank their local golf course superintendent for all the hard work they put in behind the scenes.

== Sources ==
1. Golf Course Superintendents Association of America.
2. United States Golf Association.

3. North Carolina State University Turf Files Glossary.
4. The North Carolina Agricultural Extension Service, INSECT and other PESTS associated with TURF.
5. New England Greenkeepr. 6. Rocky Mountain GCSA.
