= Greenskeeper =

Person who cares for a golf course

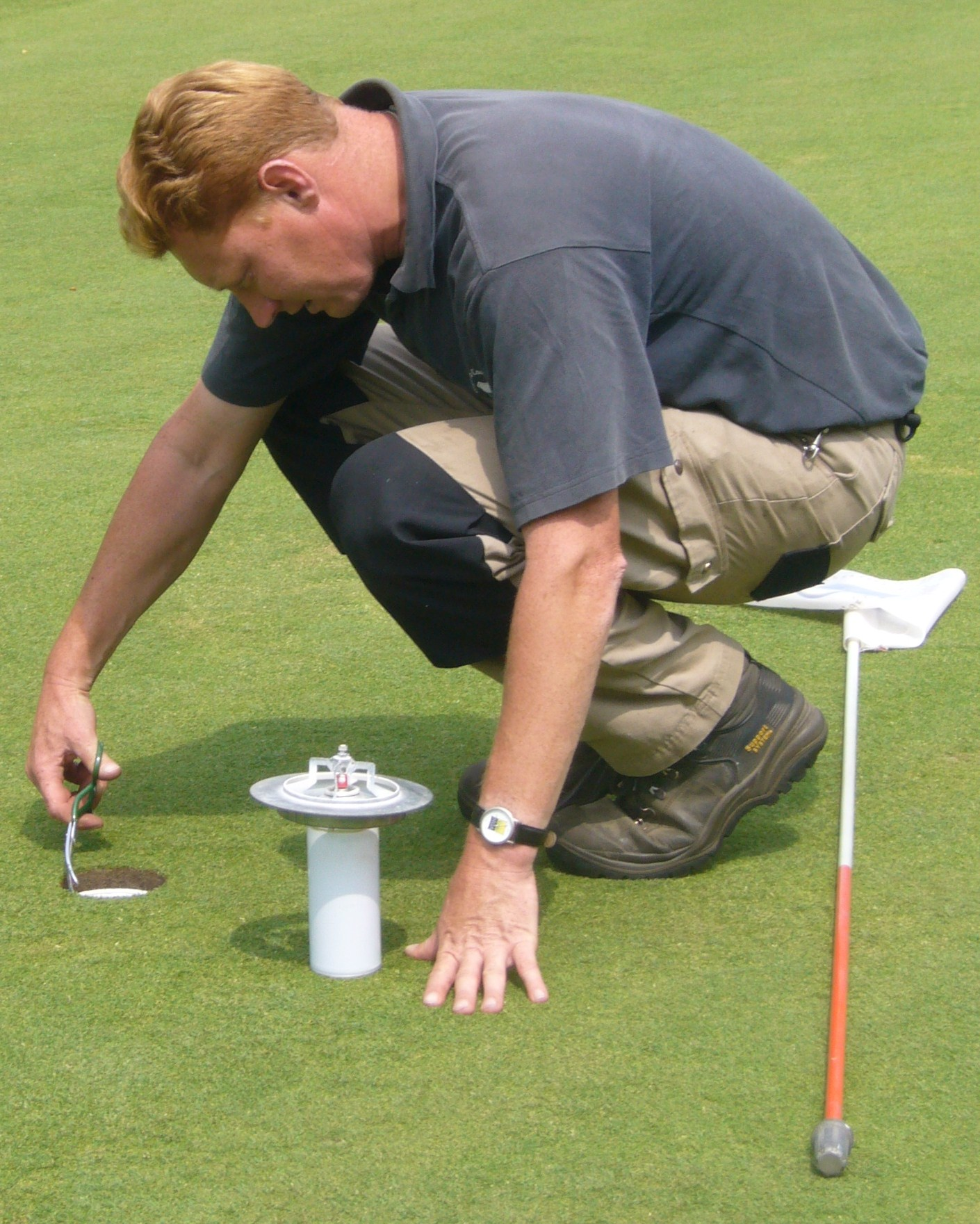
A greenskeeper cuts a hole

A greenskeeper is a person responsible for the upkeep of a golf course. Their duties include all horticultural practices, as well as the setting of flag-sticks and marking of hazards. Other responsibilities typically include raking bunkers, watering plants, repairing divots, trimming tee boxes, and mowing the course. Greenskeepers often work under the direction of a golf course superintendent.

== Work and duties ==
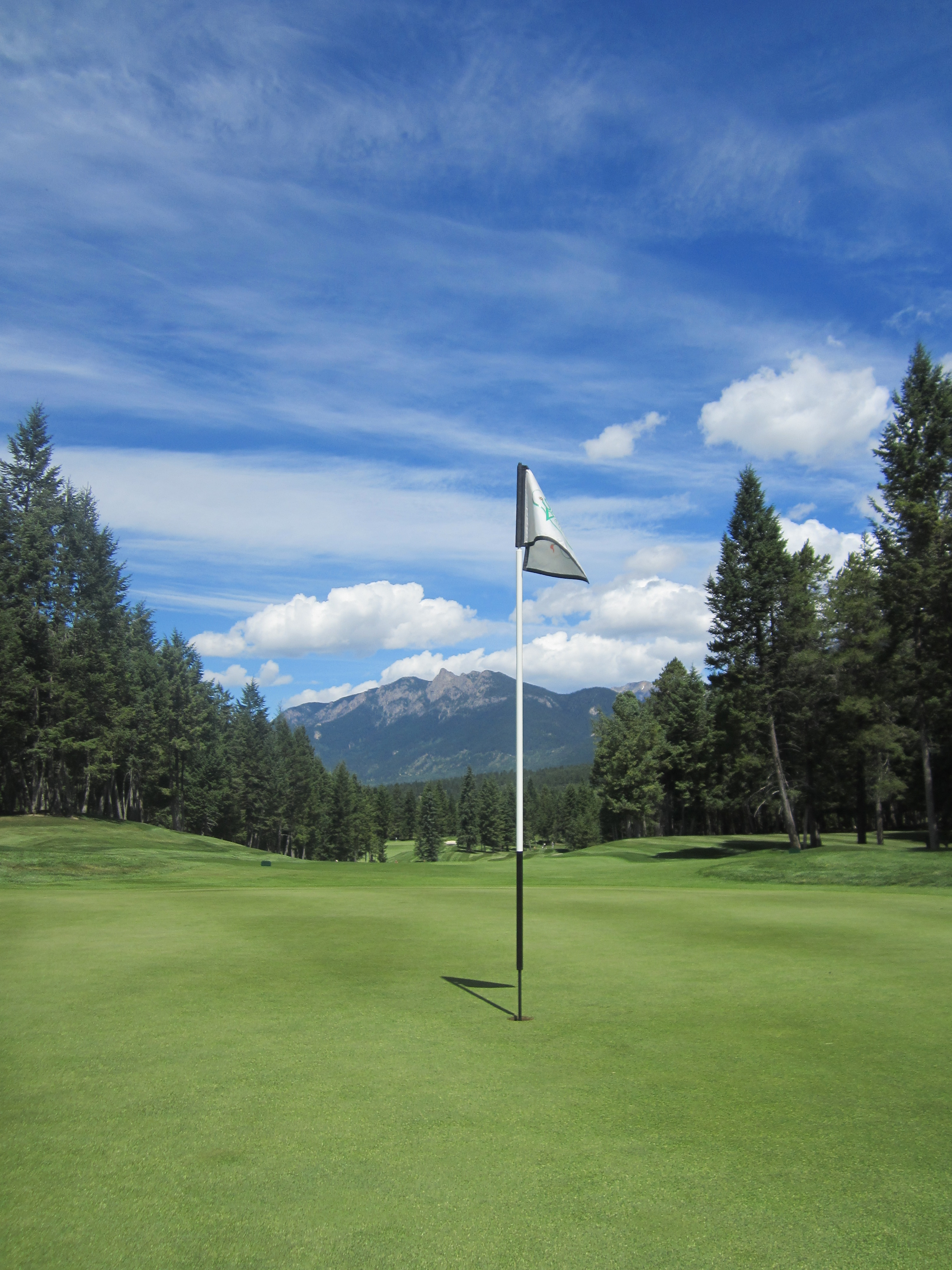
A flag-stick

=== Setting flag-sticks ===
Greenskeepers set the flag-sticks and tee markers, distinguishing their role from that of other groundskeepers and horticulturists. Tee markers distinguish the line from which players tee off or strike the golf ball. Flag-sticks mark the location of the hole for which the players are aiming.

The distance between the tee marker and flag-stick affects difficulty and gameplay. Almost every golf course is measured and rated according to distance, often measured in yardage. It is the greenskeeper's responsibility to keep the cumulative yardage for daily play close to the rating for the course; guidelines are not exact and the movement of flag-sticks is largely left to the greenskeeper's discretion.

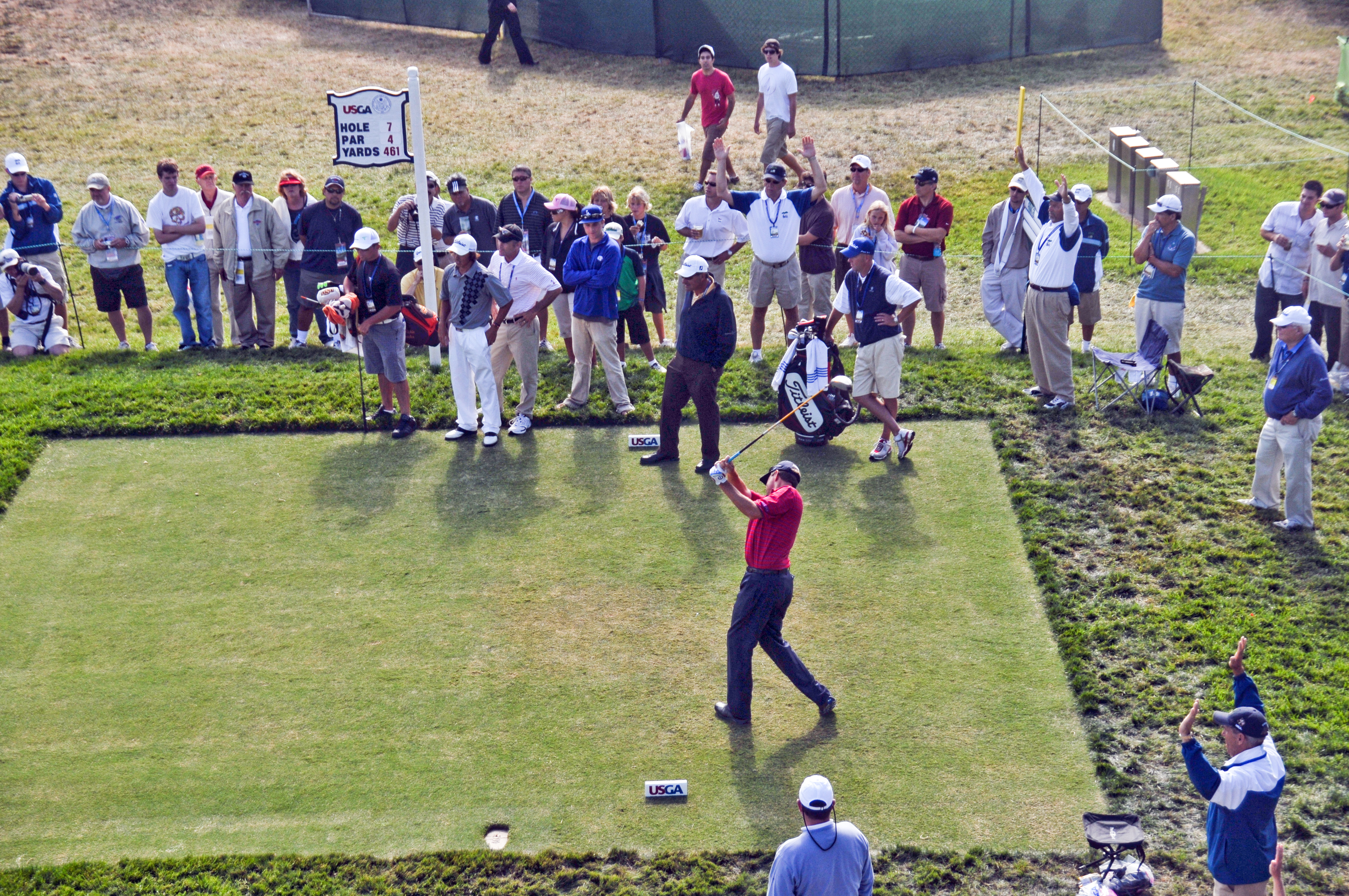
A tee box at the 2008 U.S. Open

In order to place a flag-stick, greenskeepers use a cup-cutting tool. This tool is specifically designed to preserve the soil and turf, which is immediately used to fill and repair the previous hole. Once the new hole is cut, a cup-setter tool is used to place the top of the cup about 1 inch (25 mm) below the green's surface. Due to wear and tear, flag-sticks need to be frequently moved. At heavily-trafficked courses and courses hosting multi-day professional tournaments, holes are almost always moved daily. To minimize the probability of recently-repaired holes affecting play, new flag-stick locations are at least 12 to 20 feet (3.7 to 6.1 meters) from the previous location, if not the previous two or three locations where feasible.

=== Monitoring green speed ===
Greenskeepers measure the speed of golf greens with a stimpmeter, a device that measures how fast a green allows the golf ball to travel. The stimpmeter is not used to compare one facility with another; many factors, including design, undulation, and grass type, affect green speed. A greenskeeper can increase the speed of the green by mowing the grass shorter, mowing more than once in multiple directions, using a lightweight roller, or topdressing the green with a small amount of fine sand to alter the putting surface.

== See also ==
- Turf management
