= 354th Civil Affairs Brigade =

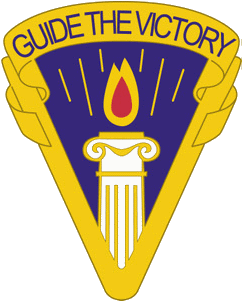
- 354th Civil Affairs Brigade Distinctive Unit Insignia
- Active: 1966-present
- Country: United States
- Branch: United States Army Reserve
- Role: Civil Affairs
- Size: Brigade
- Part of: 352nd Civil Affairs Command of the U.S. Army Civil Affairs and Psychological Operations Command
- Garrison/HQ: White Plains, Maryland
- Motto: Guide the Victory
- Website: https://www.facebook.com/354CivilAffairs/

Commanders
- Current commander: Col. Christopher Schond

Insignia
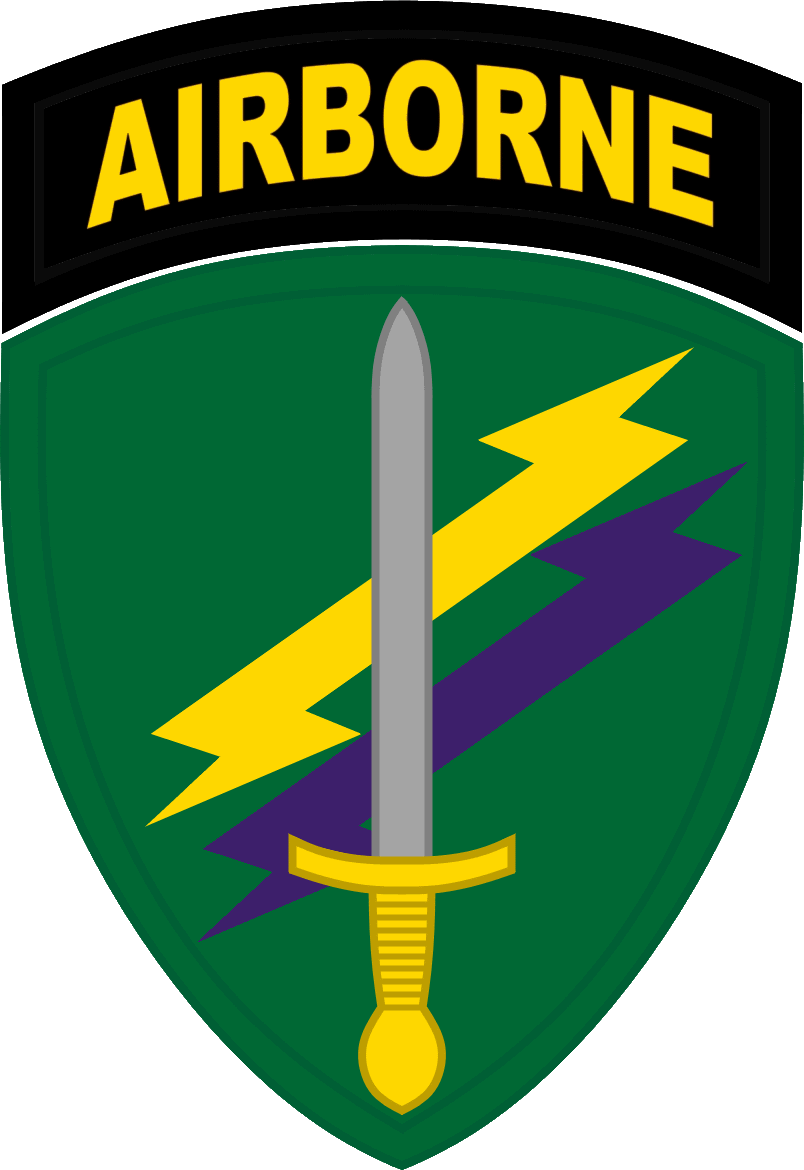
- USACAPOC Shoulder Sleeve Insignia, worn by the 354th Civil Affairs Brigade and all other subordinate USACAPOC units

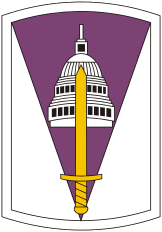
- Former shoulder sleeve insignia of the 354th Civil Affairs Brigade

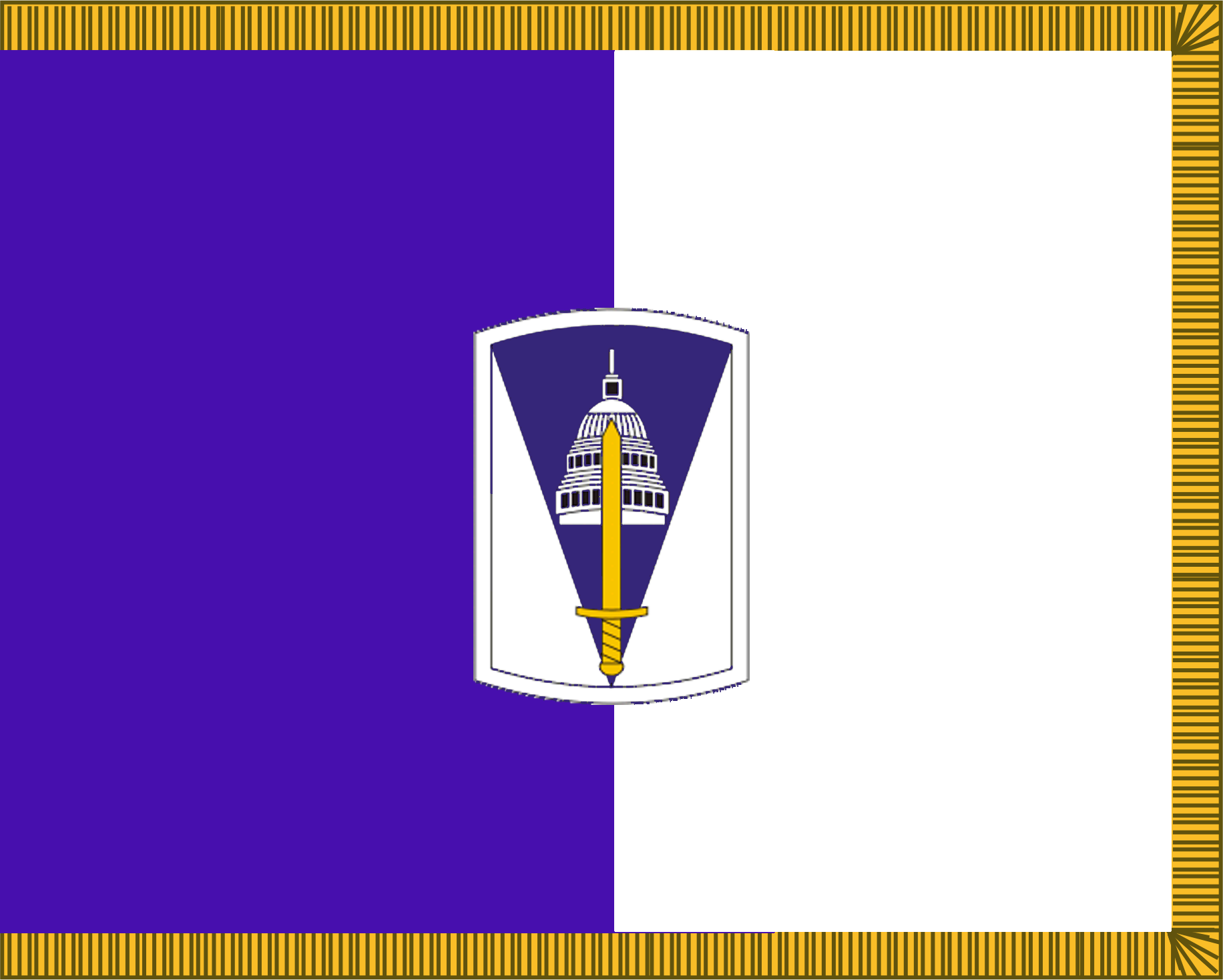
- 354th Civil Affairs Brigade Flag

The 354th Civil Affairs Brigade is a unit in the US Army Reserve since 1966. The unit was originally the 354th Civil Affairs Area in Riverdale, Maryland. In 1975 it was redesignated the 354th Civil Affairs Brigade.

In 1990-91 the unit was sent to Kuwait for Operation Desert Storm earning campaign streamers for Liberation and Defense of Kuwait and the Cease-Fire. In 2003 and again in 2009 (Baghdad) the unit was deployed in support of the Global War on Terror earning a streamer of the same name.

== Organization ==
The brigade is a subordinate unit of the 352nd Civil Affairs Command. As of January 2026 the brigade consists of the following units:

- 354th Civil Affairs Brigade, in White Plains (MD)
  - Headquarters and Headquarters Company, in White Plains (MD)
  - 414th Civil Affairs Battalion, in Southfield (MI)
  - 422nd Civil Affairs Battalion, in McLeansville (NC)
  - 437th Civil Affairs Battalion, at Joint Expeditionary Base Fort Story (VA)
  - 489th Civil Affairs Battalion, in Knoxville (TN)

Each Civil Affairs Battalion consists of a Headquarters and Headquarters Company and four civil affairs companies.
