= Guy Sands-Pingot =

United States general

Guy L. Sands-Pingot
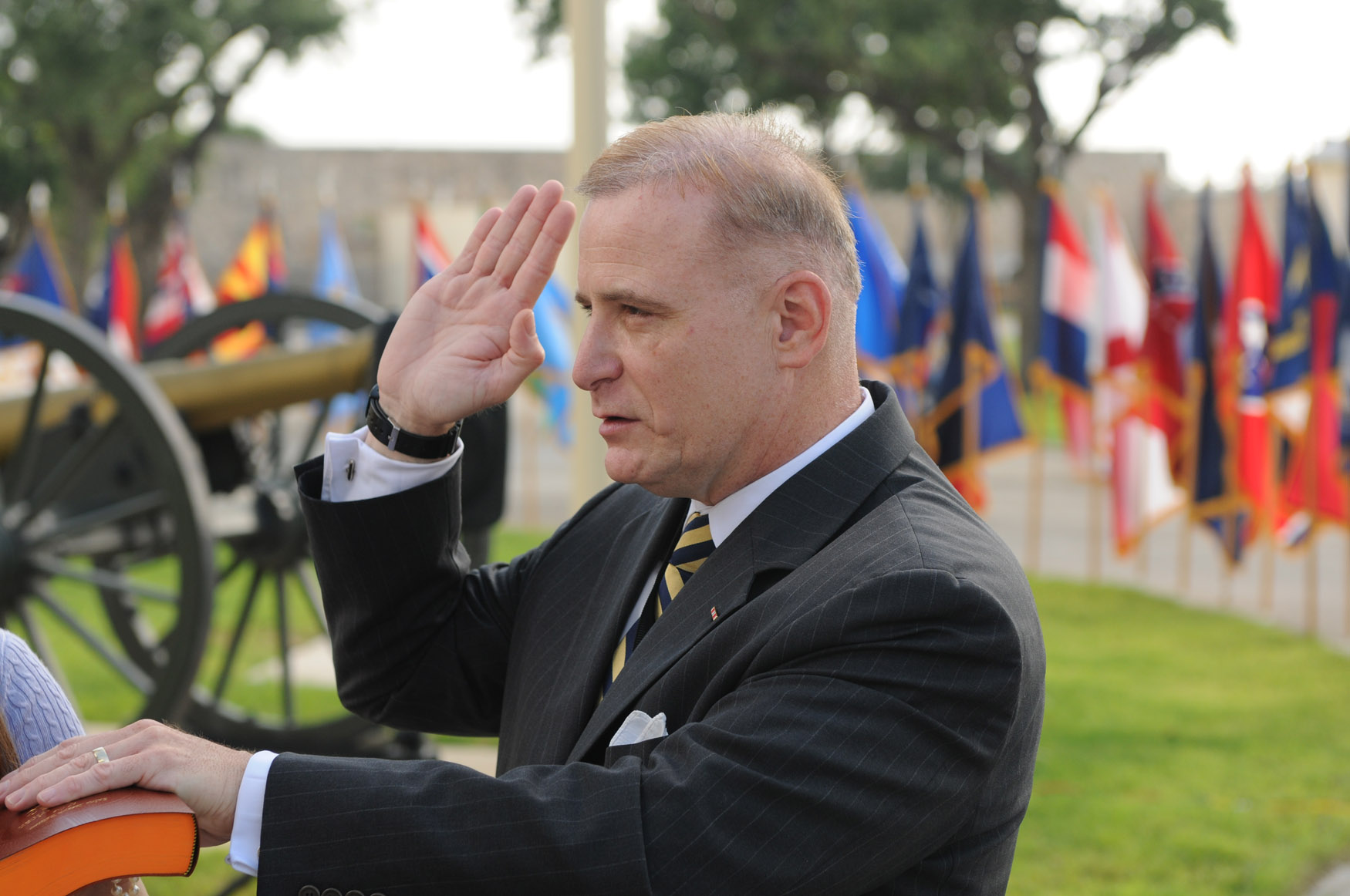
- Born: 1957 (age 68–69)
- Military career
- Allegiance: United States of America
- Branch: United States Army
- Service years: 1978-2018
- Rank: Brigadier General (United States Army)
- Commands: 142nd Infantry (LRS) (Airborne); 411th Civil Affairs Battalion; 360th Civil Affairs Brigade (Airborne); 353rd Civil Affairs Command
- Conflicts: Operation Desert Shield; Operation Desert Storm; Operation Joint Endeavor; Operation Joint Forge; Operation Enduring Freedom; Operation Iraqi Freedom

Picture of BG Guy Sands-Pingot while serving as the Deputy Inspector General for Inspections while assigned to the Special Inspector General for Afghanistan Reconstruction in 2010.

Official Portrait of Brigadier General Guy Sands-Pingot, US Army (Retired)

Guy Ludvic Sands-Pingot is a retired officer of the United States Army who has served as brigadier general of the United States Army Reserve. He served as commander of the 353rd Civil Affairs Command located at Fort Wadsworth, New York from 3 December 2005 through 6 December 2008.

== Early military career and background ==
A native of New York City, Sands was born on October 27, 1957. He attended public schools, graduating as a Regents Scholar from Erasmus Hall High School in Brooklyn, New York in 1974, then went on to Fordham University, where he was a member of the ROTC and the Pershing Rifles drill team. Sands was commissioned as an infantry lieutenant in 1978, after graduating from The City College of New York with a BA in political science with a specialization in Russian area studies. He went on active duty with assignments in the Berlin Brigade, followed by assignments as a tactical officer at the US Army Ranger Training Brigade before being posted to Korea, where he served on the General Staff of the 2nd Infantry Division as the Equal Opportunity Staff Officer (a precursor to the current position of Diversity, Equity, and Inclusion Officer) and later as Commander of the United Nations Honor Guard Company.

Returning to Fort Benning, Georgia, in 1984, he was selected to serve as a Senior Platoon Trainer, and later, Commander of an Infantry Training Company, completing his active duty service in 1988. He then accepted a fellowship to study International Economics at the University of St. Andrews in Scotland. After completing his studies he returned to New York City where he went to work for Arthur Andersen Consulting firm as a senior management consultant. Simultaneously, he joined the New York Army National Guard, where he took command of the 142nd Infantry Detachment (LRS) (Airborne) until he was recalled to active duty during Operation Desert Shield and Operation Desert Storm, with the 48th Infantry Brigade of the Georgia Army National Guard as Commander of the Headquarters and Headquarters Company of the 1/141st Infantry Battalion.

== Special Forces Training, Bosnia, and Kosovo ==
Following release from active duty, he was selected for Special Forces training with the 20th Special Forces Group (ARNG), and he underwent training at the John F. Kennedy Special Warfare Center & School at Fort Bragg, North Carolina, completing the Special Forces Officer Qualification Course in 1993 earning his Green beret as a Special Forces Officer in October 1993.

After completing Special Forces and Russian language training, he was accepted for assignment in the 353rd Civil Affairs Command in early 1994. For the next six years he served in a variety of civil-military positions with a focus on the Balkans, the first assignment being with the United Nations Protection Force (UNPROFOR) during the Bosnian Civil War throughout 1995 and later with the NATO Implementation Force (IFOR) and Stabilization Force (SFOR). During his time as the UNPROFOR Sector North-East Deputy Chief of Staff, G-5 (Civil Affairs) in Tuzla from January through August 1995, Sands was the only US military officer assigned directly to UNPROFOR.

Sands assisted in housing and feeding the Bosnian Muslim women, children and elderly men from the Bosnian Serb attacks on the UN declared Safe Zone of Srebrenica in mid-July 1995. He designed the lay-out of the collection site on the pitch of Tuzla Airbase and assisted the Dutch Acting Sector Commander Charles Brantz in providing those 20,000 Muslim refugees and Displaced Persons from other parts of Bosnia-Herzegovina proper life conditions in the time frame 13 July to 9 August 1995. He was arrested by the Swedish Guards when he had broken in the Sectors Communication Center in the process of falsifying ID cards for a number of those Muslims. His actions at the front gate of Tuzla Airbase were not according to the orders of the Acting Sector Commandant and he undermined the authority of the Sector Commander by doing that in front of the cameras of a number of media outlets. After some difficulties raised by the Jordanian detachment that did not succeed in setting up a Dzamjia (Mosque) on the airfield, he was ordered by the Sector Commander to support the Scandinavian detachment to set up the mosque serving as both a place of worship and a school facility for the 4,000 school-age refugee children then staying at the refugee camp. For his care and compassion to the Muslim refugee population, Sands was publicly thanked and commended by the then Reis-ul-Ulema of Bosnia, Dr. Mustafa Cerić for the protection and service to the Bosniak Muslim population. As a result, Sands was later awarded the Golden Lily badge, the highest decoration of the then government of the Republic of Bosnia and Herzegovina.

On the civilian side he worked in various managerial level positions in Bosnia with the Department of States Train and Equip Program for the Federation of Bosnia-Herzegovina Army, and afterward with the Organization for Security and Cooperation in Europe (OSCE) mission in Bosnia. In October 1998 he was selected to serve as a senior planner for the OSCE Kosovo Verification Mission which he stayed with until evacuating from Serbia to the Republic of Macedonia in March 1999 for the duration of the NATO Air Campaign.

Following this assignment he returned to Kosovo in a civilian status in order to serve as the Chief of Plans and Liaison for the newly established OSCE Mission to Kosovo. He was subsequently named by the United Nations Mission in Kosovo as the International Administrator of Zubin Potok, one of the Municipal Districts of Kosovo that had a majority Serbian population and a sizeable Albanian population. Throughout his two-year tenure as the International Administrator, he was credited with instituting impartial social, economic, political, and cultural initiatives that resulted in an immediate reduction of tensions between the Serbian and Albanian populations in the Municipality.

In addition to ensuring the return of almost 1,000 Albanian residents to their township of Cabra, while ensuring that the resident Serbian communities were given guarantees of security and fair administrative and economic activities from the international community to include, UNMIK, KFOR, and the OSCE. Returning to active military service in Jan 2001, he was assigned as Deputy J9 at the Headquarters of KFOR in Pristina, Kosovo where he ensured economic initiatives based on free-market principles of transparency and open competition were made mandatory for the disbursement of reconstruction funds to various regions throughout Kosovo.

== Service in Afghanistan and Iraq ==
Returning to the United States following the attacks of September 11th, 2001, he assumed command of the 411th Civil Affairs Battalion located in Danbury, Connecticut. This was followed by study at the Army War College in 2003.

Following promotion to colonel and graduation he assumed command of the 360th Civil Affairs Brigade (Airborne) at Fort Jackson, South Carolina in July 2003, he was subsequently mobilized and deployed to the Central Command Area of Operations as the Commander of the Combined Joint Civil Affairs Task Force (Task Force Victory) which provided all civil-military operations throughout Afghanistan from September 2004 to July 2005. Of particular note, Sands oversaw the establishment of 23 Provincial Reconstruction Teams throughout Afghanistan. One of the major achievements Sands was able to accomplish was the restoration and rebuilding of over 500 mosques, 300 schools, and 40 hospitals and medical facilities. Additionally, he was personally thanked by Dr. Ashraf Ghani who was at that time, the President of Kabul University for the efforts Sands made to restore that institution to full operating capacity to include the restoration of the university mosque.

Following his return to the US, he was nominated and confirmed to the rank of brigadier general in November 2005 and named as the next Commanding General of the 353rd Civil Affairs Command in Staten Island, New York in December 2005.

== Civilian service in Afghanistan and Homeland Defense ==
After retiring in 2006, he was selected and appointed in 2008 to serve as a Senior Executive civilian government official as the assistant inspector general for inspections within the newly created Office of the Special Inspector general for Afghanistan Reconstruction. In this position he assisted in standing up this new congressionally created agency charged with reporting to the American people where over $104 billion of reconstruction money has been spent in Afghanistan since 2001. This position took him throughout Afghanistan during 2009 and resulted in the publishing of numerous reports of inspections on various projects.

In May 2010 he was selected to serve as the deputy to the commanding general of US Army North/Fifth Army at Fort Sam Houston, San Antonio, Texas, and appointed as a Tier-2 level member of the Senior Executive Service. He followed this position with appointment to be the Principal Deputy G-3/5/7 of Army Materiel Command at Redstone Arsenal in Huntsville, Alabama. In early 2014 he was assigned to serve as the Director of Human Capital for the Office of the Chief, Army Reserve and G-1 of the US Army Reserve Command where he oversaw all personnel management issues and policies for 200,000 Soldiers, 14,000 civilians and their families. Since January 2019, he has served as an intermittent Professor of Program Management at the Defense Acquisition University (Warfighting Acquisition University). He and his wife Valentina and their daughters, Maria-Margaret and Christina reside in northern Virginia.

== Education ==
In addition to his master's degree in Strategic Studies from the US Army War College, he holds advanced postgraduate degrees in Political Economy from Fordham University, International Relations from Troy State University, and International Economics from St. Andrews University, as well as having completed graduate work at Oxford University, and Creighton University where he earned his doctorate in Interdisciplinary Leadership.

== Awards and decorations ==
- Distinguished Service Medal
- Legion of Merit (x1 Oak Leaf Cluster (OLC))
- Bronze Star Medal (x1 OLC)
- Defense Meritorious Service Medal
- Meritorious Service Medal (x2 OLC)
- Joint Service Commendation Medal (x2 OLC)
- Army Commendation Medal (x3 OLC)
- Joint Service Achievement Medal
- Army Achievement Medal (x1 OLC)
- Army Reserve Components Achievement Medal (x4 OLC)
- Army of Occupation Medal
- National Defense Service Medal (x1 OLC)
- Armed Forces Expeditionary Medal (with 1 campaign star)
- Kosovo Campaign Medal (x2 campaign stars)
- Iraqi Campaign Medal (with 1 campaign star)
- Global War on Terrorism Expeditionary Medal
- Global War on Terrorism Service Medal (with 2 campaign stars)
- Korean Defense Service Medal
- Armed Forces Service Medal (with 1 campaign star)
- Humanitarian Service Medal (x2 OLC)
- Army Service Ribbon
- Overseas Service Ribbon
- Army Reserve Components Overseas Training Ribbon (with M, Hour-Glass, & 2 devices)
- United Nationals Special Service Medal (x5 OLC)
- NATO Medal (x2 OLC)
- Master Infantryman Badge
- Combat Infantryman Badge
- Expert Infantryman Badge
- Combat Action Badge
- Knight of Grace, The Venerable Order of St. John (UK)
- Knight Commander with Star, The Equestrian Order of the Holy Sepulchre (Vatican)
- Knight of Merit with Star, The Constantinian Order of St. George (Spanish Royal Family)

=== Qualifications ===
- Special Forces Tab
- Ranger Tab
- German, Canadian, Republic of China, and Thai Parachutist Badges
- Air Assault Badge
- Parachutist Badge.
