= Spye Park (disambiguation) =

Spye Park may refer to:

- Spye Park, Wiltshire, an estate house in England
- Spye Park (White Plains, Maryland), listed on the NRHP in Maryland
