= 352nd Civil Affairs Command =

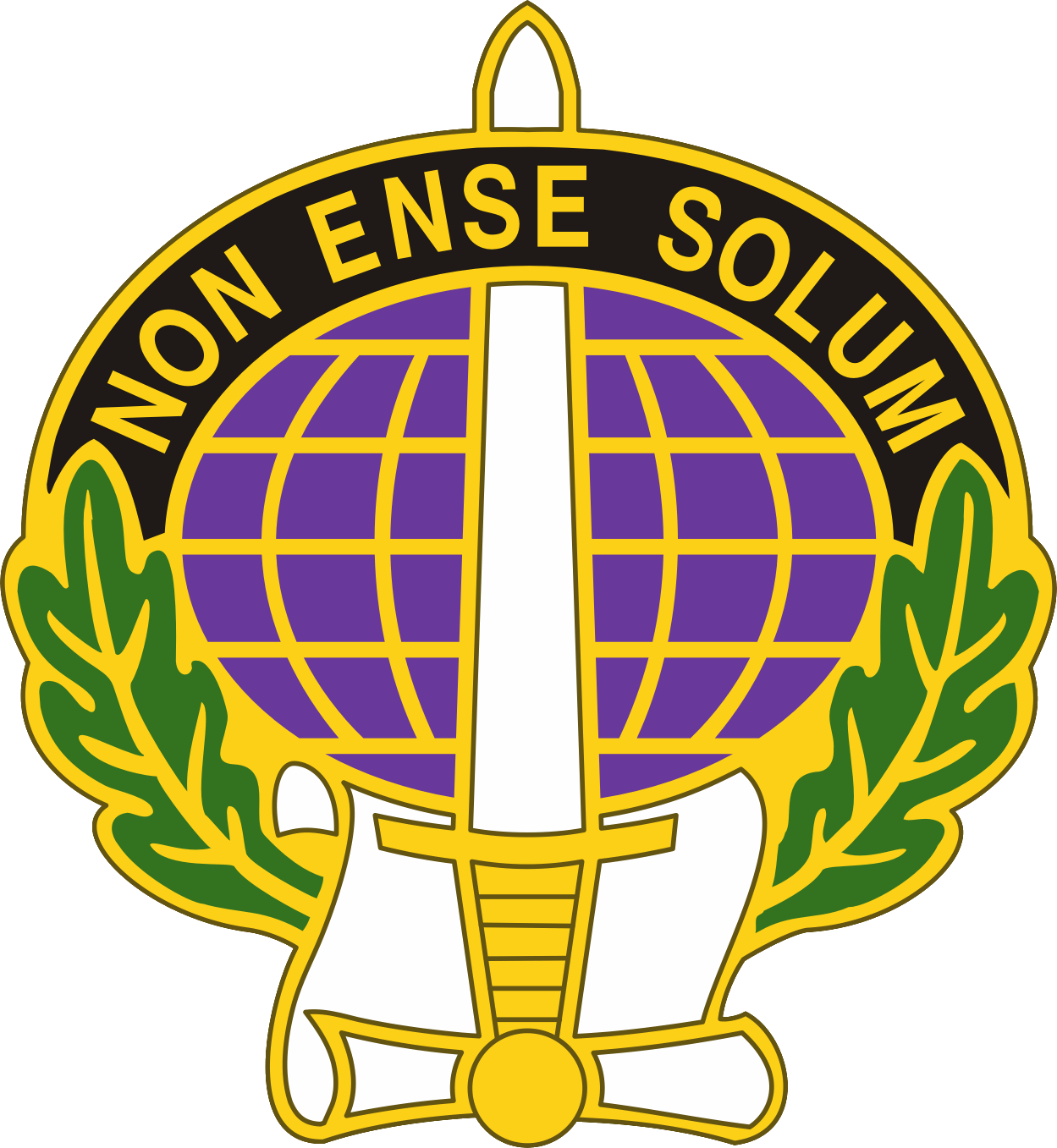
- 352nd Civil Affairs Command Distinctive Unit Insignia
- Active: 1966-present
- Country: United States
- Branch: United States Army Reserve
- Role: Civil Affairs
- Size: Command
- Part of: U.S. Army Civil Affairs and Psychological Operations Command
- Garrison/HQ: Fort Meade, Maryland
- Motto: Non Ense Solum (Not By The Sword Alone)
- Website: https://www.usar.army.mil/USACAPOC/352ndCACOM/

Commanders
- Current commander: BG Reginald J. Kornegay
- Command Sergeant Major: CSM Erich Muehleisen

Insignia
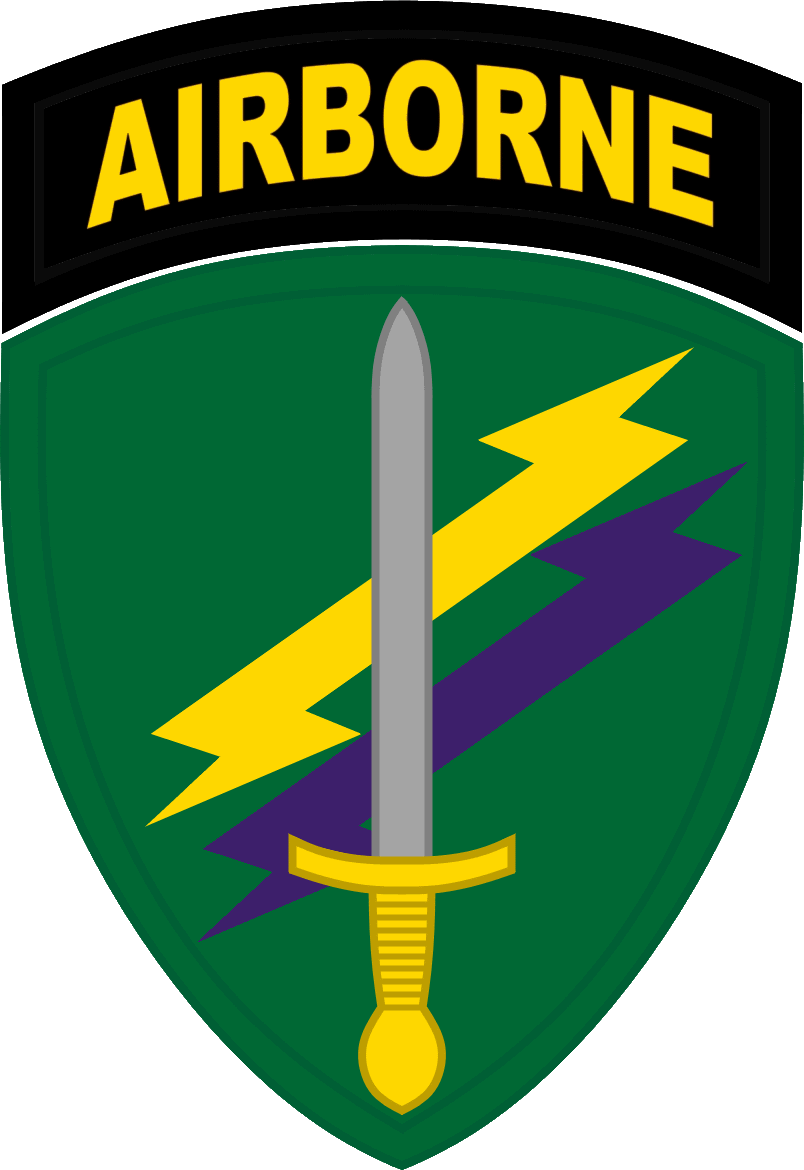
- USACAPOC Shoulder Sleeve Insignia, worn by the 352nd Civil Affairs Command and all other subordinate USACAPOC units

- Former shoulder sleeve insignia of the 352nd Civil Affairs Command

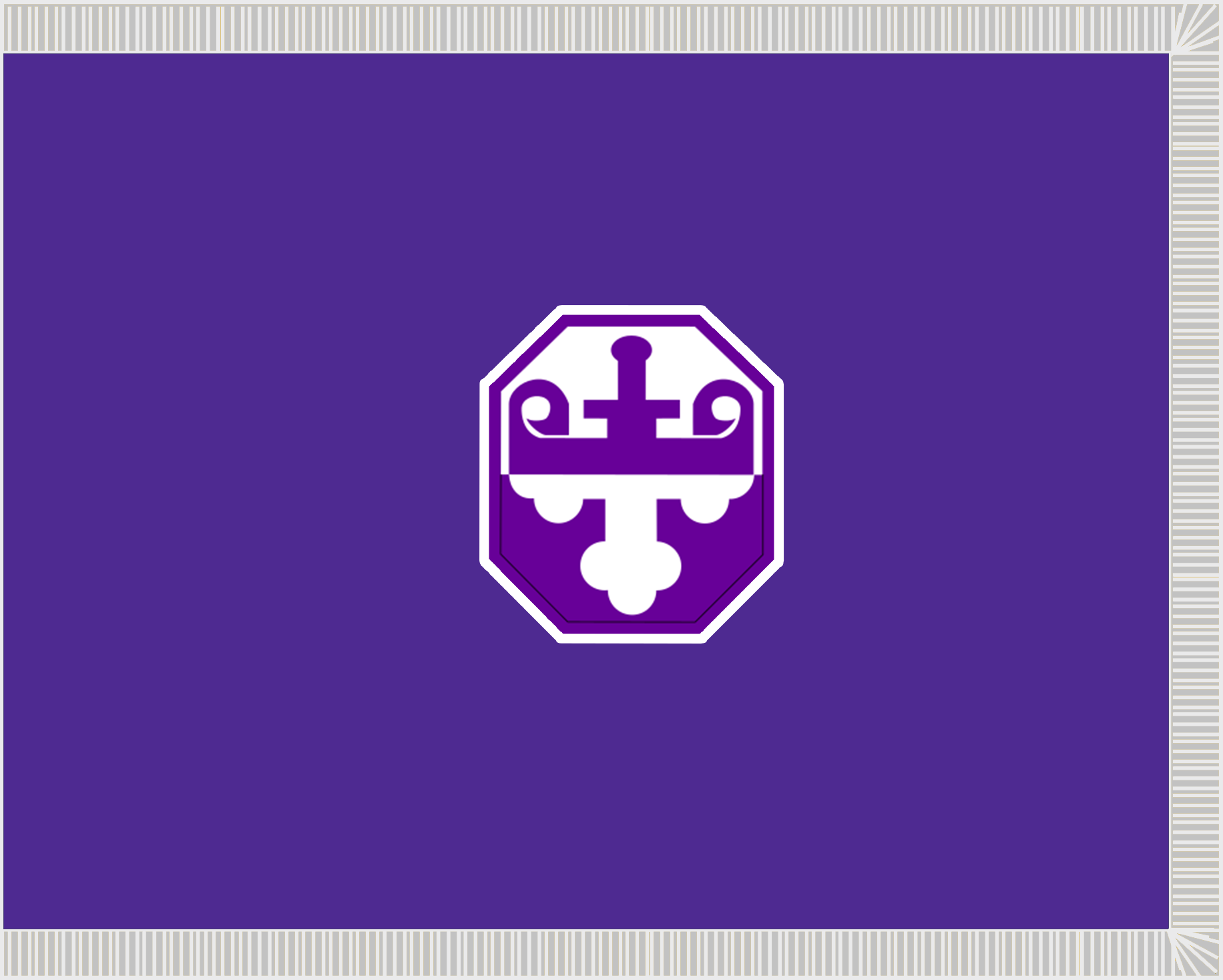
- 352nd Civil Affairs Command Flag

The 352nd Civil Affairs Command is a unit of the US Army Reserve since 1966 and is a part of the Army Civil Affairs and Psychological Operations Command. The unit was originally created as the 352nd Civil Affairs Area in Washington, DC. The unit moved to Riverdale, Maryland and was redesignated HHC 352nd Civil Affairs Command in 1975.

In 1990, five detachments were sent to Kuwait for Operation Desert Storm earning three battle streamers: Southwest Asia, Liberation and Defense of Kuwait and Cease-Fire. In 2003, the command was federalized for the Global War on Terror earning two streamers: War on Terrorism, Global War on Terrorism. In 2006 the command moved to Ft. Meade, Maryland.

== Organization ==
The command is a subordinate unit of the Civil Affairs and Psychological Operations Command (Airborne). As of January 2026 the command consists of the following units:

- 352nd Civil Affairs Command, at Fort Meade (MD)
  - Headquarters and Headquarters Company, at Fort Meade (MD)
  - 354th Civil Affairs Brigade, in White Plains (MD)
    - Headquarters and Headquarters Company, in White Plains (MD)
    - 414th Civil Affairs Battalion, in Southfield (MI)
    - 422nd Civil Affairs Battalion, in McLeansville (NC)
    - 437th Civil Affairs Battalion, at Joint Expeditionary Base Fort Story (VA)
    - 489th Civil Affairs Battalion, in Knoxville (TN)
  - 360th Civil Affairs Brigade (Airborne), at Fort Jackson (SC)
    - Headquarters and Headquarters Company, at Fort Jackson (SC)
    - 404th Civil Affairs Battalion (Airborne), at Joint Base McGuire–Dix–Lakehurst (NJ)
    - 412th Civil Affairs Battalion (Airborne), in Columbus (OH)
    - 450th Civil Affairs Battalion (Airborne), in White Plains (MD)
    - 478th Civil Affairs Battalion (Airborne), in Perrine (FL)
