= 360th Civil Affairs Brigade =

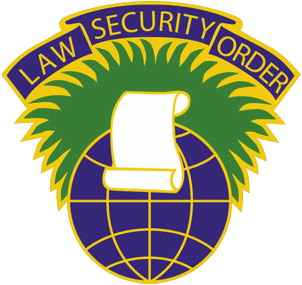
- 360th Civil Affairs Brigade distinctive unit insignia
- Active: 1966–present
- Country: United States
- Branch: United States Army
- Type: U.S. Army Reserve
- Role: Civil Affairs
- Size: Brigade
- Part of: 352nd Civil Affairs Command of USACAPOC
- Garrison/HQ: Fort Jackson, South Carolina

Insignia
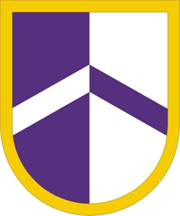
- 360th Civil Affairs Brigade Beret Flash

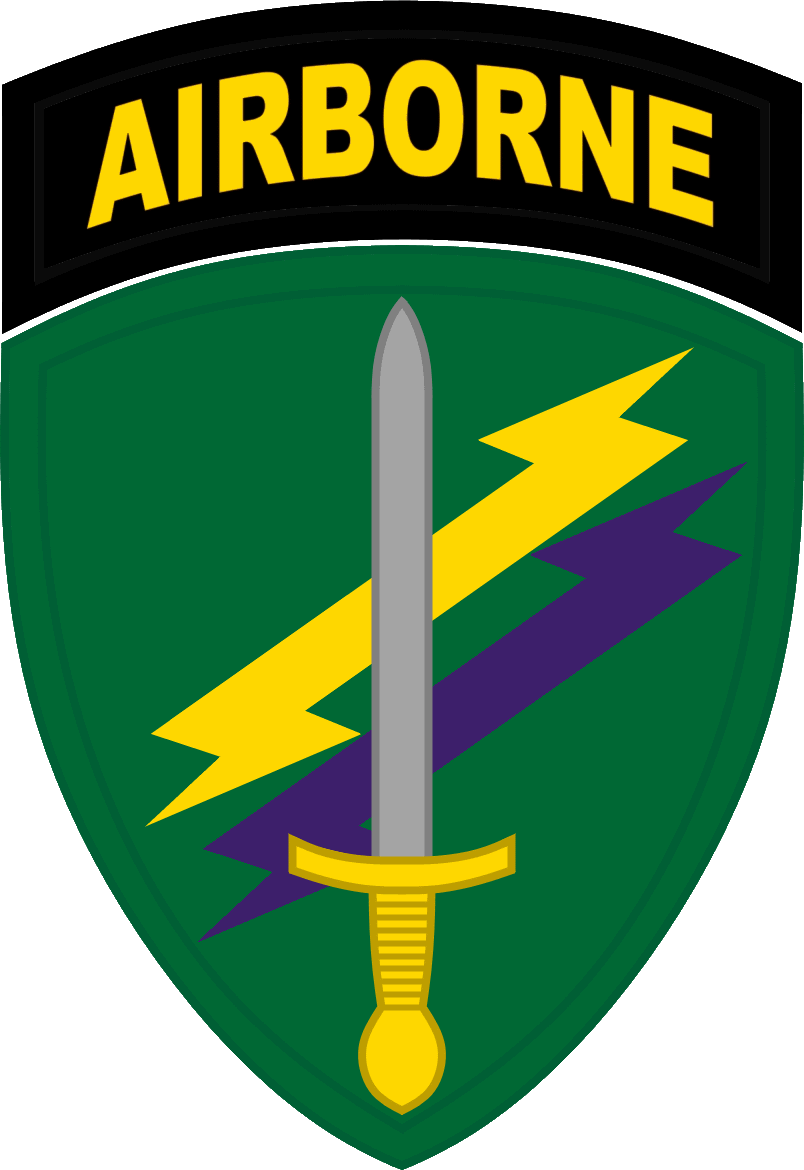
- USACAPOC Shoulder Sleeve Insignia (SSI), worn by the 360th Civil Affairs Brigade and all other subordinate USACAPOC units

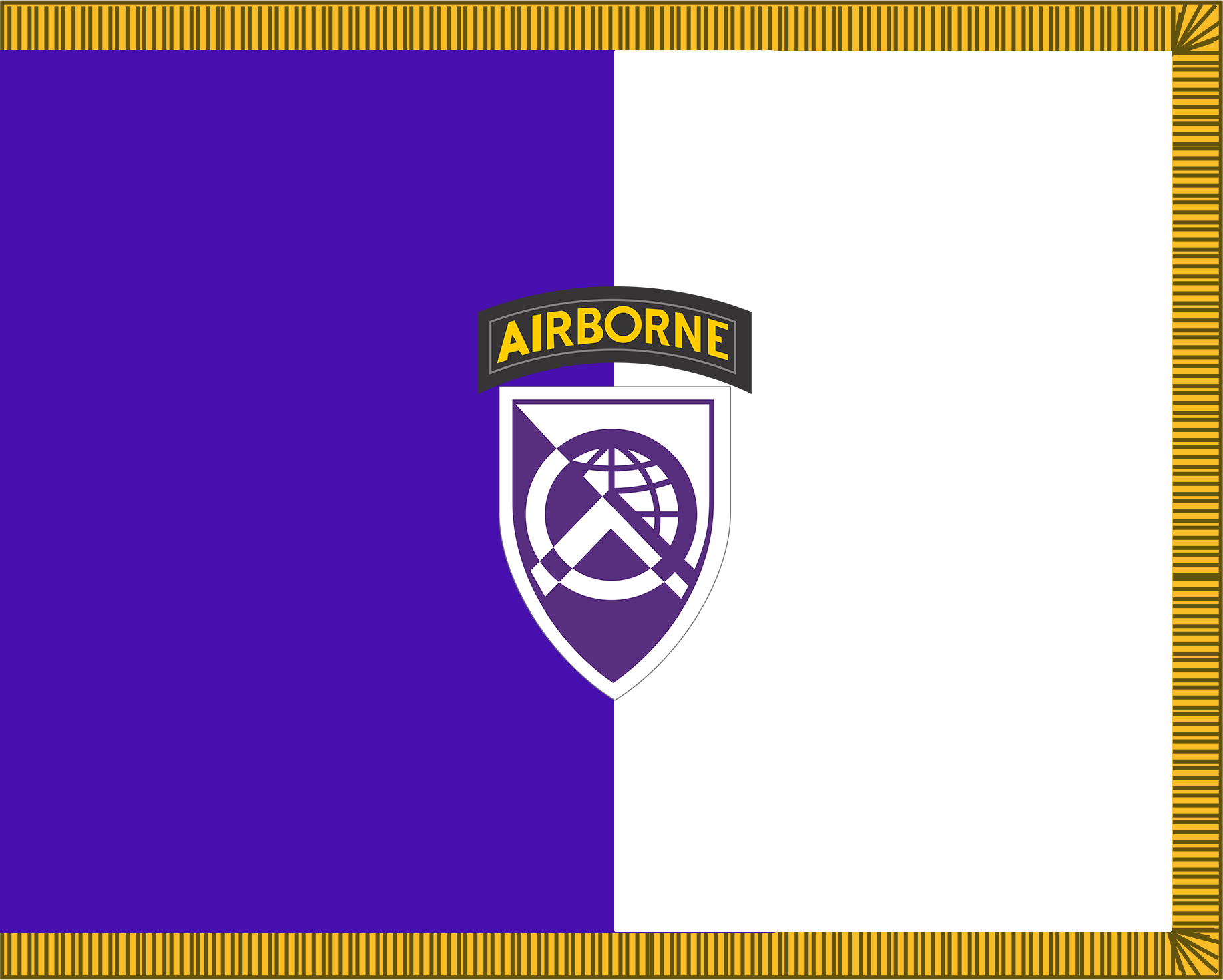
- 360th Civil Affairs Brigade Flag

The 360th Civil Affairs Brigade (Airborne) is a civil affairs brigade of the United States Army stationed at Fort Jackson, South Carolina. It is a unit of the United States Army Reserve and falls under the 352nd Civil Affairs Command. The 360th CA BDE(A) is one of only two brigade-size airborne formations within the United States Army Civil Affairs and Psychological Operations Command (USACAPOC) with four subordinate civil affairs airborne qualified battalions; the second being the 7th Psychological Operations Group (Airborne).

== Organization ==
The brigade is a subordinate unit of the 352nd Civil Affairs Command. As of January 2026 the brigade consists of the following units:

- 360th Civil Affairs Brigade (Airborne), at Fort Jackson (SC)
  - Headquarters and Headquarters Company, at Fort Jackson (SC)
  - 404th Civil Affairs Battalion (Airborne), at Joint Base McGuire–Dix–Lakehurst (NJ)
  - 412th Civil Affairs Battalion (Airborne), in Columbus (OH)
  - 450th Civil Affairs Battalion (Airborne), in White Plains (MD)
  - 478th Civil Affairs Battalion (Airborne), in Perrine (FL)

Each Civil Affairs Battalion consists of a Headquarters and Headquarters Company and four civil affairs companies.

== Former SSI heraldry ==
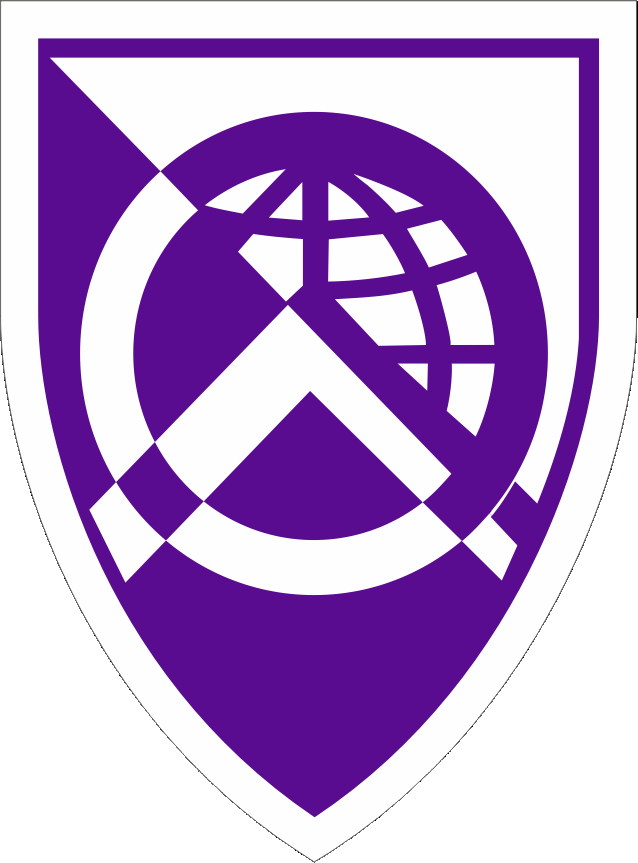
Original 360th Civil Affairs Brigade SSI

360th Civil Affairs Brigade (Airborne) SSI

Purple and white are the colors used for Civil Affairs units. The annulet or circle, a symbol for continuity and perfection, together with a chevron representing the gables of a house and also the military presence, symbolizes with the globe, the worldwide aspects and mission of organization. Furthermore, the circle in its sum total of 360 degrees alludes not only to the numerical designation, but combined with the chevron also forms the initials of the organization.

The SSI was approved on 28 January 1977. It was amended to include an airborne tab on 23 March 2004. It was amended to delete the airborne tab on 20 April 2016.
