= Herbert Altshuler =

American major general (born 1945)

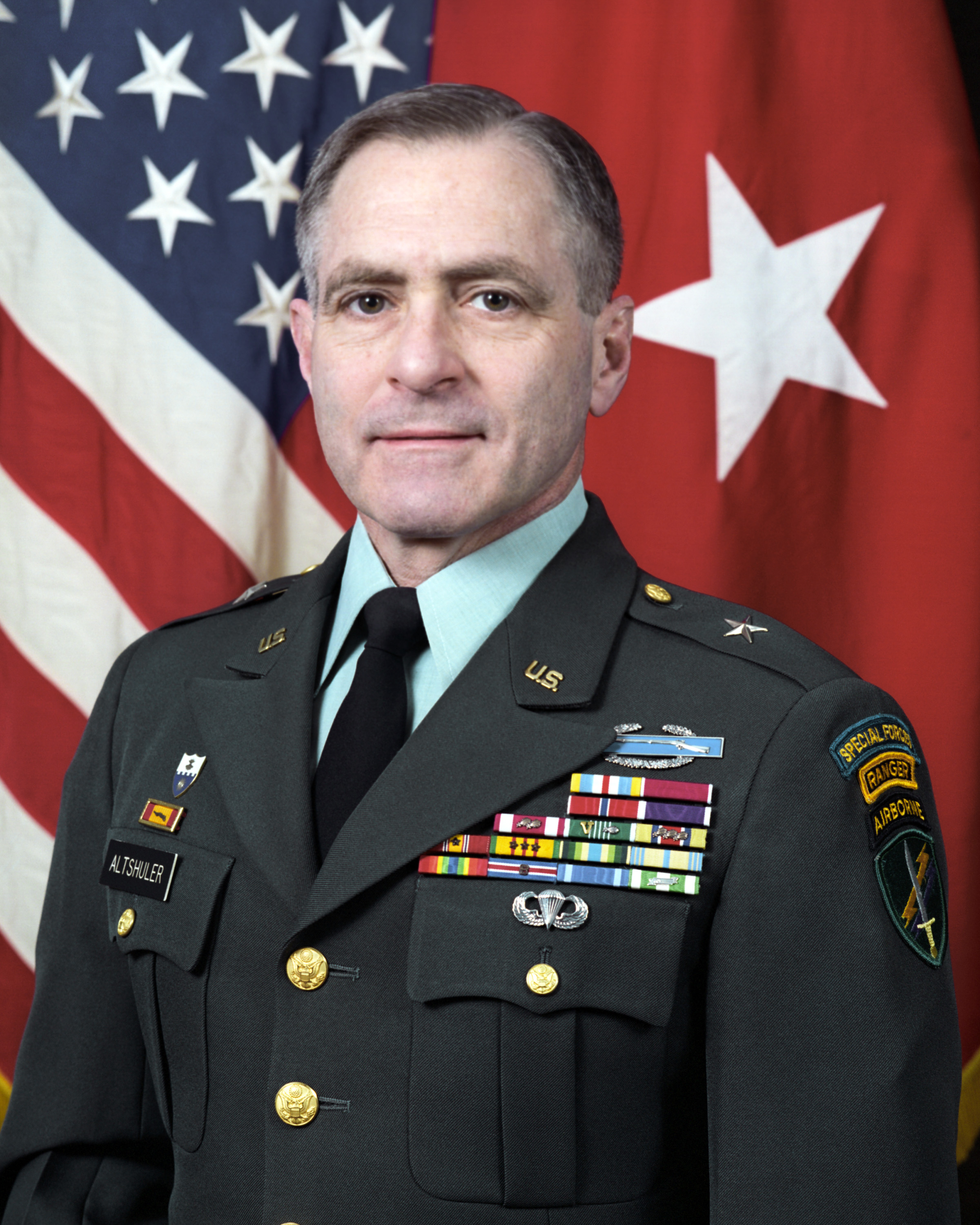
- Altschuler as a Brigadier General in 1996
- Born: February 3, 1945 (age 81); The Bronx, New York, U.S.
- Military career
- Allegiance: United States of America
- Branch: United States Army
- Service years: 1967–2008
- Rank: Major general (United States Army)
- Nickname: Buz
- Commands: USACAPOC(A)
- Conflicts: Vietnam War; Operation Joint Endeavor

Herbert Lewis "Buz" Altshuler (born February 3, 1945) is a retired American major general who served as director of strategy and plans for USAFRICOM, and commanded United States Army Civil Affairs and Psychological Operations Command (Airborne) (USACAPOC) from 2001 to 2007.

== Military career and background ==
Born in The Bronx, Altshuler graduated from the United States Military Academy and was commissioned as a second lieutenant of Infantry in 1967. During the Vietnam War, he served as a rifle platoon leader in the 173rd Airborne Brigade, as well as a battalion operations officer, and rifle company commander in the 1st Battalion, 22nd Infantry. Returning the United States, he served in various command and staff positions, including aide-de-camp to the commander, 5th Infantry Division at Fort Carson, Colorado.

After leaving active duty, he served as operations officer, 14th Psychological Operations Battalion, and as operations officer, 7th Psychological Operations Group. Assigned to the 351st Civil Affairs Command, he served as exercise director, Secretary General Staff and Headquarters Commandant. In October 1985, he was promoted to lieutenant colonel and assumed command of the 353rd Psychological Operations Battalion, until his departure to attend the Army War College.

He returned to the 351st Civil Affairs Command as Chief of Operations and Plans Division, where he was promoted to colonel in 1989. In July 1991 he was assigned to the Primary Staff as deputy chief of staff of Intelligence and Security, and on June 7, 1992, Colonel Altshuler assumed command of the 7th Psychological Operations Group.

In December 1995 he was mobilized and deployed to Bosnia in support of Operation Joint Endeavor, where he served as Commander, Combined Joint Psychological Operations/IFOR Information Campaign Task Force, and senior psychological operations officer, Implementation Force (IFOR) staff in Bosnia and Herzegovina. Returning home in March 1996, he relinquished command of the 7th Psychological Operations Group and assumed command of the 351st Civil Affairs Command. He returned to Bosnia with the 351st as commander of the Combined Joint Civil Military Task Force and Deputy CJ9, Civil-Military Co-operation (CIMIC), to Commander, Stabilisation Force (SFOR).

On June 27, 1997, he was promoted to brigadier general. Upon his return from Bosnia in January 1998, he resumed command of the 351st Civil Affairs Command until March 2000, when he took command of the 89th Regional Support Command (RSC) in Wichita, Kansas. On October 7, 2000, he was promoted to major general. He departed the 89th RSC on April 22, 2001, to assume command of the United States Army Civil Affairs and Psychological Operations Command (Airborne), where he served until 2007. He was then transferred to the newly created United States Africa Command (USAFRICOM) as director of strategy, plans and programs.

Altshuler retired on December 30, 2008, and was awarded the Distinguished Service Medal.

His military education includes the Infantry Officer Basic and Advanced Courses, Basic Airborne, Ranger and Special Forces courses, the Civil Affairs Officers Advanced Course, United States Army Command and General Staff College, and the United States Army War College.

His awards and decorations include two awards of the Defense Superior Service Medal, three awards of the Legion of Merit, the Bronze Star, the Purple Heart, three awards of the Meritorious Service Medal, the Army Commendation Medal with "V" Device and five Oak Leaf Clusters, The Combat Infantryman Badge, the Parachutist Badge, Ranger and Special Forces Tabs and numerous campaign and service medals. General Altshuler holds a Bachelor of Science degree from the United States Military Academy and a Master of Business Administration degree from James Madison University.
