= 489th Civil Affairs Battalion =

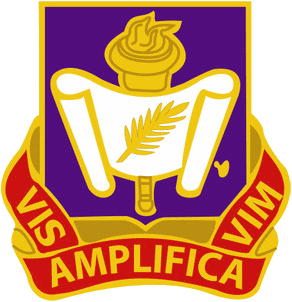
- Distinctive Unit Insignia
- Active: 1945–46; 1955–present
- Country: United States
- Branch: United States Army
- Size: Battalion
- Part of: 354th CA Brigade, 352nd CA Command, USACAPOC(A)
- Garrison/HQ: Isham C. Hewgley United States Army Reserve Center
- Nickname: "Volunteer Battalion" (unofficial)
- Motto: VIS AMPLIFICANS VIM
- Engagements: Operation Iraqi Freedom; Operation Enduring Freedom
- Decorations: Meritorious Unit Commendation (5); Army Superior Unit Award (2); Valorous Unit Award; Joint Meritorious Unit Award

Commanders
- Current commander: LTC Malik Douglas

Insignia
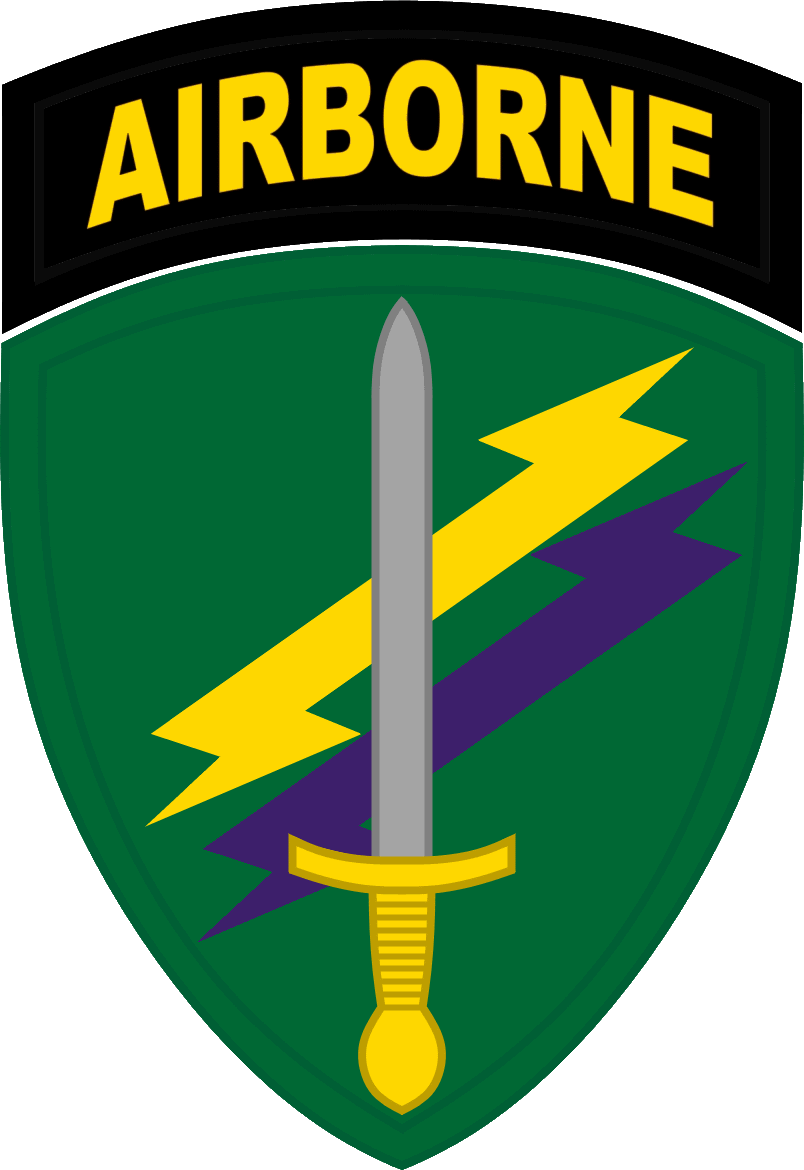
- USACAPOC shoulder sleeve insignia

The 489th Civil Affairs Battalion is a civil affairs (CA) unit of the United States Army Reserve (USAR) located at the US Army Reserve Center in Knoxville, Tennessee, part of the 354th Civil Affairs Brigade, 352nd Civil Affairs Command. In turn the 354th CA Brigade is part of United States Army Civil Affairs and Psychological Operations Command (USACAPOC). The 489th is composed of Headquarters and Headquarters Company (HHC) and its four tactical companies, Alpha, Bravo, Charlie, and Delta. The unit was activated for service during World War II, Bosnia, Operation Enduring Freedom (OEF), and the Iraq War.

== Civil Affairs ==
Civil Affairs Soldiers work with local governments and international humanitarian organizations to rebuild infrastructure and restore stability in areas stricken by war or natural disasters.

They have unique training, skills and experience. Most of the Army's Civil Affairs forces are in the Reserve component, and these Citizen-Soldiers possess finely honed skills practiced daily in the civilian sector as educators, police officers, firemen, veterinarians, nurses, machinists and machine repairmen, landscapers, construction workers, aircraft mechanics, and as an aid to a state representative.

== History ==
=== World War II ===
1945 the unit was founded as the 489th Military Government HHC at the Presidio of Monterey in California. The Presidio of Monterrey served as the central mobilization and holding site for all Military Government and Civil Affairs forces from all branches of service (mainly US Navy and US Army) in response to the realization for a need to successfully manage the occupations of Europe and Japan for reconstruction. The training center was named the Civil Affairs Staging Area (CASA).

==== Redesignation ====
1955 the unit was redesignated as the 489th Military Government Company under the Army Reserve, with its new home in Knoxville, Tennessee.

==== Panama and Desert Storm: 1989–92 ====
1990 the 489th CA BN deployed to Panama to part of the United States invasion of Panama, the post-invasion civil-military operation designed to stabilize the situation, support the U.S.-installed government. The operation was originally planned as Operation Blind Logic, but was renamed "Operation Promote Liberty" by the Pentagon on the eve of the invasion.

In 1991 the 489th Military Government Company became the 489th Civil Affairs Battalion and was assigned to United States Army Civil Affairs and Psychological Operations Command. Shortly afterwards, the 489th was sent to the Middle East after the Iraqi invasion of Kuwait. It was seemingly assigned to VII Corps.

=== Operation Iraqi Freedom: 2004 to 2008 ===
The 489th deployed in 2004, 2007, and again in 2008 to the Iraq War. During this time in Iraq, the battalion worked closely with the local Iraqi population and Iraqi Police. The battalion's teams managed to ensure that the locals had access to drinking water, and food by helping with building wells, building irrigation canals, and instructed proper food transportation and storage. The 489th was also responsible for building schools, and medical facilities. The battalion both helped build up the infrastructure to support the Iraqi population but was also responsible for providing thousands of jobs to the locals.

=== War in Afghanistan ===
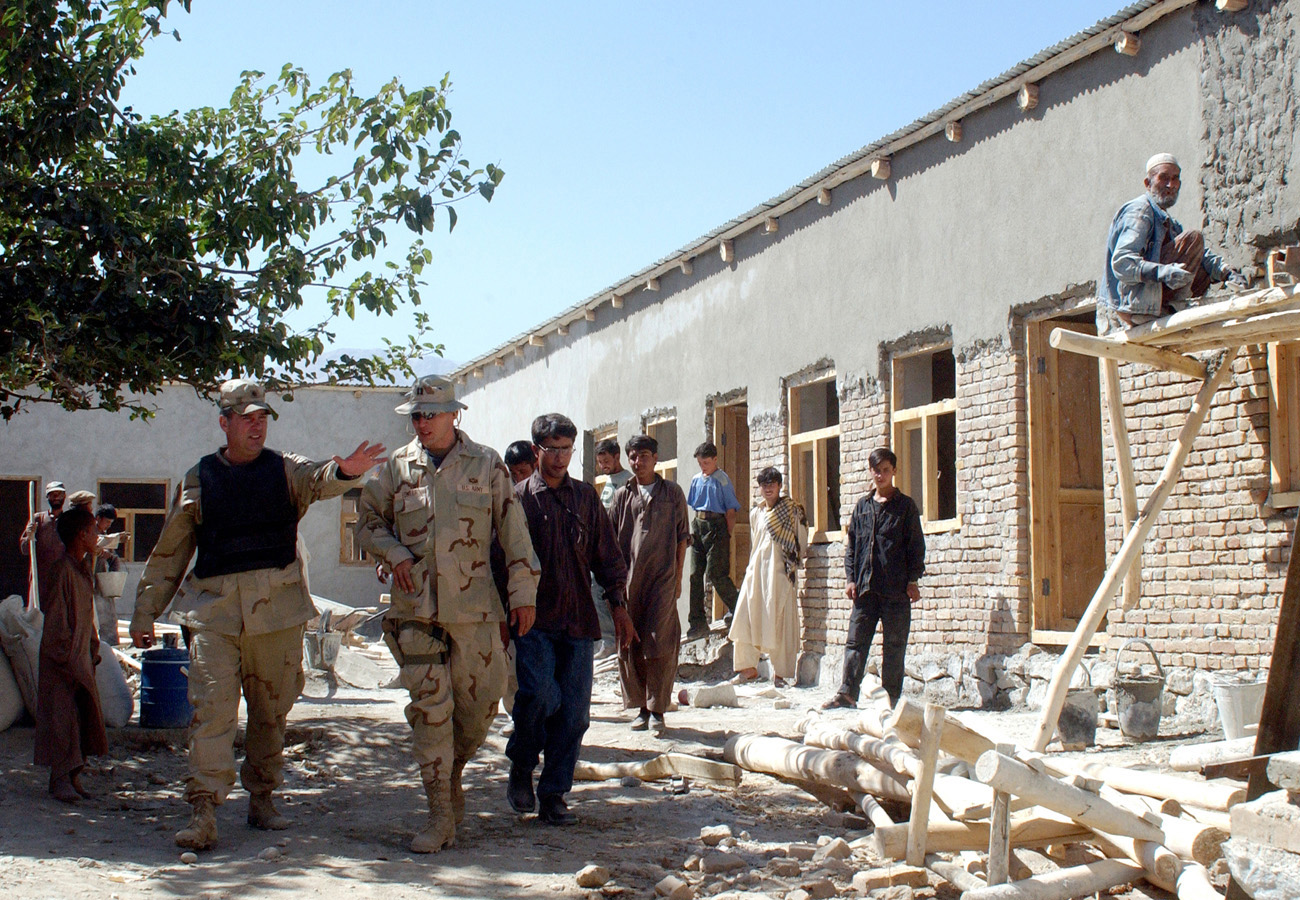
Soldiers from the 489th Civil Affairs Battalion inspect the progress in the construction of a new school.

In 2002, the 489th deployed to Afghanistan at the beginning of the War in Afghanistan (2001-2021). It served under the Combined Joint Civil-Military Operations Task Force from 2002 to July 2003.

While in Afghanistan, the unit was given perhaps the most challenging mission ever entrusted to a USAR battalion, requiring it to operate in small Coalition Humanitarian Liaison Cells (CHLCs) across a combat zone the size of Texas. CHLCs consisted of six to twelve personnel from the battalion. "The CHLCs became the backbone of the U.S. coalition’s effort to rebuild Afghanistan. They worked with U.S. and coalition government and non-governmental organizations on the reconstruction of 15 medical facilities, 77 schools, 205 wells and more than 300 kilometers of irrigation canals. To do the actual labor, the CHLCs hired more than 18,000 Afghan workers." After nearly 10 months in Afghanistan the battalion implemented more than 120 quick-impact reconstruction projects worth $6 million, according to a Meritorious Unit Citation.

Each of the CHLCs "..was co-located with ODA teams – civil affairs team alphas (CAT-As) to be exact. In addition to that, [the battalion] also had other government agencies which, nine times out of 10, all had to do with law enforcement of some type. [The battalion] had some from the CIA, the Defense Intelligence Agency (DIA), the Drug Enforcement Agency and the FBI."

The 489th Civil Affairs Battalion also provided civil affairs support along the Pakistani border. The 489th had teams accompany units from the 82nd Airborne, 101st Air Assault and 10th Mountain Divisions, as well as the British Royal Marines and United States Army Special Forces. The 489th Civil Affairs Battalion deployed again to Afghanistan in 2011. Building relationships with the local Afghan population is very important for the US Military forces and so, showing hospitality is not only important in US culture but also Afghan culture.

In 2006, the battalion continued to support Operation Enduring Freedom in the Horn of Africa. In 2021 the USACAPOC mission redirected its focus from United States Central Command to United States Africa Command.

The Civil Affairs Association website as of March 2023 states the battalion is located at the US Army Reserve Center, 1334 East Weisgarber Road, Knoxville, Tennessee TN 37909-2610.
