= United States Army Civil Affairs and Psychological Operations Command =

Functional command of the U.S. Army Reserve Command

United States Army Civil Affairs and Psychological Operations Command (Airborne)
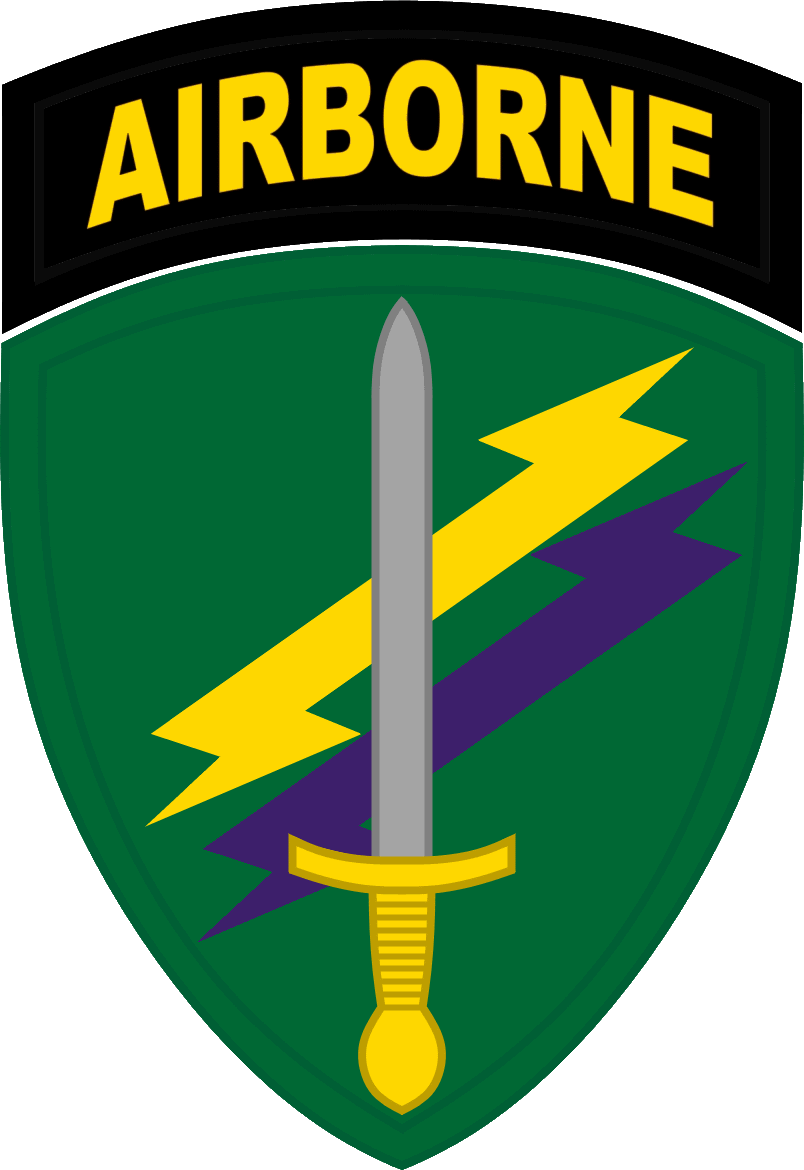
- USACAPOC(A) Shoulder Sleeve Insignia, worn by the command and all subordinate units
- Active: 1990–present
- Country: United States
- Branch: United States Army Reserve
- Role: Civil Affairs and PSYOP
- Part of: United States Army Reserve Command
- Garrison/HQ: Fort Bragg, North Carolina
- Decorations: Army Superior Unit Award
- Website: USACAPOC(A) official website

Commanders
- Current commander: MG Jeffrey M. Farris
- Command Sergeant Major: CSM George H. Conklin

Insignia
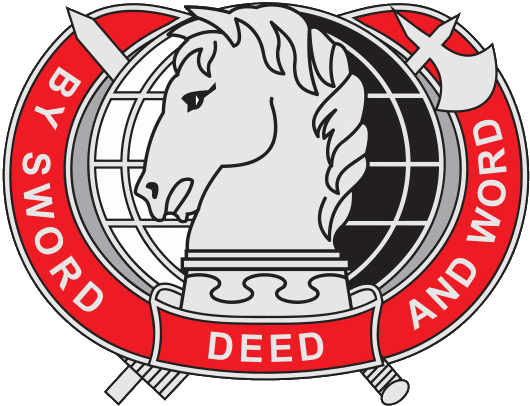
- Distinctive unit insignia of the command

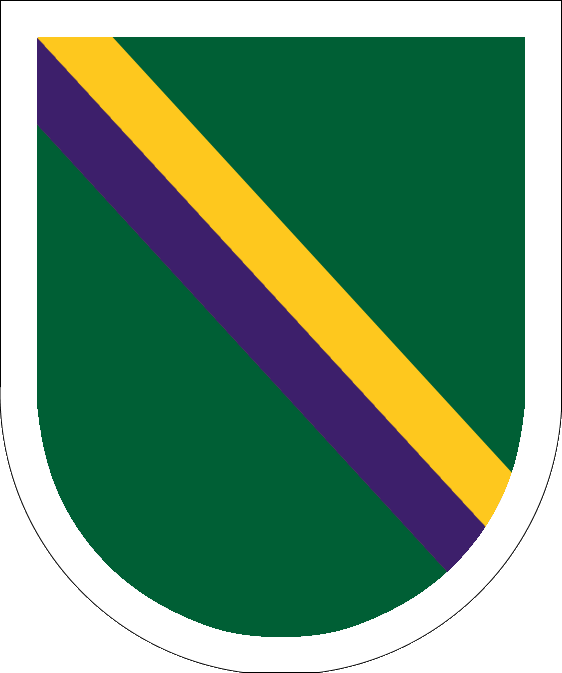
- Beret flash of the command

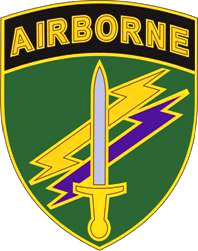
- Combat service identification badge

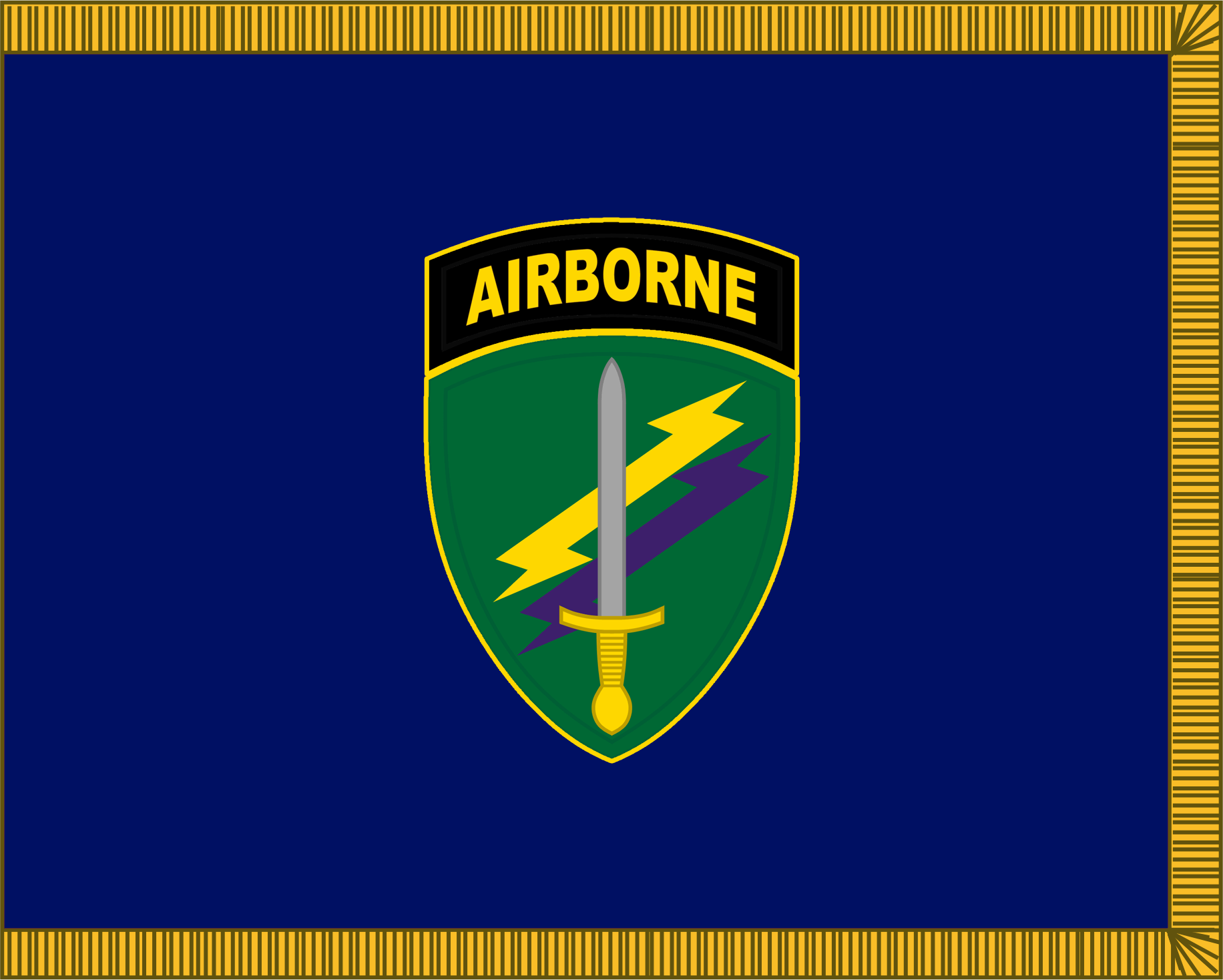
- Civil Affairs and Psychological Operations Command Flag

The United States Army Civil Affairs and Psychological Operations Command (Airborne), USACAPOC(A), or CAPOC was founded in 1985 and is headquartered at Fort Bragg, North Carolina. USACAPOC(A) is composed mostly of U.S. Army Reserve Soldiers in units throughout the United States. The size of the Command is nearly 13,500 Soldiers, which is 76% of the Department of Defense's Civil Affairs forces and 63% of Psychological Operations forces.

Historically, USACAPOC(A) was one of four major subordinate commands composing the U.S. Army Special Operations Command (USASOC). In May 2006, the reserve component of USACAPOC(A) was administratively reorganized under the U.S. Army Reserve Command. The administrative move, however, does not detract from the capability of Army Reserve Civil Affairs Soldiers ability to carry out missions in support of unconventional environments or special operations. Both Active and Reserve component Civil Affairs Soldiers are products of the special operations community, they must go through qualification training at the John F. Kennedy Special Warfare Center and School. The Army Reserve Civil Affairs is considered to be more dynamic than that of their Active duty counterparts. The largest difference being, while the Active component’s focus is mainly on unconventional environments, individual Soldiers from the Army Reserve Civil Affairs may be tasked with supporting both conventional or unconventional operations. In addition, the Army Reserve Civil Affairs largely maintains functional skills or specialties that the Active Component is typically unable to, due to the nature of a separate civilian career or the professional backgrounds of many Reserve Soldiers. The Army's active duty Special Operations Civil Affairs and Psychological Operations units, along with the Civil Affairs and Psychological Operations Force Modernization/Branch Proponents, continue to fall under the U.S. Army Special Operations Command and United States Army John F. Kennedy Special Warfare Center and School, respectively. The Active Component Civil Affairs Brigade—the 95th Civil Affairs Brigade—and the two active component Psychological Operations Groups—the 4th Psychological Operations Group and the 8th Psychological Operations Group—fall under USASOC.

U.S. Army Reserve Civil Affairs and Psychological Operations constitute 5% of the U.S. Army Reserve's total force, but account for approximately 20% of Army Reserve deployments. Reserve Civil Affairs are deployable specialized forces within the Reserve. Reserve Soldiers often bring civilian expertise and education that is typically not found among active-duty soldiers. The projects these elements coordinate are worldwide, but more recently have focused on Iraq, Afghanistan, and the Horn of Africa regions.

Civil Affairs Calling Cards

== Organization ==
The Civil Affairs and Psychological Operations Command is a subordinate functional command of the United States Army Reserve Command. As of January 2026 the command consists of the following units:

- Civil Affairs and Psychological Operations Command (Airborne), at Fort Bragg (NC)
  - Headquarters and Headquarters Company, at Fort Bragg (NC)
  - 350th Civil Affairs Command, at Naval Air Station Pensacola Corry Station (FL)
    - 1st Civil Affairs and Psychological Operations Training Brigade, at Fort Bragg (NC)
    - 151st Theater Information Operations Group, at Fort Totten (NY)
    - 321st Civil Affairs Brigade, at Joint Base San Antonio (TX)
  - 351st Civil Affairs Command, in Mountain View (CA)
    - 7th Psychological Operations Group (Airborne), at Moffett Federal Airfield (CA)
    - 358th Civil Affairs Brigade, at March Air Reserve Base (CA)
    - 364th Civil Affairs Brigade, at Camp Withycombe (OR)
  - 352nd Civil Affairs Command, at Fort Meade (MD)
    - 354th Civil Affairs Brigade, in White Plains (MD)
    - 360th Civil Affairs Brigade (Airborne), at Fort Jackson (SC)
  - 353rd Civil Affairs Command, in Fort Wadsworth (NY)
    - 2nd Psychological Operations Group, at Twinsburg (OH)
    - 304th Civil Affairs Brigade, in Bristol (PA)
    - 308th Civil Affairs Brigade, in Homewood (IL)

== Information Operations Units ==
Information Operations (IO) units are organized and trained to conduct Operations in the Information environment (OIE) defined as the "Military actions involving the integrated employment of multiple information forces to affect drivers of behavior. (JP 3-04)" This is primarily done through the integrated employment of Information Forces (formerly referred to as ‘information related capabilities’ (IRCs), such as Civil Affairs (CA), Psychological Operations (PO), Combat Camera, Public Affairs (CA), and Cyber and Electromagnetic Activities (CEMA).

The 151st Theater Information Operations is Group (151st TIOG) was realigned under the command of USACAPOC(A) in October 2015.

Information Operations units are the field commander's capability to synchronize and de-conflict IRCs in the commander's information environment. The Soldiers consist of teams which interface and provide IO expertise to the staff. 151st TIOG IO practitioners are particularly suited for this mission as U.S. Army Reserve Soldiers with civilian occupations such as law enforcement, engineering, medicine, law, finance, public administration and civil service, etc.; and, civilian education such as Project Management Professional (PMP), Doctor of Philosophy (PhD), Juris Doctor (J.D.), Master of Business Administration (MBA), Master of Public Administration (MPA), etc.

Information Operations Soldiers are integral to U.S. missions across Northwest Africa, East Africa, Europe, Middle East, and various other locations.

== Civil Affairs Units ==
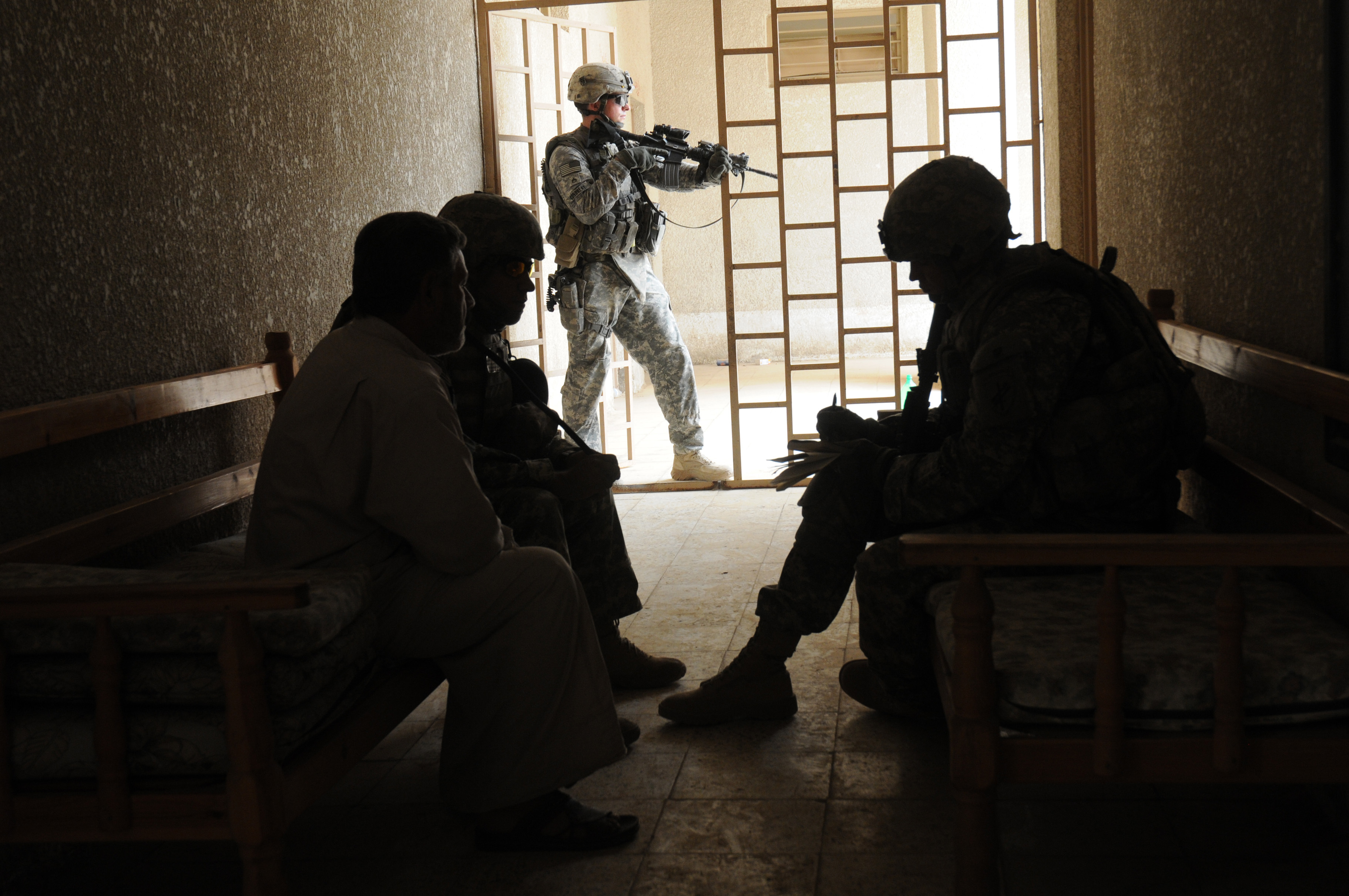
Civil Affairs Conduct Foot Patrol in Sadr City district of Baghdad, Iraq

The primary mission of Civil Affairs is to conduct Civil-military operations. Civil Affairs soldiers are responsible for executing five core Civil Affairs tasks, Civil Information Management, Foreign Humanitarian Assistance, Foreign Assistance, Population and Resource Control, and Support to Civil Administration. Some sub tasks to these core tasks include identifying non-governmental and international organizations operating in the battlespace, handling refugees, civilians on the battlefield, and determining protected targets such as schools, churches/temples/mosques, hospitals, etc.

Civil Affairs units are the field commander's link to the civil authorities in that commander's area of operations. The soldiers make up teams which interface and provide expertise to the host nation government. USACAPOC(A)'s Civil Affairs soldiers are particularly suited for this mission since they are Army Reserve soldiers with civilian occupations such as law enforcement, engineering, medicine, law, banking, public administration, etc.

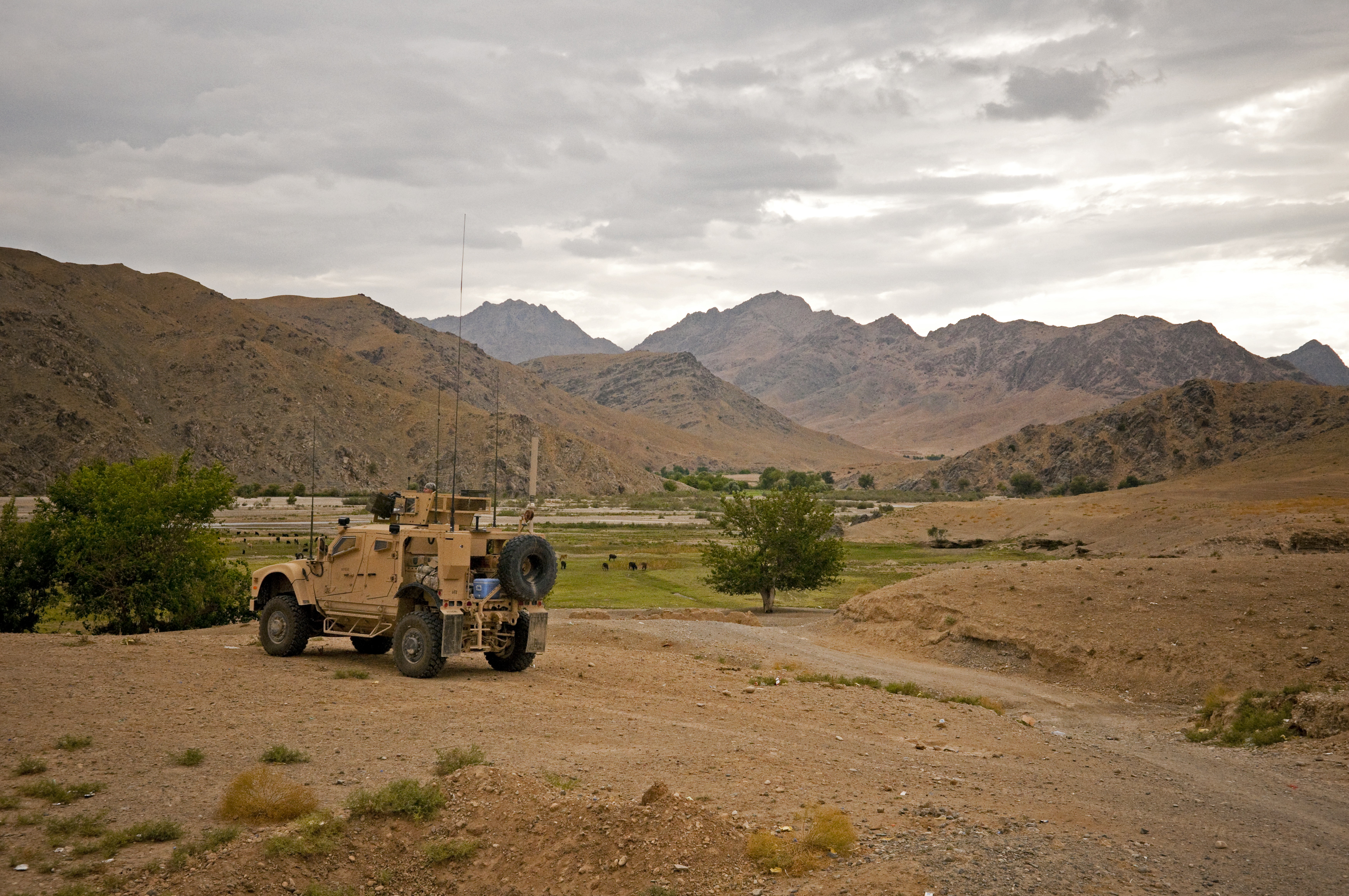
478th Civil Affairs Battalion in Zabul, Afghanistan

Civil Affairs Soldiers have been integral to U.S. peacekeeping operations in Iraq, Afghanistan, the Horn of Africa, Bosnia and Kosovo, among others. Tactical Civil Affairs teams meet with local officials, conduct assessments and determine the need for critical infrastructure projects such as roads, schools, power plants, clinics, sewer lines, etc., and check up on the status of the project after construction by a local company has begun.

== Psychological Operations (PSYOP) Units ==
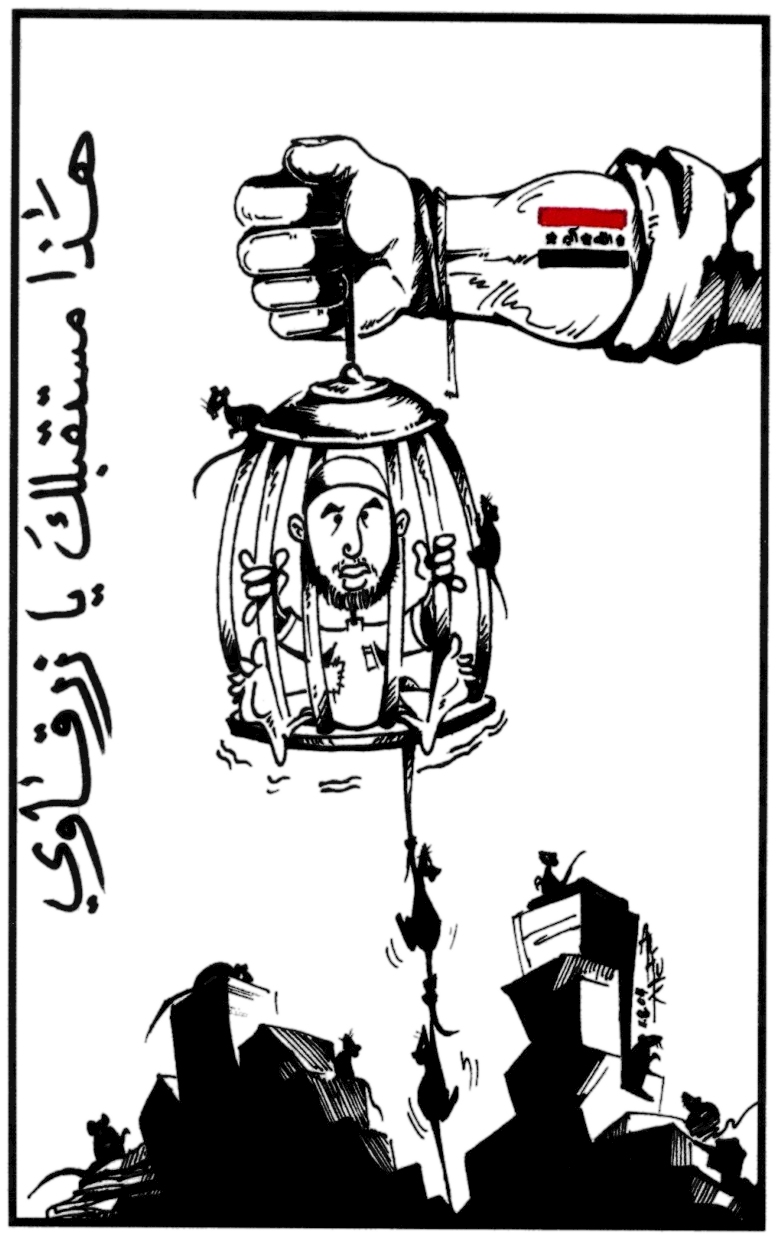
CAPOC pamphlet disseminated in Iraq. The text translates as, "This is your future al-Zarqawi," and depicts al-Qaeda terrorist al-Zarqawi caught in a rat trap. The arm holding up the trap has the Iraqi flag on it.

Psychological warfare are a vital part of the broad range of U.S. political, military, economic and ideological activities used by the U.S. government to secure national objectives. PSYOP is the dissemination of information to foreign audiences in support of U.S. policy and national objectives.

Used during peacetime, contingencies and declared war, these activities are not forms of force, but are force multipliers that use nonviolent means in often violent environments. Persuading rather than compelling physically, they rely on logic, fear, desire, or other mental factors to promote specific emotions, attitudes, or behaviors. The ultimate objective of U.S. military psychological operations is to convince enemy, neutral, and friendly nations and forces to take action favorable to the U.S. and its allies.

Psychological operations (United States) support national security objectives at the tactical, operational and strategic levels of operations. Strategic psychological operations advance broad or long-term objectives. Global in nature, they may be directed toward large audiences or at key communicators.

Operational psychological operations are conducted on a smaller scale. They are employed by theater commanders to target groups within the theater of operations. Their purpose can range from gaining support for U.S. operations to preparing the battlefield for combat.

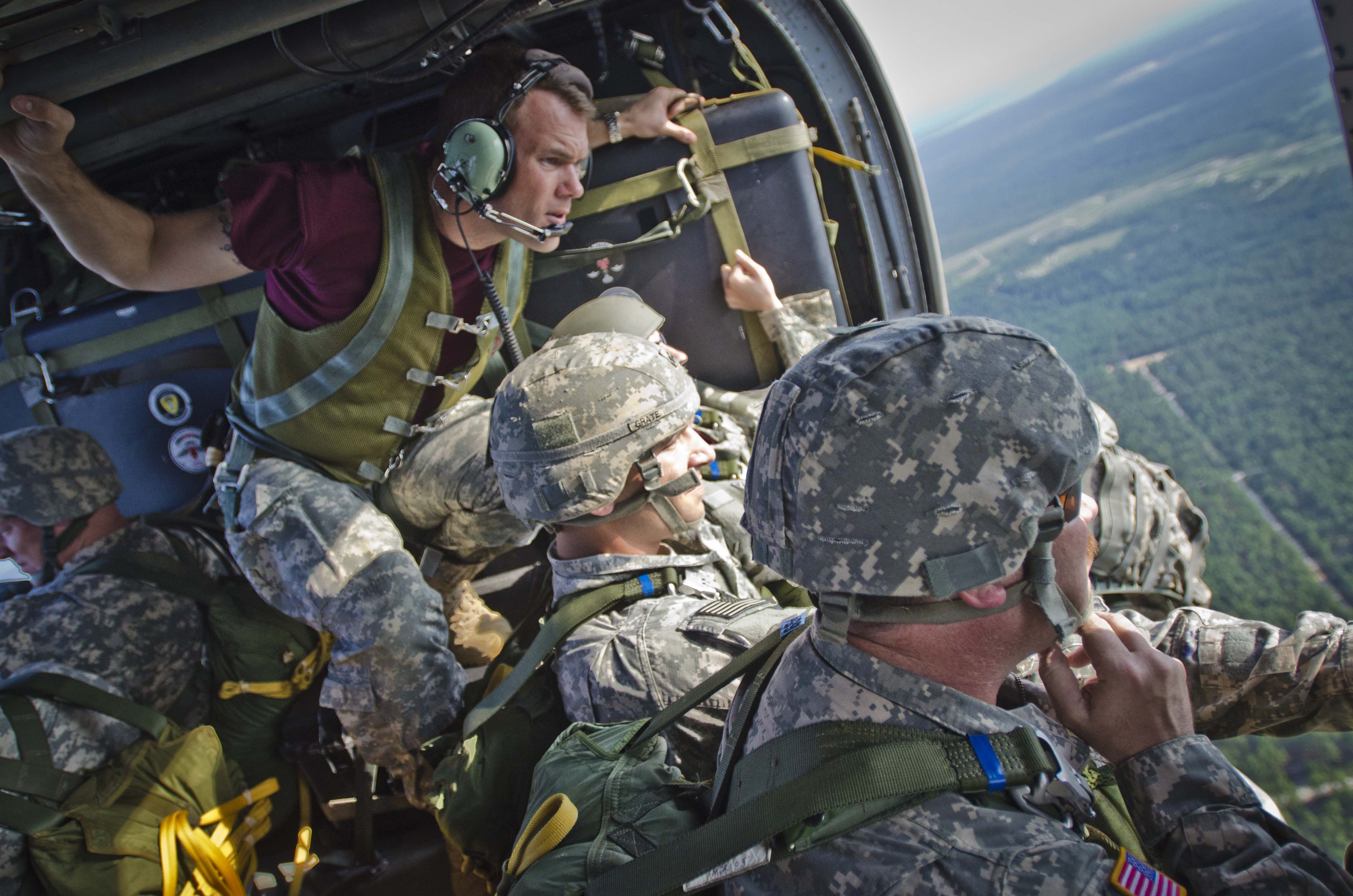
British from 4th Parachute Regiment train with U.S. Army Civil Affairs and Psychological Operations Command in preparation for Afghanistan deployment

Tactical psychological operations are more limited, used by commanders to secure immediate and near-term goals. In this environment, these force-enhancing activities serve as a means to lower the morale and efficiency of enemy forces.

Both tactical and theater-level psychological operations may be used to enhance peacetime military activities of conventional forces operating in foreign countries. Cultural awareness packages attune U.S. forces before departing overseas. In theater, media programs publicize the positive aspects of combined military exercises and deployments.

In addition to supporting commanders, PSYOP units provide interagency support to other U.S. government agencies. In operations ranging from humanitarian assistance to drug interdiction, psychological operations enhance the impact of those agencies' actions. Their activities can be used to spread information about ongoing programs and to gain support from the local populace.

Psychological operations units in the U.S. Army Reserve are language and culturally oriented. Seventy one percent of the Department of Defense's PSYOP capability rests within USACAPOC (A)'s 2nd and 7th Psychological Operations Groups located in Ohio and California respectively.

== See also ==
- Herbert Altshuler
