= Spye Park (White Plains, Maryland) =

Historic house in Maryland, United States

- U.S. National Register of Historic Places
- Location within Maryland Location within the United States
- Location: Padgett Road, White Plains, Maryland
- Coordinates: 38°35′34″N 76°57′17″W
- Area: 8 acres (3.2 ha)
- Built: 1767
- Architectural style: Colonial, Federal
- NRHP reference No.: 90001523
- Added to NRHP: October 4, 1990

Spye Park is a historic home located at White Plains, Charles County, Maryland, United States. It is a modestly scaled, 1 1/2-story, three-bay frame Colonial dwelling built about 1767. The house's present plan and appearance is the result of a series of 19th- and early-20th-century alterations to the original structure, which was a rectangular, one-room-deep building with end chimneys. Also on the property is a timber-framed tobacco barn, a former animal barn, a cornhouse, a poultry house/machine shed, and a wellhouse.

Spye Park was listed on the National Register of Historic Places in 1990.
