= Civil affairs =

Military units for interacting with civilians

Civil Affairs (CA) is a term used by both the United Nations and by military institutions (such as the U.S. military), but for different purposes in each case.

== Civil Affairs in United Nations Peace Operations ==
Civil Affairs officers in UN Peace Operations are civilian staff members who are often at the forefront of a mission's interaction with local government officials, civil society, and other civilian partners in the international community.

"Civil Affairs components work at the social, administrative and sub-national political levels to facilitate the countrywide implementation of peacekeeping mandates and to support the population and government in strengthening conditions and structures conducive to sustainable peace."

Civil Affairs components are deployed in most peacekeeping missions led by the UN Department of Peacekeeping Operations and are also a feature of many special political missions led by the Department of Political Affairs.

Officers are usually deployed at the local level, where they serve as the link between the UN mission, local authorities, and communities. Civil Affairs components work countrywide to strengthen the social and civic conditions necessary to consolidate peace processes and are a core function of multi-dimensional peacekeeping operations. As of mid-2013, there were approximately 700 Civil Affairs Officers in 13 UN Peacekeeping Operations worldwide.

Civil Affairs components perform one or more of three core roles, depending on the UN Security Council mandate given to a particular peacekeeping mission. In each role the work of Civil Affairs intersects with, supports and draws upon the work of a variety of other actors. Depending on the mandate, the three core roles are 1) Cross-mission representation, monitoring and facilitation at the local level; 2) Confidence-building, conflict management and support to reconciliation; and 3) Support to the restoration and extension of state authority.

=== The roots of Civil Affairs in UN Peace Operations ===
There were precursors for what was later termed civil affairs in Central America and in Cambodia during the 1991 to 1993 period. For example, the United Nations Transitional Authority in Cambodia (UNTAC)’s civil administration component was responsible for the supervision of administrative structures in Cambodia, ranging from public security to finance and information. However, the first component known officially as ”civil affairs” was formed in 1992, with the United Nations Protection Force (UNPROFOR)’s mandate in the former Yugoslavia.

The development and growth of civil affairs work has been a critical element of the development and growth of multidimensional peace operations. With the end of the cold war and the increase in peace operations required to respond to intrastate conflict, the UN was increasingly asked to tackle complex civilian tasks. These went beyond the limited role of liaising with political actors and the “good offices” work that had characterized civilian peacekeepers until that point. Cedric Thornberry, the first Director of Civil Affairs in a UN mission (UNPROFOR in 1992), described this new broader role as follows:

To fully understand the UN’s meaning of “civil affairs” it is first important to appreciate that most of the missions created between 1989 and 1992, especially, were qualitatively different from those which had preceded. It is not just that most were a lot bigger … they were to fulfil many roles additional to the archetypal ones of the 1947-1988 period. The task of the UN became, not merely to observe, but actively, itself, to bring about peace […] In a rapid sequence of major operations – principally in Namibia, Central America and Cambodia – the UN was required not only to make peace, but to conduct nationwide processes of reconstruction and national reconciliation. Their task was, in broad terms, to harmonize or unify deeply divided societies, long racked by war, and to establish democracy where previously there had been tyranny.

These key themes of helping to unify divided societies and helping states to exert legitimate authority are central to the continuing role of civil affairs today.

During the 1990s small civil affairs components were included in a number of missions, including those in Cyprus, Tajikistan and Georgia. At the end of that decade, major civil affairs components were deployed to Kosovo and East Timor, to implement the executive mandates that were given to peacekeeping operations at that time. In these cases civil affairs components found themselves mandated to establish effective administrations and to support capacity-building for self-government.

The start of the 2000s saw a surge in the deployment of large civil affairs components to peacekeeping missions. Each one had its own unique focus and contribution to make in implementing peace mandates at the local level, but each was there to strengthen links to ordinary citizens, as well as to support the development of social conditions conducive to peace and provide an overall facilitation role locally.

=== Civil Affairs into the Next Decade ===
In 2008, for the first time, the UN Departments of Peacekeeping Operations and Field Support developed and disseminated a policy directive that defines and conceptualizes the diverse work of civil affairs. This has provided the foundation for the development of this Handbook, as well as training and recruitment profiles to ensure that civil affairs components are strong, well-trained and well planned, ready to address the challenges ahead.

This institutional framework will need to continue to evolve and develop in response to analysis of the ongoing shifts in the global security environment. The World Bank's World Development Report 2011, for example, found that many countries are caught in a mutually reinforcing cycle of violence and poverty. It also found that more and more people are suffering from violence that is linked to lack of governance and rule of law, rather than to outright war. These changes in the global security environment have resulted in mandates increasingly requiring higher levels of civilian engagement on a wide variety of thematic and cross-cutting issues, ranging from governance, rule of law and institution-building through to early peacebuilding and protection of civilians from threats of violence.

For peacekeeping, of particular note among these emerging issues is the protection of civilians, which has increasingly become a major part of the international discourse around intervention. This was demonstrated in the international dialogue on both Libyan Arab Jamahiriya and Ivory Coast in early 2011 and earlier in the Democratic Republic of the Congo (DRC) and Darfur. Protection of civilians has also increasingly become a specific mandated task, after inclusion in eight UN peacekeeping mandates by the Security Council. It can be expected that civil affairs will be at the forefront of an integrated and coordinated approach to mandate delivery on this issue, in terms of civilian and government engagement on the ground.

Meanwhile, as many peacekeeping operations mandated as part of a surge during the 2000s are starting to draw down their military presence, the UN continues to evolve, transitioning towards an increased focus on the civilian dimension of ”peacebuilding” and its role in avoidance of a return to conflict. Here, civil affairs has a key role to play – within both peacekeeping and political missions – by ensuring that efforts to mitigate conflict drivers and to engage and support local government and communities have meaning on the ground outside the capitals in which the UN is deployed. A continued focus on local presence in these contexts is key if the UN is to ensure that its work genuinely responds to the priorities and concerns of ordinary citizens within post-conflict countries, thereby helping to ensure their consent and to create durable conditions for peace.

These evolving roles, and the range of partners working in related fields and capacities, all create the need – and potential – for increased partnership and cooperation, to ensure that mandate aims progress effectively. Similarly, as these complex and multidimensional trends for the UN response to conflict emerge, the identification and provision of appropriate and available resources to respond to them effectively must also evolve. As indicated in the report of the Senior Advisory Group on Civilian capacity in the aftermath of conflict, these challenges will require a nimble, harmonized and, where necessary, specialized civilian response, as well as a focus on partnership across organizations such as the World Bank, United Nations Development Programme (UNDP) and regional organizations such as the African Union (AU).

One of the major issues identified in the review of civilian capacities is the need to be able to better identify and support national capacities. As the review states: “The United Nations has seen success in humanitarian operations and peacekeeping, built on a strong partnership with Member States. But the international community has had less success in supporting and enabling the national capacities that are essential for an enduring peace.”19 Civil affairs components have a key role to play in identifying and supporting national capacities, within civil society and local government, including through helping to ensure that voices from the local level are heard in nationally led peacebuilding processes.

Overall, in the evolving environment of international peace and security, a key asset of civil affairs components is their agility and their capacity to respond flexibly to the wide range of demands and expectations within Security Council mandates. One aspect of this flexibility is their ability to direct their focus depending on the availability and presence of other international partners at the local level, particularly those with expertise in highly specialized areas. Civil Affairs can play an important role in mobilizing these partners in places and at times where they are most needed. This is a cost-efficient model, given the prohibitive and unnecessary expense of having a full complement of specialized expertise available in each locality around the country at all times. It also helps to ensure that local-level support is need-driven, rather than simply provided because a particular service or resource happens to be available.

Civil Affairs can be expected to remain at the forefront of the UN response to conflict, and to building the processes, structures, relationships and trust required to assist countries and communities to break the cycle of violence.

=== Core Role 1: Cross-mission representation, monitoring and facilitation at the local level ===
Cross-mission representation, monitoring and facilitation are performed in most missions and usually throughout the life cycle of the mission. In many situations civil affairs is the most important interface between the UN mission and the community, not just in terms of the local/regional authorities but also civil society in its broadest sense. Through its multiple interactions with the local population, civil affairs provides the mission with the pulse of the nation beyond the high-level contacts with government and political party leadership. This helps to nuance the mission's understanding of the sociopolitical climate, allowing analysis to move beyond the carefully articulated positions of national spokespeople and representatives, and to ensure that regional and local considerations are integrated into national negotiations or priority-setting processes.

In return, local communities and groups have an opportunity through Civil Affairs to access the mission, which they may perceive as distant and militarized. Civil Affairs can be a bridge, which means that groups who previously would not have dared to approach the heavily guarded mission gates and ask for a discussion with the mission field leadership, civilian or military, can now approach the UN as guests rather than supplicants. The mission is inevitably enriched by this kind of dialogue and Civil Affairs Officers are often the best facilitators of it.

=== Core Role 2: Conflict management, confidence-building and support to the development of political space ===
Conflict management, confidence-building and supporting the development of political space are integral to UN peacekeeping and central to Civil Affairs work. Through this role, Civil Affairs actively supports the development of social and civic conditions conducive to sustainable peace, and promotes popular engagement and confidence in the peace process. While often the lead component in this area of work, Civil Affairs usually undertakes these activities in partnership with other mission components, as well as UN agencies and local and international partners. Within the mission, police and military components and other civilian components, such as political affairs, public information and human rights, may all contribute in one way or another to objectives in this area.

=== Core Role 3: Support to the restoration and extension of state authority ===
Restoration of state authority is increasingly recognized as a key element of the stabilization of fragile states and a critical requirement for keeping and building peace. This is clearly reflected in many of the recent UN Security Council resolutions including, for example, Security Council resolution 1974 (2011), which calls for the Government of Afghanistan “to improve governance” and “to pursue continued legislative and public administration reform in order to ensure good governance”. In the case of Haiti, meanwhile, Security Council resolution 1892 (2009) “calls upon MINUSTAH, consistent with its mandate, to continue such support to strengthen self-sustaining state institutions, especially outside Port-au-Prince, including through the provision of specialized expertise to key ministries and institutions”.

In exceptional circumstances, the Security Council has also authorized peacekeeping missions to temporarily assume the administrative and legislative functions of the state through provision of a transitional administration, as was the case in Kosovo and TimorLeste. However, it is important to emphasize the specificity of the circumstances under which these two missions were established and the fact that executive mandates are generally seen as a last resort in situations where a territory is virtually deprived of any functioning state institutions.

== U.S. Army Civil Affairs, followed by other branches ==
A civil affairs soldier with the 411th Civil Affairs Battalion assesses the reconstruction of sewage lines in Baghdad June 11, 2003.

According to the U.S. Army, "The force that the Army employs to compete and win within the population is Civil Affairs." With their knowledge of governance and diplomacy, Civil Affairs soldiers are the principal experts in assisting a commander on the conduct of civil-military operations, and the sole force trained and tasked to conduct Civil Affairs Operations.

All Active Component Army Civil Affairs personnel undergo rigorous assessment and selection, followed by extensive training in foreign languages, advanced survivability skills, and negotiations techniques in order to operate autonomously as a small team, in any kind of environment, to achieve strategic end states. A Civil Affairs Team of 2 to 4 soldiers will often be the only U.S. military personnel in an entire country, working for the U.S. ambassador as well as their military chain of command.

Reserve Component Civil Affairs personnel assist heavy and light forces in post-conflict stabilization.

The fundamental role of Civil Affairs forces is to build networks of formal and informal leaders to accomplish important missions in diplomatically or politically sensitive areas. SOF Civil Affairs operate as reconnaissance elements within the population, performing their core task of Civil Reconnaissance. Civil Information Management, Helping to provide Foreign Humanitarian Assistance, and Nation Assistance. They achieve effects by conducting Civil Engagements, applying knowledge of governance, economics, and politics to affect human behavior in the context of military operations or in support of strategic objectives.

=== History of US Military Civil Affairs ===
Throughout U.S. history the U.S. Army was involved in Civil Affairs and civic action. Civil Affairs has its organizational origins in military governments that were and are established when a country is occupied during war, but also encompasses the wide variety of mission sets focused on or leveraging the broader population of a given area in times of peace or war.

=== United States Army ===
Civil Affairs has a lineage that traces back to Lewis and Clark's Corps of Discovery. U.S. Army Civil Affairs forces are split between the Active and Reserve components.

==== Active Component Civil Affairs ====
Why the 95th Civil Affairs (a 1st Special Forces Command recruiting video)? (3:16)

Approximately 10% of Army Civil Affairs personnel are active component soldiers assigned to the 95th Civil Affairs Brigade, the 83rd Civil Affairs Battalion or a variety of Special Operations, Joint, diplomatic, or conventional Army staff, planning, and policy positions. Active Component Civil Affairs soldiers are assessed, selected, and trained to conduct Civil Affairs Operations in hostile or austere environments in any stage of conflict.

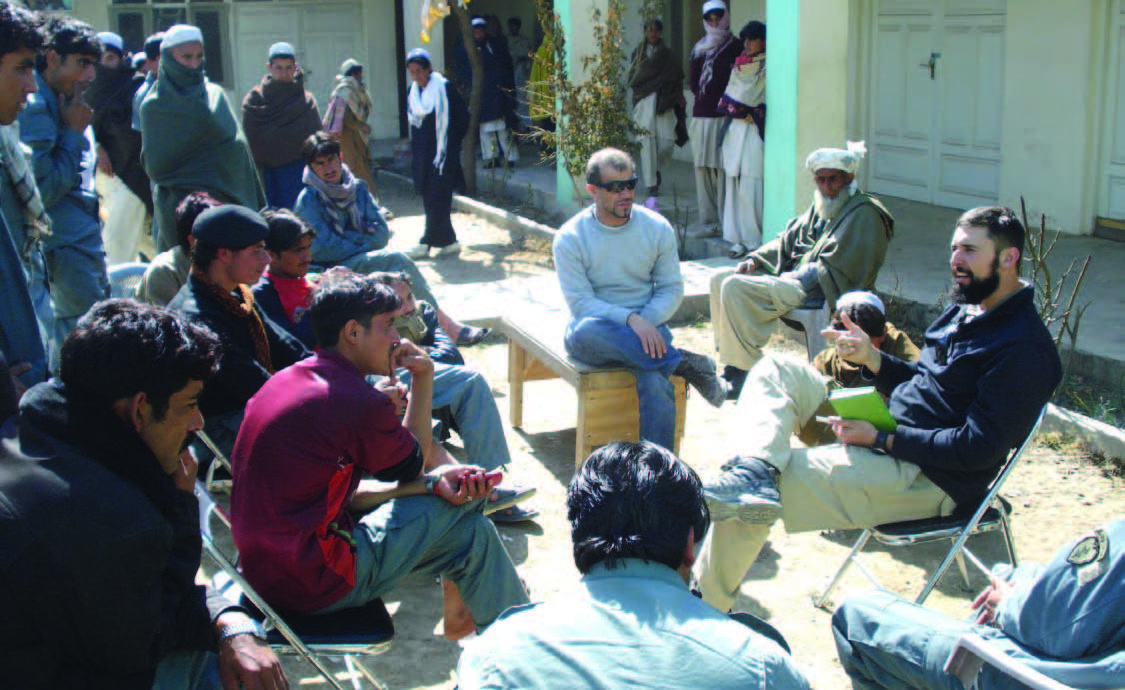
Civil Affairs officer speaking with local inhabitants during Operation Enduring Freedom, in Afghanistan.

The 95th Civil Affairs Brigade and its five subordinate battalions are all stationed at Fort Bragg, North Carolina, which is a rapidly deployable unit that only supports the Army Special Operations Command. Each of the five battalions is regionally aligned to one of the five U.S. combatant commands; SOUTHCOM, CENTCOM, EUCOM, AFRICOM and INDOPACOM. The Civil Affairs soldiers in these units receive extensive language and regional instruction as part of their training pathway and are assigned to the battalion affiliated with the respective region they are trained for. Once these soldiers arrive to their assigned units they receive advanced training in a variety of fields, preparing them for the enhanced level of responsibility that they will have working on small, autonomous teams.

The 83rd Civil Affairs Battalion is one of the few battalions in the Army with a global mission set. Falling under the command of the U.S. Army XVIII Airborne Corps and located at Fort Bragg, North Carolina, the battalion provides support to special operations and conventional military missions in all five combatant commands, as well as diplomatic, interagency, and foreign partner organizations. As Active Component Civil Affairs soldiers, personnel assigned to the battalion undergo the same rigorous selection and advanced training as those in the 95th Civil Affairs Brigade, and individuals will often rotate between both units.

All active civil affairs battalions are a component of the U.S. special operations forces.

===== Reserve Component Civil Affairs =====
Approximately 90% of the Army Civil Affairs personnel come from the reserves and usually support active duty Army units. Using reservists allows military commanders to utilize skills of soldiers with experience in professions needed to manage and restore civilian areas impacted by military operations. This includes lawyers, city managers, economists, veterinarians, teachers, policemen, and other occupations who have valuable skills in restoration of governance and essential services in a war torn area. As a result, they deploy with certifications and experiences that become difficult to duplicate by the active duty forces. Additionally, reserve civil affairs planners attend the stability, security, and development in complex operations course taught at the Naval Postgraduate School in Monterey, California.

Reserve Civil Affairs units assigned to United States Army Civil Affairs and Psychological Operations Command (Airborne) are task organized in four reserve Civil Affairs Commands (CACOMs) which integrate at the strategic and operational level with theater commands and joint/combined task forces. Civil Affairs brigades comprise these CACOMS and integrate at the corps. At the tactical level, maneuver divisions are augmented by the Civil Affairs battalions. The four CACOMs are the 350th CACOM, the 351st CACOM, the 352nd CACOM, and the 353rd CACOM.

Two other Army Reserve Civil Affairs units are assigned to other theaters of operation. The 322nd Civil Affairs Brigade is based in Hawaii and falls under operational control of United States Army Pacific Command and the 9th Mission Support Command. The 361st Civil Affairs Brigade is based in Germany and falls under operational control of United States Army Europe and the 7th Mission Support Command.

Within the United States Army, reserve civil affairs units are administered through United States Army Civil Affairs and Psychological Operations Command (Airborne), or USACAPOC(A), a subordinate of U.S. Army Reserve Command. USACAPOC(A) contains Psychological Operations (PO) and Civil Affairs (CA) units, consisting of Army Reserve elements. USACAPOC(A) was founded in 1985. It is headquartered at Fort Bragg.

On 1 October 2006, USACAPOC(A) realigned from the United States Army Special Operations Command (USASOC) to the United States Army Reserve Command (USARC). Training and doctrine relating to USACAPOC(A) is provided by the United States Army John Fitzgerald Kennedy Special Warfare Center and School (USAJFKSWCS) at Fort Bragg, NC.

===== U.S. Army Civil Affairs training =====
- Reserve Civil Affairs
  - Initial Entry Training (IET)

Upon completion of basic training, a Soldier slotted in a Civil Affairs Unit will attend the 10-week Civil Affairs Advanced Individual Training (AIT) course. The 5th Battalion of the 1st Special Warfare Training Group (Airborne) is responsible for the training. Both Civil Affairs and Psychological Operations trainees are assigned to Alpha Company. Upon completion of the 10-week course, (the original 13-week course was lengthened to 15 weeks in 2008, then shortened to 10 weeks in 2010) the student will be able to interpret U.S. and foreign maps; conduct civil, governmental, humanitarian, and defense assistance; apply organizational and leadership skills required in field operations; and conduct research on documents and other aspects of urban and regional studies. The instruction is conducted by lecture, discussion, and practical exercises such as map reading, land navigation, communications, and civil affairs planning.

- Reserve enlisted soldiers who reclassify to Civil Affairs must attend the Civil Affairs Reclassification Course which is offered at several posts throughout the country. Currently, training for combat, combat support, and combat service support is organized through regional training commands. The six Civil Affairs schoolhouses report to the 3rd Brigade (CA/PO) 100th Division, located at Fort Totten, New York. These units are the 5th Battalion (CA), 95th Regiment, of Lubbock, Texas; 5th Battalion (CA), 98th Regiment of Fort Dix, New Jersey; the 12th Battalion (CA), 100th Regiment of Fort Knox, Kentucky; the 4th Battalion (CA), 104th Regiment, of Mountain View, California; 108th Regiment of Fort Bragg, North Carolina.

The American Council on Education recommends college credit be awarded in the lower-division associate's or baccalaureate category: two semester hours in map-reading, three in public administration, and one in military science for this training. The soldier is awarded the Military Occupational Specialty designation of 38B10. All Active Component enlisted will attend airborne school and language school, while Reservists may attend these courses at a later date through their units.

- Active Component Civil Affairs

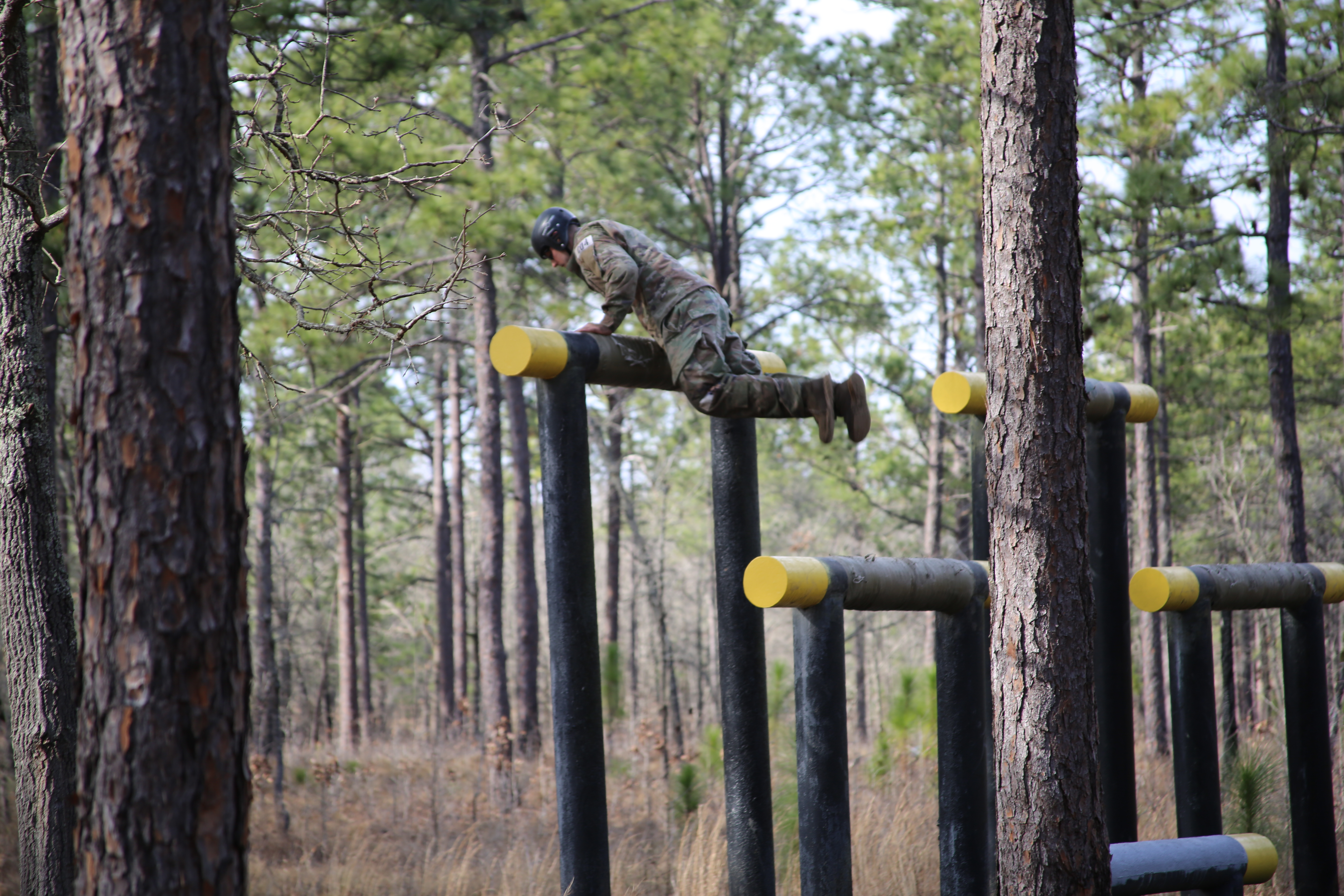
Civil Affairs candidate navigates an obstacle course at Civil Affairs Assessment and Selection.

Active Component enlisted Soldiers and officers in the rank of specialist, sergeant, and staff sergeant or 1LT and CPT who have a valid security clearance must attend and pass a rigorous selection and assessment course at Camp Mackall, NC. Those soldiers selected for Civil Affairs must attend the 48-week Qualification Course. During this course, Soldiers received advanced training in reconnaissance, diplomacy, foreign languages, and survival, with the option of attending the Special Operations Medic Course, culminating in a large-scale training exercise that exposes students to realistic operational situations and environmental elements. Upon graduating into the operating force, Civil Affairs soldiers continue their advanced training between missions, advanced survival courses, higher-level planning courses, enhanced language training, non-standard weapons courses, off-road mobility and evasive driving courses, and many others from within the Special Operations community and across the interagency field of government.

=== United States Marine Corps ===
The Marine Corps currently has three permanent CA units: 1st Civil Affairs Group (1st CAG), 3d CAG and 4th CAG, all in the Force Headquarters Group of the Marine Forces Reserve. 2nd CAG was stood up in 2013 and was reflagged as a Marine Corps Advisor Company in 2019. The 5th Civil Affairs Group and 6th CAG were created provisionally in 2005-06 for Operation Iraqi Freedom, but each were stood down after one deployment to Iraq. Artillery units augmented by Marines from the CAGs also deployed to Iraq and Afghanistan in 2006-07 to serve in a civil affairs capacity. In 2010, the Marine Corps added an active duty civil affairs detachment at each of the three Marine Expeditionary Forces. The Marine Corps assigns civil affairs as a primary military specialty for enlisted and additional specialty for officers. The Marine Corps uses its own civil affairs doctrine and runs the Marine Corps Civil-Military Operations School (MCCMOS) at Marine Corps Base Quantico to train civil affairs Marines. MCCMOS also has career progression courses and MOSs for CMO Planners (officers) and CMO Chiefs (SNCOs). Additionally MCCMOS has a Stability Assessment Framework Course and a Civil Affairs Integration Course.

=== United States Navy ===
The Navy Expeditionary Combat Command (NECC) officially established its newest command, Maritime Civil Affairs Group (MCAG) during a ceremony at Naval Amphibious Base Little Creek on 30 March 2007. In an effort to consolidate staffs and resources, CNO Notice 5400 of 9 July 2009 redesignated MCAG and Expeditionary Training Groups as Maritime Civil Affairs and Security Training (MCAST) Command and relocated the command to Virginia Beach. MCAST Command officially stood up 1 October 2009.

Maritime Civil Affairs Teams (MCATs) lessen the impact of military operations imposed during peace and periods of declared war, and increase the impact of humanitarian civil assistance (HCA) and contingency operations in support of theater security cooperation plans.

MCA forces provide assistance with the restoration of local infrastructure in the aftermath of military operations, natural and man-made disasters and regional engagement activities in order to achieve shared mutual interests.

In order to maximize its effectiveness, each deployed MCAT is regionally focused and trained with the necessary language skills and cultural awareness. The teams are responsible for streamlining and coordinating the efforts of the Department of Defense, Department of State, and the United States Agency for International Development (USAID).

Each Maritime Civil Affairs sailor is responsible for shaping the regional perception of the U.S. and gaining the support of the local populace, preventing it from being influenced by forces of instability, such as terrorism, piracy, crime and natural disaster.

MCASTC has been disestablished.

=== United States Air Force ===
The Air Force has deployed units in support of Operation Iraqi Freedom that have directly integrated into Army Civil Affairs Battalions. Such units include the 16th Squadron, 732nd Expeditionary Air Wing (Civil Affairs/Public Works) which was assigned to the 411th Civil Affairs Battalion. During the 402nd Civil Affairs Battalion deployment to Iraq in April 2006 to April 2007, members of the United States Air Force provided Airmen for logistical support for Headquarters and Headquarters Company (HHC) and for the Provincial Reconstruction Teams throughout their area of operations.

=== Other organizations ===
==== New York State Guard ====
In the New York State Guard, one of approximately 25 states with state defense forces, (not to be confused with the New York Army National Guard), the term 'Civil Affairs' has a slightly different connotation. The Civil Affairs units include lawyers, judges, engineers, doctors and other professionals and paraprofessionals committed to voluntary, part-time military service in support of the New York National Guard and U.S. Military Reserve Units from all branches. When soldiers are called up for duty, the New York Guard makes sure their legal needs are attended to so that they can serve with the peace of mind of knowing that their affairs are in order. Civil Affairs soldiers draft their wills, prepare powers of attorney and other necessary documents, and advise them of their rights as soldiers under federal law and as citizens of the United States. There are five units, one in each brigade of the Guard, including the 5th Civil Affairs Regiment, Yonkers, New York; 7th Civil Affairs Regiment, New York City; 13th Civil Affairs Regiment, Garden City, New York; 23rd Civil Affairs Regiment, Latham, New York; and the 209th Civil Affairs Regiment, Buffalo, New York.

== Civil affairs worldwide ==
=== United Kingdom ===
The British Army has a Civil Affairs Group, formed in 1997 and consisting primarily of Territorial Army personnel. Most personnel are members of the Royal Engineers and the group is administered by the Central Volunteer Headquarters Royal Engineers (CVHQ RE), based at Gibraltar Barracks, in Minley, Surrey. Members of the group have been deployed operationally in Bosnia, Kosovo, Albania, Macedonia, East Timor, Sierra Leone, Afghanistan and Iraq. In Afghanistan, the tactical level unit was called Military Stabilisation Support Team, and they usually worked for the Provincial Reconstruction Team.

The British Army first formed CA units in 1943, and by August 1944 there were 3,600 CA personnel in France with the 21st Army Group.

=== The Netherlands ===
The Royal Netherlands Army's Civil Affairs unit is 1 CIMIC Battalion. The staff consist of regular soldiers. Other personnel are reservists with a civilian occupation. Members of the battalion have been deployed to Bosnia; Macedonia; Africa and Afghanistan. The unit is, as of early 2009, based in Apeldoorn.

== Civil affairs in popular media ==
- A Bell for Adano (Pulitzer Prize winning novel by John Hersey) and its adaptation A Bell for Adano (movie) depict a U.S. military government officer in occupied Italy during World War II.
- The Teahouse of the August Moon (novel), and its adaptations The Teahouse of the August Moon (play) and The Teahouse of the August Moon (film), depict U.S. military government personnel in occupied Okinawa during World War II. These were also adapted into the 1970 musical Lovely Ladies, Kind Gentlemen.
- Three Kings (1999 film) the characters Barlow, Vig, and Elgin wear the USACAPOC patch, and Barlow identifies himself as a Civil Affairs Reservist.
