= White Plains, Maryland =

Unincorporated community in Maryland, United States

- Unincorporated community
- Location within the state of Maryland White Plains (the United States)
- Coordinates: 38°35′25″N 76°56′26″W
- Country: United States
- State: Maryland
- County: Charles
- Elevation: 197 ft (60 m)
- Time zone: UTC-5 (Eastern (EST))
  - Summer (DST): UTC-4 (EDT)
- GNIS feature ID: 591545

White Plains is an unincorporated community in Charles County, Maryland, in the United States, just south of Waldorf. It is at latitude 38°35'25" N, longitude 76°56'26" W. The United States Postal Service has assigned White Plains the ZIP Code 20695. The commercial portion of White Plains lies along U.S. Route 301. The area is experiencing population sprawl from the adjacent unincorporated communities of Waldorf and St. Charles and features new office parks and a scenic new rail trail. The Charles County Department of Health is headquartered in White Plains, and a public golf course is also there. Plans to complete an east–west connector road in the area were mired in controversy because of alleged adverse effects on the environment.

The historic home Spye Park was listed on the National Register of Historic Places in 1990.

== See also ==
- Bryans Road, Maryland
