= 318th Psychological Operations Company =

United States Army Reserve psychological operations unit

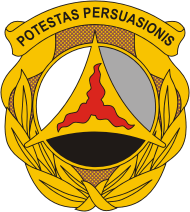
- 10th Psychological Operations Battalion (POB) - St. Louis, Missouri
- Active: By 1990–present
- Country: United States
- Branch: United States Army Reserve
- Type: Psychological operations
- Size: Company
- Part of: 10th Psychological Operations Battalion; 7th Psychological Operations Group
- Garrison/HQ: Jefferson Barracks Military Post, Missouri
- Engagements: Gulf War; Iraq War

The 318th Psychological Operations Company (318th POC) is a tactical psychological operations unit of the United States Army Reserve based at Jefferson Barracks Military Post in Missouri. The company is assigned to the 10th Psychological Operations Battalion, which is subordinate to the 7th Psychological Operations Group.

Prior to the current numerical designation, the St. Louis, Missouri -based unit was known as the 18th Psychological Operations Company (Tactical) (Direct Support), abbreviated 18th POC (TAC)(DS).The 18th POC operated during Operation Desert Shield and Operation Desert Storm, and the company was designated as the 318th POC.

== Organization ==
The 318th POC forms part of the Army Reserve's tactical psychological operations structure. Tactical psychological operations companies provide commanders with personnel trained in target-audience analysis, product development, face-to-face communication, media dissemination and loudspeaker operations.

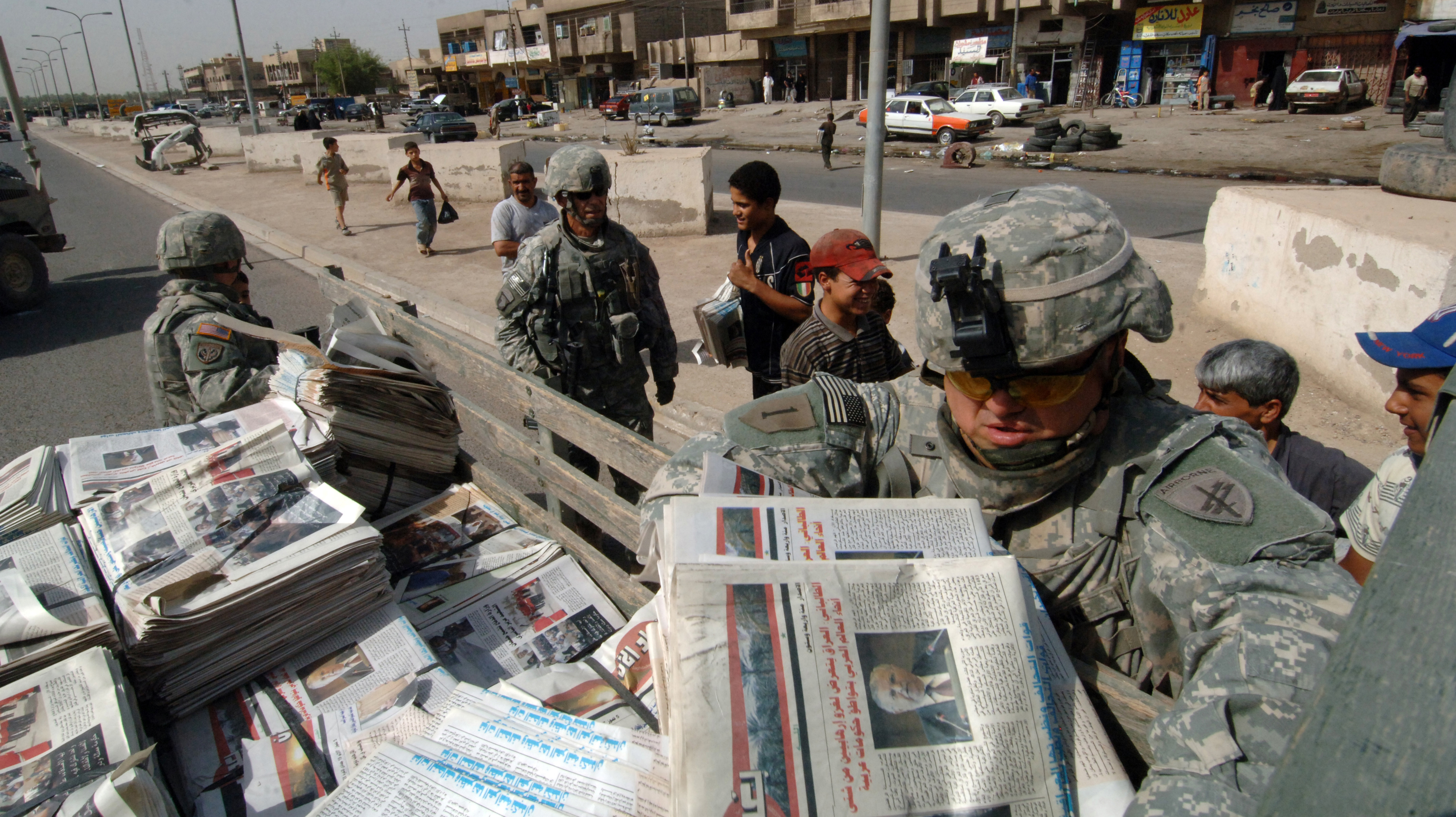
Soldiers of Detachment 1080, 318th Psychological Operations Company, distribute Baghdad Now in East Rashid, Baghdad, in July 2007.

Its parent organization, the 10th Psychological Operations Battalion, was constituted in the Regular Army in November 1967 and activated in Vietnam the following month. The battalion was inactivated in 1971, allotted to the Army Reserve and reactivated at St. Louis on 30 October 1975.

== History ==
=== Gulf War ===
In December 1990, the company was based in St. Louis and designated the 18th Psychological Operations Company. Following the expansion of American forces assigned to Operation Desert Shield, the United States Army selected the 18th and four other Army Reserve psychological operations companies to provide tactical loudspeaker detachments.

The 18th POC provided a 15-member detachment consisting of four three-person loudspeaker teams, an officer in charge, a noncommissioned officer in charge and a maintenance specialist. Fort Bragg, North Carolina, served as the detachment's mobilization station. The soldiers completed deployment validation and prepared their vehicles and loudspeaker equipment before departing Pope Air Force Base for Saudi Arabia on 13 January 1991.

During Operation Desert Storm, personnel from the 18th were incorporated into the approximately 70 psychological operations loudspeaker teams distributed among United States and coalition formations. These teams broadcast prerecorded and interpreter-delivered messages intended to encourage Iraqi forces to cease resistance and surrender.

=== Bosnia ===
Personnel from the 18th POC mobilized for Operation Joint Endeavor following the signing of the Dayton Agreement in December 1995. Major Thomas Bergman of the 18th commanded three tactical psychological operations teams in Bosnia and Herzegovina. Two supported military-police battalions operating around Tuzla and Lukavac, while another supported the Nordic–Polish brigade in Doboj.

The broader NATO psychological operations campaign was intended to explain the peace agreement, reduce interference with NATO operations and encourage cooperation by the former warring factions. It employed radio, television, newspapers, leaflets, posters and face-to-face communication.

The company was subsequently identified as the 318th Psychological Operations Company. During the 10th POB's 1998 Bosnia rotation, personnel from the 318th and other Army Reserve companies were consolidated into a division psychological operations support element assigned to the American-led Multinational Division North. Publicly available Army lineage records do not identify the precise date or order under which the 18th POC became the 318th POC.

=== Later operations ===
The Company deployed to Iraq as part of Operation Iraqi Freedom.

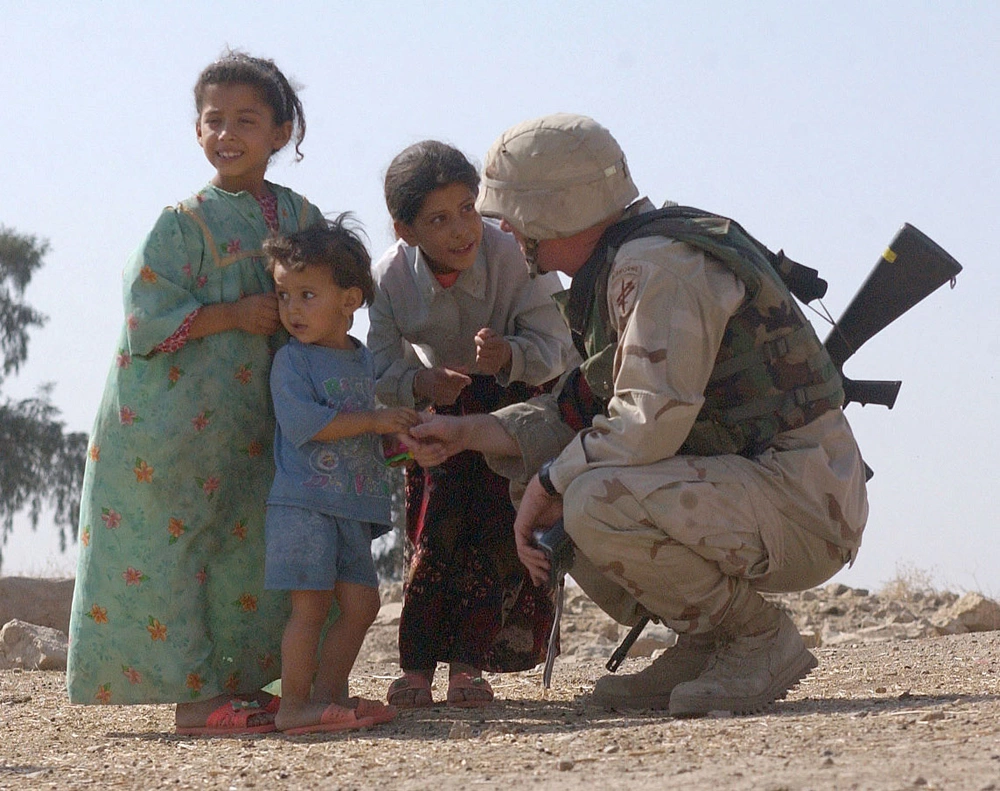
Sgt. David Kellogg of the 318th (PSYOPS) Psychological Operations Battalion, a reserve unit out of Jefferson Barracks St. Louis, Miss., attached to the 101st Airborne Division (Air Assault), plays with Iraqi children

In 2009 318th Psyop Company participated in Operation Enduring Freedom. The group worked on leaflet campaigns, and insurgent misdirection.\

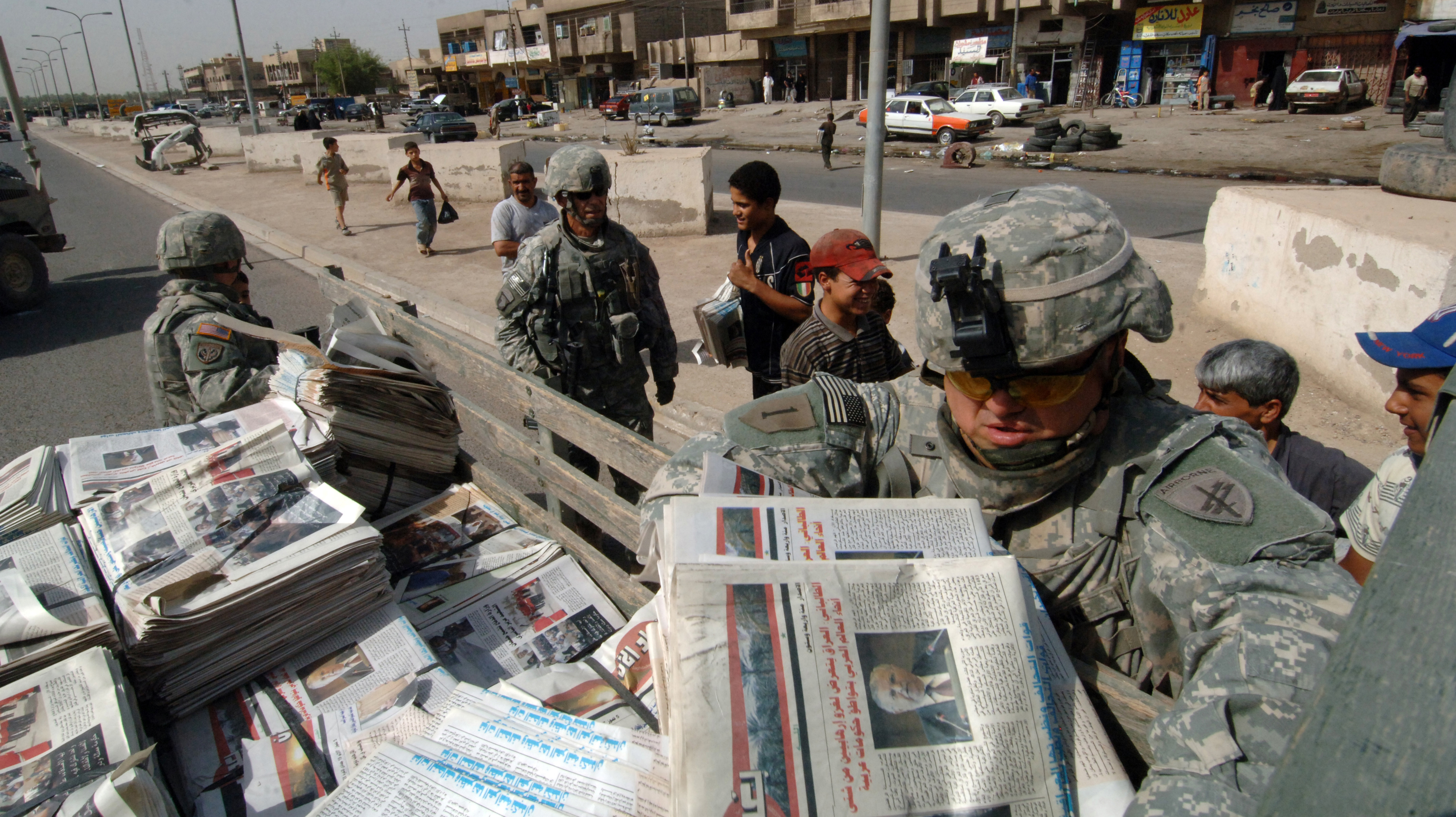
Soldiers of Detachment 1080, 318th Psychological Operations Company, distribute Baghdad Now in East Rashid, Baghdad, in July 2007.

Elements of the 318th subsequently served in Iraq. In April 2010, a tactical psychological operations detachment from the company conducted joint patrols with the 1st Battalion, 377th Field Artillery Regiment and the Iraqi Army in Basra Province. Company personnel met community and tribal leaders and distributed cards containing emergency-response information intended to connect residents with Iraqi security-force call centers.

In 2014, members of the company participated in Beyond the Horizon in Guatemala as part of Task Force Oso. The unit conducted face-to-face engagements with residents of Los Limones in support of medical, dental and engineering activities undertaken by United States and Guatemalan organizations.

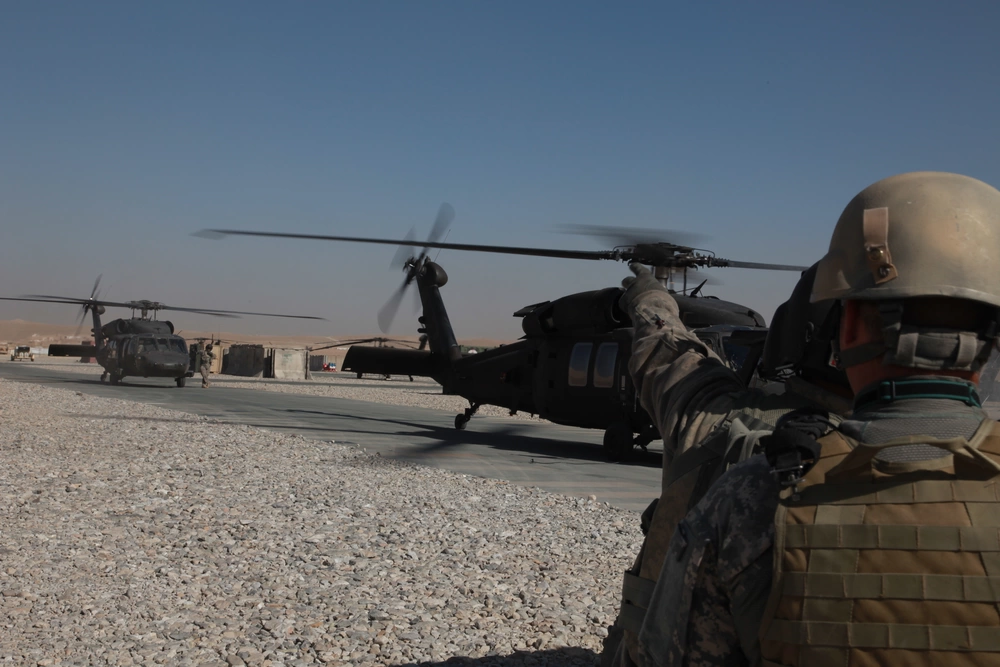
318th Psyop Company, prepare to board a Black Hawk helicopter in Logar Province, Afghanistan, October 23, 2009.

The company remains based at Jefferson Barracks as a subordinate unit of the 10th Psychological Operations Battalion.

== See also ==
- Psychological operations (United States)
- United States Army Civil Affairs and Psychological Operations Command
- 7th Psychological Operations Group
- Gulf War
- Operation Joint Endeavor
