= 7th Psychological Operations Group =

7th Psychological Operations Group (A)
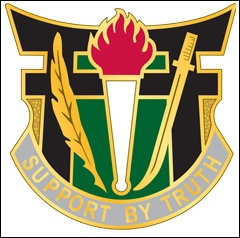
- 7th PSYOP Group (A) Distinctive Unit Insignia
- Active: 19 August 1965 – 30 June 1974; 30 October 1975 – present
- Country: United States
- Branch: United States Army
- Type: U.S. Army Reserve
- Role: PSYOP
- Part of: U.S. Army Civil Affairs and Psychological Operations Command (USACAPOC)
- Garrison/HQ: Moffett Field, California
- Motto: "Support by Truth"

Commanders
- Current commander: COL Gregory Baugh

Insignia
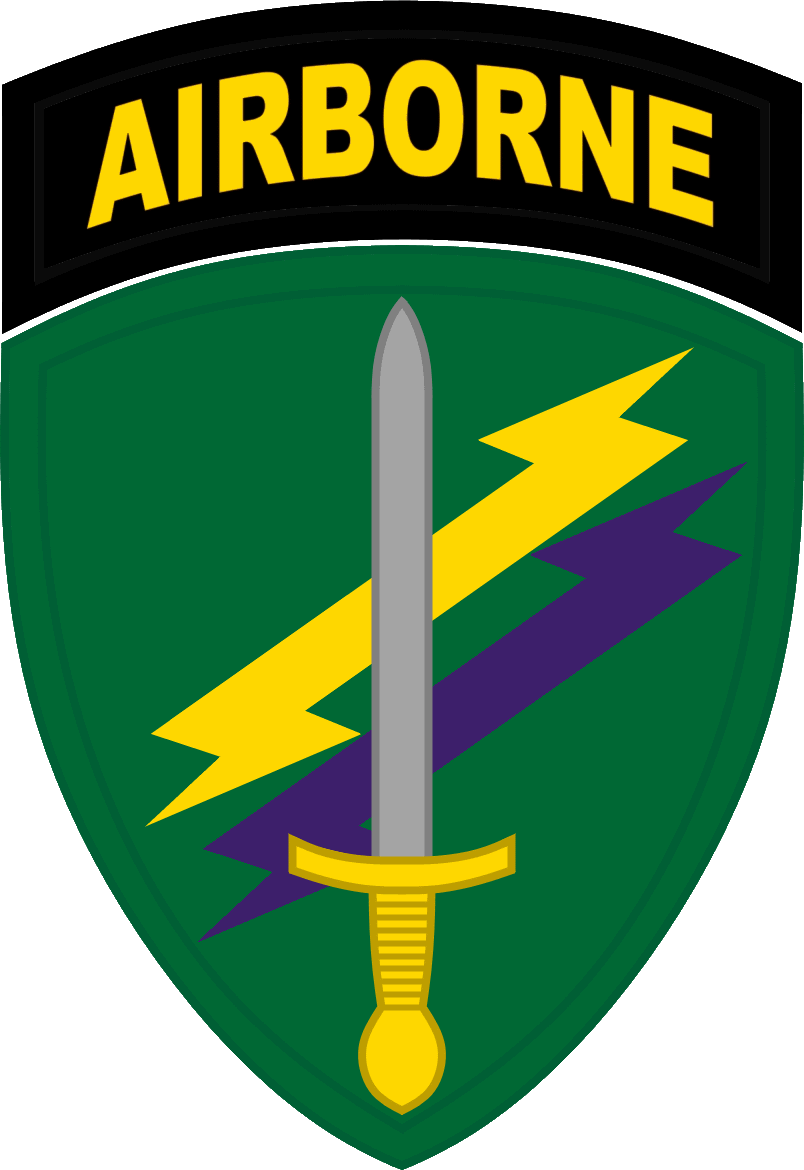
- USACAPOC Shoulder Sleeve Insignia worn by all subordinate units

The 7th Psychological Operations Group (Airborne) is a psychological operations (PSYOP) unit of the United States Army Reserve. Organized in 1965, it was a successor to United States Army Broadcasting and Visual Activity, Pacific. It is currently based at Moffett Field, California.

Constituted 19 August 1965 in the Regular Army as the 7th Psychological Operations Group. Activated 20 October 1965 on Okinawa. Inactivated 30 June 1974 at Fort Bragg, North Carolina. Redesignated 30 October 1975 as Headquarters and Headquarters Detachment, 7th Psychological Operations Group; concurrently withdrawn from the Regular Army, allotted to the Army Reserve, and activated at the Presidio of San Francisco, California. Reorganized and redesignated 18 September 1990 as Headquarters and Headquarters Company, 7th Psychological Operations Group. Location changed 15 September 1994 to Moffett Field, California.

Within the psychological operations battalions, there are a number of tactical psychological operations companies. Such companies are organized in the same manner as other Tactical Psychological Operations Companies Army wide. It consists of a Headquarters Section, a Tactical PSYOP Development Detachment or TPDD and three Tactical PSYOP Detachments or TPD. The TPDD focuses on Product Development and Target Audience Analysis while the TPD usually focuses on product distribution, face to face engagement with a given target audience and loudspeaker operations.

Battalion	Distinctive Unit Insignia	History
10th Psychological Operations Battalion (Tactical) (Airborne		10th Psychological Operations Battalion (Tactical) (Airborne), at Jefferson Barracks Military Post (MO) TF-10 deployed to Iraq as an organic USAR BN in 2007, part of OIF V. Supported 25 ID and 10 MTN. Deployed to Afghanistan in 2009.: 307th Psychological Operations Company, at Jefferson Barracks Military Post (MO); Deployed to Iraq in 2003, part of OIF 1. Supported 3rd MEF. Deployed to Iraq in 2004, supported 1st CAV and 3rd ID, Operation Iraqi Freedom Deployed to Iraq in 2007, Operation Iraqi Freedom (OIF 07-08) Detachment 1020 deployed with Task Force 10, supported 2nd ID and 1/504th Parachute Infantry Regiment in Baghdad, Iraq Deployed to Afghanistan in 2010. Operation Enduring Freedom (OEF 10-12). Detachment 1010 supported 1-506th Infantry, 101st Airborne Division in Paktika Province, Sharana: 308th Psychological Operations Company (Tactical) (Airborne), in Belton (MO); Deployed to Iraq in 2007 Deployed to Iraq in 2010. (Two detachments with the 17th Psychological Operations Battalion) Deployed to Afghanistan in 2010. (One detachment with 17th Psychological Operations Battalion): 318th Psychological Operations Company (Tactical) (Airborne), at Jefferson Barracks Military Post (MO); Deployed to Saudi Arabia in 1991 (as the 18th PSYOP CO (TAC)(DS)) in support of Desert Shield/Storm. Attached to 1st Infantry Div. Deployed to Iraq in 2003, part of OIF 1. Attached to 101st ABN Div. Deployed to Iraq in 2007. Deployed to Afghanistan in 2009.: 362nd Psychological Operations Company (Tactical) (Airborne), in Bentonville (AR); Deployed to Iraq in support of OIF 03 Deployed to Iraq in support of OIF 04-05 Deployed to Afghanistan in support of OEF 06-07 Deployed to Iraq in support of OIF 09-10 Moved from 16th Psychological Operations Battalion to 10th Psychological Operations Battalion in 2009 Deployed to Djibouti in 2012-2013
12th Psychological Operations Battalion (Tactical) (Airborne)		12th Psychological Operations Battalion (Tactical) (Airborne), at Joint Base Lewis–McChord (WA); Deployed to Afghanistan in 2006.: 320th Psychological Operations Company (Tactical) (Airborne), at Camp Withycombe (OR); Deployed to Afghanistan in 2004. Deployed to Iraq in 2008 Deployed to Afghanistan in 2012.: 324th Psychological Operations Company (Tactical) (Airborne), in Aurora (CO); Deployed to Iraq in 2004 during the second year of Operation Iraqi Freedom (OIF3). Awarded a Meritorious Unit Commendation. Deployed to Iraq in 2005 during the third year of Operation Iraqi Freedom (OIF 05-06). Awarded a Meritorious Unit Commendation. Deployed to Iraq in 2007 during the fifth year of Operation Iraqi Freedom (OIF 07-08). Deployed to Afghanistan in 2007 during the eighth year of Operation Enduring Freedom (OEF 07-08). Deployed to Afghanistan in 2010 (in support of Marine Exp Forces), Bahrain and the Horn of Africa under Operation Enduring Freedom. Currently deployed to Afghanistan under OEF XII with 1st Cavalry Division and the 172nd Infantry Brigade. Moved to 12th Psychological Operations Battalion from 14th Psychological Operations Battalion in 2009. Deployed to Djibouti in 2019-2020 in support of Operation Enduring Freedom - Horn of Africa.: 349th Psychological Operations Company (Tactical) (Airborne), in Aurora (CO); Deployed to Afghanistan in 2012: 361st Psychological Operations Company (Tactical) (Airborne), in Bothell (WA); Deployed to Bosnia in 2000, part of the Stabilization Force 7 (SFOR 7) peace-keeping mission in support of 3d ACR. Deployed TPD 1270 (15 personnel) to Iraq in 2003, part of OIF 1 in support of 3d ACR and Al Anbar Province; received Valorous Unit Award. During this deployment TPD1270 team sergeant Mark Hadsell notoriously bragged to reporters about having supposedly used music in interrogations. Deployed TPD 1280 (15 personnel) to Iraq in 2003, part of OIF 1 in support of 2nd ACR and Baghdad, Iraq; received Presidential Unit Citation. Cross-leveled 11 personnel to 320th PSYOP Company to support their 2004 Afghanistan deployment. Deployed TPD 1290 to Iraq in September 2004 in support of 1-25 Infantry Stryker Brigade operations in Mosul, Iraq during OIF 3. One member of the detachment was wounded and evacuated from Iraq during fighting in Tal Afar in early 2005. Received Valorous Unit Award. Deployed to Iraq in 2008 supporting the 25th Infantry Division. The unit or a detachment of the 361st received Meritorious Unit Commendation for the period 11 November 2008 to 15 August 2009. Deployed to Afghanistan part of OEF 12-13. Received Meritorious Unit Commendation for the period 21 September 2012 to 17 June 2013.
14th Psychological Operations Battalion (Tactical) (Airborne)		14th Psychological Operations Battalion (Tactical) (Airborne), in Mountain View (CA); 301st Psychological Operations Company (Tactical) (Airborne), in San Diego (CA); Deployed to Iraq 2003-2004 (1st reserve PSYOP company on the ground in OIF 1): 304th Psychological Operations Company, in Sacramento (CA); Deployed to Afghanistan in 2003 to 2004 Deployed to Iraq in 2005 to 2006 Deployed to Iraq in 2008 to 2009 Deployed to Iraq in 2011: 315th Psychological Operations Company (Tactical) (Airborne), in Upland (CA); Deployed to Kosovo in 2000, part of Task Force Falcon. Supported 1st AD. Deployed to Iraq in 2003, part of OIF 1. Supported 3d ID and 1st AD. Deployed to Afghanistan in 2006. Deployed to Iraq in 2008.: 353rd Psychological Operations Company (Tactical) (Airborne), in Las Vegas (NV); Activated 2010
17th Psychological Operations Battalion (Tactical) (Airborne)		17th Psychological Operations Battalion (Tactical) (Airborne), in Austin (TX); Deployed to Iraq and Afghanistan in 2010 to 2011 TPD 1720 was deployed to Iraq in 2005-2006. Took part in the Battle of Tal Afar Receiving a Meritorious Unit Commendation and Valorous Unit Award for their action. TPD 1640 was deployed to Afghanistan in 2007-2008 in support of Operation Enduring Freedom. One soldier from the detachment during the tour was KIA, SGT. Charles B. Kitowski.: 341st Psychological Operations Company (Tactical) (Airborne), at Camp Bullis (TX); 344th Psychological Operations Company (Tactical) (Airborne), in Austin (TX); Activated as the 244th PSYOP Company in Vietnam War 10FEB1966 from merger of 1st PSYOP Field Support Detachment and 27th PSYWAR Detachment personnel. Transferred to the Army Reserves at Abilene, Texas in 1975 Deployed a detachment to Iraq in support of Operation Desert Storm in 1991 Inactivated at Abilene, Texas in 1994. Redesignated as the 344th PSYOP Co. in 1996 Reactivated as the 344th Tactical PSYOP Company (Airborne) in Austin, Texas on 30NOV2008. Deployed to Afghanistan in support of Operation Enduring Freedom from 2010-2011. Deployed a detachment to Djibouti in support of Operation Enduring Freedom - Horn of Africa in 2019: 345th Psychological Operations Company (Tactical) (Airborne), in Lewisville (TX); 245th PSYOP Co. was constituted into the regular Army on 20 December 1965. The unit deployed to Vietnam in February, 1966. The 245th was assigned to the 6th BN, 7th PSYOP Group. 245th elements supported the 1 CAV DIV, 101st ABN DIV, and was awarded a Meritorious Unit Citation and Vietnam Cross of Gallantry with Palm Device. Inactivated in January 1968. The 245th was reconstituted on 30 October 1975 in the Army Reserve under the 90th ARCOM, 5th U.S. Army. In 1980, the 245th supported the Cuban Refugee Resettlement Project at Ft. McCoy, WI. The 245th was placed under USACAPOC and U.S. Army Special Operations Command in 1990. 27 December 1990, 18 soldiers mobilized to support Operation Desert Shield. Here the unit earned a Navy Meritorious Unit Commendation as well as a Meritorious Unit Commendation. 16 September 1994, a Tactical Detachment deployed to Haiti in support of Operation Uphold Democracy. Two soldiers supported a team of the 3rd Special Forces Group and the rest were with the 10th Mountain. In 1996, the 245th was redesignated the 345th Tactical PSYOP Co. (Airborne), 16th BN, 2nd PSYOP GRP. In 1998, the unit operated in Bosnia. The unit was primarily in the Multi-National Division North supporting the 3/2 Armored Cavalry Regiment. Other soldiers were in Sarajevo and Banja Luka. In 2000, a Tactical Detachment deployed to Kosovo to conduct missions, in support of Operation Joint Guardian. In 2002, three Tactical Detachments and a Headquarters/PDD deployed with the 3rd Special Forces Group's 1st BN to Afghanistan for Operation Enduring Freedom. From February to October 2004, the 345th was assigned responsibility for tactical PSYOP in Baghdad, Iraq supporting elements of the 1st Armored Division, 1st Cavalry Division, and 10th Mountain Division. Deployed to Iraq in support of Operation Desert Storm in 1991 [under previous designation as the 245th PSYOP Company] Deployed to Afghanistan in support of Operation Enduring Freedom in 2002 Deployed to Iraq in support of Operation Iraqi Freedom in 2004.: 399th Psychological Operations Company (Tactical) (Airborne), in San Marcos (TX)
