= 4th Psychological Operations Group =

US Army Special Operations unit

4th Psychological Operations Group (Airborne)
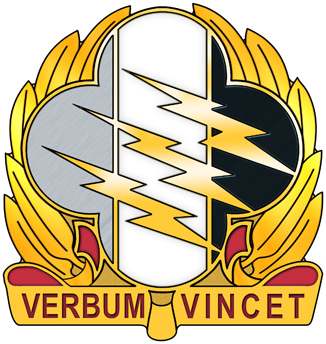
- Distinctive unit insignia
- Active: 7 November 1967 – 2 October 1971; 13 September 1972–present
- Country: United States
- Branch: United States Army
- Role: Psychological operations
- Size: 1,000
- Part of: 1st Special Forces Command (Airborne)
- Garrison/HQ: Fort Bragg, North Carolina
- Mottos: "Verbum Vincet" ("The Word Will Conquer")
- Decorations: Meritorious Unit Commendation

Commanders
- Current commander: Colonel Rustie W. Kim

Insignia
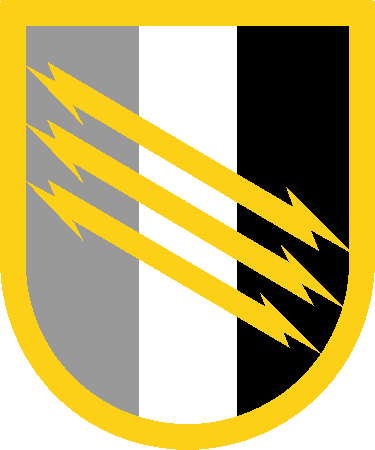
- Group beret flash

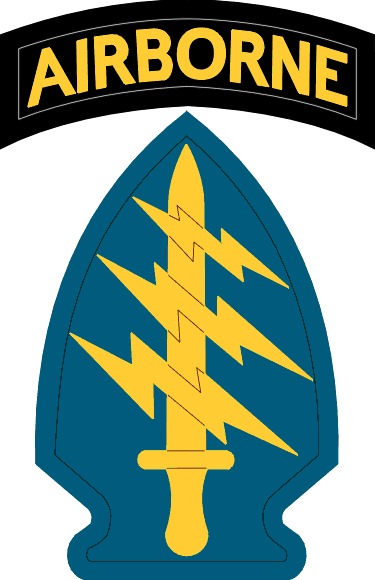
- 1st Special Forces Command (Airborne) shoulder sleeve insignia, worn by all subordinate units

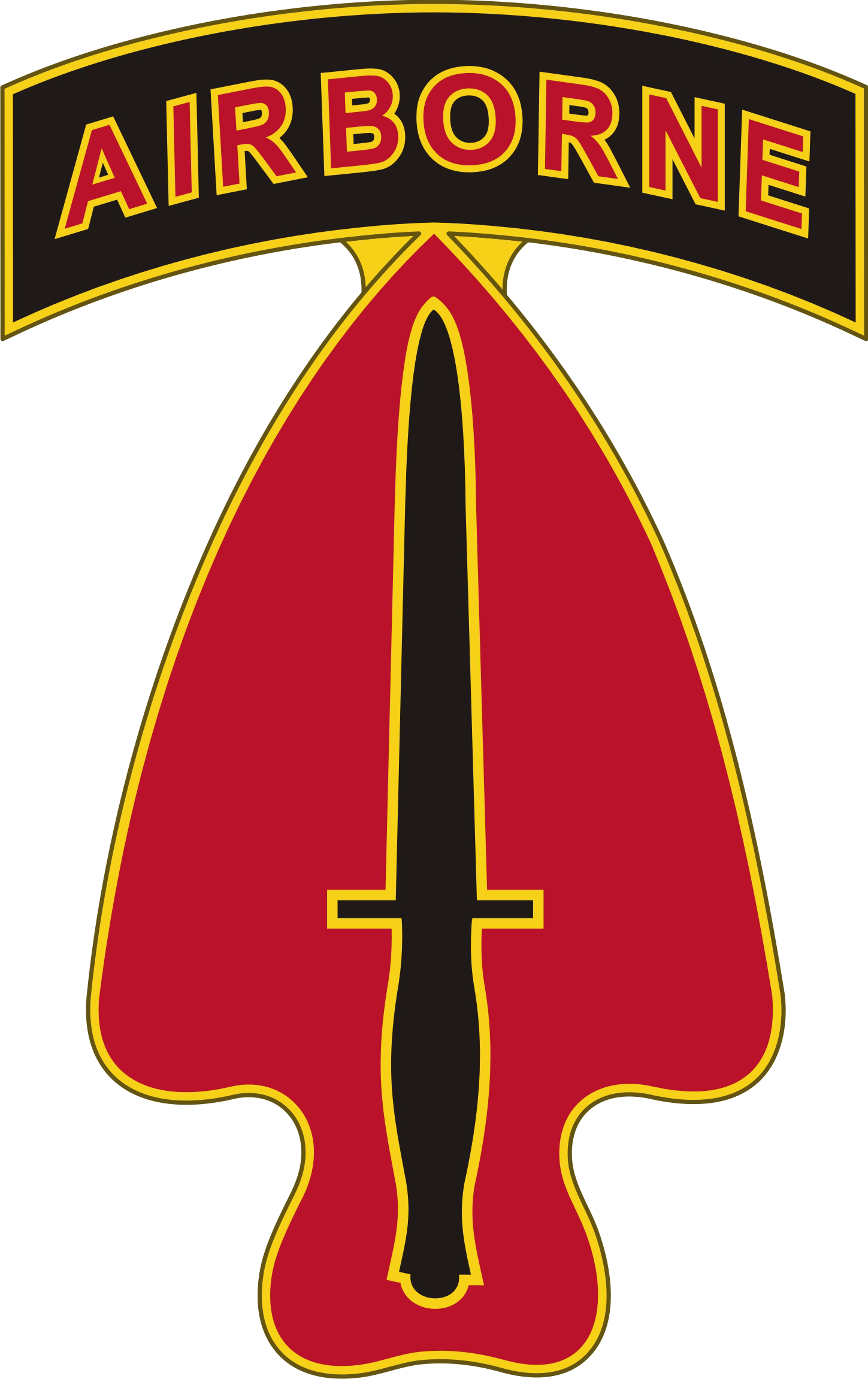
- Former combat service identification badge

The 4th Psychological Operations Group (Airborne) or 4th POG(A) is one of the United States Army's active military information support operations units along with the 8th Psychological Operations Group (Airborne), which was activated 26 August 2011 at Fort Bragg. The 8th Group has responsibility for the 3rd and 9th Psychological Operations battalions while the 4th Group has responsibility for the 1st, 5th, 6th, 7th, and 8th battalions.

On 21 June 2010, an announcement was made that the military intends to rename psychological operations, or PSYOP, to Military Information Support Operations. The decision, made a few days earlier by Admiral Eric Olson, Commander, United States Special Operations Command and Army's Chief of Staff General George Casey, was propagated through a memo dated 23 June 2010. By October 2017, the U.S. Army Special Operations Command (USASOC) reverted its decision changing their name back to PSYOP stating, "Psychological operations refers to the name of units, while MISO refers to the function that soldiers in PSYOP units perform".

The unit is based at Fort Bragg, North Carolina and is a part of the 1st Special Forces Command (Airborne), under the United States Army Special Operations Command. The 4th POG was constituted 7 November 1967 in the Regular Army as Headquarters and Headquarters Company, 4th Psychological Operations Group. Originally activated 1 December 1967 in Saigon, Republic of Vietnam, it was inactivated 2 October 1971 at Fort Lewis, Washington, and reactivated 13 September 1972 at Fort Bragg.

== Operations ==
The 4th POG's mission is to degrade hostile morale to persuade the hostile to not carry out operations, as well as influencing global populations to "fight, to surrender, to BELIEVE.”

== Campaign participation credits ==
=== Vietnam ===
- Counteroffensive, Phase III
- Tet Counteroffensive
- Counteroffensive, Phase IV
- Counteroffensive, Phase V
- Counteroffensive, Phase VI
- Tet 69/Counteroffensive
- Summer-Fall 1969
- Winter-Spring 1970
- Sanctuary Counteroffensive
- Counteroffensive, Phase VII
- Consolidation I

=== Armed forces expeditions ===
- Grenada
- Haiti
- Panama
- Somalia

=== Southwest Asia ===
- Defense of Saudi Arabia;
- Liberation and Defense of Kuwait
- Southwest Asia Cease-Fire

== Organization ==
4th POG(A) currently consists of a headquarters company and seven PSYOP battalions (POB). Many battalions are dedicated to a certain region of the world and supports a geographic combatant command on military information support operations.

1st POB(A) – United States Southern Command (USSOUTHCOM)

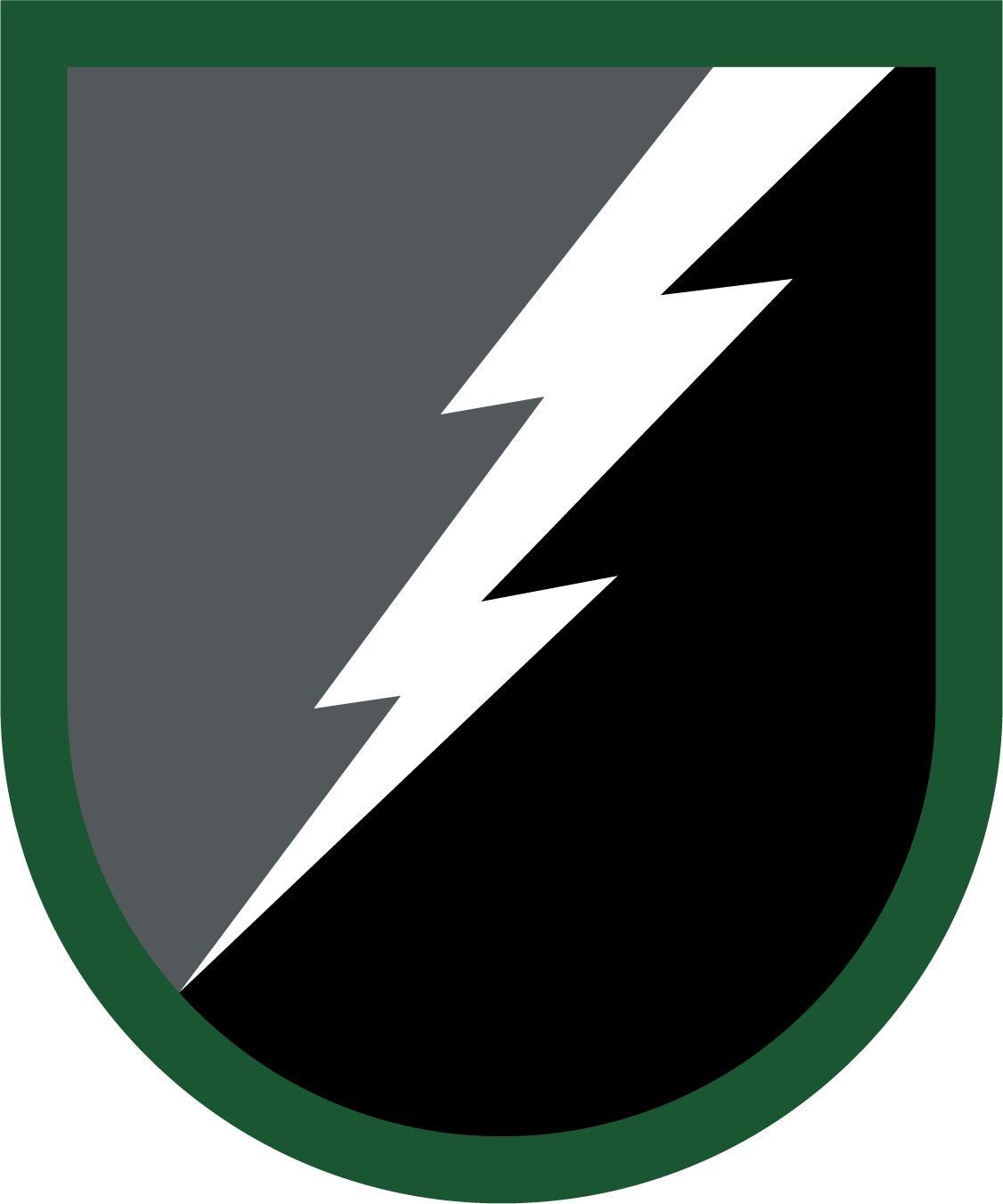
1st POB(A) Beret Flash

- Organized 8 November 1950 in the Regular Army at Fort Riley, Kansas, as Headquarters and Headquarters Company, 1st Radio broadcasting and Leaflet Group.
- Reorganized and redesignated 1 September 1951 as Headquarters and Headquarters Company, 1st Radio broadcasting and Leaflet Group, 8239th Army Unit.
- Consolidated 21 February 1955 with Headquarters and Headquarters Company, 1st Radio Broadcasting and Leaflet Battalion (constituted 30 November 1954 in the Regular Army) and consolidated unit designated as Headquarters and Headquarters Company, 1st Radio Broadcasting and Leaflet Battalion; concurrently reorganized at Fort Bragg, North Carolina.
- Reorganized and redesignated 24 June 1960 as Headquarters and Headquarters Company, 1st Psychological Warfare Battalion. Reorganized and redesignated 20 December 1965 as the 1st Psychological Operations Battalion.
- Reorganized and redesignated 16 March 1990 as Headquarters and Headquarters Company, 1st Psychological Operations Battalion.
- Reorganized and redesignated 16 November 1995 as Headquarters, Headquarters and Support Company, 1st Psychological Operations Battalion.

5th POB(A) – United States Pacific Command (USPACOM)

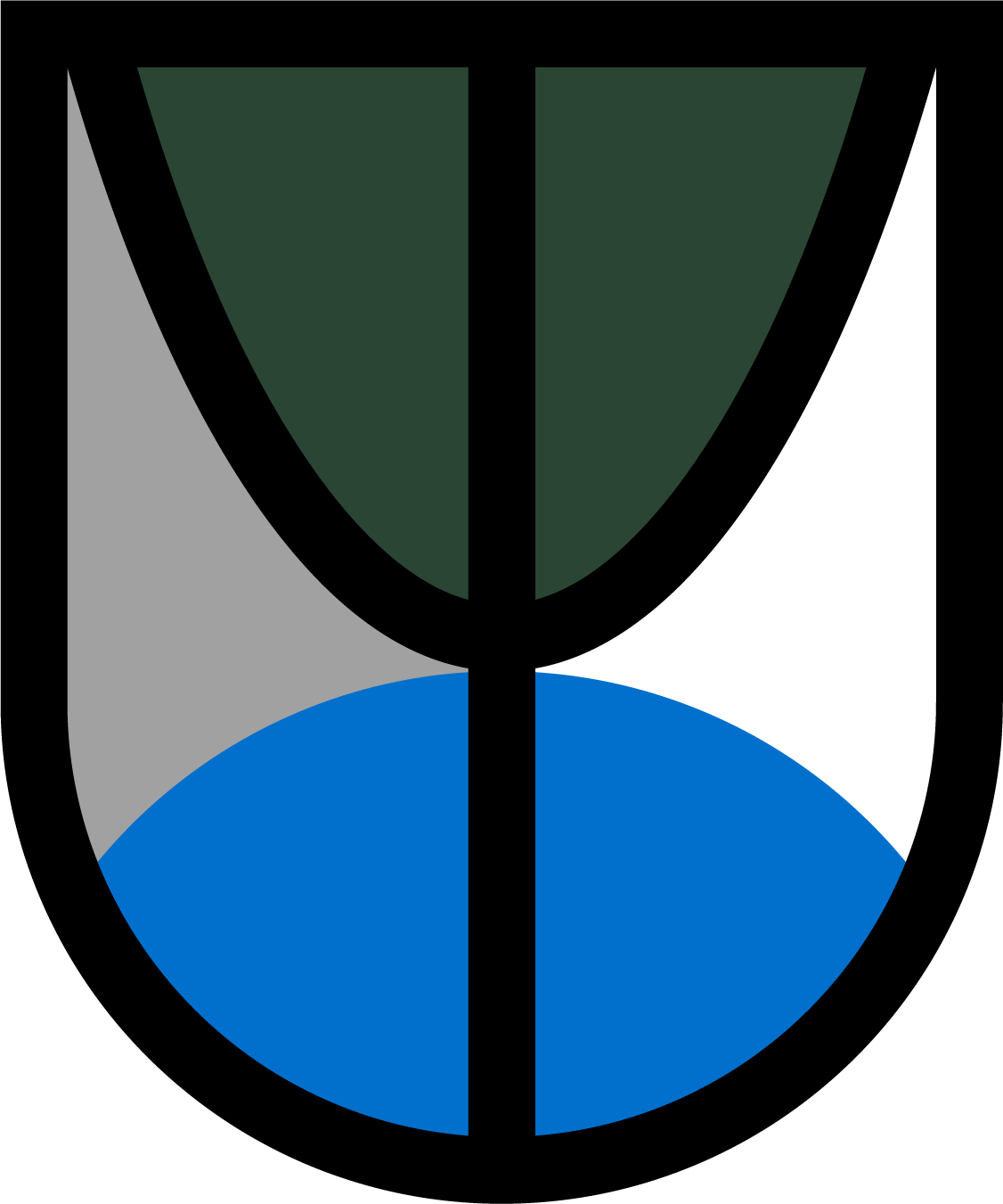
5th POB(A) Beret Flash

- Constituted 3 March 1951 in the Regular Army as the 5th Loudspeaker and Leaflet Company, Army.
- Activated 19 March 1951 at Fort Riley, Kansas
- Reorganized and redesignated 8 June 1953 as the 5th Loudspeaker and Leaflet Company
- Reorganized and redesignated 24 June 1961 as the 5th Psychological Warfare Company

Paratroopers from the 5th Psychological Warfare Company conduct exercise in Lenggries, Germany, 1966 (2:26)

- Reorganized and redesignated 25 June 1965 as the 5th Psychological Operations Battalion
- Inactivated 20 June 1975 in Germany
- Redesignated 30 December 1975 as the 5th Psychological Operations Group; concurrently withdrawn from the Regular Army, allotted to the Army Reserve, and activated at Upper Marlboro, Maryland
- Reorganized and redesignated 18 September 1990 as Headquarters and Headquarters Company, 5th Psychological Operations Group
- Inactivated 15 September 1994 at Upper Marlboro, Maryland
- Redesignated 18 November 2003 as Headquarters, Headquarters and Service Company, 5th Psychological Operations Battalion, withdrawn from the Army Reserve, and allotted to the Regular Army (organic elements concurrently constituted)
- Battalion activated 16 October 2004 at Fort Bragg, North Carolina

6th POB(A) – United States European Command (EUCOM)

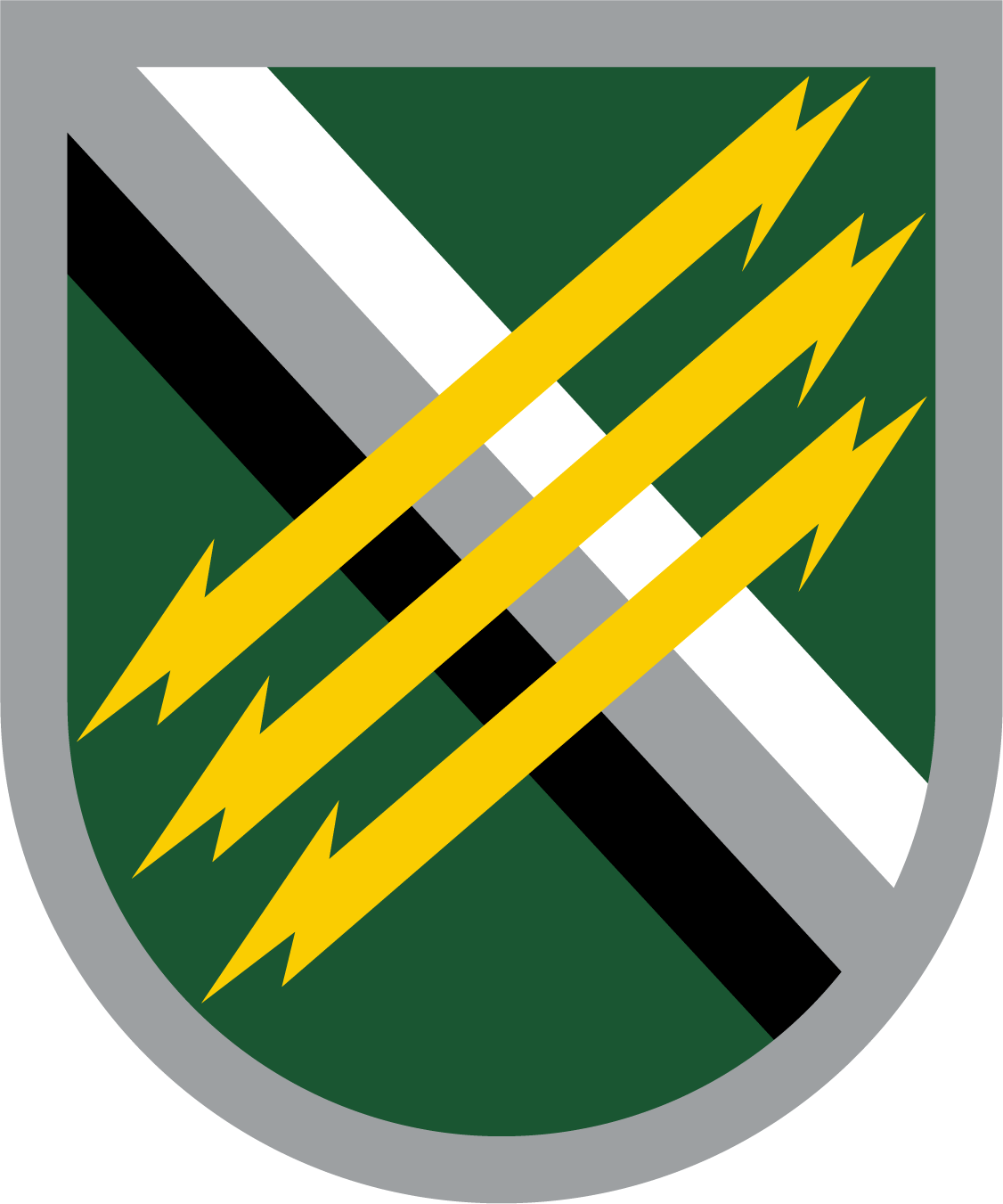
6th POB(A) Beret Flash

- Constituted 20 October 1965 in the Regular Army as the 6th Psychological Operations Battalion
- Activated 1 November 1965 in Vietnam
- Inactivated 30 June 1971 in Vietnam
- Activated 13 September 1972 at Fort Bragg, North Carolina
- Reorganized and redesignated 16 March 1990 as Headquarters and Headquarters Company, 6th Psychological Operations Battalion
- Reorganized and redesignated 16 November 1995 as Headquarters, Headquarters and Service Company, 6th Psychological Operations Battalion (organic elements concurrently constituted and activated with personnel from provisional units)

7th POB(A) – United States Africa Command (AFRICOM)

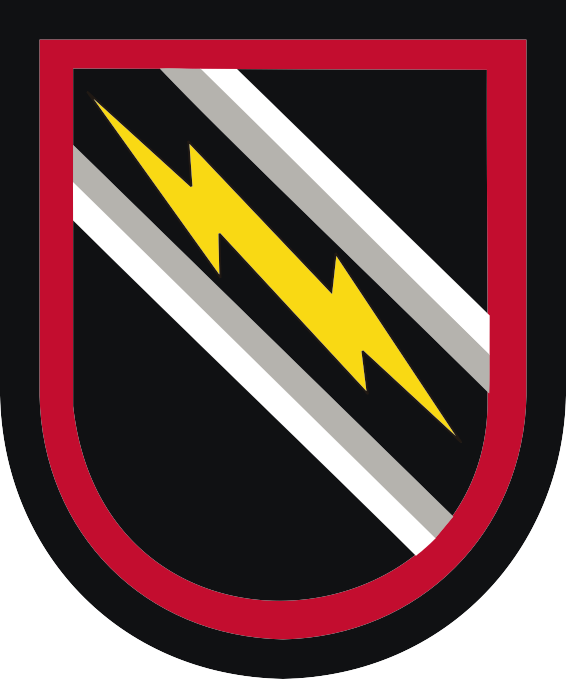
7th POB(A) Beret Flash

- Constituted 23 December 1943 in the Regular Army as the 3rd Mobile Radio Broadcast Company
- Activated 29 December 1943 at Camp Ritchie, Maryland
- Inactivated 27 April 1946 at Verdun, France
- Reorganized and redesignated 16 October 2010 as Headquarters and Headquarters Company, 51st Psychological Operations Battalion
- Redesignated 16 March 2011 as Headquarters, Headquarters and Service Company, 7th Psychological Operations Battalion (organic elements concurrently constituted and activated with personnel from provisional units)
- Activated at Fort Bragg, North Carolina, on 18 October 2011

8th POB(A) – United States Central Command (CENTCOM)

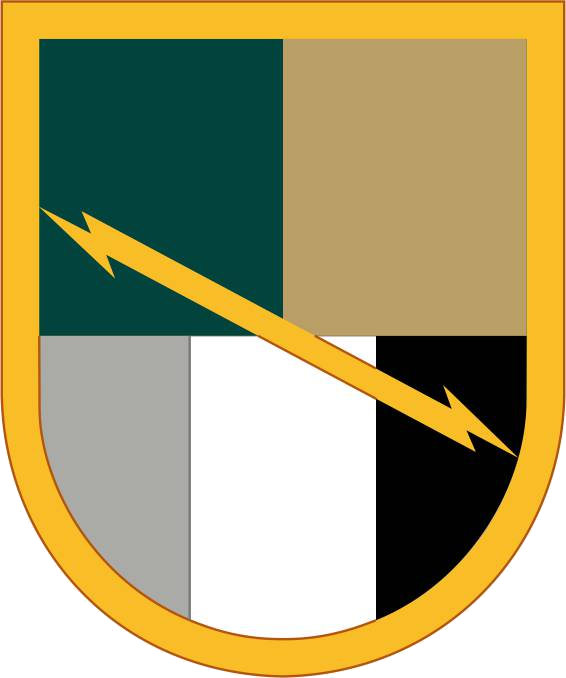
8th POB(A) Beret Flash

- Constituted 7 November 1967 in the Regular Army as the 8th Psychological Operations Battalion
- Activated 1 December 1967 in Vietnam
- Inactivated 27 June 1971 at Fort Lewis, Washington
- Activated 13 September 1972 at Fort Bragg, North Carolina
- Reorganized and redesignated 16 March 1990 as Headquarters and Headquarters Company, 8th Psychological Operations Battalion
- Reorganized and redesignated 16 November 1995 as Headquarters, Headquarters and Service Company, 8th Psychological Operations Battalion (organic elements concurrently constituted and activated with personnel from provisional units)
- In 1997, 8th POB's B Company (with a PACOM area of operations) was split-off from the 8th POB and designated PACOM Battalion (A); PACOM Bn. later formed the nucleus of 5th PSYOP Battalion when it was reactivated in 2003.

9th POB(A) – Tactical Note: Subordination suspected after deactivation of 8th POG(A)

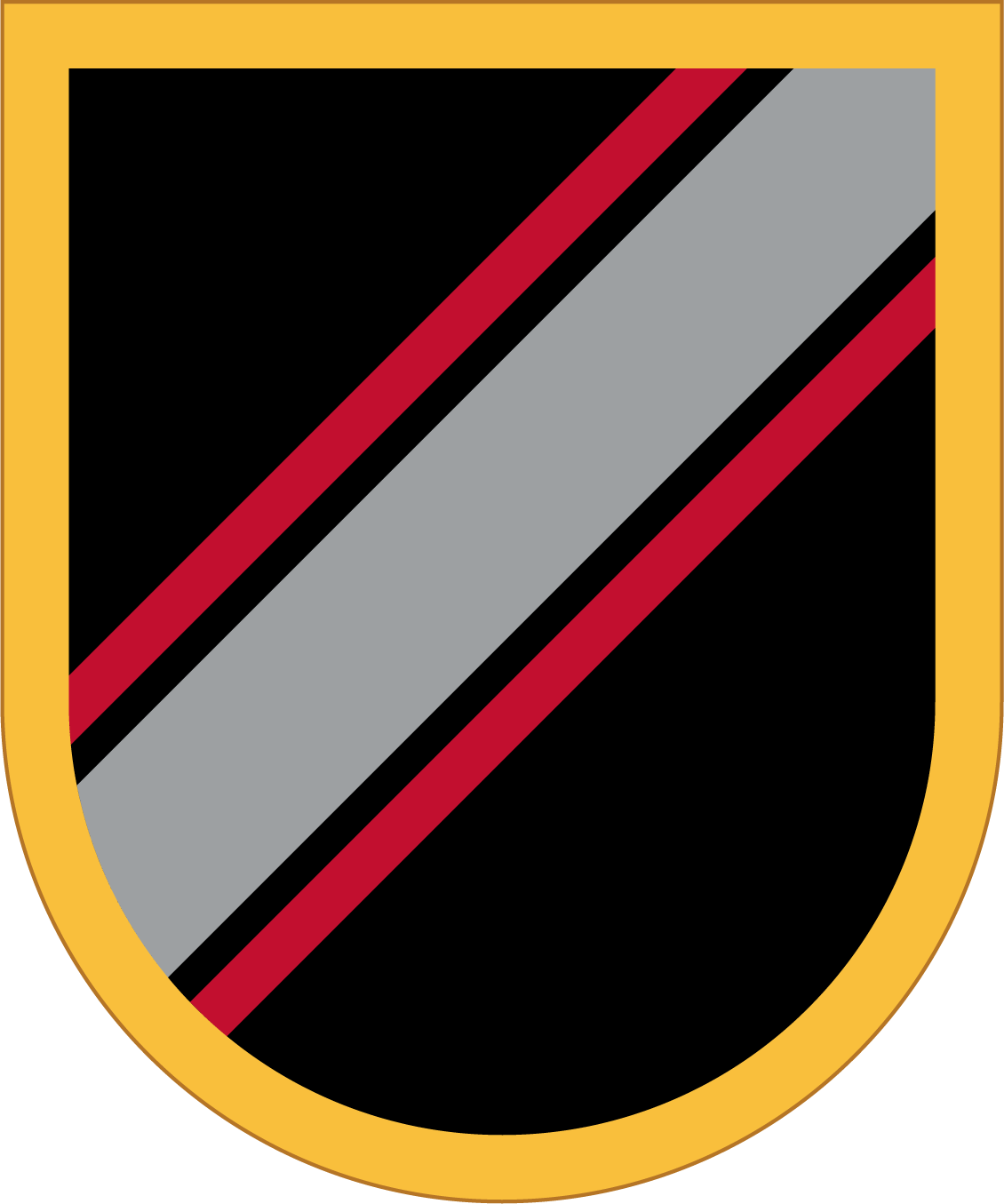
9th POB(A) Beret Flash

This is the Tactical PSYOP element and supports ground commanders in the planning and production of MISO programs.

- Constituted 14 April 1952 in the Regular Army as the 9th Loudspeaker and Leaflet Company, Army.
- Activated 26 April 1952 at Fort Riley, Kansas
- Reorganized and redesignated 27 May 1953 as the 9th Loudspeaker and Leaflet Company
- Inactivated 25 September 1953 at Fort Bragg, North Carolina
- Redesignated 22 March 1963 as the 9th Psychological Warfare Company
- Activated 1 April 1963 in the Panama Canal Zone
- Reorganized and redesignated 1 April 1967 as the 9th Psychological Operations Battalion
- Inactivated 31 December 1974 in the Panama Canal Zone
- Activated 15 April 1985 at Fort Bragg, North Carolina
- Reorganized and redesignated 16 March 1990 as Headquarters and Headquarters Company, 9th Psychological Operations Battalion
- Reorganized and redesignated 16 November 1995 as Headquarters, Headquarters and Service Company, 9th Psychological Operations Battalion (organic elements concurrently constituted and activated with personnel from provisional units)

== See also ==
- Psychological Operations (United States)
- Ghost Army
- Ritchie Boys
- Special Activities Center
