= 8th Psychological Operations Group =

US Army Special Operations unit

8th Psychological Operations Group (Airborne)
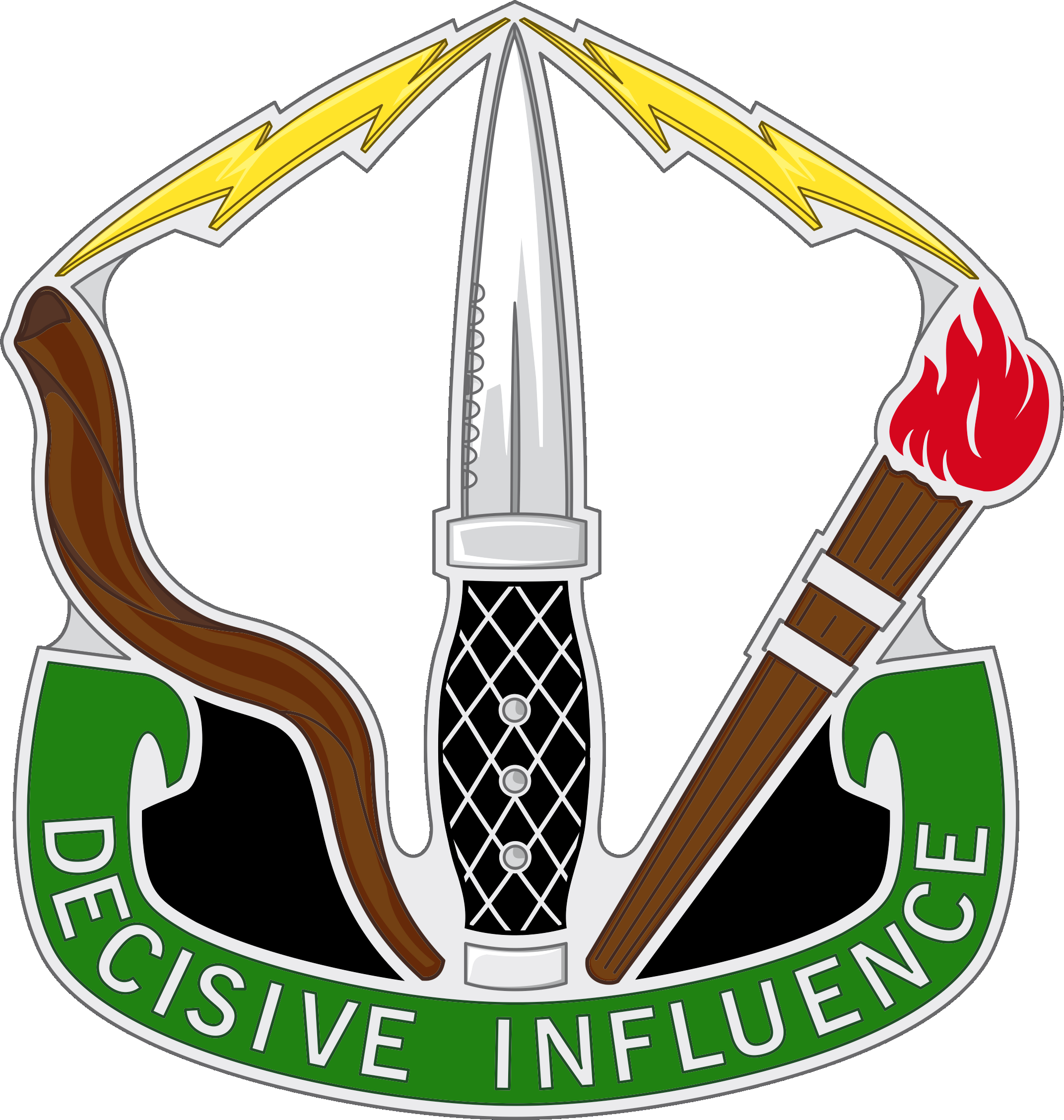
- Distinctive unit insignia
- Active: 2011—2026
- Country: United States of America
- Branch: United States Army
- Role: Psychological operations
- Size: 1,070
- Part of: 1st Special Forces Command (Airborne)
- Garrison/HQ: Fort Bragg, North Carolina

Commanders
- Current commander: Colonel Robert Cusick

Insignia
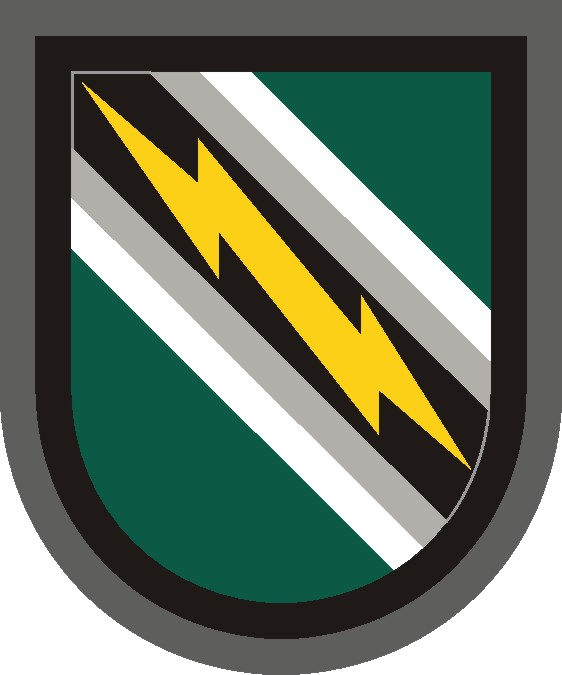
- Unit beret flash

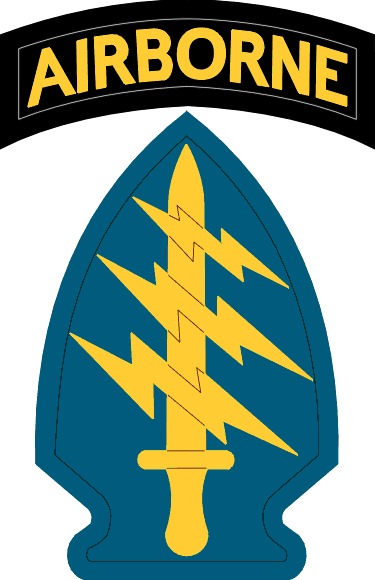
- 1st Special Forces Command (Airborne) shoulder sleeve insignia, worn by all subordinate units

The 8th Psychological Operations Group (Airborne) or 8th POG(A) was one of the United States Army's active Psychological Operations units alongside the 4th Psychological Operations Group (Airborne). The unit was activated 26 August 2011. The activation ceremony was held on Meadows Field at the U.S. Army Special Operations Command headquarters. Lt. Gen. John F. Mulholland, Jr., served as a host. The 8th Group assumed responsibility for the 1st, 5th and 9th Psychological Operations battalions. The unit was based at Fort Bragg, North Carolina and is a part of the 1st Special Forces Command (Airborne).

As of June 2015, both the 4th POG(A) and the new 8th POG(A) were operational. However, the group's former parent unit (originally envisioned as a Brigadier General-level command) known as Military Information Support Operations Command (MISOC) (Airborne) and created at the same time as 8th MISG, in 2011, enjoyed only a very brief operational existence before being dissolved in 2014. The MISOC(A) exists now only as a historical footnote. The 4th POG(A) and 8th POG(A) were subsequently reassigned under the newly established 1st Special Forces Command (Airborne) (SFC(A)), under U.S. Army Special Operations Command (USASOC). 8th POG(A) cased its colors (deactivated) on September 29, 2026.

On 26 August 2021, Staff Sergeant Ryan C. Knauss of Company B, 9th Psychological Operations Battalion, 8th Psychological Operations Group, was killed in the suicide bombing at Abbey Gate, Hamid Karzai International Airport, during the evacuation from Afghanistan. He was the last U.S. Army soldier and special operator killed in the Afghanistan War.

== Organization ==
8th POG(A) consisted of a headquarters company and two psychological operations battalions (or POBs):

3rd POB(A) – Dissemination
The 3rd POB(A) is organized to provide the PSYOP Force and other SOF units with dissemination capabilities. The battalion supports operations around the globe with specialized expeditionary teams to execute print, A/V, and broadcast activities. The unit also houses the Information Warfare Center and other capabilities designed to support SOF.

- Constituted 20 April 1995 in the Regular Army as the 3d POB(A)
- Activated 16 November 1995 at Fort Bragg, North Carolina, with personnel from the Psychological Operations Dissemination Battalion (Provisional) (organized 11 July 1990)
- Deactivated on 3 September 2026 at Fort Bragg, North Carolina

9th POB(A) – Tactical
This is the Tactical PSYOP element and supports ground commanders in the planning and production of MISO programs.

- Constituted 14 April 1952 in the Regular Army as the 9th Loudspeaker and Leaflet Company, Army.
- Activated 26 April 1952 at Fort Riley, Kansas
- Reorganized and redesignated 27 May 1953 as the 9th Loudspeaker and Leaflet Company
- Inactivated 25 September 1953 at Fort Bragg, North Carolina
- Redesignated 22 March 1963 as the 9th Psychological Warfare Company
- Activated 1 April 1963 in the Panama Canal Zone
- Reorganized and redesignated 1 April 1967 as the 9th Psychological Operations Battalion
- Inactivated 31 December 1974 in the Panama Canal Zone
- Activated 15 April 1985 at Fort Bragg, North Carolina
- Reorganized and redesignated 16 March 1990 as Headquarters and Headquarters Company, 9th Psychological Operations Battalion
- Reorganized and redesignated 16 November 1995 as Headquarters, Headquarters and Service Company, 9th Psychological Operations Battalion (organic elements concurrently constituted and activated with personnel from provisional units)

== See also ==
- Psychological Operations (United States)
