= Psychological operations (United States) =

Psychological operations within United States military and intelligence agencies

United States Psychological Operations
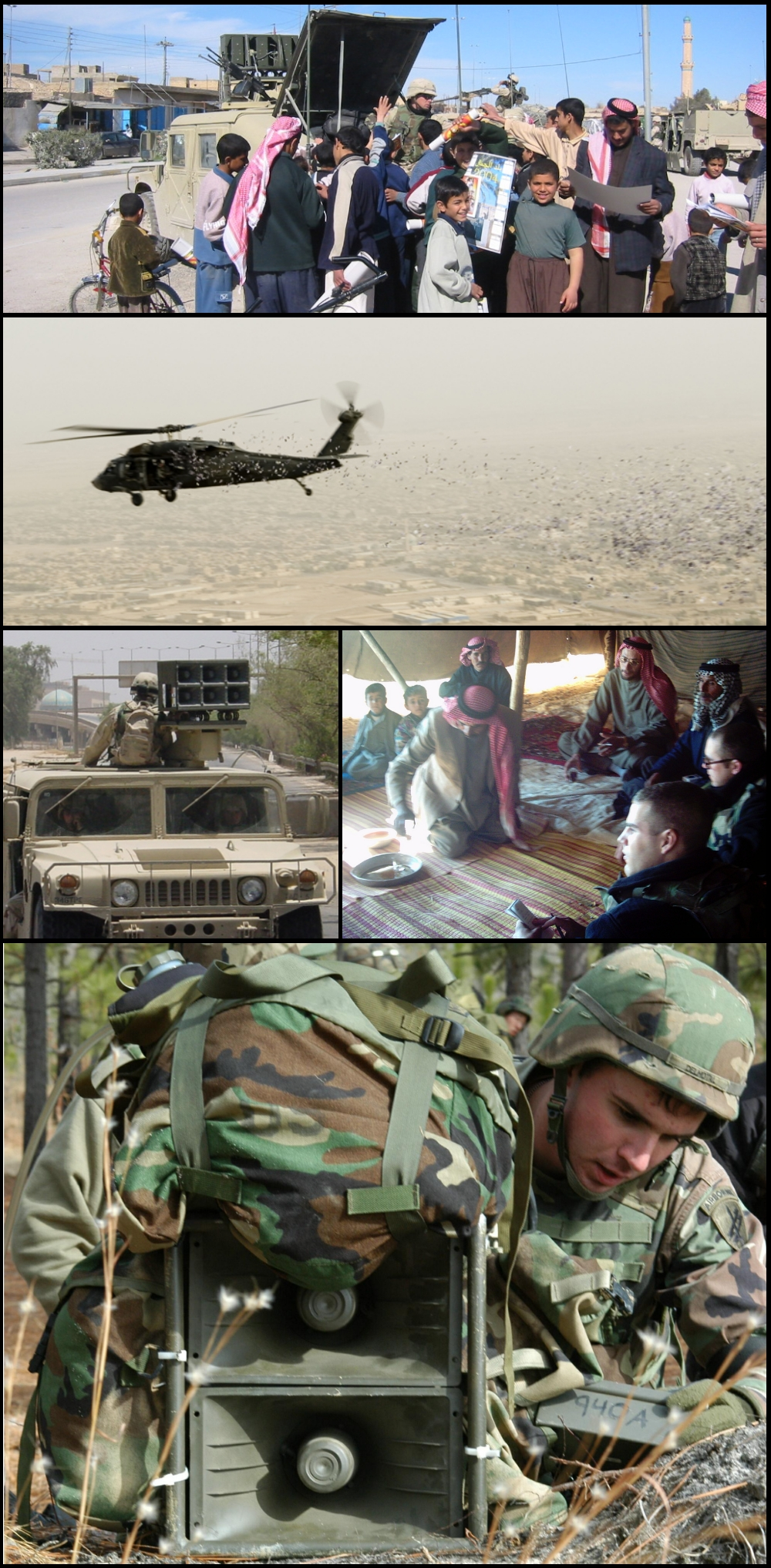
- Country: United States
- Role: Special Operations Forces
- Part of: Special Operations Command: Army: 4th PSYOP Group and 8th PSYOP Group Air Force: 193d Special Operations Wing Marine Corps: Marine Corps Information Operations Center; Army Reserve: United States Army Civil Affairs and Psychological Operations Command Navy Reserve: Naval Reserve Atlantic Fleet PSYOP Audiovisual Unit
- Garrison/HQ: Army: Fort Bragg, NC; Marine: Quantico, VA; Air Force: Middletown, PA; Navy: Norfolk, VA
- Patron: Saint Gabriel (Army)
- Mottos: "Persuade, Change, Influence" (Army) "Never Seen, Always Heard" (Air Force)
- Colors: Army; Bottle-green piped with silver gray.

Insignia
- Identification symbol: Army ♞ Knight (chess)

Psychological operations (PSYOPs) are military operations to convey selected information and indicators to audiences to influence their motives and objective reasoning, and ultimately the behavior of governments, organizations, groups, and large foreign powers.

The purpose of United States psychological operations is to induce or reinforce behavior perceived to be favorable to U.S. objectives. They are an important part of the range of diplomatic, informational, military and economic activities available to the U.S. They can be utilized during both peacetime and conflict. At the strategic level, psychological operations include informational activities conducted by the U.S. government agencies outside of the military arena, though many utilize Department of Defense (DoD) assets. They are conducted across the range of military operations, including during peacetime, in a defined operational area to promote the effectiveness of the joint force commander's (JFC) campaigns and strategies. At the tactical level, they are conducted in the area assigned to a tactical commander across the range of military operations to support the tactical mission against opposing forces.

Psychological operations can encourage popular discontent with the opposition's leadership, and by combining persuasion with a credible threat, degrade an adversary's ability to conduct or sustain military operations. They can also disrupt, confuse, and protract the adversary's decision-making process, undermining command and control. When properly employed, they have the potential to save the lives of friendly or enemy forces by reducing the adversary's will to fight. By lowering the adversary's morale and then its efficiency, psychological operations can also discourage aggressive actions by creating indifference within their ranks, ultimately leading to surrender.

The integrated employment of the core capabilities of electronic warfare, computer network operations, psychological operations, military deception, and operations security, in concert with specified supporting and related capabilities, to influence, disrupt, corrupt or usurp adversarial human and automated decision making while protecting our own.

Between 2010 and 2014, psychological operations were renamed Military Information Support Operations (MISO), briefly returning to their original nomenclature in August 2014, only to return to MISO shortly thereafter in 2015. The term was again renamed back to psychological operations in October 2017.

== Process ==
The U.S. Army is responsible for military psychological warfare doctrine. U.S. psychological operations forces are generally forbidden to attempt to change the opinions of "U.S. persons" (citizens, residents, or legal entities), in any location globally. However, commanders may use psychological operations forces to provide public information to U.S. audiences during times of disaster or crisis. During noncombatant evacuation operation (NEO) for instance, they can provide evacuation information to U.S. and third-country nationals would also adhere to the order.

During Defense Support of Civil Authorities (DSCA) operations, military public affairs activities, military civil authority information support (CAIS) activities, public information actions, and news media access to the DSCA operational area are subject to approval by the federal department or agency assigned primary responsibility for managing and coordinating a specific emergency support function in the National Response Framework. Psychological operations forces are restricted by policy and SECDEF guidance to only broadcasting and disseminating public information. When authorized for employment in this manner, the forces utilize their media development, production, and dissemination capabilities to deliver public or other critical information during domestic emergencies. Their mission is strictly to inform (i.e. not conducting psychological operations).

Psychological operations were a key Battlefield Operating System used extensively to support Unified Task Force (UNITAF) Somalia operations. In order to maximize the psychological impact, the United States established a Joint PSYOPs Task Force under the supervision of the Director of Operations, which integrated into all plans and operations.

== Psychological operations units ==
The majority of U.S. military psychological operations units are in the Army. In the United States Department of Defense, these are the Army's 4th Psychological Operations Group, 8th Psychological Operations Group; the United States Navy also plans and executes limited psychological operations missions.

United States service members are prohibited by law from conducting psychological operations on domestic audiences. However, information intended for foreign audiences, including public diplomacy and psychological operations, are increasingly is consumed by our domestic audience and vice-versa.

=== Army ===
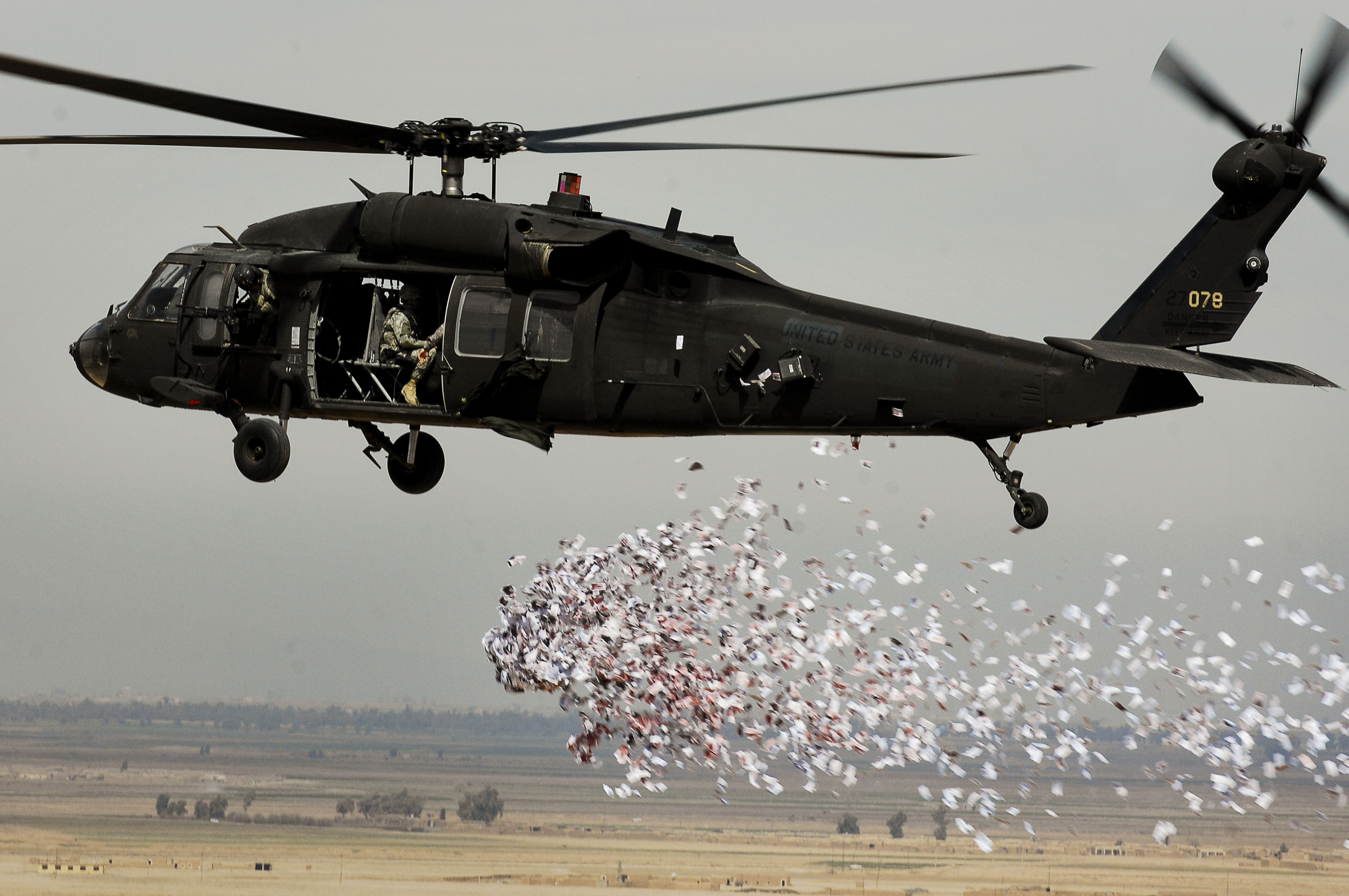
Soldiers from the U.S. Army's 350th Tactical Psychological Operations, 10th Mountain Division, drop leaflets over a village near Hawijah in Kirkuk province, Iraq, on March 6, 2008.

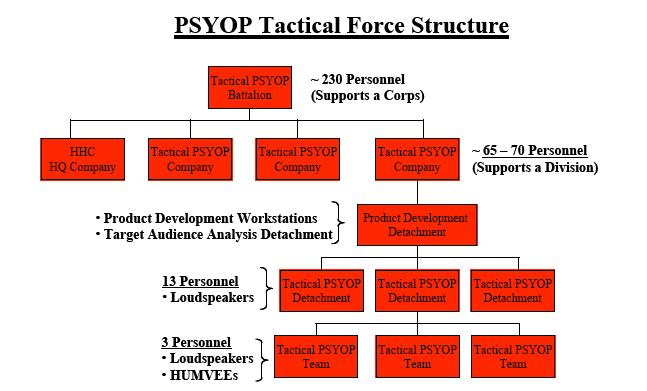
U.S. Army PSYOP Force structure

Until shortly after the start of the war on terror, the Army's Psychological Operations elements were administratively organized alongside Civil Affairs to form the U.S. Army Civil Affairs and Psychological Operations Command (USACAPOC), forming a part of the U.S. Army Special Operations Command (USASOC). In May 2006 the USCAPOC was reorganized to instead fall under the Army reserve command, and all active duty elements were placed directly into USASOC. While reserve psychological operations forces no longer belong to USASOC, that command retains control of psychological operation doctrine.

==== Army units ====
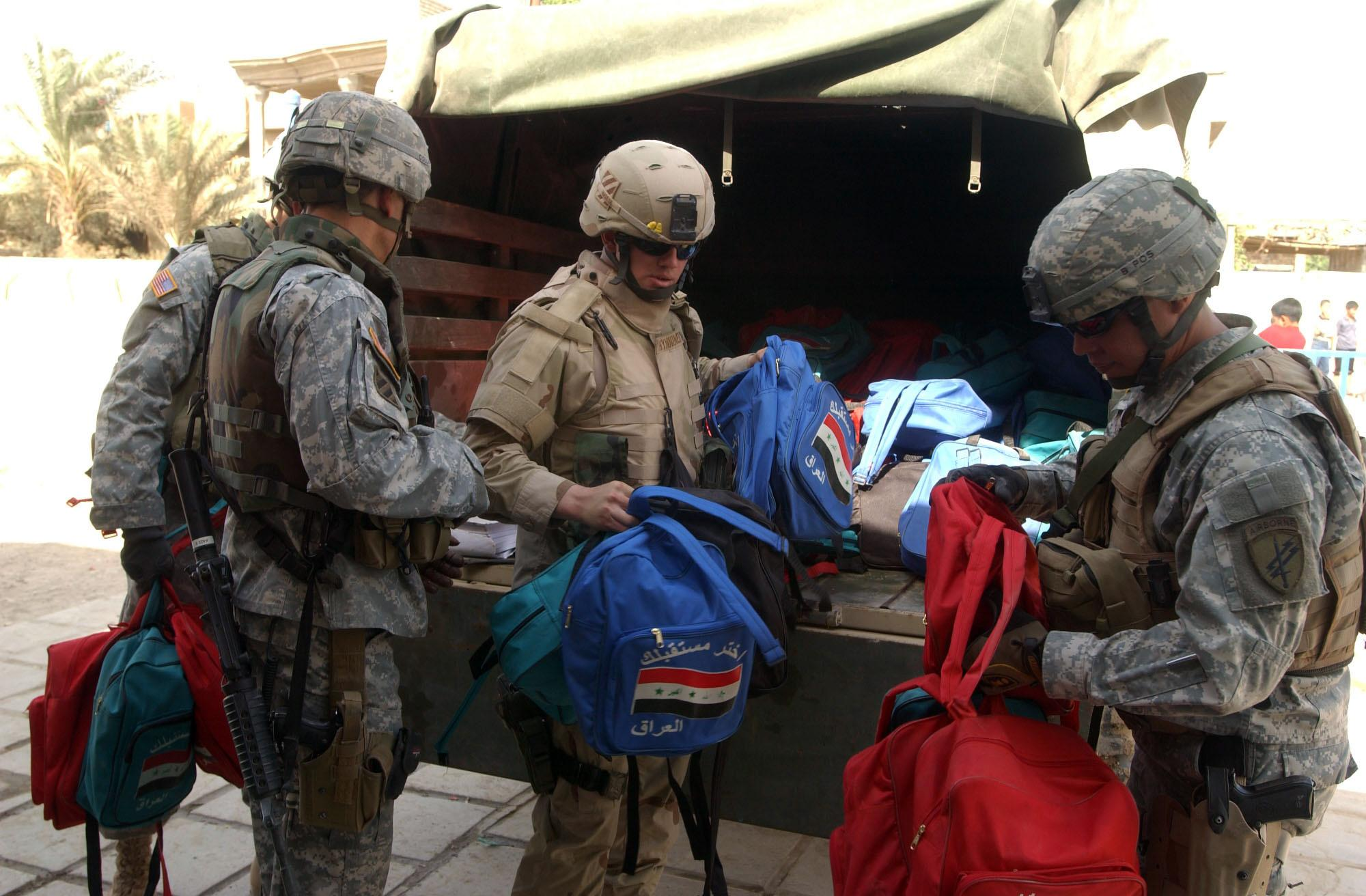
345th PSYOP Company (pictured left to right: SPC Jeffrey A. Cogbill, SPC William O'Connell, CPL Ryan Lewis), United States Army Reserve, hand out school supplies in Baghdad, Iraq, 2005.

There are four psychological operations units in the U.S. Army:

- 2nd Psychological Operations Group
- 4th Psychological Operations Group (Airborne)
- 7th Psychological Operations Group
- 8th Psychological Operations Group (Airborne)

The 4th Psychological Operations Group (Airborne), based at Fort Bragg, was historically the only active duty psychological operations unit remaining in the United States Army following the close of the Vietnam War, until the August 26th, 2011 activation of 8th Psychological Operations Group (Airborne). The 2nd and the 7th Psychological Operations Groups are in the Army Reserve.

=== Navy ===
Navy psychological operations policy is specified in OPNAVINST 3434.1, "Psychological Operations". Leaflets are dropped utilizing the PDU-5B dispenser unit (aka Leaflet Bomb). The Navy coordinates extensively with the Army as the majority of psychological operations assets reside within USASOC. Psychological operations planning and execution is coordinated through the Naval Network Warfare Command (NETWARCOM) and the Naval Information Operations Command (NIOC), both located in Norfolk, VA.

=== Air Force ===
The Air National Guard provides support for psychological operations using the EC-130 Commando Solo, operated by the 193d Special Operations Wing. As a general purpose electronic warfare platform, Commando Solo aircraft can also jam enemy psychological warfare and propaganda broadcasts.

=== Marines ===
In 2018, the Marine Corps created a new Military Occupational Specialty (MOS) with designator 0521 for psychological operations Marines. Candidates will have to complete the Army’s Psychological Qualification Operations Course. The qualification course includes classes in psychology, sociology, cultural training blocks, language training, and human dynamics training, among other training components. They conduct Military Information Support Operations (MISO), which are missions that convey selected information and indicators to foreign organizations, groups, and individuals to influence their emotions, motives, objective reasoning, and ultimately their behavior in a manner favorable to the Commander’s objectives.

== History ==
=== World War I ===
During World War I, the Propaganda Sub-Section was established under the American Expeditionary Force (AEF) Military Intelligence Branch within the Executive Division of the General Staff in early 1918.

=== World War II ===
There was extensive use of psychological operations in World War II, including from the Office of War Information, the Morale Operations branch of the Office of Strategic Services (OSS), with planning starting even before the U.S. entry into the war with the creation of the Office of the Coordinator of Inter-American Affairs (OCIAA), under Nelson Rockefeller, with the responsibility for psychological operations targeted at Latin America. Special operations and intelligence concerning Latin America was a bureaucratic problem throughout the war. Where the OSS eventually had most such responsibilities, the FBI had its own intelligence system in Latin America.

On 11 July 1941, William Donovan was named the Coordinator of Information, which subsequently became the OSS. At first, there was a unit called the Foreign Information Service inside COI, headed by Robert Sherwood, which produced propaganda outside Latin America.

The OSS Morale Operations (MO) branch was the psychological operations arm of the OSS. In general, its units worked on a theater-by-theater basis, without a great deal of central coordination. It was present in most theaters, with the exception of the Southwest Pacific theater under Douglas MacArthur, who was hostile to the OSS. Dwight Eisenhower was notably supportive of psychological operations, had psychological warfare organization in the staff of all his commands, and worked with OSS and OWI.

Engineers of the 1st Radio Section of the 1st MRBC recorded POW interviews for front- line broadcasts, and reproduced the sound effects of vast numbers of tanks and other motor vehicles for Allied armored units in attempts to mislead German intelligence and lower enemy morale. Leaflets were also delivered, principally from aircraft but also with artillery shells.

=== Cold War ===
==== Radio ====
The U.S. engaged in major worldwide radio broadcasts to contain communism, through Radio Free Europe and Radio Liberty.

==== Korea ====
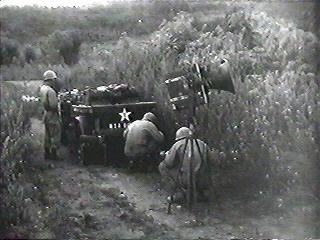
U.S. Army loudspeaker team in action in Korea

Psychological operations were used extensively during the Korean War. The 1st Loudspeaker and Leaflet Company was sent to Korea in fall 1950. Especially for the operations directed against troops of the Democratic People's Republic of Korea (DPRK; North Korea), it was essential to work with Republic of Korea (ROK; South Korea personnel) to develop propaganda with the most effective linguistic and cultural context. Since the war was a United Nations mandated operation, political sensitivities were high. While rules limited mentioning the People's Republic of China or the Soviet Union, first due to fear it would increase their intervention, and later because it might demoralize ROK civilians, Stalin was depicted and Chinese troops were targeted in leafleting.

Various methods were used to deliver propaganda, with constraints imposed by exceptionally rugged terrain and that radios were relatively uncommon among DPRK and PRC troops. Loudspeaker teams often had to get dangerously close to enemy positions. Artillery and light aircraft delivered leaflets on the front lines, while heavy bombers dropped leaflets in the rear. Over 2.5 billion leaflets were dropped over North Korea during the war. Some leafleting of North Korea was resumed after the Korean War, such as in the Cold War Operation Jilli from 1964 to 1968.

==== Vietnam ====
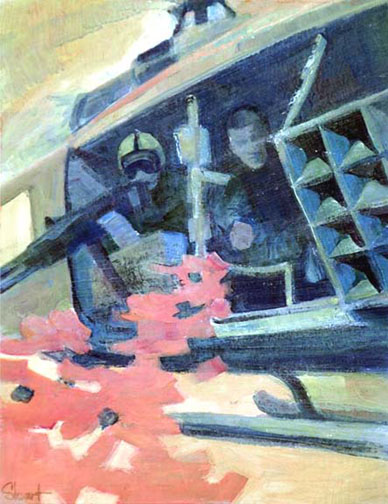
Chieu Hoi Mission by Craig L. Stewart, U. S. Army Vietnam Combat Artists Team IX (CAT IX 1969–70). Painting shows army soldiers airdropping Psy Op leaflets during the Vietnam War.

As early as August 1964, almost one year before the activation of the Joint U.S. Public Affairs Office (JUSPAO), General William Westmoreland told a CA and PSYOP conference that “psychological warfare and civic action are the very essence of the counterinsurgency campaign here in Vietnam…you cannot win this war by military means alone.” Westmoreland’s successor, Creighton Abrams, is known to have sent down guidelines to the 4th Psychological Operations Group that resulted in the drawing up of no fewer than 17 leaflets along those lines. In fact, the interest in PSYOP went all the way up to the Presidency; weekly reports from JUSPAO were sent to the White House, as well as to the Pentagon and the Ambassador in Saigon. In sum, it is a myth that the United States, stubbornly fixated on a World War II-style conventional war, was unaware of the "other war."

=== Wars after 1989 ===
==== Panama ====
The broader scope of information operations in Panama included denying the Noriega regime use of their own broadcasting facilities. A direct action mission removed key parts of the transmitters.

An unusual technique, developed in real time, was termed the "Ma Bell Mission", or, more formally, capitulation missions. There were a number of Panamian strongpoints that continued to have telephone access. By attaching Spanish-speaking Special Forces personnel to a combat unit that would otherwise take the strongpoint by force, the Spanish-speaking personnel would phone the Panamian commander, tell him to put away his weapons and assemble his men on the parade ground, or face lethal consequences. Because of the heavy reliance on telephones, these missions were nicknamed "Ma Bell" operations.

In Ft. Amador, the U.S. and Panamanian Defence Forces (PDF) shared an installation. There were U.S. dependents at the installation, but security considerations prevented evacuating them before the attack. Concern for U.S. citizens, and rules of engagement (ROE) that directed casualties be minimized, PSYOP loudspeaker teams, from the 1st Battalion, 4th PSYOP Group, became a key asset. When the PDF did not surrender after initial appeals, the message changed, with the tactical commander warning "that resistance was hopeless in the face of overwhelming firepower and a series of demonstrations took place, escalating from small arms to 105 mm howitzer rounds. Subsequent broadcasts convinced the PDF to give up. The entire process allowed Ft. Amador to be secured with few casualties and minimal damage."

==== Gulf War ====
Psychological operations were particularly valuable during the Gulf War due to the reluctance of many in the Iraqi military to engage in combat. Through leaflets and loudspeaker broadcasts, PSYOP forces walked many enemy soldiers through successful surrender. Coalition forces worked extensively with Saudi, Kuwaiti, and other partners, to be sure psychological operations were culturally and linguistically appropriate.

==== Iraq War ====
Arguably the most visible image of the 2003 invasion of Iraq was the toppling of a statue of Saddam Hussein in Firdos Square in central Baghdad. This widely reported event led to allegations of American manipulation and staging for mass consumption and pro-US propaganda value. Further claims have been made that the toppling of Saddam's statue was not the natural and spontaneous celebration of the local population in Baghdad, but was with the encouragement of a PSYOP team.

=== Internet influence operation ===
In 2022, Meta and the Stanford Internet Observatory found that for five years, people associated with the U.S. military, who tried to conceal their identities, created fake accounts on social media systems including Balatarin, Facebook, Instagram, Odnoklassniki, Telegram, Twitter, VKontakte and YouTube in an influence operation in Central Asia and the Middle East. Their posts, including nearly 300,000 tweets, were primarily in Arabic, Persian and Russian. They criticized Iran, China and Russia and gave pro-Western narratives. Data suggested the activity was a series of covert campaigns rather than a single operation.

== Recent controversies ==
=== CNN and NPR interns incident ===
In 2000, it came to light that soldiers from the 4th Psychological Operations Group had been interning at the American news networks Cable News Network (CNN) and National Public Radio (NPR) during the late 1990s. The program was an attempt to provide soldiers with the expertise developed by the private sector under its "Training with Industry" program. The program caused concern about the influence these soldiers might have on American news and the internships were terminated.

=== Use of music in the interrogation of prisoners ===
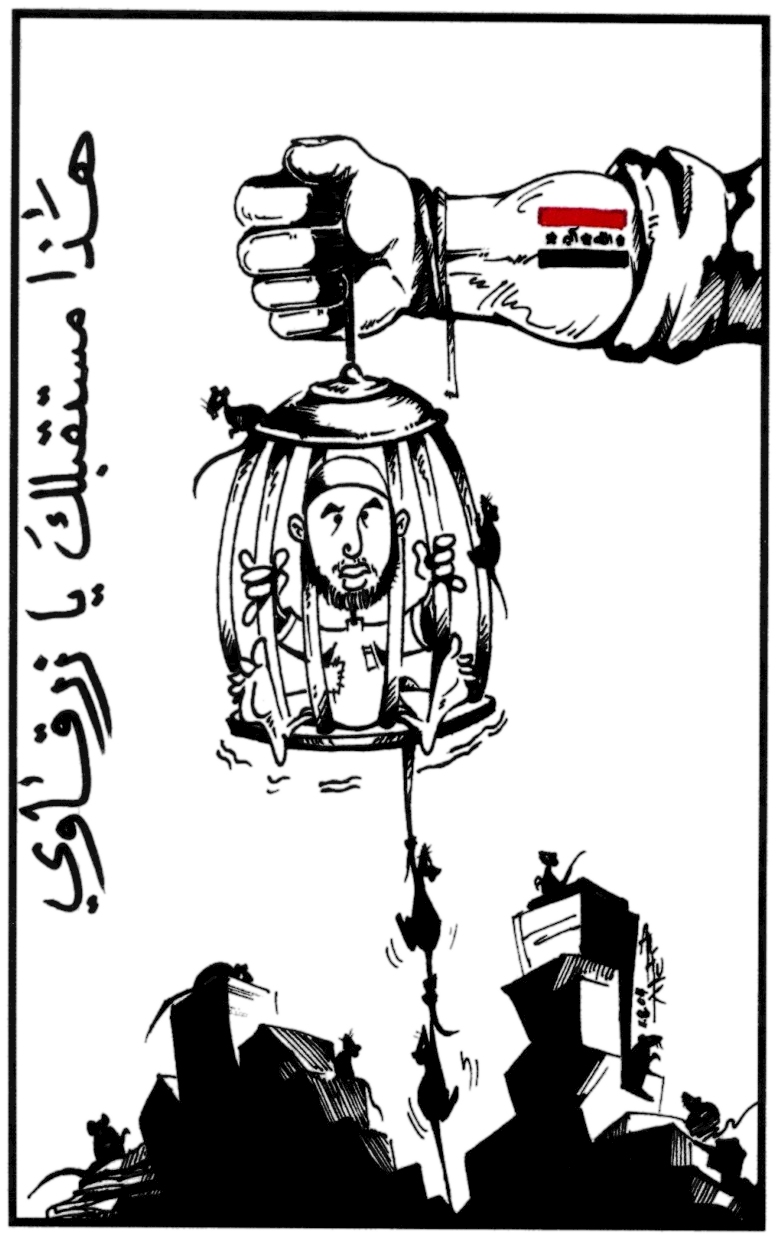
Propaganda pamphlet disseminated in Iraq. The text translates as "This is your future al-Zarqawi," and depicts al-Qaeda terrorist al-Zarqawi caught in a rat trap which is being held by an Iraqi Army soldier or an Iraqi Policeman.

In 2003 Sergeant Mark Hadsell claimed to have used loud music during the interrogation of Iraqi prisoners, stating: "These people haven't heard heavy metal. They can't take it. If you play it for 24 hours, your brain and body functions start to slide, your train of thought slows down and your will is broken. That's when we come in and talk to them."

On 9 December 2008 the Associated Press reported that some musicians were coordinating their objections to the use of their music as a technique for softening up captives through an initiative called Zero dB. In contrast, other musicians did not take issue with the possibility that their music was being used during interrogations. Stevie Benton of the group Drowning Pool commented supportively: "I take it as an honor to think that perhaps our song could be used to quell another 9/11 attack or something like that."

=== Afghanistan ===
During the war on terror, U.S. psyops teams often broadcast abrasive messages over loudspeakers to try to tempt enemy fighters into direct confrontation, where the Americans have the upper hand. Other times, they use their loudspeaker to convince enemy soldiers to surrender. In one incident, a psychological operations sergeant allegedly broadcast the following message to the Taliban:

Attention, Taliban, you are all cowardly dogs. You allowed your fighters to be laid down facing west and burned. You are too scared to retrieve their bodies. This just proves you are the lady boys we always believed you to be.

Another soldier stated:

You attack and run away like women. You call yourself Talibs but you are a disgrace to the Muslim religion and you bring shame upon your family. Come and fight like men instead of the cowardly dogs you are.

U.S. authorities investigated the incident and the two Reserve soldiers received administrative punishment for broadcasting messages which were not approved. They concluded that the broadcast violated standing policies for the content of loudspeaker messages and urged that all soldiers in the command undergo training on Afghan sensitivities.

=== 2009 congressional delegation to Afghanistan ===
In February 2011, journalist Michael Hastings reported in Rolling Stone that Lt. Colonel Michael Holmes, the supposed leader of a psychological operations group in Afghanistan, alleged that Lt. Gen. William B. Caldwell a three-star General in charge of training troops in Afghanistan, ordered Holmes and his group to perform in-depth research on visiting U.S. congressmen in order to spin presentations and visits. According to Holmes, his team was tasked with "illegally providing themes and messages to influence the people and leadership of the United States."

Reported targets included United States Senators John McCain, Joe Lieberman, Jack Reed, Al Franken, Carl Levin, Rep. Steve Israel of the House Appropriations Committee; Adm. Mike Mullen of the Joint Chiefs of Staff; the Czech ambassador to Afghanistan; the German interior minister, and think-tank analysts. Under the 1948 Smith–Mundt Act, such operations may not be used to target Americans. When Holmes attempted to seek counsel and to protest, he was placed under investigation by the military at the behest of General Caldwell's chief of staff.

Caldwell's spokesman, Lt. Col. Shawn Stroud, denied Holmes's assertions, and other unnamed military officials disputed Holmes's claims as false and misleading, saying there are no records of him ever completing any psychological operations training. Subsequently, Holmes conceded that he was not a Psychological Operations officer nor was he in charge of a Psychological Operations unit and acknowledged that Caldwell's orders were "fairly innocuous." Officials say that Holmes spent his time in theater starting a strategic communications business with Maj. Laural Levine, with whom he conducted an improper relationship in Afghanistan. A former aid said, "At no point did Holmes ever provide a product to Gen. Caldwell". General David Petraeus ordered an investigation into the alleged incident.

=== Anti-vaccine propaganda targeted at the Philippines ===
In 2024, Reuters revealed that the first Donald Trump administration launched a covert disinformation campaign against Chinese COVID-19 vaccines in several Asian countries, mainly the Philippines, in 2020. The campaign consisted of hundreds of fake social network profiles staffed by personnel in Florida that sowed doubts about the Chinese vaccine's efficacy and argued Muslims should reject it because it allegedly contained pork protein. In 2021, a few months after Trump's defeat in the presidential election, the Biden administration cancelled the campaign.

== See also ==
- Chieu Hoi
- Congress for Cultural Freedom
- Disinformation
- Fake news
- Information warfare
- Operation Mockingbird
- Pentagon military analyst program
- Propaganda
- Psychological warfare
- Psychological Warfare Division
