= 353d Civil Affairs Command =

353rd Civil Affairs Command (CACOM)
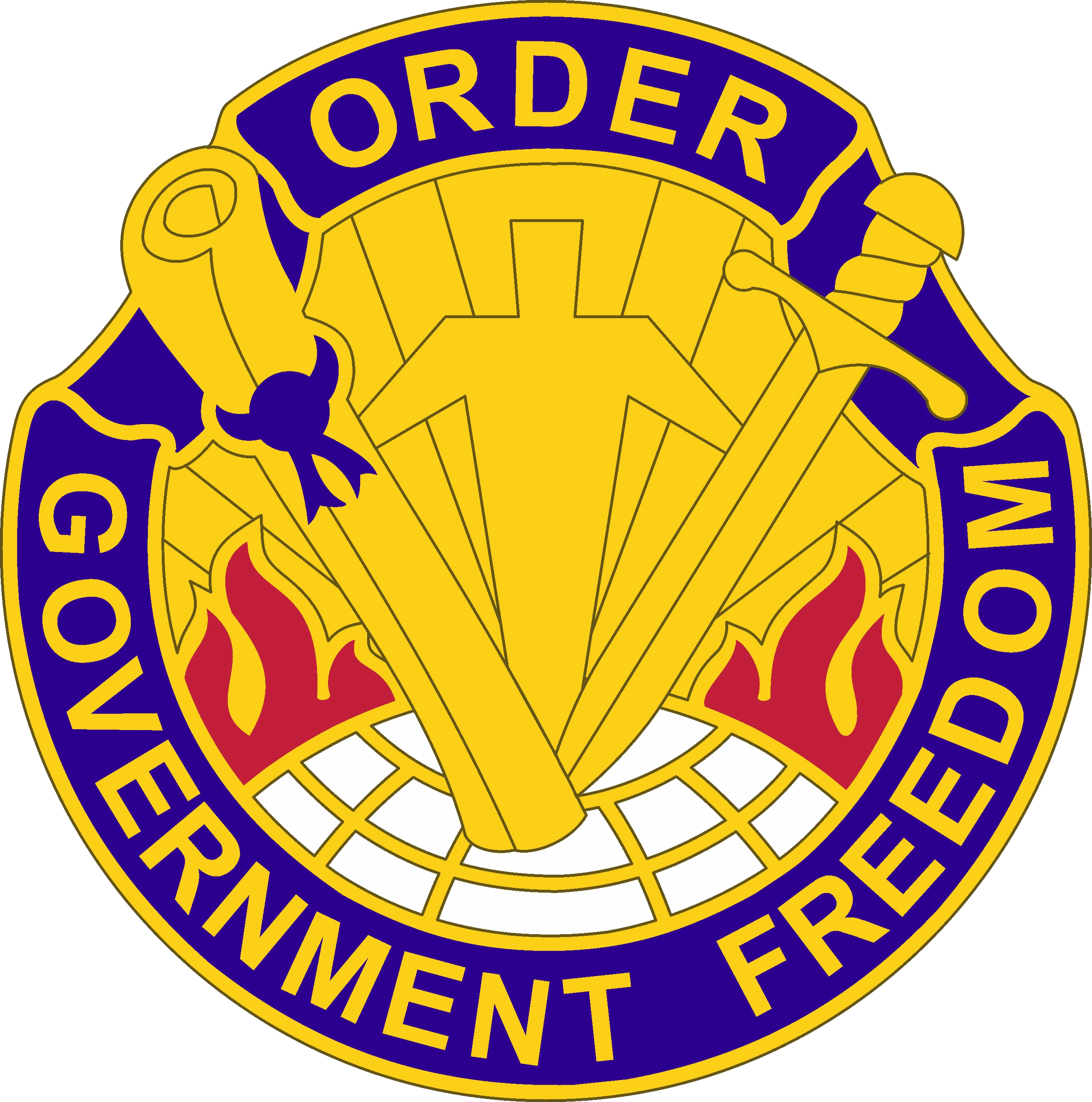
- 353rd CACOM Distinctive Unit Insignia
- Active: 14 July 1952—present
- Country: United States
- Branch: United States Army
- Type: U.S. Army Reserve
- Role: Civil Affairs
- Size: Command
- Part of: U.S. Army Civil Affairs and Psychological Operations Command (USACAPOC)
- Garrison/HQ: Fort Wadsworth, New York
- Mottos: “Order, Government, Freedom”
- Website: 353rd Civil Affairs Command official Facebook page

Commanders
- Current commander: Colonel Clifton Kyle (2024)

Insignia
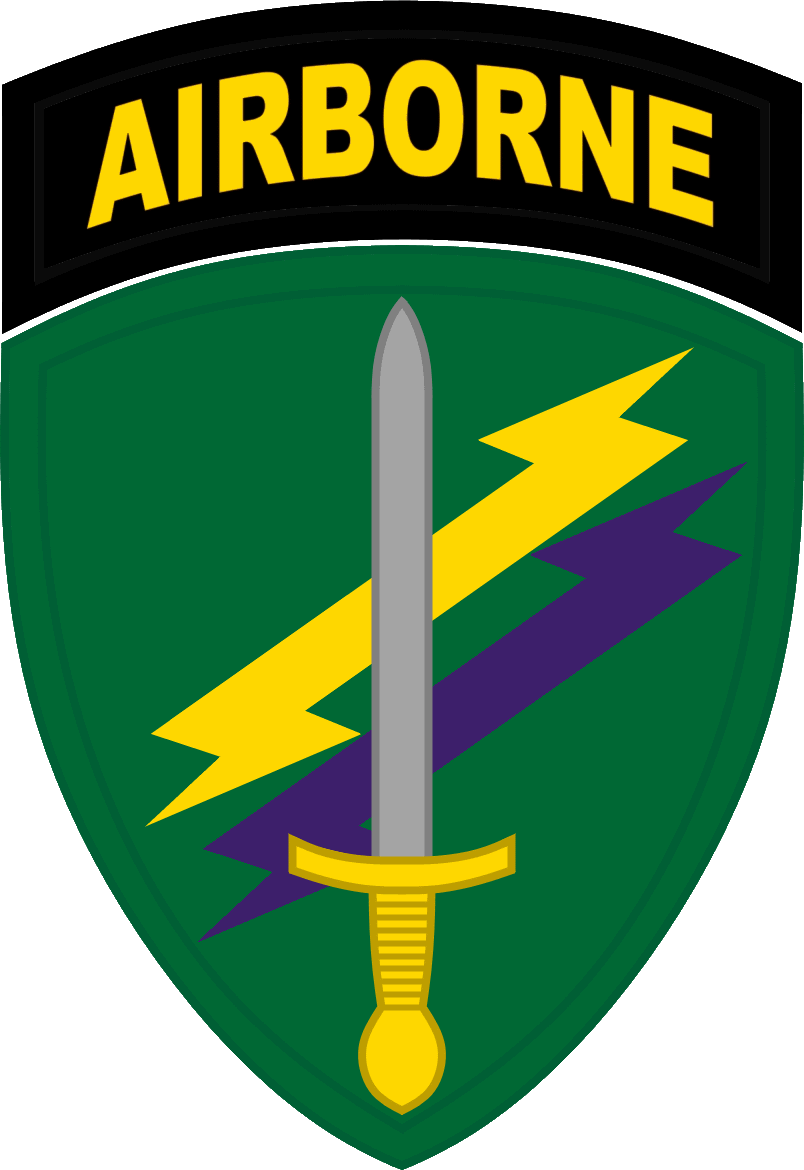
- USACAPOC Shoulder Sleeve Insignia worn by all subordinate units

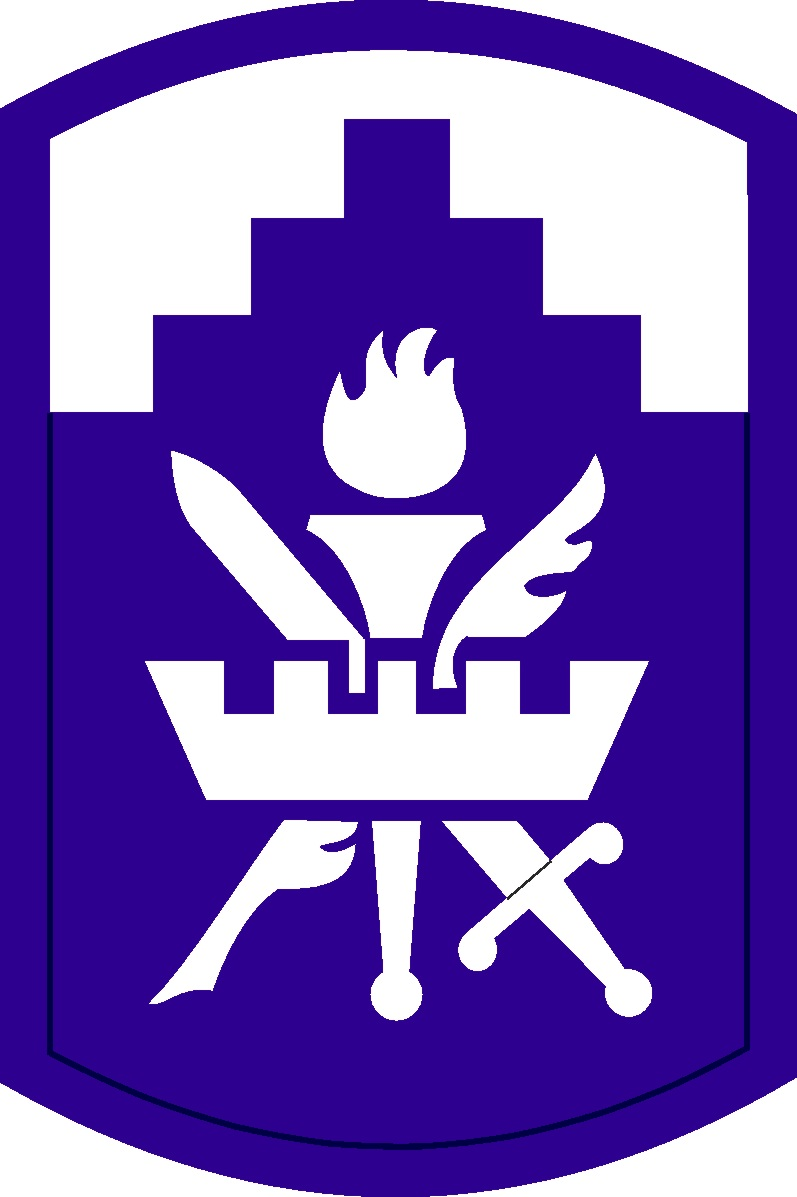
- Former shoulder sleeve insignia

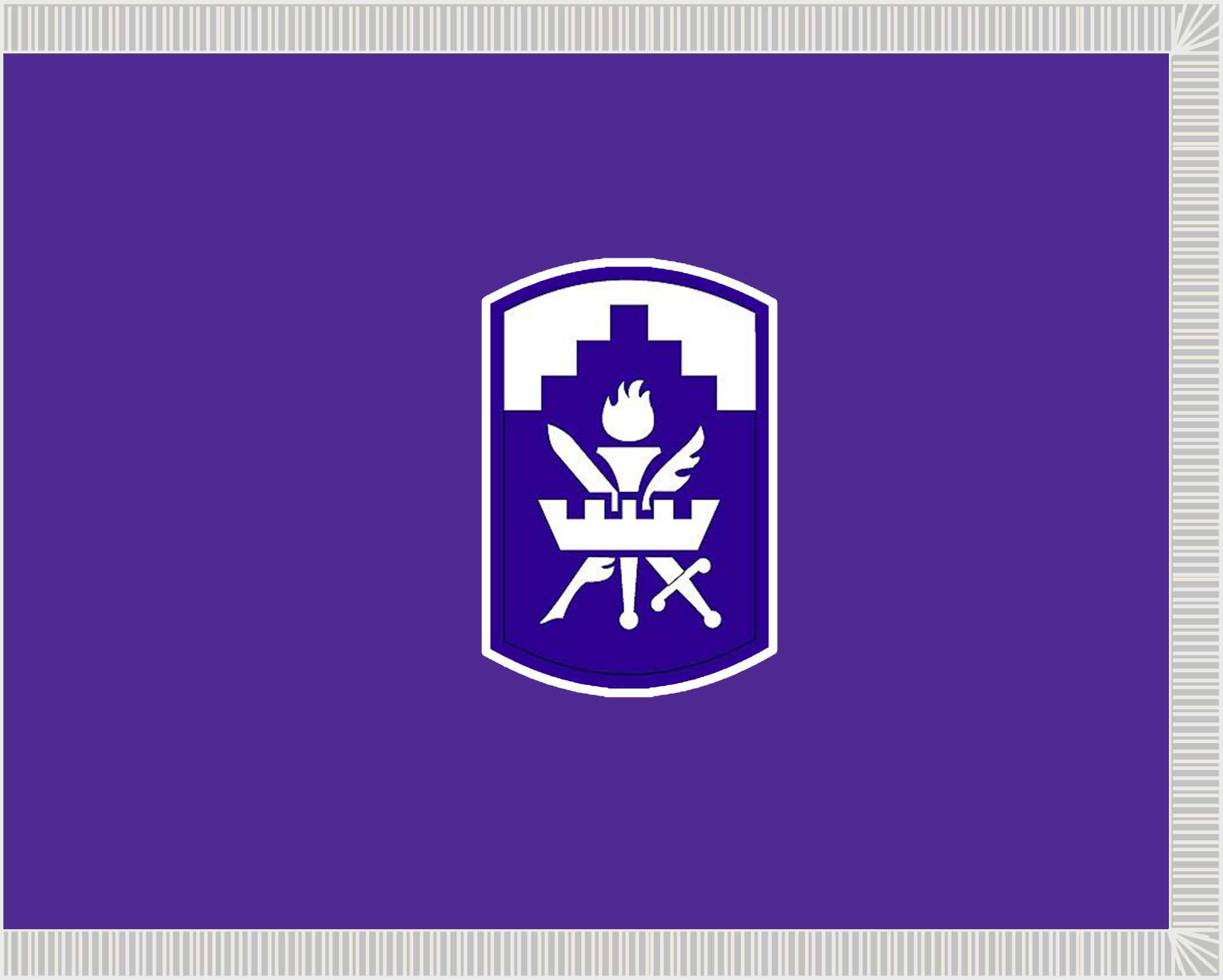
- 353rd Civil Affairs Command Flag

The 353rd Civil Affairs Command organizes, trains, and equips assigned Civil Affairs forces to mobilize, deploy, and conduct civil military operations. On order, the 353rd Civil Affairs Command organizes, trains, and equips assigned Civil Affairs forces to mobilize, deploy, conduct civil military operations, and redeploy in order to support Geographic Combatant Commander mission requirements with focus on the US Africa and US European Command areas of responsibility.

== History ==
=== Civil Affairs History ===
The first Civil Affairs units in the U.S. Army were formed during World War II. Additional units saw service in subsequent conflicts. Civil Affairs/Military Government was established as an Army Reserve Branch on 17 August 1955. Subsequently, redesignated as the Civil Affairs Branch on 2 October 1959, its members continued its mission to provide guidance to commanders on a broad spectrum of civil affairs activities. The expansion of Civil Affairs in the Regular Army led to Civil Affairs beings established as a basic branch of the Army effective 16 October 2006 by Department of the Army General Orders (AGO) No. 29, 12 January 2007.

=== 353rd CACOM history ===
The 353d was created in New York, N.Y. as the 353d Military Government Area A Headquarters on July 14, 1952. The third commander of the unit was Colonel Frank E. Toscani, a civil affairs officer who was the inspiration for John Hersey's 1944 Novel, "A Bell for Adano."

COL Toscani is quoted in comprehensive volume “Civil Affairs Soldiers Become Governors”

Experience has shown that in the initial stages of the landing at Salerno/Paestum, civilian food supplies were not properly phased and did not arrive on time. Since then, we have organized a system of supplies which has worked with marked success to the extent that communes were supplied within 48 hours after liberation during the offensive of the 5th Army of May–September 1944.

A small piece of the memo but one can see that a primary concern of the Civil Affairs Soldier is the wellbeing of the civilian population. One of the most basic units of human need is food. CA Soldiers past and present can be the vital link needed to provide a population with immediate calories and the tools/venue for a population to regain the ability sustain itself after/during conflict.

In 1968, the 353d relocated from Manhattan's West Side to the Patterson USAR Center in the Bronx. Seven years later, the 353d was designed as a civil affairs command. During the 1970s, the 353d shifted its focus from local community and civic activities to an international role. This role included command of several units of other branches, and the mission of housing and relocating 20,000 Cuban refugees from the Mariel boatlift in 1980. The 353d gained in prestige, becoming a leader in the civil affairs community. This period culminated in the development of memoranda of understanding and, in 1981, capstone assignments to Headquarters, U.S. Army Europe (USAEUR) for a civil military cooperation (CIMIC) mission and assignment of CIMIC teams to USAREUR's major subordinate commands.

In 1984, the 353d's role grew again. This time it incorporated CA/CIMIC staff assistance to Headquarters, U.S. European Command (USEUCOM) in West Germany and the U.S. Army Southern European Task Force (USASETAF) in Vicenza, Italy. In major CIMIC exercises, the 353d fielded up to 450 CA operators in Europe. In December 1989, as directed by the newly formed United States Army Reserve Special Operations Command (USARSOC), Fort Bragg, N.C., the 353d deployed two dozen Soldiers to participate in Operation Just Cause in Panama. Within a year, USARSOC was designated as the United States Army Civil Affairs and Psychological Operations Command (Airborne) [USACAPOC(A)], as headquartered at Fort Bragg.

Starting in June 1999, 353d Soldier took part in Operation Joint Guardian in Kosovo. The deployment followed the signing of the Military Technical Agreement (MTA) by NATO. Their mission was to conduct civil military operations in Kosovo in support of United Nations Security Council Resolution 1244.

Early in the new millennium, the 353d supported a variety of exercises in Eastern Europe and Africa. The unit took part in Operations Enduring Freedom and Operation Iraqi Freedom (OIF). The 353d was activated for OIF-II and assumed command of its subordinate units in Iraq upon arrival. In 2006, civil affairs units were reassigned from USSOCOM to United States Forces Command (JFCOM), then further assigned to the United States Army Reserve Command (USARC).

The command historically supported military operations in Africa, Afghanistan and Europe.

The command has pivoted its focus to Europe as of 2021.

== Organization ==
The command is a subordinate unit of the Civil Affairs and Psychological Operations Command (Airborne). As of January 2026 the command consists of the following units:

- 353rd Civil Affairs Command, in Fort Wadsworth (NY)
  - Headquarters and Headquarters Company, at Fort Wadsworth (NY)
  - 2nd Psychological Operations Group, at Twinsburg (OH)
    - Headquarters and Headquarters Company, at Twinsburg (OH)
    - 11th Psychological Operations Battalion, in Upper Marlboro (MD)
    - 13th Psychological Operations Battalion, in Arden Hills (MN)
    - 15th Psychological Operations Battalion (Airborne), in Cincinnati (OH)
    - 16th Psychological Operations Battalion, in Lake Forest (IL)
    - 326th Psychological Operations Company (Strategic Dissemination), at Fort Gillem (GA)
  - 304th Civil Affairs Brigade, in Bristol (PA)
    - Headquarters and Headquarters Company, at Bristol (PA)
    - 403rd Civil Affairs Battalion, in Mattydale (NY)
    - 411th Civil Affairs Battalion, in Danbury (CT)
    - 443rd Civil Affairs Battalion, at Naval Station Newport (RI)
    - 486th Civil Affairs Battalion, in Tulsa (OK)
  - 308th Civil Affairs Brigade, in Homewood (IL)
    - Headquarters and Headquarters Company, at Homewood (IL)
    - 407th Civil Affairs Battalion, in Arden Hills (MN)
    - 415th Civil Affairs Battalion, in Kalamazoo (MI)
    - 418th Civil Affairs Battalion, in Belton (MO)
    - 432nd Civil Affairs Battalion, in Green Bay (WI)

== Former Subordinate units ==
- 404th Civil Affairs Battalion (Airborne)—Fort Dix, New Jersey—Realigned to the 360th Civil Affairs Brigade (Airborne) on 1 October 2021

== Insignia ==
CA Branch Insignia

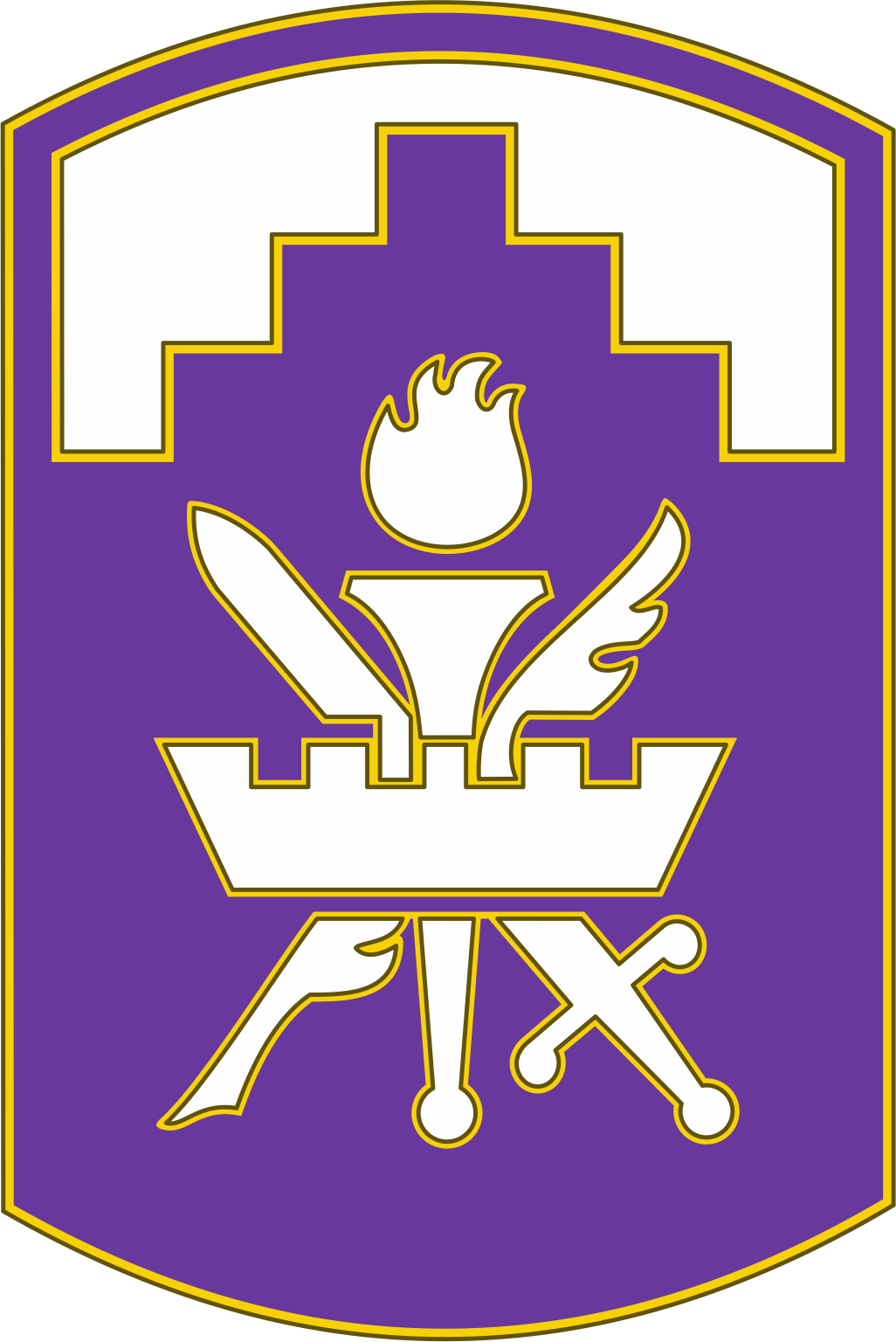
353rd CACOM's former Combat Service Identification Badge

=== Description/Blazon ===
A gold color metal and enamel device 1 1/8 inches (2.9 cm) in height overall consisting of a gold rolled scroll tied with a purple sealed ribbon, the scroll inclined to the upper left and the base conjoined with the point of a gold sword inclined with hilt in upper right, all in front of and flanking a gold symbol of man with outstretched arms touching the scroll and sword, and all upon the upper section of a white globe with gold grid lines, between a three-tongued red flame on each side and in front of gold rays throughout; all within a purple scroll inscribed "ORDER" at the top, looped in back of the top of the scroll and sword hilt and inscribed "GOVERNMENT FREEDOM" at the sides and base in gold letters.

=== Symbolism ===
Purple and white are colors used for Civil Affairs. The stylized figure denotes the human factors which are essential elements of Civil Affairs operations. The sealed scroll represents the establishment of order through law and together with the rays of light signifies government with freedom. The enflamed globe and sword allude to the aftermath of battle and also connote the military - political capabilities of the organization.

=== Shoulder Sleeve Insignia ===
The shoulder sleeve insignia was approved on 10 Feb 1977. The quill, sword and civic crown are symbolic of planning, training and readiness requisite to the United States Army's conduct of civic affairs and military government operations in countries in which United States Armed Forces are or may employed. The torch alludes to guidance and the vertical rises or steps simulate the silhouette of the Manhattan skyline adjoining the home area and location of the organization. The 353rd Civil Affairs Command is based at Ft. Wadsworth, Staten Island, New York. Prior to that, it was headquartered in the Bronx, NY.

=== Background ===
The distinctive unit insignia was originally approved for 353d Civil Affairs Area (A) on 27 May 1970. It was redesignated for the 353d Civil Affairs Command on 9 December 1976.

== Previous Commanders ==
- Colonel Robert H. Arnold 1952-1953
- Colonel Clifton A. Burriss 1953-1960
- Colonel Frank E. Toscani 1960-1966
- Brigadier General Leo A. Santini* 1966-1972
- Brigadier General Pellegrino Bavetta 1972-1977
- Brigadier General James P. Harley 1977-1981
- Brigadier General Harry J. Mott III 1981-1983
- Brigadier General George E. Barker 1983-1984
- Brigadier General Michael A. Boyd 1985-1989
- Brigadier General Donald F. Campbell 1989-1993
- Brigadier General Thomas J. Matthews 1993-1997
- Brigadier General Sam E. Gibson 1997-2001
- Brigadier General Paulette M. Risher 2001-2002
- Brigadier General Steven J. Hashem 2002-2005
- Brigadier General Guy L. Sands-Pingot 2005-2008
- Brigadier General William J. Gothard 2008-2010
- Brigadier General Hugh C. Van Roosen II 2010-2012
- Brigadier General Daniel R. Ammerman 2012-2015
- Brigadier General Glenn A. Goddard 2014-2017
- Brigadier General Robert S. Cooley Jr. 2017-2020
- Brigadier General Timothy E. Brennan 2020–2022
- Brigadier General Dean P. Thompson 2022–2024 BIO
- Colonel Clifton Kyle (Acting Commander) 2024

== 353d Civil Affairs Command European Mission ==
On 1 October 2021 353d Civil Affairs Command pivoted its focus to Europe. In order to meet current and future operational demands, the 353d Civil Affairs Command transitions its U.S. Africa Command civil affairs support and command relationship responsibilities to the 352d CACOM. Allowing the 353d to concentrate its two brigades on civil affairs operations and civil affairs activities in the U.S. European Command area of operations.

“Change is good and necessary to maintain relevancy into an ever-changing future,” said Brig. Gen. Timothy Brennan, the Commanding General of the 353d CACOM. “The 353d will focus the entirety of the command on the European area of responsibility.” "By aligning our resources and our geographic focus on priority areas, we (USACAPOC(A)) can provide better support to our mission partners,” Brennan added.

In addition to this realignment, the 353d CACOM transfers the 404th Civil Affairs Battalion (Airborne) to the 352d CACOM and assumes the 486th Civil Affairs Battalion from the 350th CACOM.

The 404th CA BN (A) a storied civil affairs unit has long served under 353d CACOM within the 304th Civil Affairs Brigade. The 486th CA BN, headquartered in Tulsa, Oklahoma, will now be part of the 353d CACOM team.

“We wish the 404th the best of luck and welcome the 486th to the team,” Brennan said. "The 404th has a remarkable history and lineage. It has been a unit within the Army since 1948 and with the 353d since the early 1970s.”

While the 353d CACOM previously focused its efforts on missions with AFRICOM and EUCOM, the shift will help to further strengthen relationships in countries such as the United Kingdom, France, Belgium, Netherlands, Luxembourg, Germany, and more.

“The 353d CACOM Soldiers will be able to focus on Europe, providing an opportunity to build relations and gain a better understanding of the European theater,” Lt. Col. J. Zeke Pittard, Deputy, G-3, 353d CACOM added. “It’s an opportunity to build enduring relationships with our supported commands at every level, as well as with our allies and partners in Europe.”

== COVID-19 ==
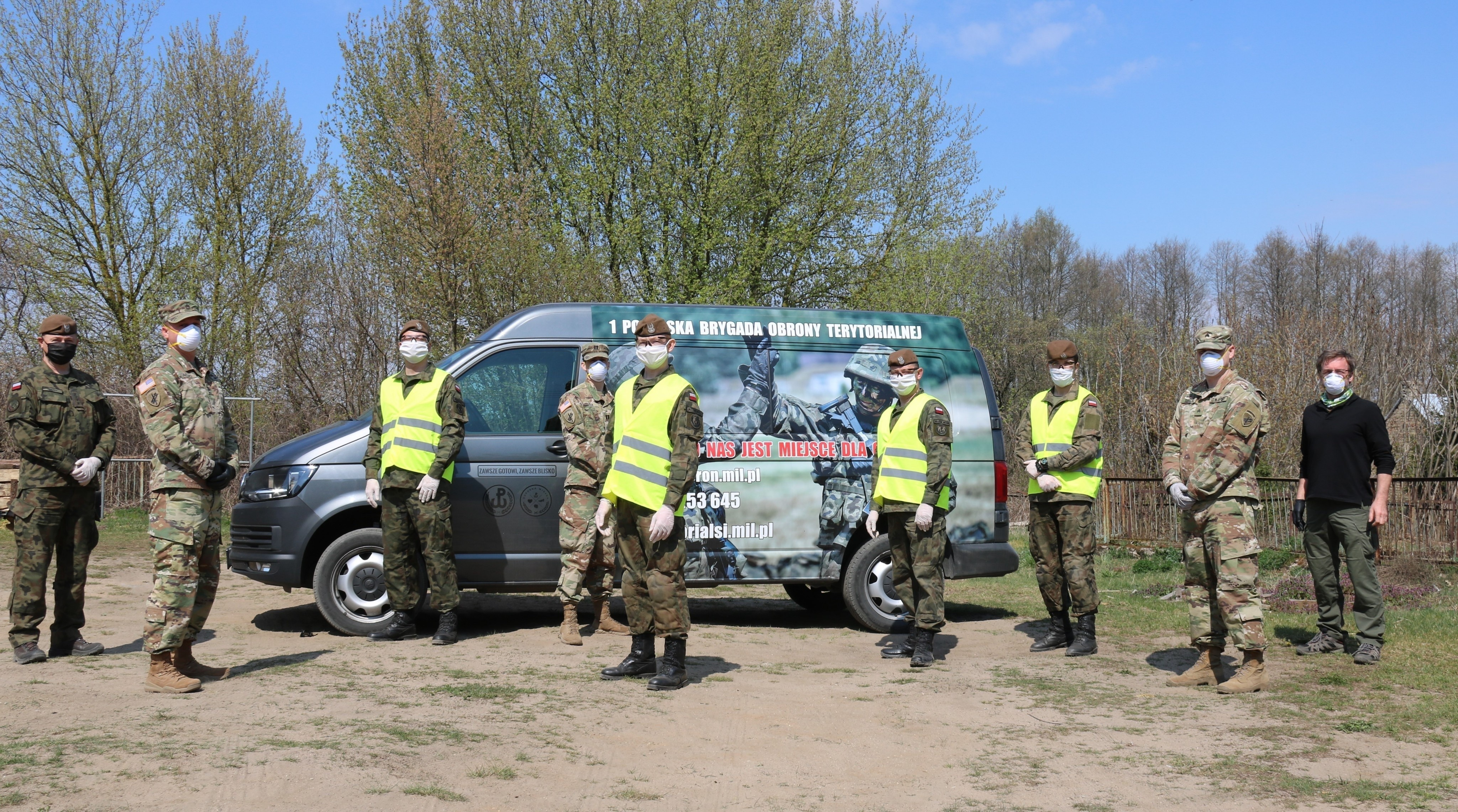
353rd CACOM Soldiers deliver food in to aid those in need due to COVID-19

Civil Affairs is a unique military function that allows Soldiers to engage in rewarding and vital work. In response to COVID-19 soldiers from the 353rd CACOM provide humanitarian aid in Poland.

Soldiers from Bravo Company, 418th Civil Affairs Battalion, 308th Civil Affairs Brigade, 1st Infantry Division Forward, 353rd Civil Affairs Command, worked with Polish forces from 1st Brigade, Territorial Defense Force here. The U.S. Soldiers and Polish service members distributed food to local authorities and medical facilities on April 28, 2020, in Monki, Poland, in support of Operation Resilient Spring (ORS). ORS is a Polish initiative that aims to strengthen the resiliency of local communities in Poland during the COVID-19 pandemic, as well as to support local authorities and medical facilities through the distribution of food. Polish TDF and Soldiers from the 418th Civil Affairs Battalion will continue to interoperate throughout the COVID-19 pandemic to support local communities in Poland.

== Rapid Trident-19 ==
Among other duties members of 407th Civil Affairs Battalion, we are going to assessed a water facility and a power facility,” along with a group of service members from Ukraine, the United Kingdom and United States. Each person in the group is specialized in civil affairs skills that bring different perspectives to the formation of the Civil-Military Cooperation (CIMIC) teams.

== Solving Critical Needs ==
The USASOC Historians Office have provided the public with a "calling card" which explains Civil Affairs Soldiers as such: "Tactically proficient soldiers who promote stabilization by advising foreign governments on improving legitimacy and by helping locals solve critical needs.

Civil Affairs Calling Cards

== Reserve Component Military Government (MG) Specialist (38G) ==
The 38G program is a unique and vital component of USACAPOC, 38Gs will be integral to the 353 CACOM force structure.

Reserve Soldiers are a diverse and essential energy that drives the US Army Reserve enabling it to support the Regular Army. The dynamic interchange is grassroots and enables the many strategic, security, and humanitarian missions we face as a nation. The 38G program opens doors to qualified citizens and soldiers to serve the nation. The diverse citizens of this nation are our strength. The 38G program recognizes the candidates for their individual accomplishments in their civilian careers.

“353rd CACOM's home is New York City, long viewed as a thriving melting pot of cultures and backgrounds, a cultural tour-de-force the world over it is fitting that the 353rd CACOM draw on this pool of amazing talent for the 38G program.” BG Brennan

Many people may have become familiar with the historic forebear of the current 38G program. The Monuments Men of WWII who worked under austere and challenging conditions to preserve the heritage of the world as displayed in art and artifacts were justly immortalized in the movie by the same name.

“The Army is training a new group with a similar mandate to be composed of commissioned officers of the Army Reserves who are museum directors or curators, archivists, conservators and archaeologists in addition to new recruits with those qualifications. “

Similar to the previous endeavors of the Monuments Men the Smithsonian is a vital partner.

Unlike the WWII iteration the current 38G program seeks to draw upon a wider part of the population with diverse skills and interests.

“The 38G Area of Concentration is structured under five functional specialty areas: economic stability and infrastructure, governance and participation, justice and reconciliation, security, and humanitarian assistance and social well-being.“

The below charts explain some of the identifiers which are skills prospective 38Gs can bring to the Army.

Economy & Infrastructure Sector

4A: Industry and Production

4F: Energy

5Y: Emergency Management

6C: Finance, Money & Banking

6E: Commerce & Trade

6F: Transportation

6G: Water & Sanitation

6R: Technology & Telecommunications

6U: Agri-Business & Food

Government & Administration Sector

4C: Civil Administration

4D: Laws, Regulations, & Policies

4E: Environment & Natural Resources

Rule of Law & Civil Security Sector

4G: Judiciary & Legal System

4H: Corrections

6H: Law & Border Enforcement

Public & Social Services Sector

6D: Education

6V: Cultural Heritage Preservation

6W: Archivist

As explained by the Army Times: AOC 38G resides exclusively in the Army Reserve, National Guard and Individual Ready Reserve officers who are selected by the September panel must transfer to the Army Reserve to be assigned to the new AOC.

Basic Functional Skill Practitioner — lieutenants and captains who hold a bachelor's degree or higher in an academic discipline that correlates to one of the Civil Affairs skill identifiers listed above.

Senior Functional Skill Practitioner — captains and majors who hold a master's degree in a CA-related skill and who have at least 48 months of work experience in a career field relating to the CA skill.

Expert Functional Skill Practitioner — majors and lieutenant colonels with a master's degree and at least 96 months of work experience in an appropriate CA-related skill, and professional certification from a certifying body recognized by the Army's Special Warfare Center and School.

Master Functional Skill Practitioner — lieutenant colonels and colonels with a doctoral degree, and/or 144 months of appropriate work experience, terminal professional certification recognized by the Army, completion of rank-appropriate professional military education and have not been passed over for promotion to the next higher grade.

“We are asking qualified people to take stock of their many accomplishments and consider using their talents to help us in our worthy causes.” BG Brennan

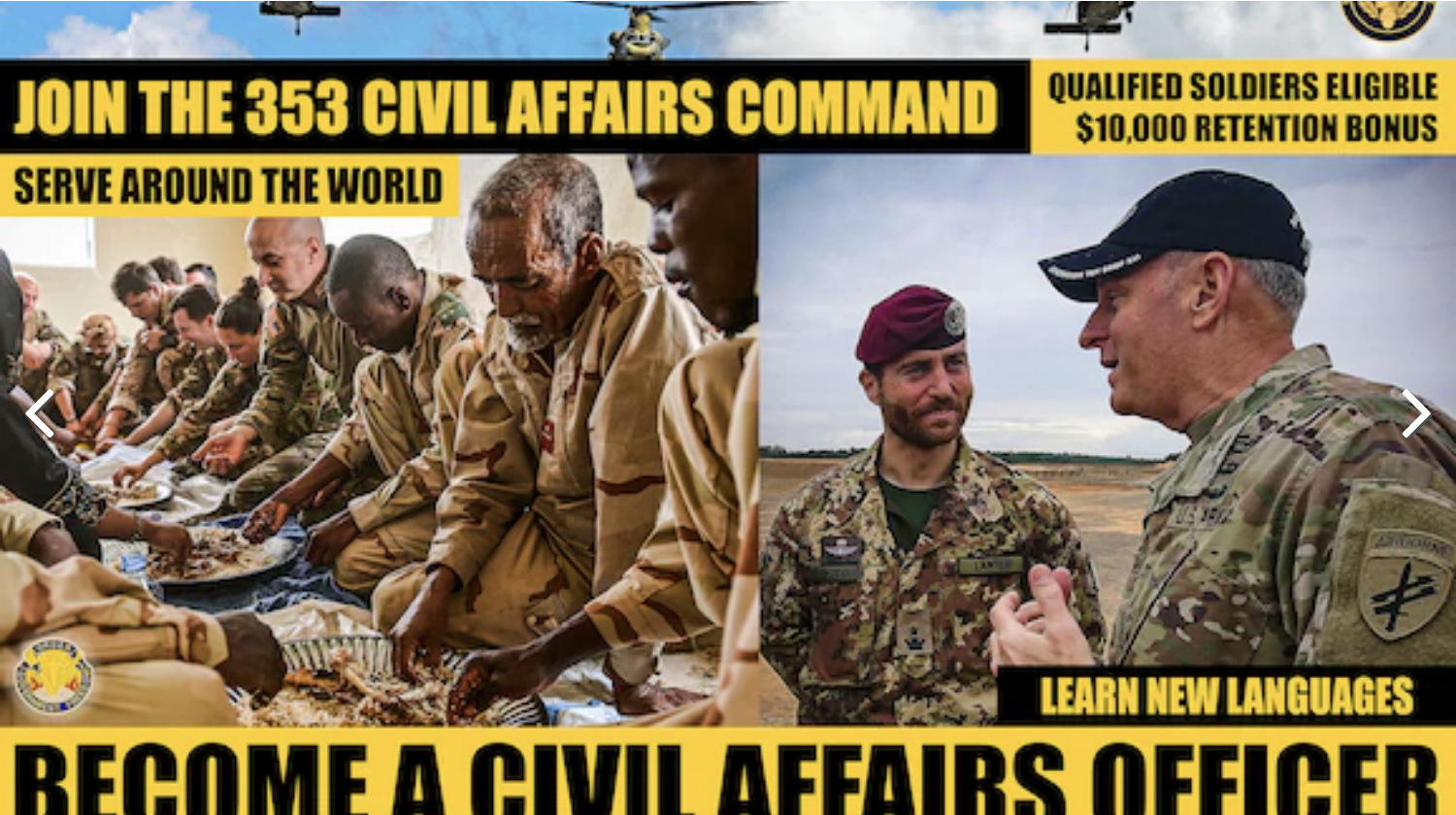
Join the 353 Civil Affairs Officer

== History, Legacy, Future. ==
“In the midst of the large-scale combat operations of World War II, the Army was called on to occupy, to govern, and to help rehabilitate complex, war-torn countries and economies. Few of its task turned out to be as difficult and challenging as these civil affairs missions”.

“Because of the ideological aspect of the struggle and because the United States acted as a member of a coalition of Allies, U.S. military leaders sometimes had to add to their traditional roles as soldiers those of the statesman and the politician. They were beset by the problems of resolving conflicting national interests and of reconciling political idealism and military exigency. On another level-in feeding hungry populations, in tackling intricate financial and economic problems, and in protecting the cultural heritage of a rich and ancient civilization-they had to exercise skills that are also normally considered civilian rather than military”.

— From “Soldiers Become Governors”

The mission of the WWII CA Soldier, dealt primarily with civil administration in Italy, France, and northwest Europe. “Soldiers Become Governors” illustrates certain basic and generic problems of civil affairs their character, the approaches to their solution, and their impact upon the people who had to deal with them. Current CA Soldiers face and have faced many of the same challenges as their forebears. It is fair to say that in GWOT CA Soldiers faced down and met with aplomb complex and demanding problem sets. Problem sets that need the CA Soldier to balance the warrior and the diplomat. It is likely the world will continue to need people to take up the life-giving sword wielded by CA Soldiers in the interest of Order, Government and Freedom.
