= 304th Brigade =

304th Brigade may refer to:

== United Kingdom ==
- 304th Infantry Brigade

== United States ==
- 304th Civil Affairs Brigade
- 304th Sustainment Brigade
- 304th Tank Brigade

== See also ==
- 304th Regiment (disambiguation)
