= General Mott =

General Mott may refer to:

- Gershom Mott (1822–1884), U.S. Army major general
- Harry J. Mott III (1929–2023), U.S. Army brigadier general
- Stanley Mott (1873–1959), British Army major general
