= 411th Civil Affairs Battalion (United States) =

411th Civil Affairs Battalion (Tactical)
- 411th Civil Affairs Bn coat of arms
- Country: United States
- Branch: United States Army Reserve
- Type: Civil Affairs
- Role: civil-military operations
- Part of: 304th Civil Affairs Brigade
- Garrison/HQ: Danbury Veterans' Memorial Armed Forces Reserve Center, Danbury CT
- Nickname: 'Fighting 411th' / 'Tip of the CA Spear' / 'Mad Hatter Battalion'
- Mottos: "Perge Modo, Restitimus"
- Engagements: World War II; United States invasion of Panama; Operation Promote Liberty (Panama); Gulf War; Operation Provide Comfort; Operation Uphold Democracy; Operation Sea Signal (Cuba); Operation Joint Endeavor (Bosnia); Operation Joint Guard (Bosnia); Operation Joint Forge (Bosnia); Operation Joint Guardian (Kosovo); Operation Noble Eagle; Iraq War; Operation Enduring Freedom X Operation Enduring Freedom - Horn of Africa; American military intervention in Niger

Commanders
- Current commander: Lt. Colonel Brendan Quinn

411th Civil Affairs Battalion (Tactical) is a civil affairs (CA) unit of the United States Army. It is based at Danbury, Connecticut. The unit includes Alpha, Bravo, Charlie, Delta and Headquarters (HHC) Companies, all located in Danbury. The battalion has been involved in almost every conflict or major operation since Operation Just Cause in Panama in 1989, most recently serving in Niger from 2019.

== History ==
The history of the 411th Civil Affairs Battalion begins in 1945 with the establishment of the 399th Civil Affairs Group, which served in the Pacific Theatre. It was later transferred to the Army Reserve and located in Danbury, Connecticut. The 411th Military Government Company was established in 1949 and located in West Hartford, Connecticut. In 1959 the unit was re-designated as the 411th Civil Affairs Company and transferred to Hartford, Connecticut. In 1978, with the drawdown of CA forces after the Vietnam War, the 399th was deactivated and its personnel assigned to the newly created Detachment 1 of the 411th CA Company, still located in Danbury. In 1991, the 411th was reconstituted as a battalion and consolidated in Danbury the following year.

=== 1980s and 1990s ===
In late 1989, various 411th soldiers volunteered for service in Operations Just Cause and Promote Liberty in Panama. In December 1990 teams were mobilized and deployed to Operations Desert Shield and Desert Storm in support of the storied 3rd Armored Division, which was part of the VII Corps effort to liberate Kuwait. Several 411th soldiers also participated in Operation Provide Comfort to support humanitarian operations in Kurdistan (northern Iraq and neighboring Turkey).

Operation Uphold Democracy in Haiti during 1994 saw individuals supporting Special Forces in humanitarian operations. The following year, 34 soldiers from the 411th deployed to the Guantanamo Bay Naval Base in support of humanitarian efforts for Cuban refugees as part of a Presidential Selected Reserve Call Up. Operation Sea Signal foretold the growing demand for civil affairs soldiers worldwide.

From December 1995 to January 1997, the 411th provided teams for peace implementation in Bosnia and Herzegovina called Operation Joint Endeavor. This was followed up by peacekeeping operations from 1997 through 1999 in Bosnia and Herzegovina (Operations Joint Guard and Joint Forge). This support for peacekeeping operations set the trend for future CA support of international efforts to aid war-torn countries, exemplified by the 411th's participation in Operation Joint Guardian in Kosovo from 1999 through 2000.

=== 2000s ===
Immediately following the 11 September 2001 attacks, members of the battalion volunteered to assist in recovery efforts at 'Ground Zero' in lower Manhattan. This effort marked the beginning of the 411th's contributions to the Global War on Terrorism as part of Operations Noble Eagle and Enduring Freedom.

For Operation Iraqi Freedom in February 2003, the 411th provided two direct support detachments in support of numerous units including the 1st Marine Expeditionary Force, 3rd Infantry Division, 82nd and 101st Airborne Divisions, 2nd and 3rd Armored Cavalry Regiments, 1st Armored Division and the Coalition Provisional Authority. Bravo Detachment was the first to enter Iraq. Alpha detachment moved into Iraq on 5 April 2003 in support of combat operations, remaining until March 2004.

At Camp Arifjan, Kuwait, personnel from Alpha worked closely with Brigadier General Kern (352nd CACOM commander) and his staff in developing the final OIF Civil Affairs plan. At Najaf, Alpha was reconstituted and it deployed teams in support of ongoing 2nd ACR field missions in villages surrounding the city. This included establishing a mobile civil-military operations center.

On 22 April 2003, Alpha established the first civil-military operations center (CMOC) in Baghdad, located immediately behind the UN compound. Alpha coordinated the development of detailed procedures to address issues raised by the local Iraqi population, including establishing lines of communication with the remaining Iraqi government representatives and local Non-Governmental Organizations (NGOs) in the area in order to address issues of the local populace. Between its opening on 22 April 2003 and its handover to Iraqi personnel in September, the 'UN CMOC' had over 5,800 visitors and handled over 3,900 reports. Reported issues included reports on UXOs, looting, missing persons, requests for assistance, security, and a whole gamut of other topics.

Based upon assessments conducted by its Civil Affairs Teams, Alpha developed detailed determinations of work required and secured the funding for over 150 public works projects to address deficiencies in the local infrastructure. Over $1 million in Commander's discretionary funds were allocated to pay for these projects. Alpha generated over 125 humanitarian projects to address the needs of the local populace, including the delivery of 30 tons of food, over 100,000 humanitarian rations, over 5 million litres of water, 8 tons of medical supplies and 8 tons of school supplies.

Alpha took the lead in establishing Baghdad's first Internal Displaced Persons (IDP) relocation area (then known as Hillsdale). Alpha coordinated the 1st ID's IDP program, including the development of the plans to address IDPs located in various Ministry buildings. This included overseeing the construction of 56 housing units for the relocation of over 50 families to Hillsdale from the ministries.

On 19 August 2003, Alpha was engaged during the terrorist attack by Jama'at al-Tawhid wal-Jihad (renamed the 'Islamic State' in 2014) on the United Nations compound in Baghdad. Suffering damage to its building and having six soldiers wounded, it immediately reacted to the attack and deployed its personnel to repel a potential second attack as well as to provide aid to the wounded. Alpha personnel were first to arrive at the scene and were instrumental in establishing order out of chaos early at the scene of the attack. Command of the entire operation was the responsibility of Alpha until the later arrival of follow-on units. First Sergeant William von Zehle's efforts to rescue UN Special Envoy Sérgio Vieira de Mello were subsequently chronicled in the documentary Sergio (2009 film) and the 2020 biographical drama Sergio (2020 film). The actions of detachment personnel were personally recognized by President George W. Bush, General Richard Myers (Chairman of the Joint Chiefs of Staff), Lieutenant General James Helmly (Chief, Army Reserve) and Kofi Annan (Secretary General, United Nations).

Bravo Company of the 411th holds the distinction of being the first Civil Affairs company to enter Iraq as a complete unit. While traveling north with the 3rd ID and the 82nd Division, Bravo conducted CA operations in ten major Iraqi cities including Najaf, Hilla and Karbala. The unit was also part of the first U.S. forces to enter Fallujah and Ramadi before settling into Baghdad. Bravo completed over 1,000 projects in southern, western and central Iraq worth in excess of $32 million. The unit was also instrumental in removing over 2,000 war hulks, cleaning city streets of trash and sewage while employing thousands of laborers and distributing hundreds of thousands of dollars to civic employees.

The two companies redeployed after 13 months, returning in March 2004. The 411th also provided 11 trained civil affairs soldiers for OIF rotation two. In August 2004, the 411th made history again by becoming the first unit to deploy twice in support of Operation Iraqi Freedom. They were the first unit to enter the country when the war began, and the first unit to return for a second trip.

As a member of Task Force 353 within Special Operations Command Central (Airborne), the 411th began arriving in August with their main body arriving in mid September. The battalion accoutered six tactical Civil Affairs companies for the 1st Infantry Division and 42nd Infantry Division. The unit provided cultural expertise, and was charged with developing the first program of instruction for Iraqi Army Civil Affairs.

The 411th coordinated Operation I CAN, which collected donations of over 20,000 tons of school supplies for direct distribution by maneuver battalions and the Iraqi Army to the children of Iraq. The 411th staffed and ran four out of six ministries at the Regional Reconstruction Operations Center, and scheduled $1,823,371,242 in reconstruction projects. The RROC was recognized by the National RROC as the best in theater and the Pentagon singled it out as the Army's model for Reconstruction Operations Centers. The battalion also operated three Provincial Civil Military Operations Centers, a Civil Military Coordination Center, the Division Projects Coordination Cell, oversaw the division's Civil Military Information Center for detainee operations, and provided staffing to the division G5 and G3-G5 Planning Cell.

Over 725 major humanitarian projects were successfully processed totaling in excess of $81,000,000. 411th personnel developed an effective project which tracked the progress of the programs from inception to completion; and were instrumental in the Commander's Emergency Response Program (CERP) obligation rate improvement from 28% in October 2004 to 65% in April 2005.

During OIF III the battalion organized 19 Civil Affairs direct support tactical teams to provide CMO support at the maneuver battalion level. The area encompassed nine major cities and thousands of smaller towns and villages throughout the four provinces in AO Liberty, a total of 28,300 square miles (73,000 km^{2}), overseeing over one and half billion dollars in scheduled reconstruction projects. Companies of the 411th supported operations such as Operations Attleboro, Baton Rouge, City Park, Forsyth Park, Southern Storm, Niagara Falls, King's Mountain, Peacemaker, Ad Duluyah Sunrise, Powder River and others. The battalion was awarded the Meritorious Unit Citation for service in OIF III.

=== 2010s ===
The 411th deployed a company-sized element to Kandahar, Afghanistan in May 2010. During this 10-month deployment, the members of the unit worked alongside the US State Department, USAID, the 1/4 BCT of the 4th Infantry Division and with Canadian Light Infantry and CIMIC forces. The 411th HHC was instrumental in initiating, managing and completing nearly $22 million in infrastructure projects to include numerous road projects, well refurbishments, providing education supplies, delivering humanitarian aid and assisting in school refurbishments. Members of the unit also worked in conjunction with the Provincial Reconstruction Team throughout the city of Kandahar and in nearby rural areas.

The 411th deployed teams to the Horn of Africa in July 2009. The 411th provided Host Nation Support in support of Combined Joint Task Force - Horn of Africa with sharing of best practices and partner nation building in several countries in the region. Teams from the 411th remained in theater until mid-2013 when they rotated home.

As of July 2019, members of the 411th were stationed at Niger Air Base 201 in Niger.

== Unit decorations ==
The unit received a Meritorious Unit Commendation in 2008 for service in Iraq in 2004–2005.

The unit was also awarded a Meritorious Unit Commendation in 2011 for service in Kandahar, Afghanistan.

== See also ==
- Civil-military co-operation
