= 308th Civil Affairs Brigade =

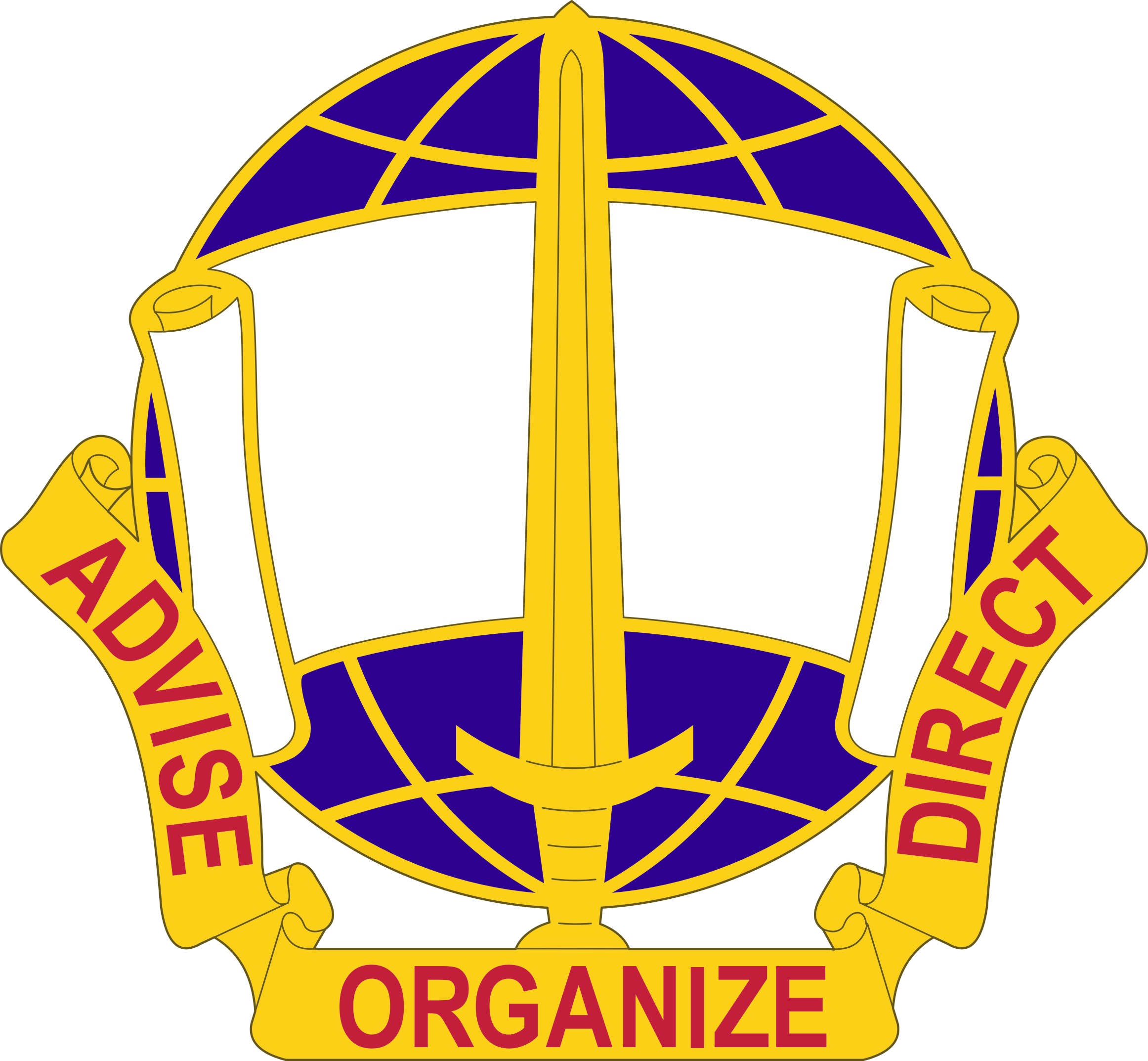
- 308th Civil Affairs Brigade's Distinctive Unit Insignia
- Active: 1949-present
- Country: United States
- Branch: United States Army Reserve
- Role: Civil Affairs
- Size: Brigade
- Garrison/HQ: Homewood, Illinois
- Motto: Advise Organize Direct
- Website: https://www.facebook.com/308thCivilAffairsBrigade/

Commanders
- Current commander: Col. Michael Hanneken
- Command Sergeant Major: CSM Poma

Insignia
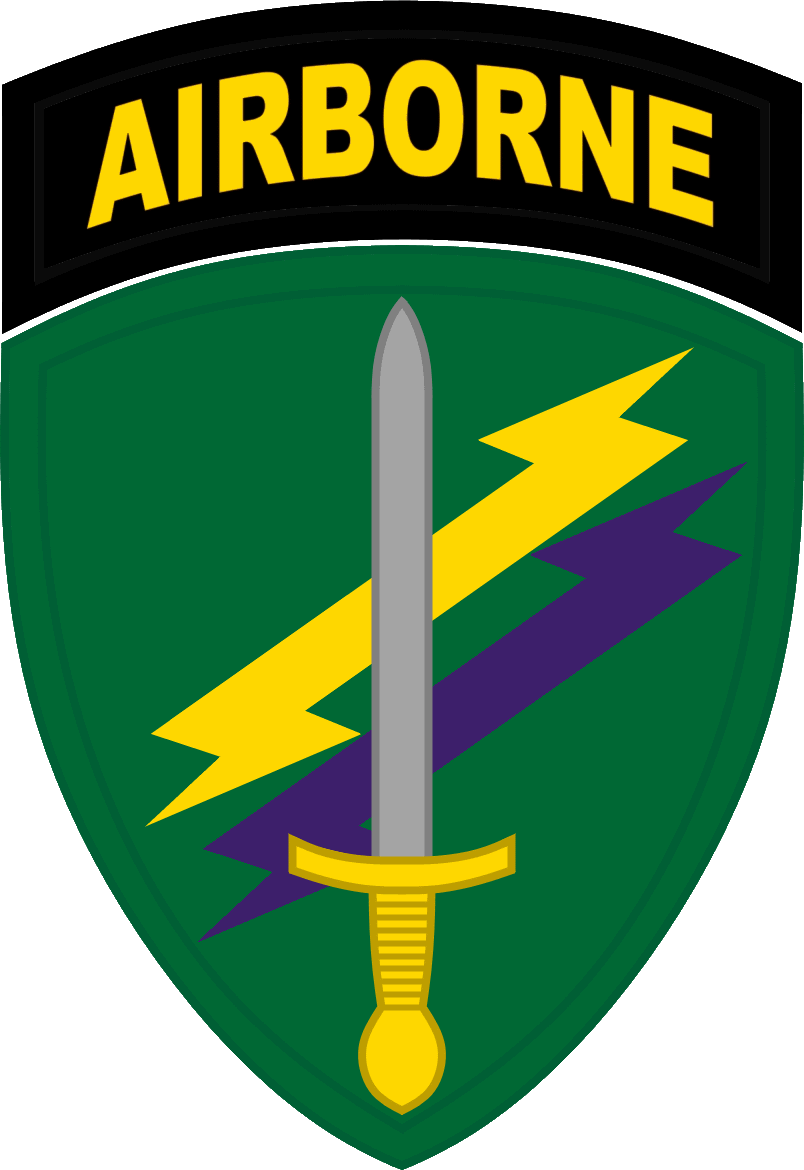
- USACAPOC Shoulder Sleeve Insignia worn by all subordinate units

- Former Shoulder Sleeve Insignia of the 308th Civil Affairs Brigade

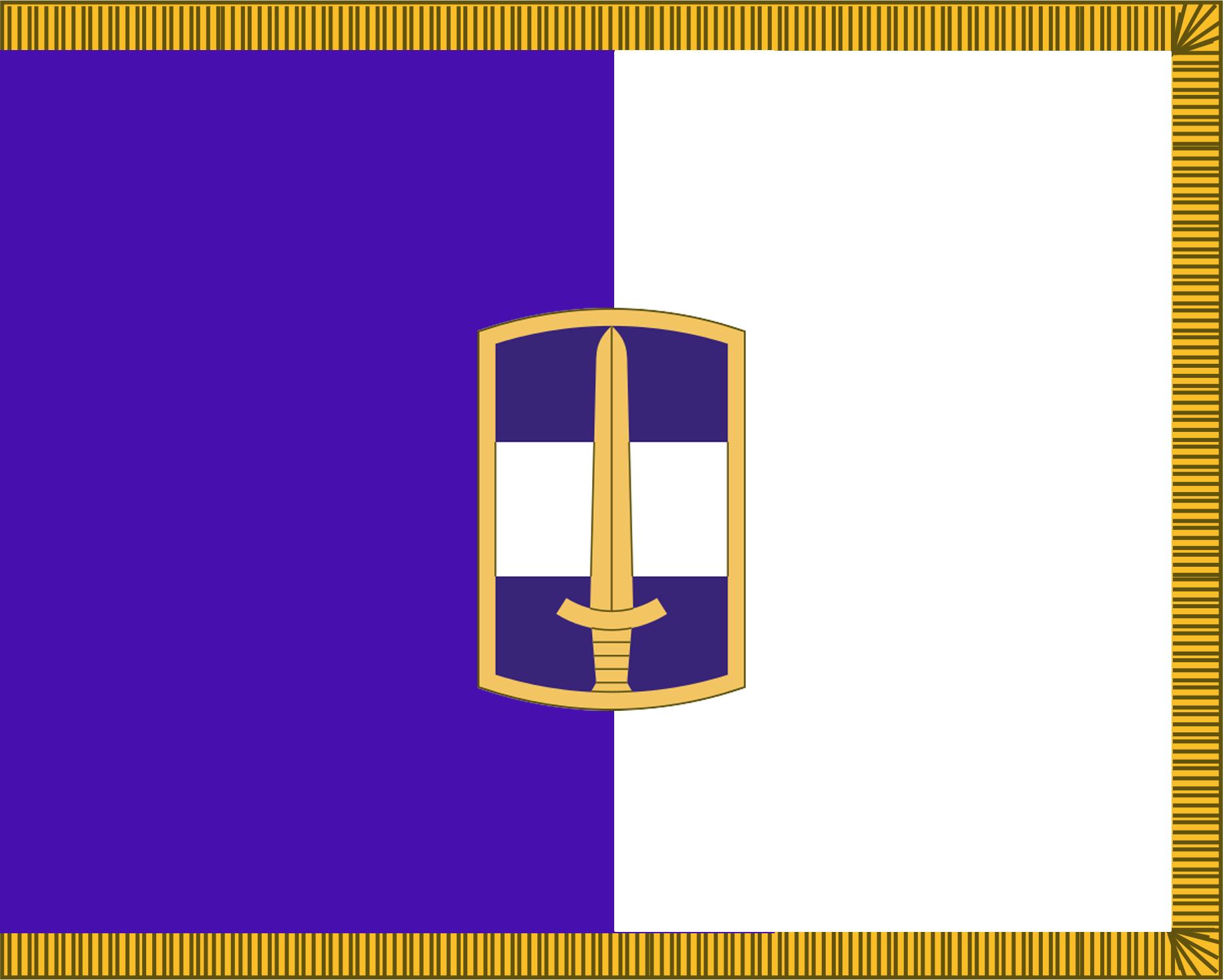
- 308th Civil Affairs Brigade Flag

The 308th Civil Affairs Brigade is a unit of the US Army Reserve. It was created in 1949 as the 308th Military Government Group in Chicago, Illinois. In 1956, it was renamed the 308th Civil Affairs and Military Government Group and moved to Evanston, IL. in 1957. It became the 308th Civil Affairs Group in 1959 and returned to Chicago in 1963. It became a brigade in 1992. Units of the brigade served in the Global War on Terror.

== Organization ==
As of January 2026, the brigade is subordinate to the 353d Civil Affairs Command and consists of the following units:

- 308th Civil Affairs Brigade, in Homewood (IL)
  - Headquarters and Headquarters Company, at Homewood (IL)
  - 407th Civil Affairs Battalion, in Arden Hills (MN)
  - 415th Civil Affairs Battalion, in Kalamazoo (MI)
  - 418th Civil Affairs Battalion, in Belton (MO)
  - 432nd Civil Affairs Battalion, in Green Bay (WI)

Each Civil Affairs Battalion consists of a Headquarters and Headquarters Company and four civil affairs companies.
