= Civil-military operations center =

Secure compound for coordinating military operations

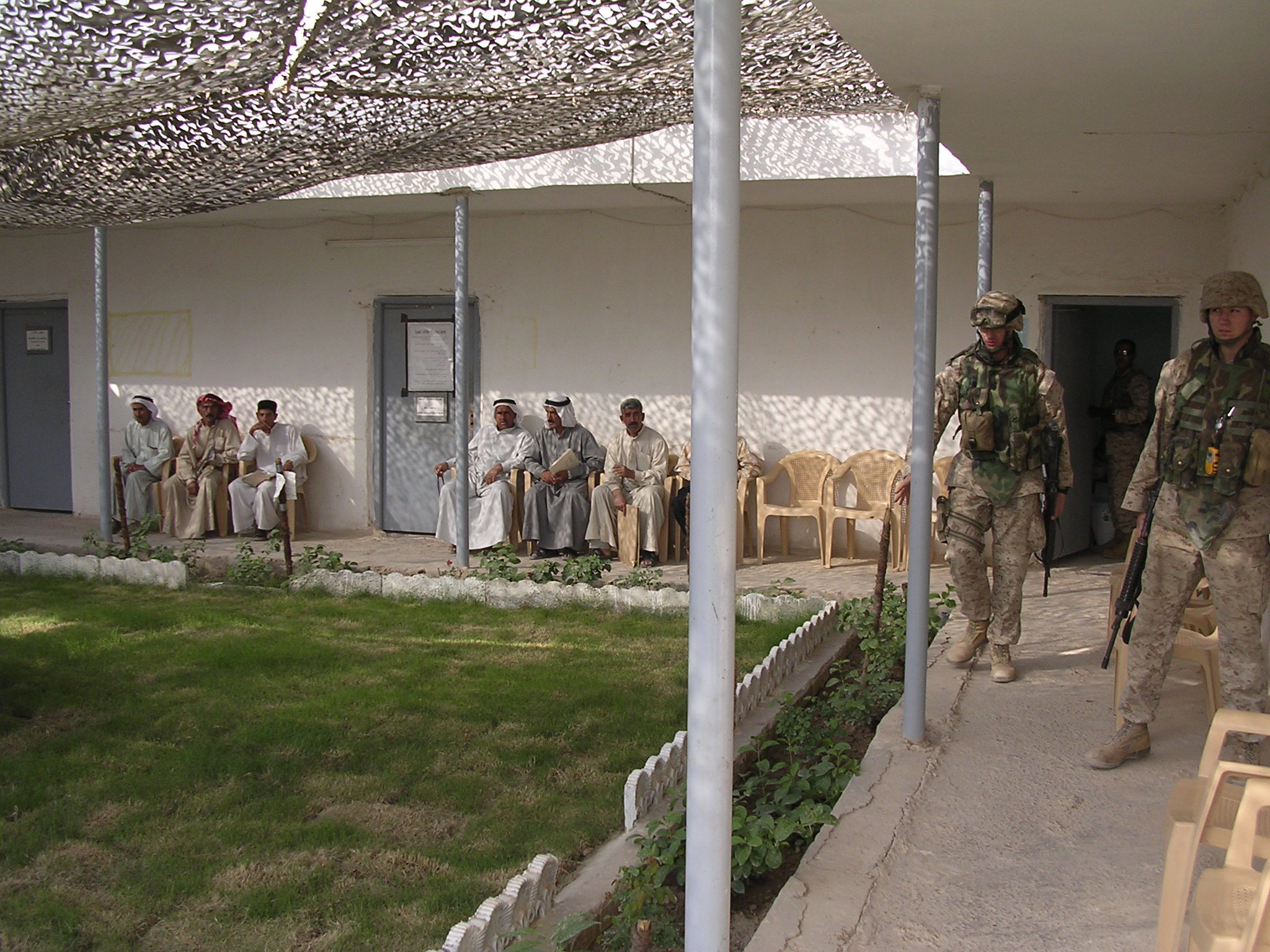
F.L.T. in Fallujah, Iraq (Fall 2004)

A Civil Military Operations Center or CMOC is a center usually established by a military force for coordinating civil-military operations in an area of operations. This center usually serves as a meeting place for military and non-military entities involved in governance, stabilization, humanitarian relief and reconstruction activities or for interaction between the entities involved in these activities and the civilian population. Often, it also serves as a central location for information on civilian related activities in the area or maintains the status of the infrastructure or institutions. During combat operations, a CMOC is usually in a secure compound.

== Temporary governance ==
A Civil Military Operations Center can be used as a place for temporary governance until the normal civilian governance is reestablished in an area impacted by military operations or natural or man-made disaster. In a military operations, temporary governance is often referred to as military governance, and is often performed by military organizations until the normal governmental body can perform these duties. This allows for the functions of governance to continue during a crisis situation.

== International operations ==
Humanitarian operations involving multiple international organizations often use other terms for a CMOC, such as combined coordination center. These centers seek to achieve coordination and unity of effort among organizations delivering humanitarian aid during disaster relief.

== Historical examples ==
=== Iraq War ===
During the Iraq War, the U.S. Marines operated a CMOC near the city of Fallujah outside of the MEK Compound. This CMOC was called the Fallujah Liaison Team or F.L.T. and it was a compound used for interaction between the Marines and the local civilians. At the F.L.T., Marines supported by U.S. Navy Seabees developed and managed reconstruction projects with local contractors. Marines also settled battle damage claims and facilitated reestablishment of local governance.

=== 2004 Indian Ocean earthquake ===
During the humanitarian response to the 2004 Indian Ocean earthquake, militaries from multiple countries worked with non-governmental organizations at a Combined Coordination Center to organize delivery of humanitarian aid to the region.
