= 304th Civil Affairs Brigade =

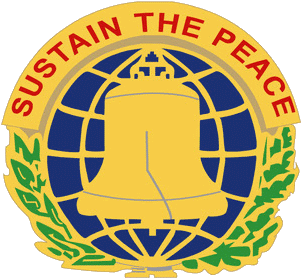
- 304th Civil Affairs Brigade's Distinctive Unit Insignia
- Active: 1952-present
- Country: United States
- Branch: United States Army Reserve
- Role: Civil Affairs
- Size: Brigade
- Garrison/HQ: Philadelphia, Penn.
- Motto: Sustain The Peace

Insignia
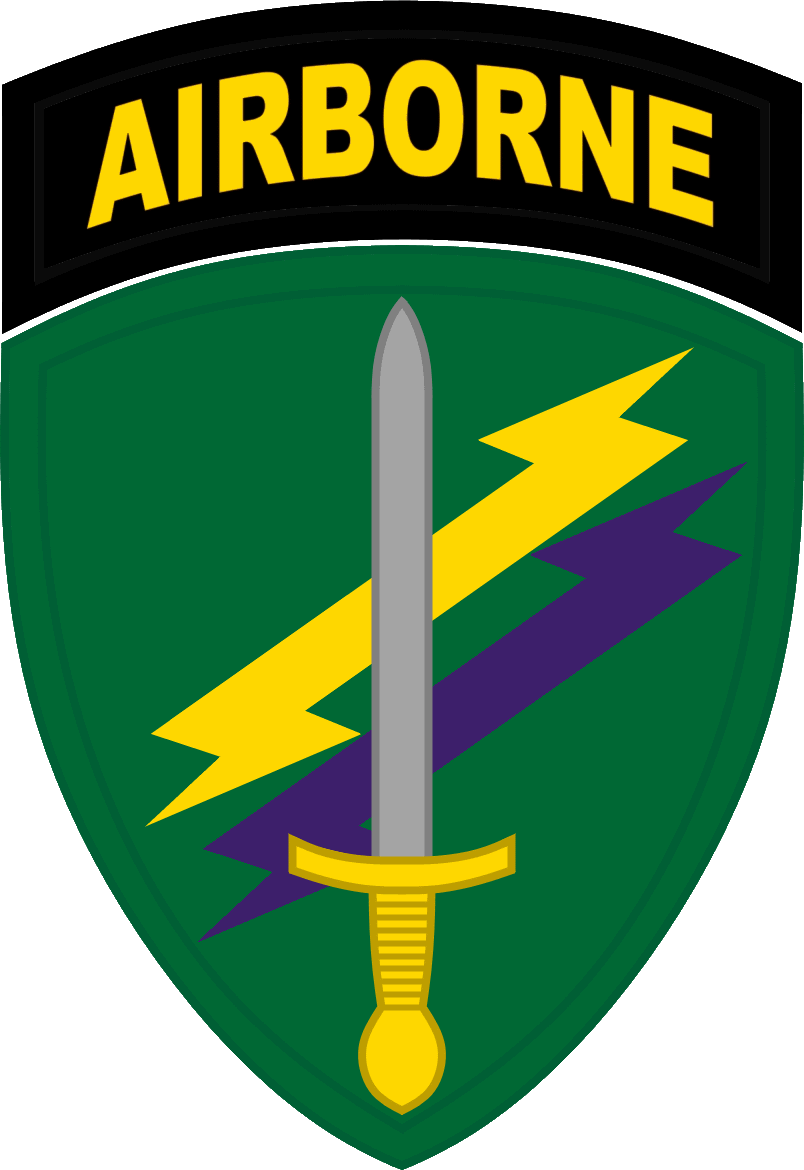
- USACAPOC Shoulder Sleeve Insignia worn by all subordinate units

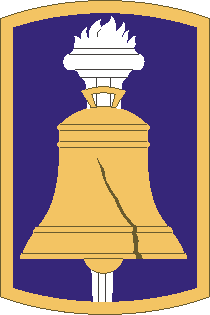
- Former Shoulder Sleeve Insignia of the 304th Civil Affairs Brigade

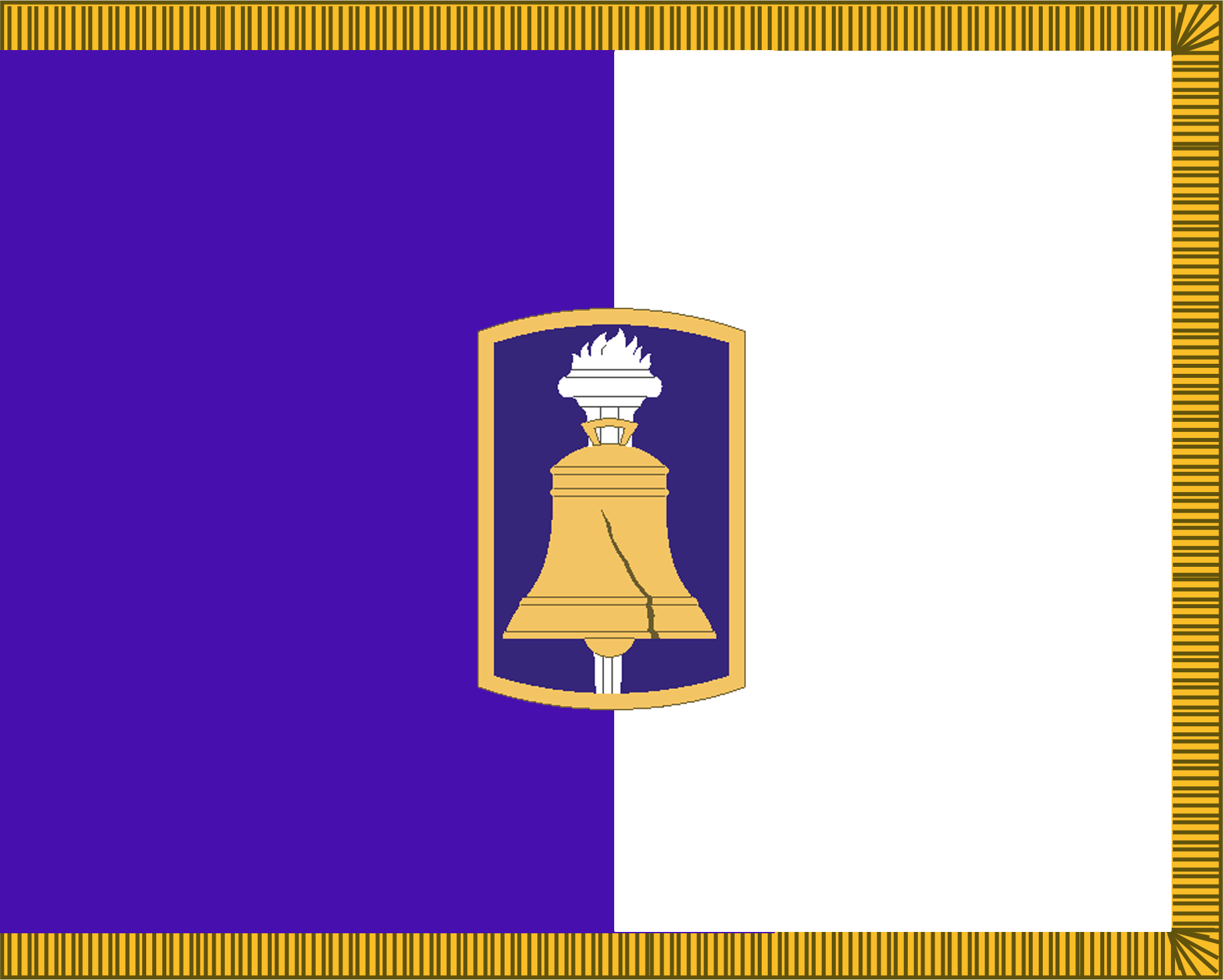
- 304th Civil Affairs Brigade Flag

The 304th Civil Affairs Brigade is a unit in the US Army Reserve. The unit was originally created in 1949 as the 304th Military Government Group in Philadelphia, Penn. In 1956 it was redesignated as the 304th Civil Affairs and Military Government Group. In 1990 the unit deployed to Saudi Arabia as part of Operation Desert Shield and Desert Storm, earning streamers for Liberation and Defense of Kuwait and Cease-Fire. In 1992, the unit was redesignated as the 304th Civil Affairs Brigade. In 2003 and again in 2007, the unit was entered into active service to support the Global War on Terror earning the brigade a Presidential Unit Citation (Navy) 2003 and two Meritorious Unit Commendations one in 2003 and one in 2007.

== Organization ==
The brigade is a subordinate unit of the 353rd Civil Affairs Command. As of January 2026 the brigade consists of the following units:

- 304th Civil Affairs Brigade, in Bristol (PA)
  - Headquarters and Headquarters Company, at Bristol (PA)
  - 403rd Civil Affairs Battalion, in Mattydale (NY)
    - Bravo Company, 403rd Civil Affairs Battalion, in Utica (NY)
  - 411th Civil Affairs Battalion, in Danbury (CT)
  - 443rd Civil Affairs Battalion, at Naval Station Newport (RI)
  - 486th Civil Affairs Battalion, in Tulsa (OK)

Each Civil Affairs Battalion consists of a Headquarters and Headquarters Company and four civil affairs companies.
