= Harry J. Mott III =

United States Army general (1929–2023)

Harry James Mott, III
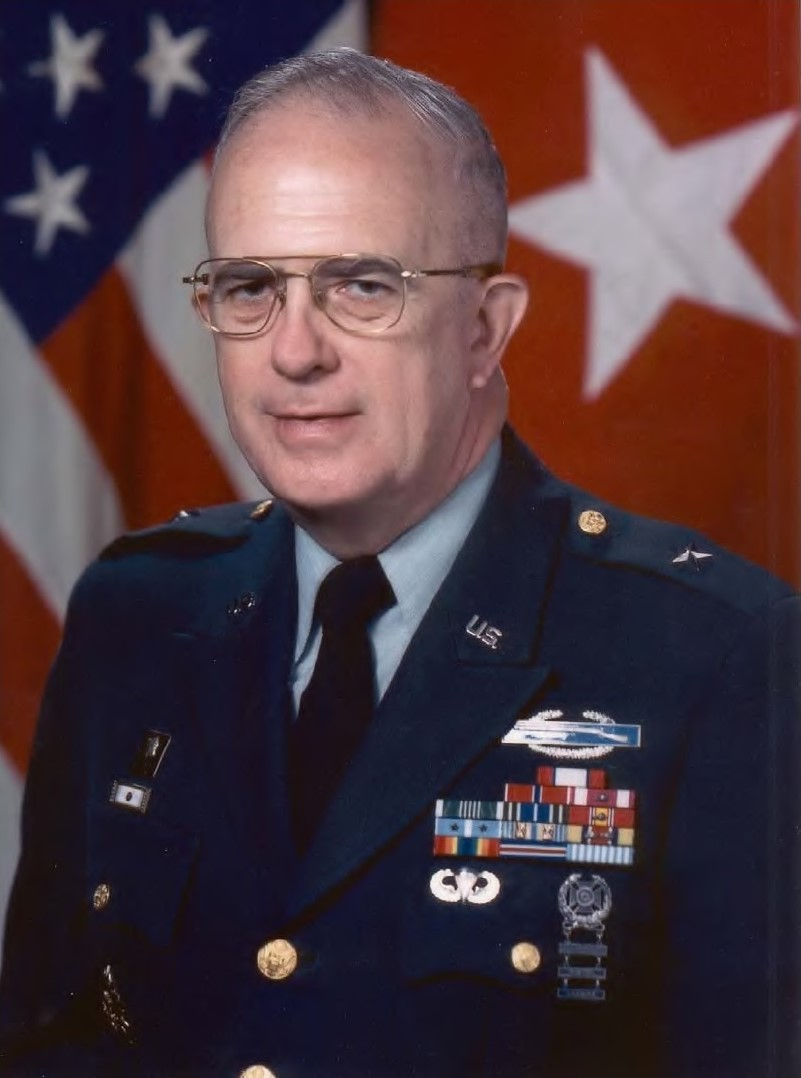
- Mott in 1987
- Born: May 5, 1929; Newark, New Jersey, United States
- Died: April 16, 2023 (aged 93)
- Burial place: Arlington National Cemetery
- Military career
- Allegiance: United States
- Branch: United States Army
- Rank: Brigadier General
- Commands: United States Army Reserve
- Conflicts: Korean War
- Awards: Distinguished Service Medal; Bronze Star Medal; Meritorious Service Medal (2)

Harry James Mott III (May 5, 1929 – April 16, 2023) was a brigadier general in the United States Army. He was acting chief of the United States Army Reserve, a position he held from August 1, 1986, to November 30, 1986. Mott also was Deputy Chief of the Army Reserve from March 13, 1983, to July 31, 1986, and from December 1, 1986, to August 5, 1987.

Mott was born in Newark, New Jersey, and raised in northern New Jersey and New York City. He joined the Naval Reserve in February 1947 and was appointed to the United States Naval Academy in June 1949. Mott left the Naval Academy in his second year after failing calculus and enlisted in the Army Reserve in June 1951. He graduated from Officer Candidate School at Fort Benning, Georgia in May 1952 and was commissioned as a second lieutenant of Infantry. Mott was deployed to Korea from March through December 1953. After returning to the United States, he completed a B.A. degree in economics at Adelphi University in 1956.

Mott died on April 16, 2023, and was buried at Arlington National Cemetery.
