= 351st Civil Affairs Command =

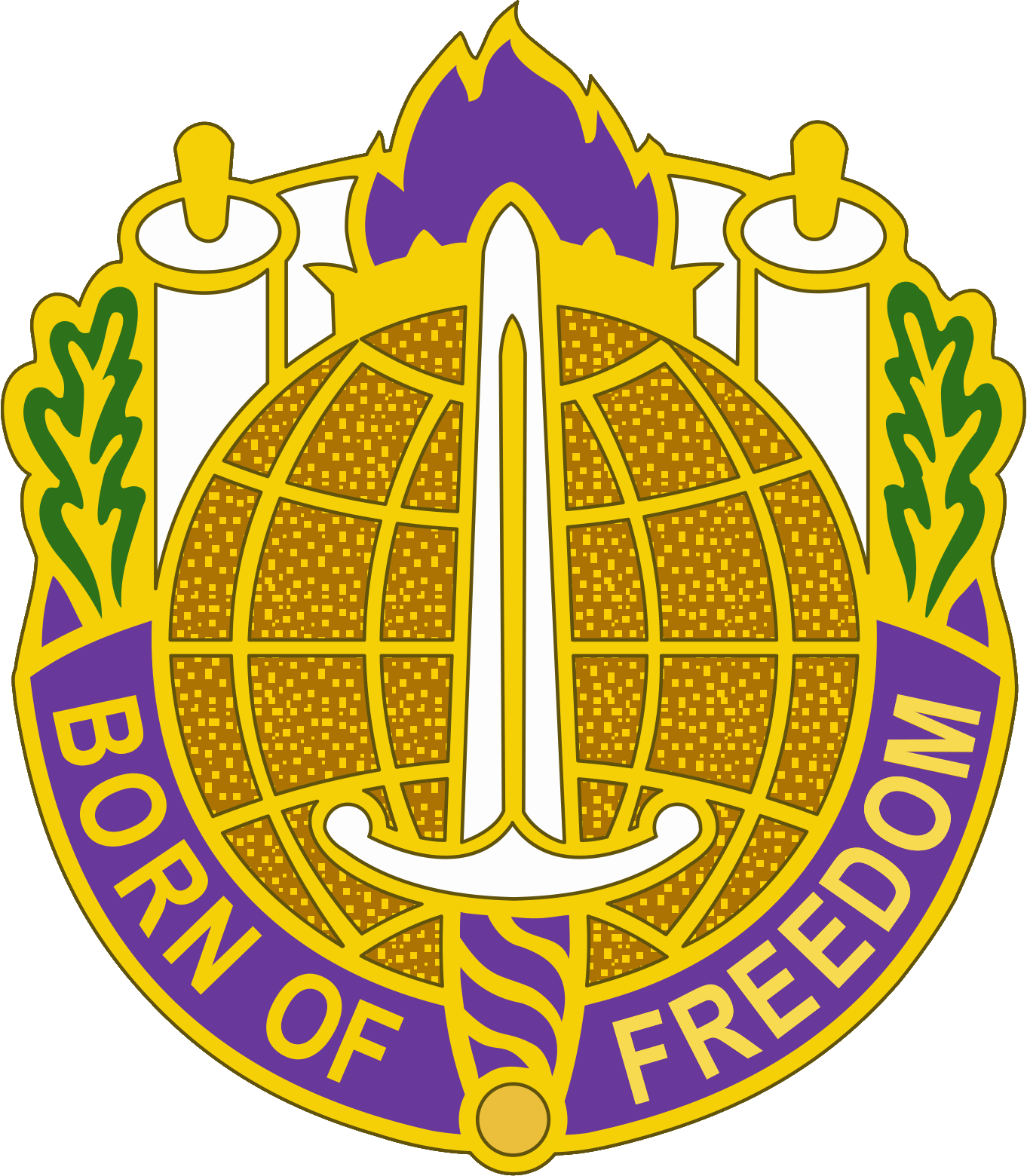
- 351st Civil Affairs Command Distinctive Unit Insignia
- Active: 1966-present
- Country: United States
- Branch: United States Army Reserve
- Role: Civil Affairs
- Size: Command
- Part of: U.S. Army Civil Affairs and Psychological Operations Command (USACAPOC)
- Garrison/HQ: Mountain View, California
- Motto: Born Of Freedom
- Website: https://www.usar.army.mil/USACAPOC/351stCACOM/

Commanders
- Current commander: COL Dan Keenaghan
- Command Sergeant Major: CSM Francisco Varela

Insignia
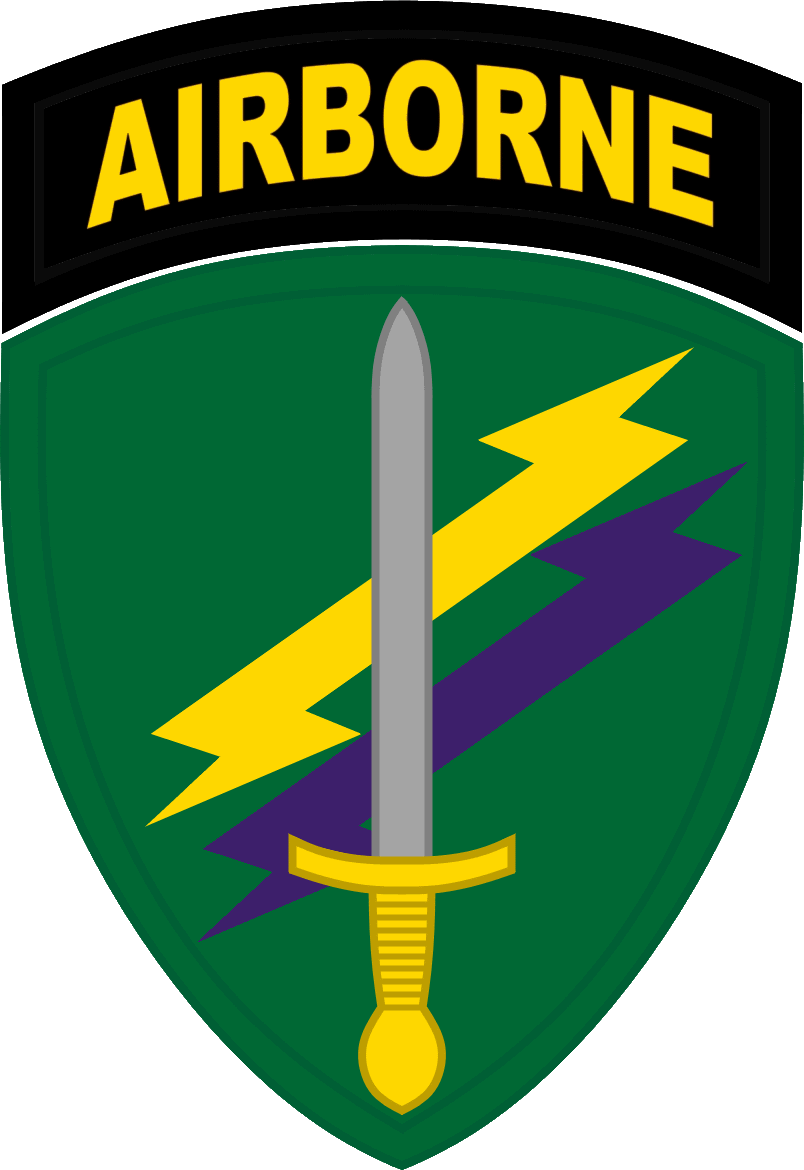
- USACAPOC Shoulder Sleeve Insignia, worn by the 351st Civil Affairs Command and all other subordinate USACAPOC units

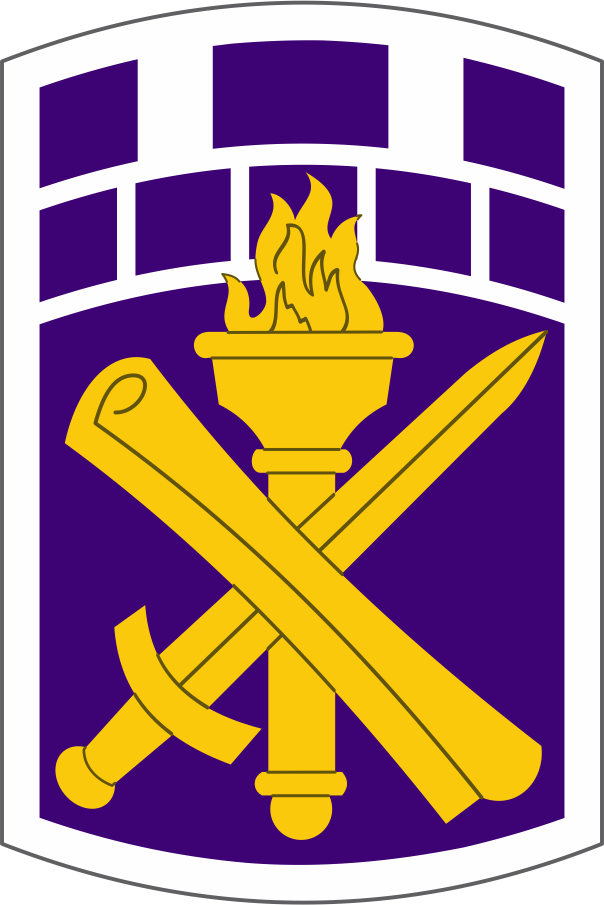
- Former shoulder sleeve insignia of the 351st Civil Affairs Command

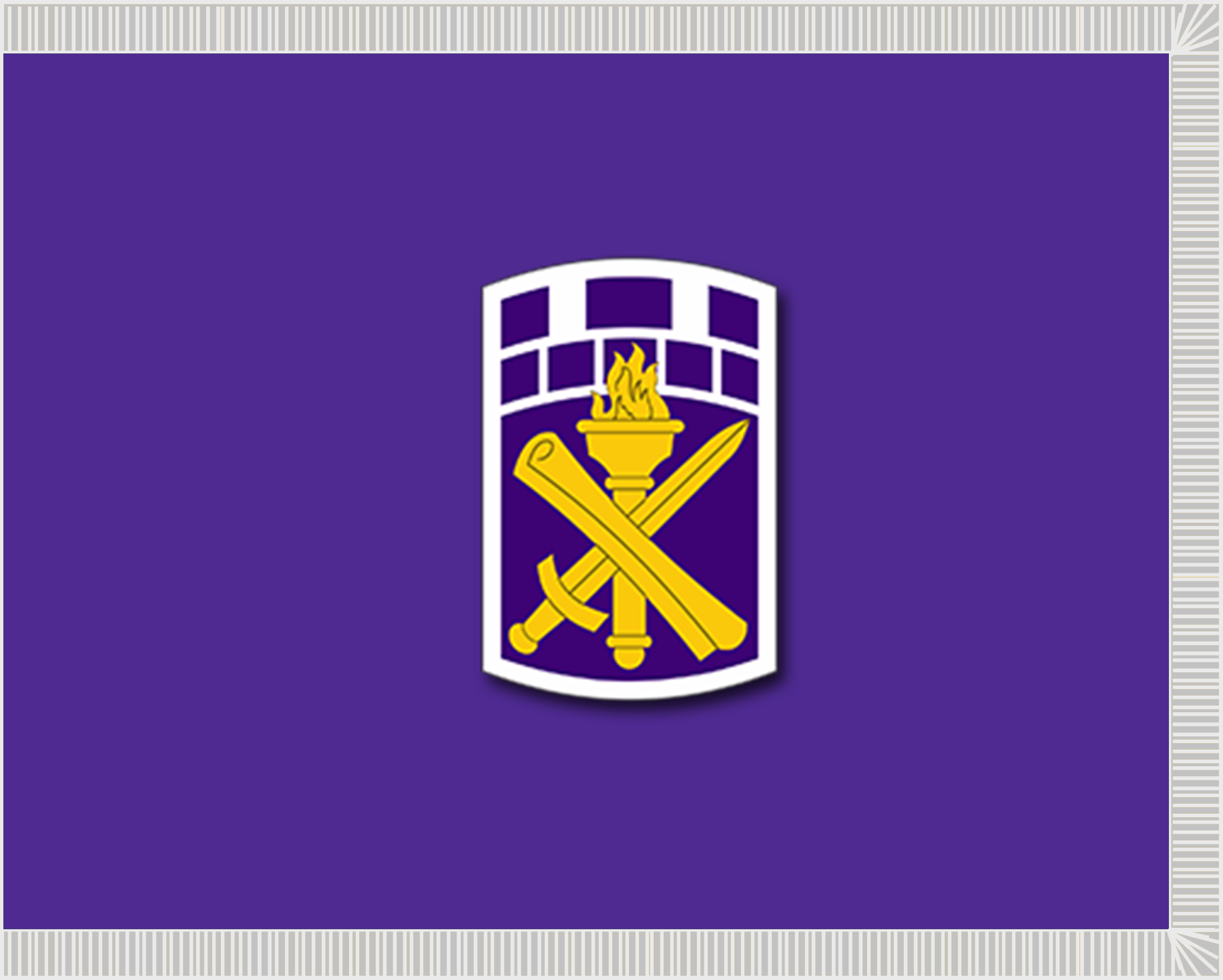
- 351st Civil Affairs Command Flag

The 351st Civil Affairs Command is a unit of the US Army Reserve since its creation in 1966 it has been headquartered in Mountain View, California. The unit was originally the 351st Civil Affairs Area until reorganized in 1975. The unit is subordinate to the Army Civil Affairs and Psychological Operations Command.

== Organization ==
The command is a subordinate unit of the Civil Affairs and Psychological Operations Command (Airborne). As of January 2026 the command consists of the following units:

- 351st Civil Affairs Command, in Mountain View (CA)
  - Headquarters and Headquarters Company, in Mountain View (CA)
  - 7th Psychological Operations Group (Airborne), at Moffett Federal Airfield (CA)
    - Headquarters and Headquarters Company, at Moffett Federal Airfield (CA)
    - 10th Psychological Operations Battalion (Tactical) (Airborne), at Jefferson Barracks Military Post (MO)
    - 12th Psychological Operations Battalion (Tactical) (Airborne), at Joint Base Lewis–McChord (WA)
    - 14th Psychological Operations Battalion (Tactical) (Airborne), in Mountain View (CA)
    - 17th Psychological Operations Battalion (Tactical) (Airborne), in Austin (TX)
  - 358th Civil Affairs Brigade, at March Air Reserve Base (CA)
    - Headquarters and Headquarters Company, at March Air Reserve Base (CA)
    - 416th Civil Affairs Battalion (Airborne), in Fallbrook (CA)
    - 425th Civil Affairs Battalion, in Encino (CA)
    - 426th Civil Affairs Battalion (Airborne), in Upland (CA)
    - 492nd Civil Affairs Battalion, in Buckeye (AZ)
  - 364th Civil Affairs Brigade, at Camp Withycombe (OR)
    - Headquarters and Headquarters Company, at Camp Withycombe (OR)
    - 405th Civil Affairs Battalion, at Fort Douglas (UT)
    - 440th Civil Affairs Battalion, at Fort Carson (CO)
    - 445th Civil Affairs Battalion, at Moffett Federal Airfield (CA)
    - 448th Civil Affairs Battalion, at Joint Base Lewis–McChord (WA)
