= 440th Civil Affairs Battalion =

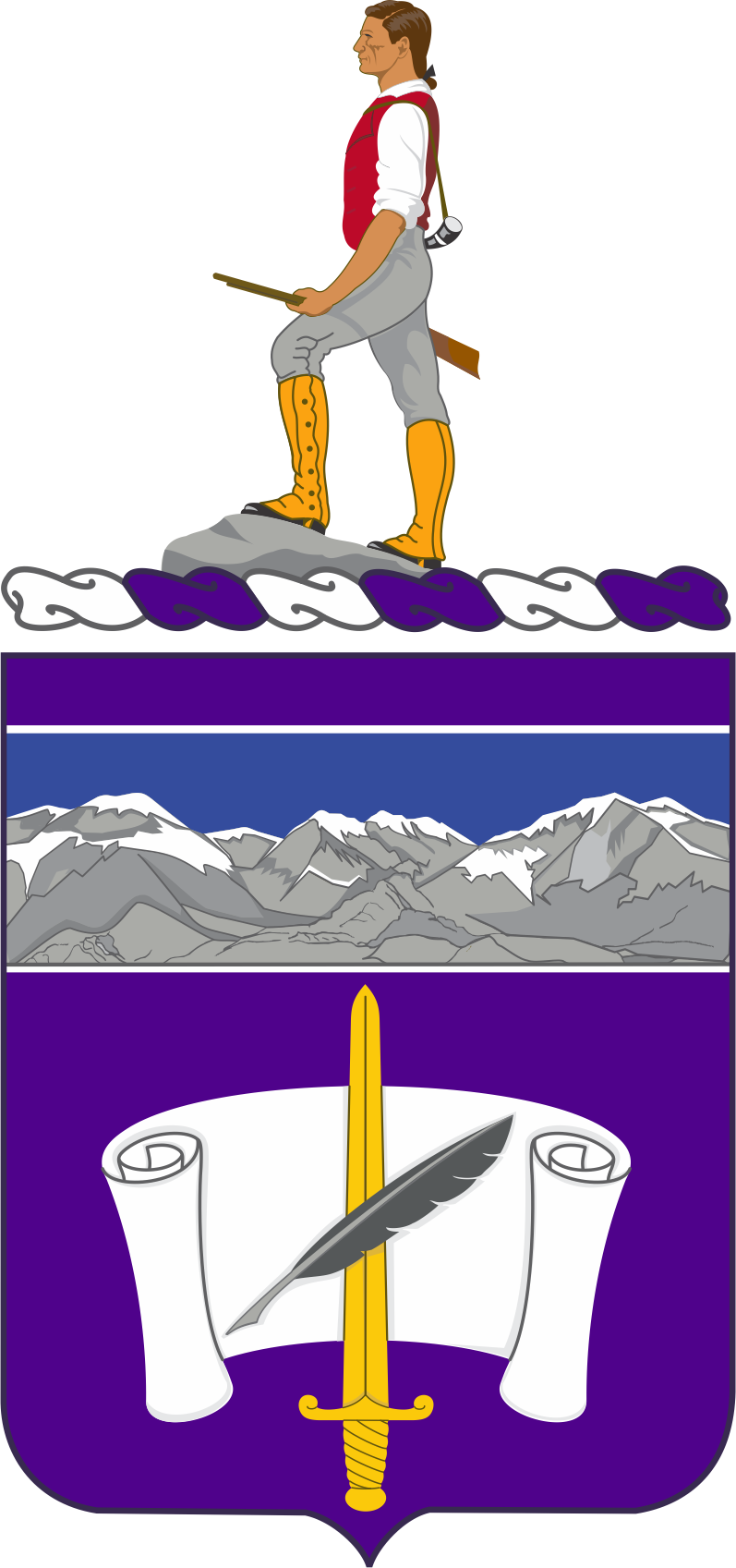
- Battalion coat of arms
- Active: 1950 – 1968; 2012 – present
- Country: United States
- Branch: United States Army
- Type: Reserve civil affairs
- Size: Battalion
- Part of: USACAPOC(A); 351st Civil Affairs Command; 364th Civil Affairs Brigade
- Garrison/HQ: Mark A. Evans Lawton US Army Reserve Center, Fort Carson, CO
- Mottos: "Aut viam inveniam aut faciam" ("I will either find a way or make one")

Commanders
- Current commander: Lieutenant Colonel; Justin P. Ramsey
- Command Sergeant Major: Command Sergeant Major; Cristobal G. Carreon

Insignia
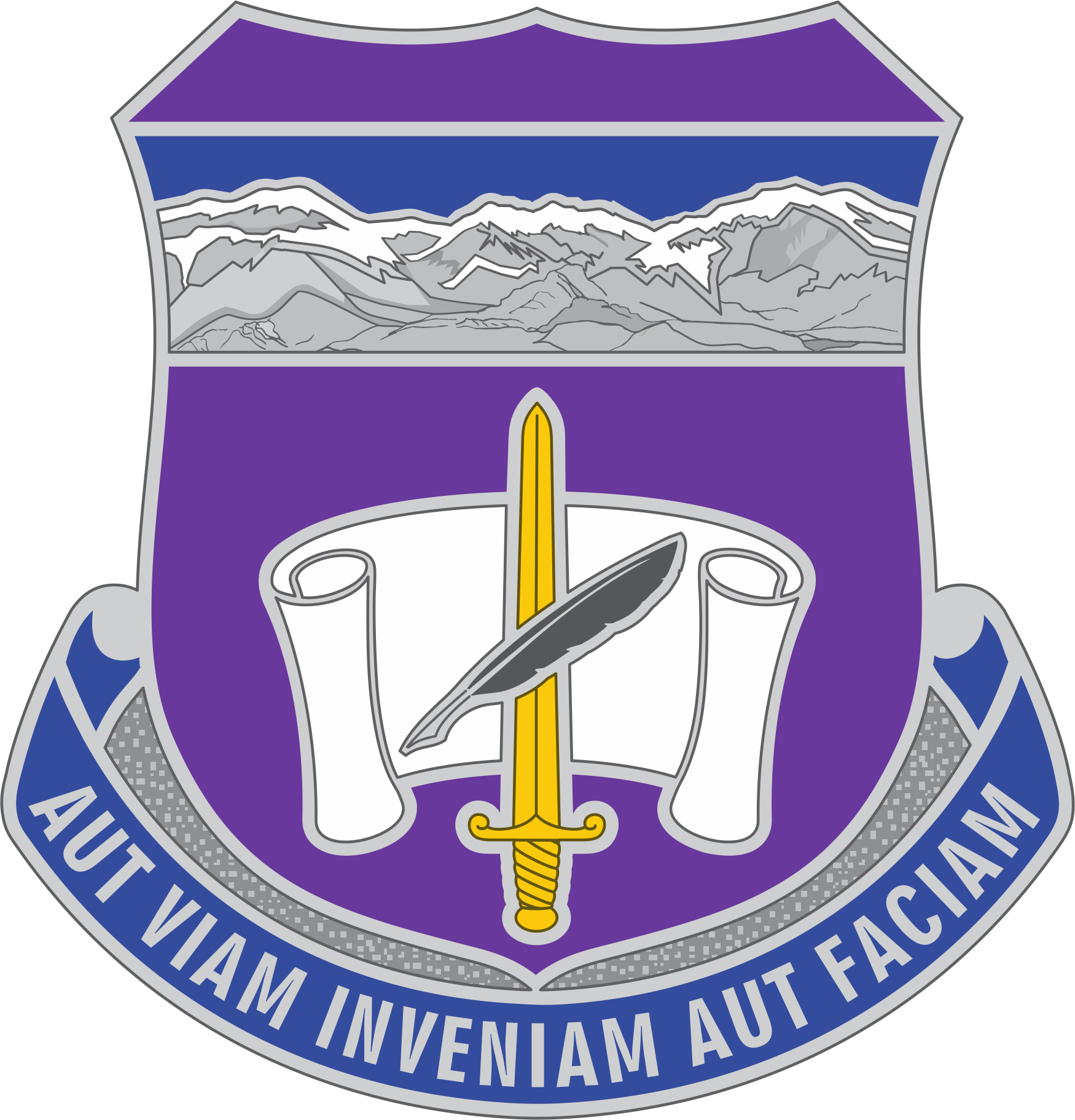
- Distinctive unit insignia

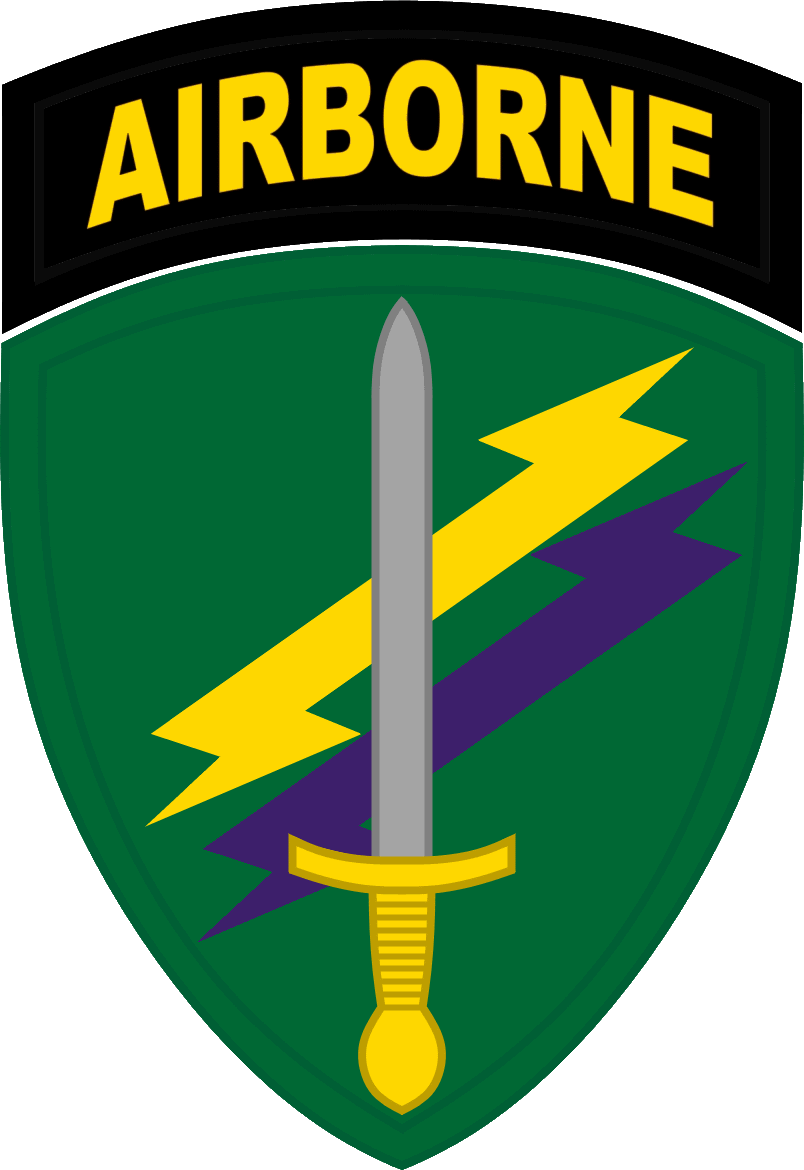
- Shoulder sleeve insignia

The 440th Civil Affairs Battalion is a civil affairs (CA) unit of the United States Army Reserve based in Fort Carson, Colorado and organized under the 364th Civil Affairs Brigade, 351st Civil Affairs Command, United States Army Civil Affairs and Psychological Operations Command (Airborne). It is a battalion-sized unit with approximately 200 Soldiers spread throughout a Headquarters and Headquarters Company (HHC) and four tactical companies labeled A through D. Activated on September 16, 2012, it is the newest civil affairs battalion in the United States Army.

== History ==
The 440th Civil Affairs Battalion traces its lineage to the 440th Military Government Company, a reserve unit initially activated in Wenatchee, Washington, on October 1, 1950. The unit remained in the United States during both the Korean War and Vietnam War until finally being inactivated at Wenatchee on February 29, 1968.

The modern 440th Civil Affairs Battalion was activated on September 16, 2012, at Fort Carson, Colorado. Regionally oriented to USINDOPACOM, the 440th is focused on Southeast Asia, Oceania, and the Western and Central Pacific areas. As a civil affairs unit the 440th trains extensively in the systems and cultures of these areas and regularly deploys small teams to locations such as Thailand, Malaysia and the Philippines, working with governments and the local populace of these areas on projects such as civil-military engagement, humanitarian assistance and foreign aid.

== See also ==
- United States Army Civil Affairs and Psychological Operations Command (Airborne)
- Civil affairs
- Civil-military co-operation
