= Inveniam viam =

Latin phrase meaning "I shall either find a way or make one"

"Aut inveniam viam aut faciam" (or "Aut viam inveniam aut faciam") is an Ancient Latin saying that means "I shall either find a way or make one". The first word "aut" may be omitted, corresponding to omitting the English word "either" from the translation.

The phrase has been spuriously attributed to Carthaginian General Hannibal, in response to his generals' statement that it was impossible to cross the Alps by elephant, during the Second Punic War in 218 BC. However there is no ancient source material for this statement.

The sentence appears in a tragedy by Seneca, spoken by Amphitryon about Hercules' return from the underworld to Megara. Seneca's Hercules Furens (Act II, Scene 1, line 276) has the whole sentence, in third person: "inveniet viam, aut faciet."

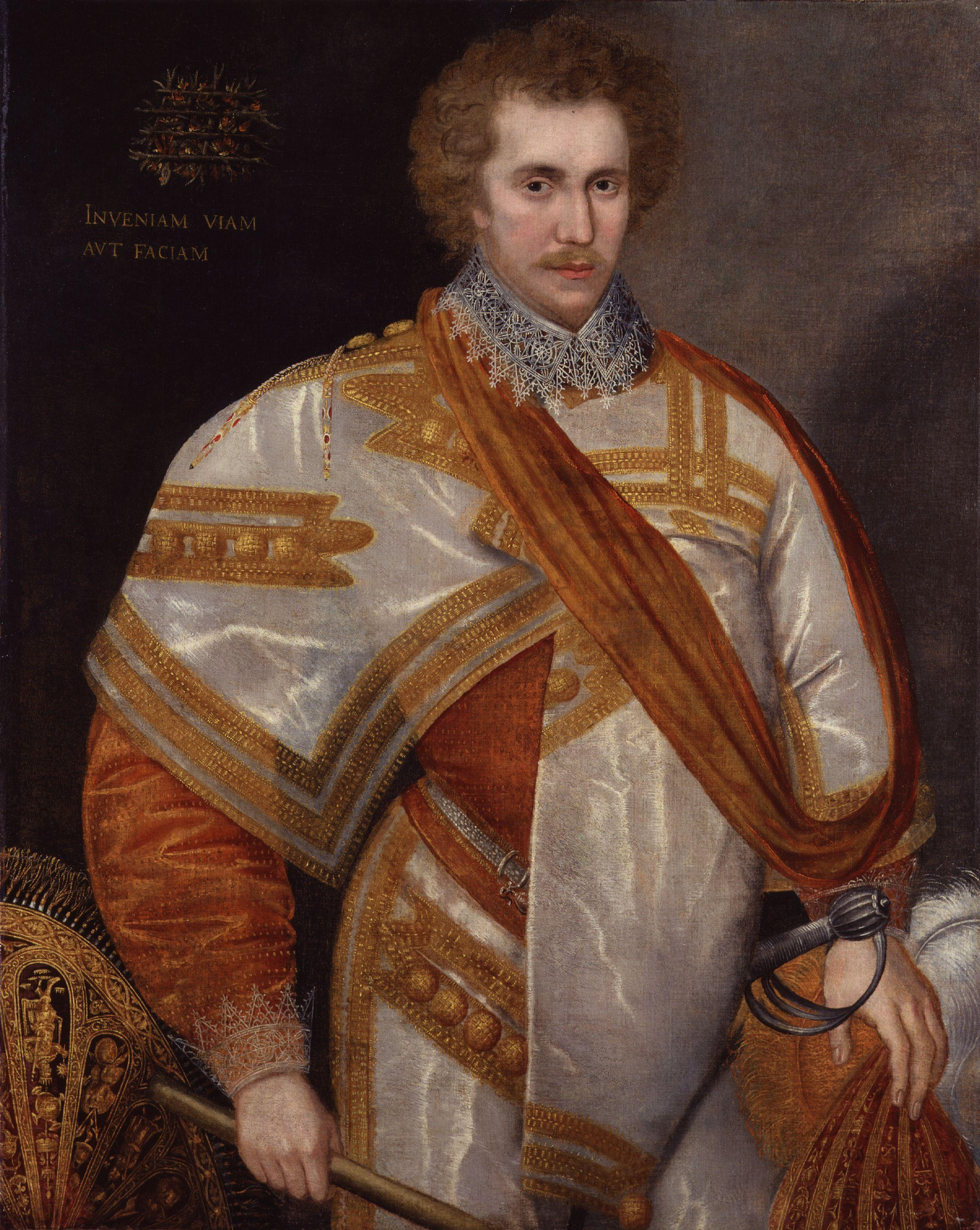
Portrait of Robert Sidney, c. 1588, with the motto Inveniam viam avt faciam

It has been used as a motto for instance by Francis Bacon as well as Robert Peary. It has remained popular in social, educational and military organizations.

In first person plural, the quote is written on an iron arch over the class of 1893 memorial gate at the University of Pennsylvania. A painting in the National Portrait Gallery, formerly attributed as Sir Philip Sidney and now thought to depict his brother Robert, is adorned with the phrase. In The Dunciad, Alexander Pope writes of John Henley that he "turned his rhetoric to buffoonry" by handing out medallions engraved with this motto.

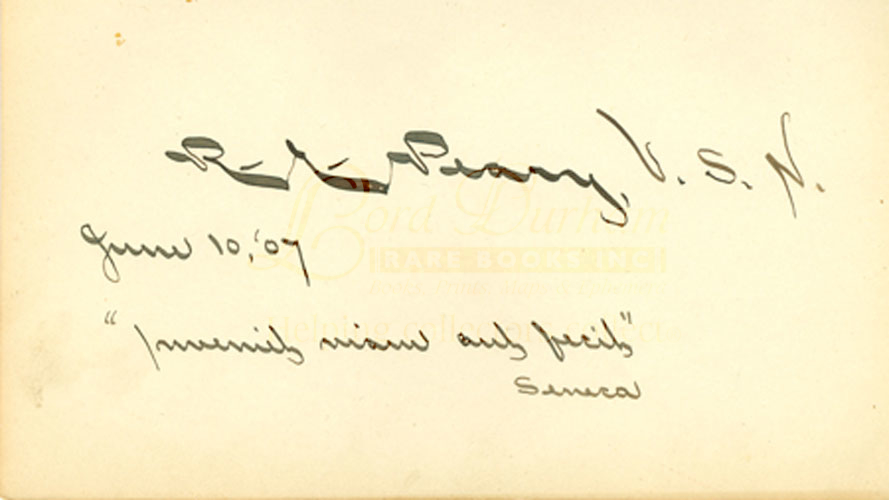
Robert Peary's signature 10 June 1907 with quote

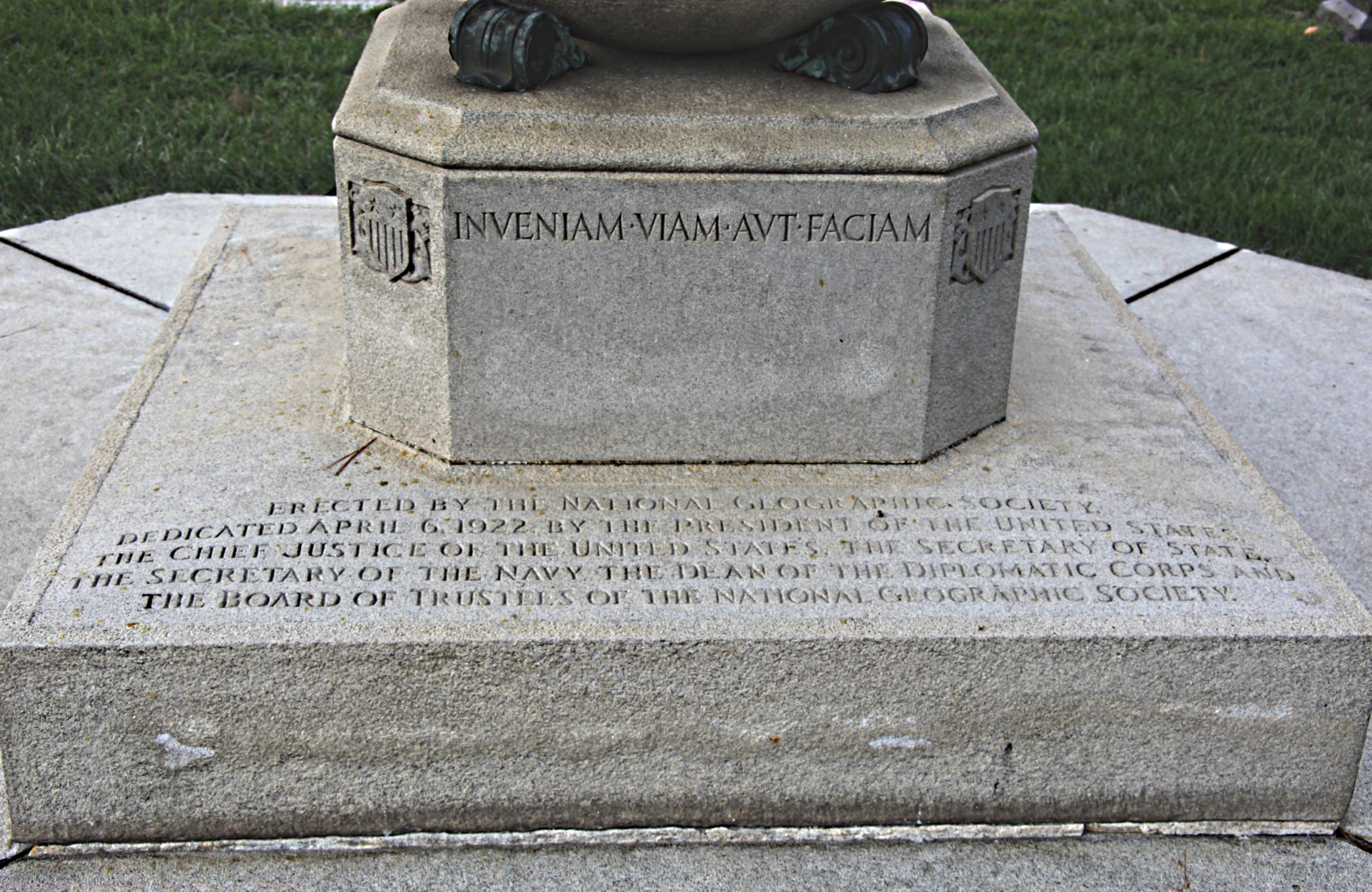
Peary's grave at Arlington National Cemetery

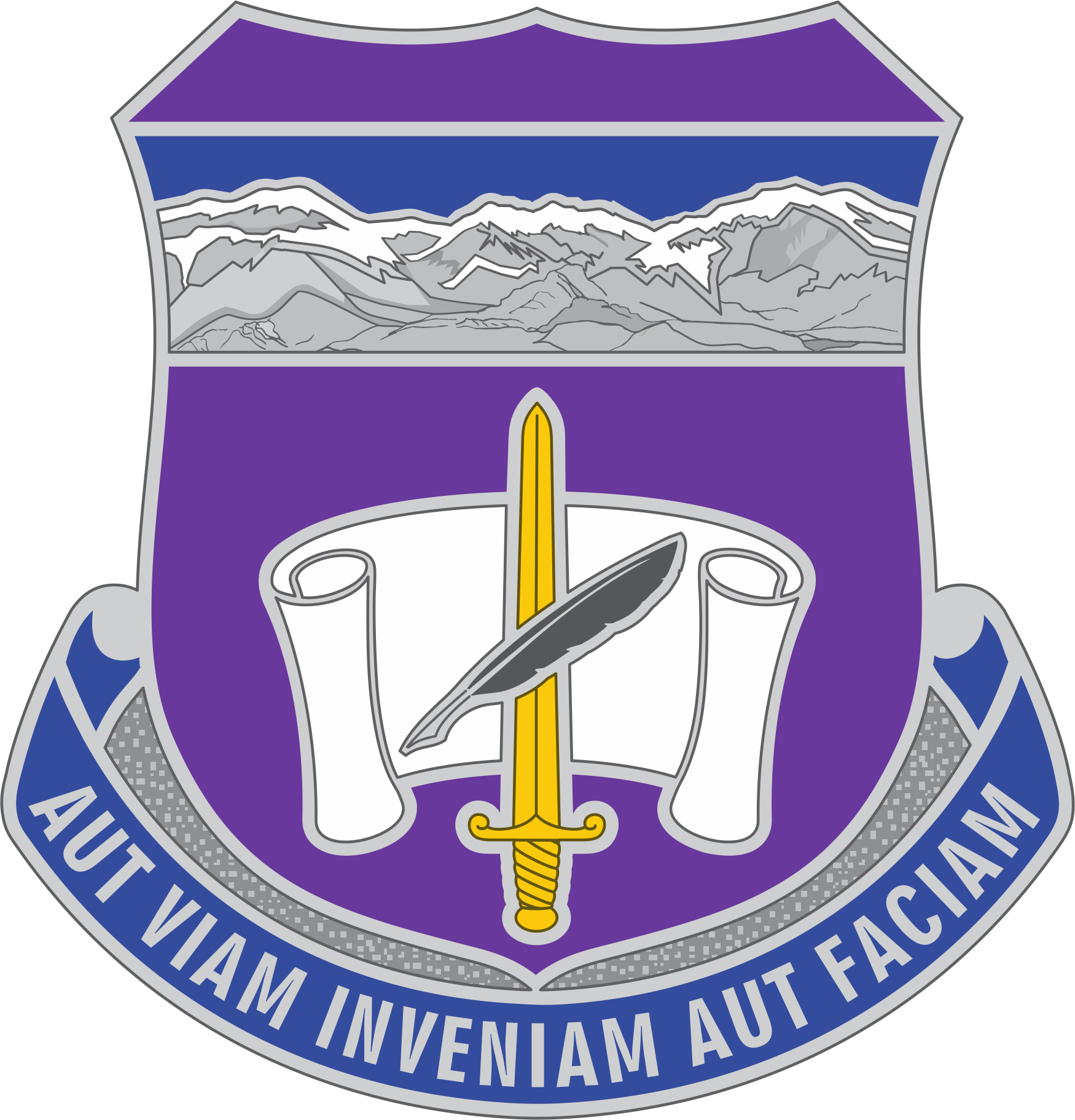
Emblem of the U.S. Army 440th Civil Affairs Battalion of Fort Carson, Colorado

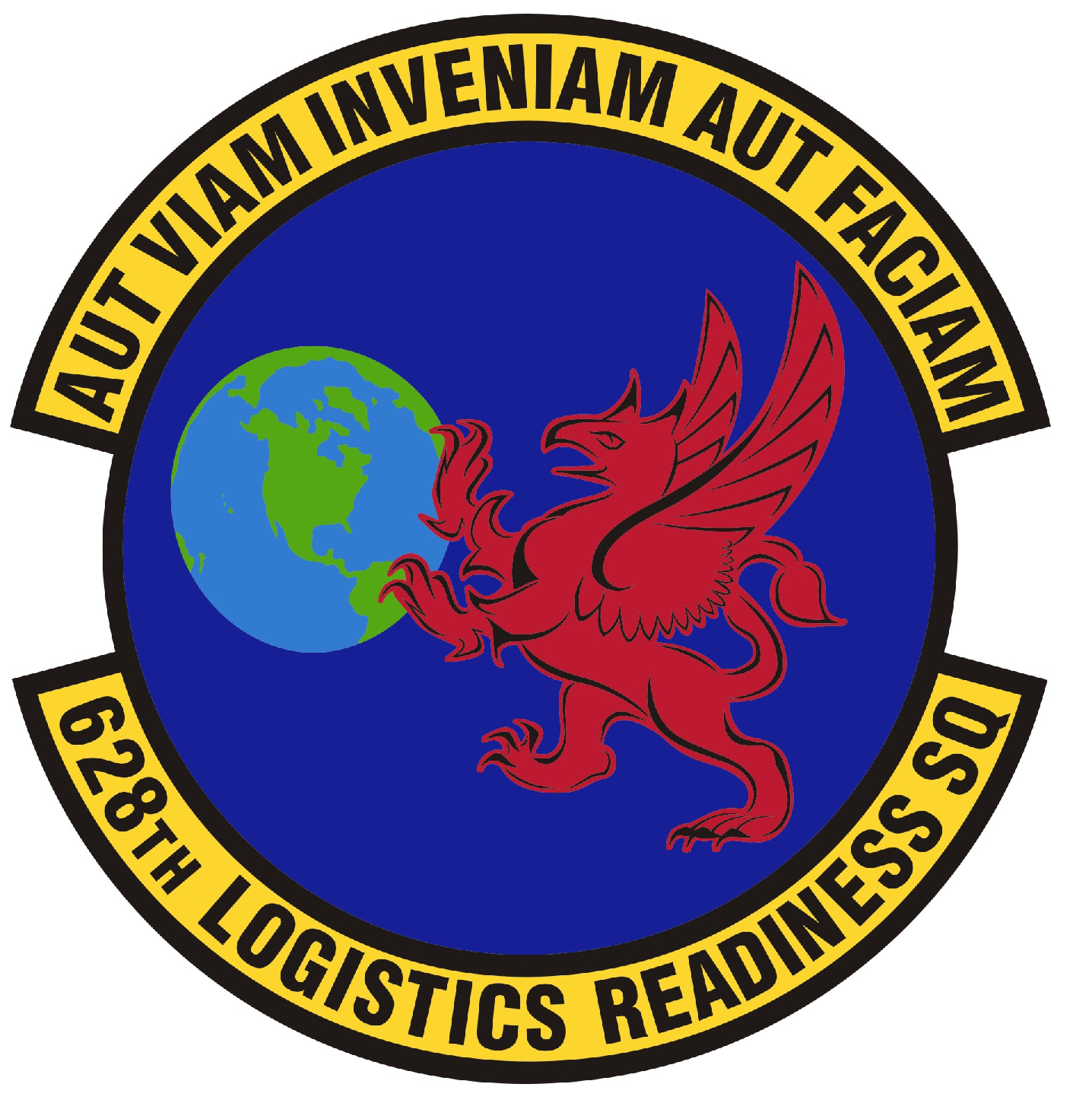
Emblem of the USAF 628th Logistics Readiness Squadron of Joint Base Charleston

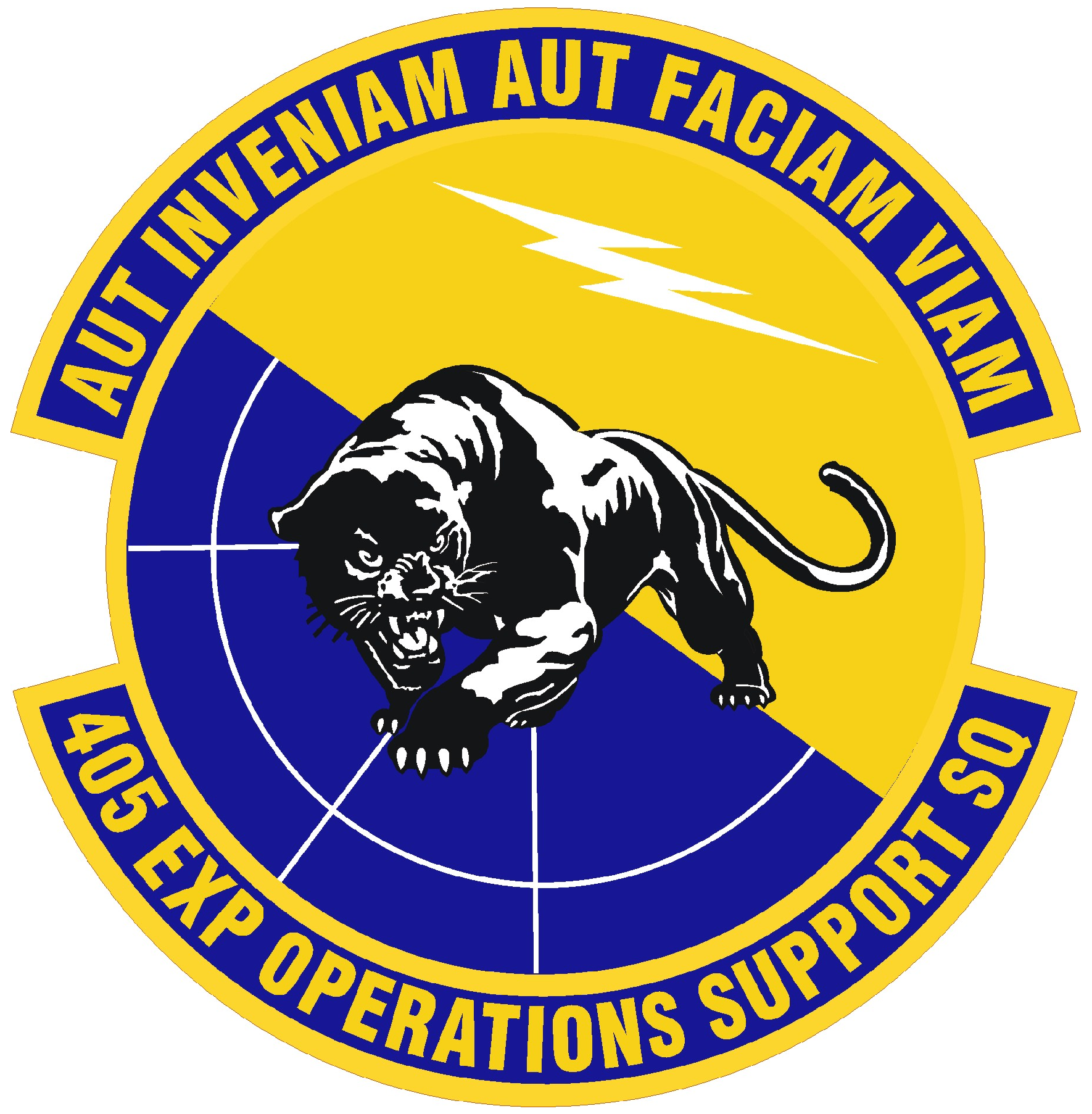
Emblem of the USAF 405th Expeditionary Operations Support Squadron (provisional)

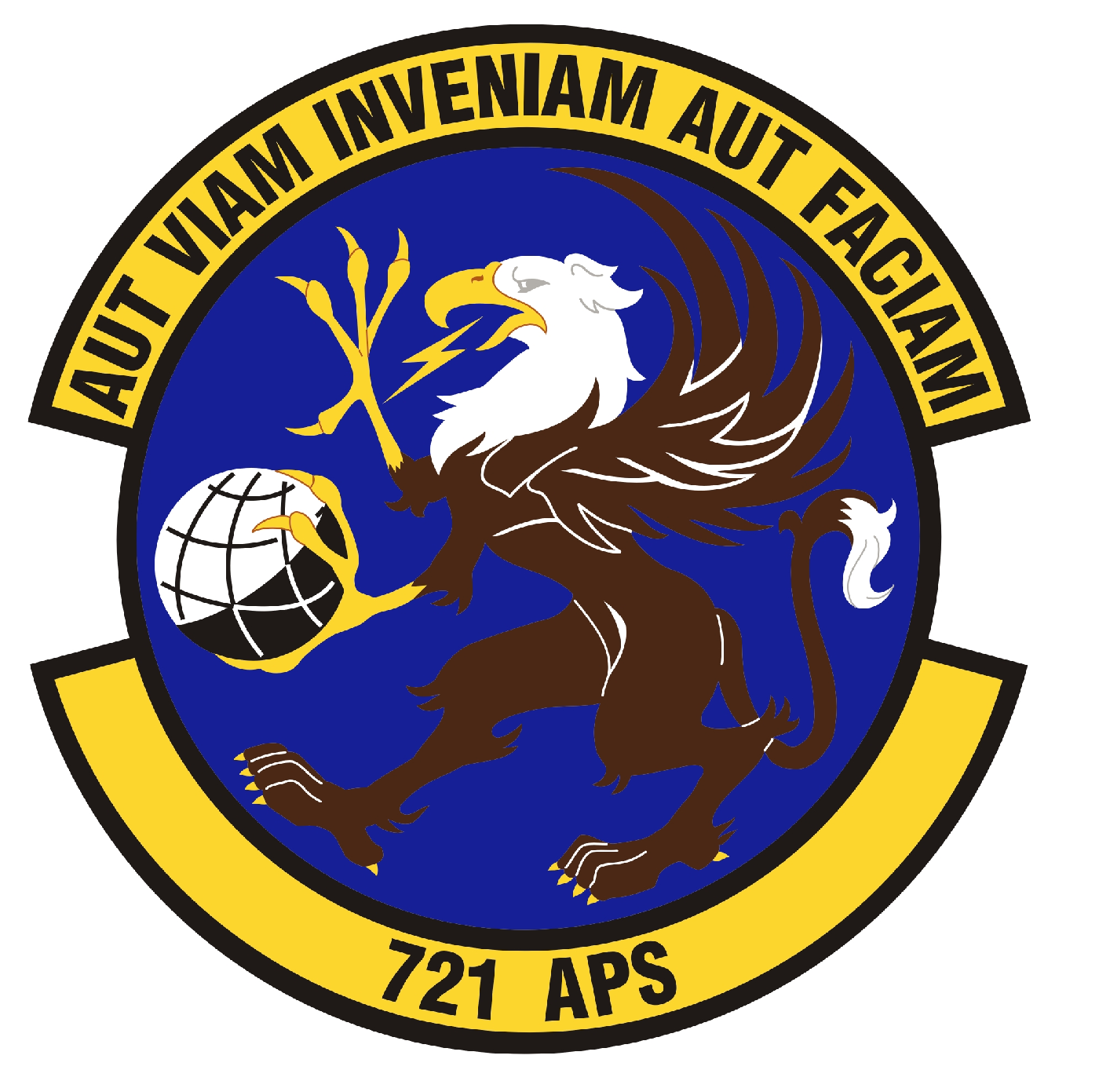
Emblem of the USAF 721st Aerial Port Squadron of Ramstein Air Base, Germany

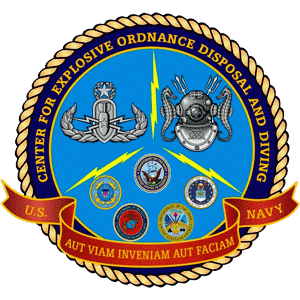
The U.S. Navy's Center for Explosive Ordnance Disposal & Diving logo
