= 358th Civil Affairs Brigade =

Civil Affairs brigade of the United States Army

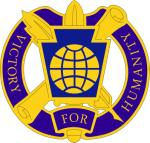
- 358th Civil Affairs Brigade Distinctive Unit Insignia
- Active: 1966—present
- Country: United States
- Branch: United States Army Reserve
- Role: Civll Affairs
- Size: Brigade
- Part of: 351st Civil Affairs Command of the U.S. Army Civil Affairs and Psychological Operations Command
- Garrison/HQ: Riverside, California

Insignia
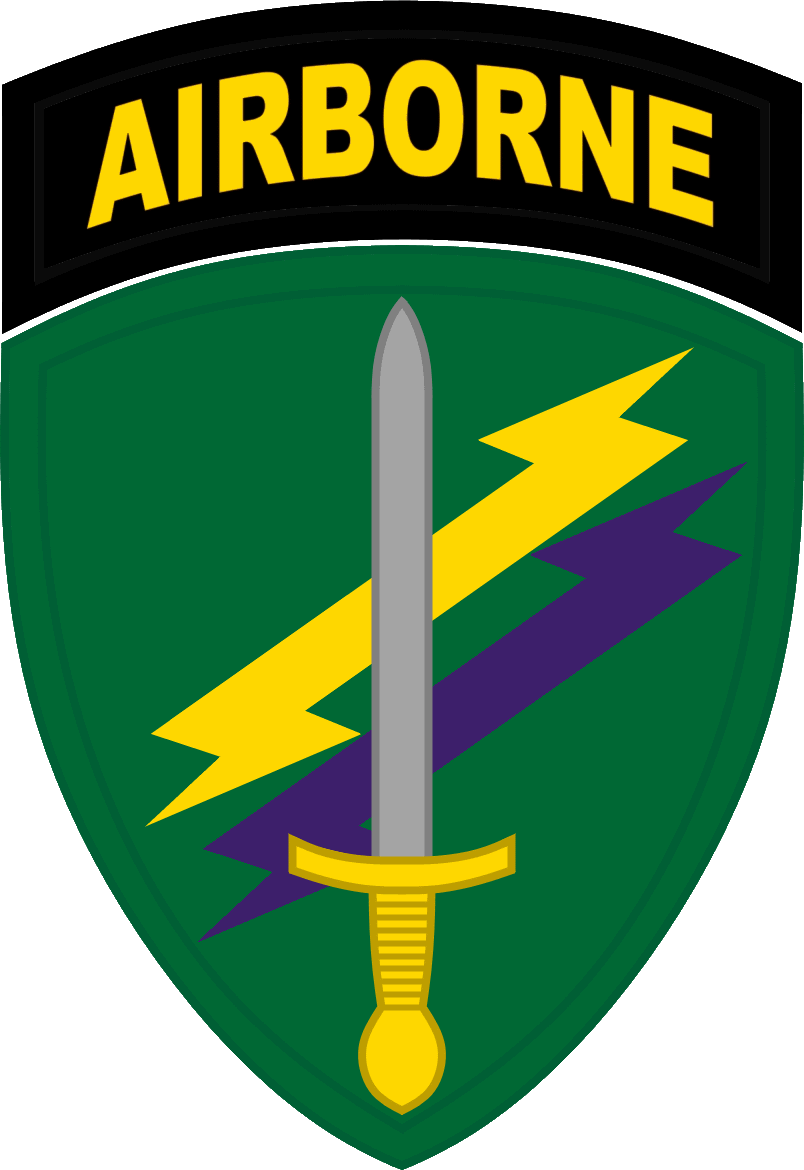
- USACAPOC Shoulder Sleeve Insignia, worn by the 358th Civil Affairs Brigade and all other subordinate USACAPOC units

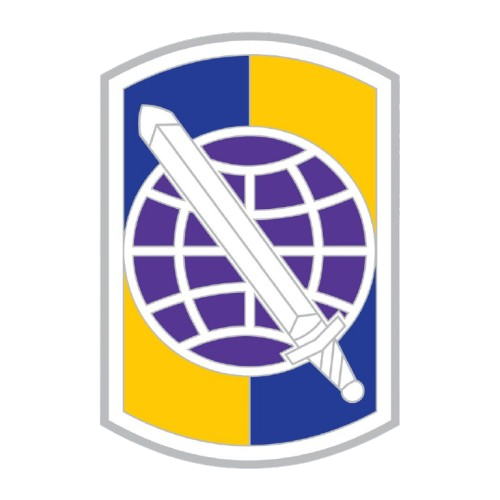
- Former shoulder sleeve insignia of the 358th Civil Affairs Brigade

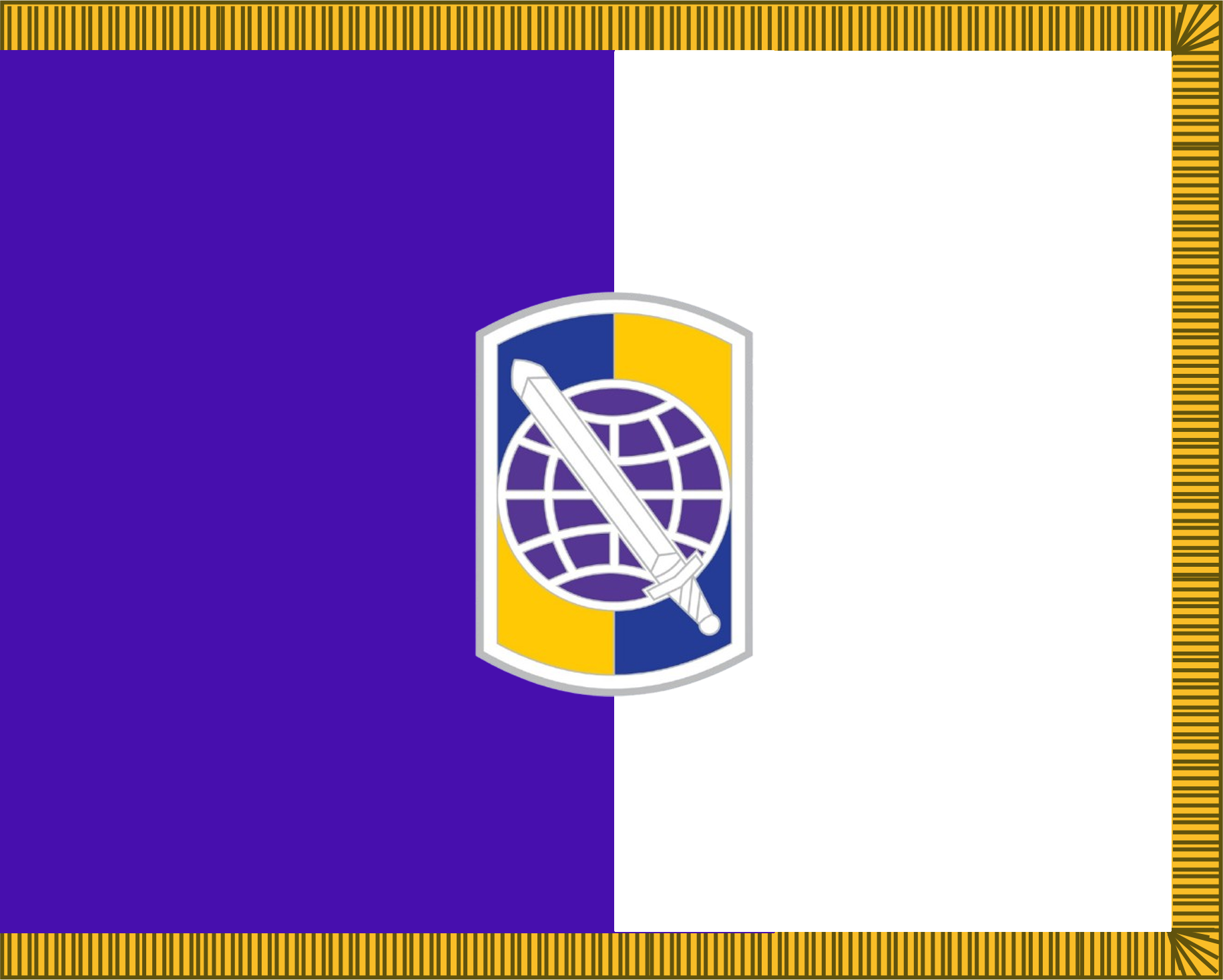
- 358th Civil Affairs Brigade Flag

The 358th Civil Affairs Brigade is a Civil Affairs brigade of the United States Army. The brigade was created on 31 January 1966 in the United States Army Reserve as Headquarters and Headquarters Company, 358th Civil Affairs Area, and activated at Norristown, Pennsylvania.

== History ==
The first deliberate Civil Affairs units in the U.S. Army were formed during World War II. Additional Civil Affairs units saw service in subsequent conflicts. Civil Affairs/Military Government was established as an Army Reserve Branch on 17 August 1955, The United States Army Reserve home to part-time soldiers who could bring different skills to the Regular Army not commonly found. Subsequently, re-designated as the Civil Affairs Branch on 2 October 1959, its members continued its mission to provide guidance to commanders on a broad spectrum of civil affairs activities.

HHC 358 CA Area was later reorganized and re-designated 1 June 1975 as Headquarters and Headquarters Company, 358th Civil Affairs Brigade (358 CA BDE).

The 358 CA BDE is part of the CA Regiment and works in conjunction with partner forces to achieve mission objectives.

During the United States invasion of Panama in 1989 ("Operation Just Cause") civil affairs forces, including the 358 CA Bde, conducted five tasks as part of the U.S. operation:

1. Support U.S. military efforts to establish law and order;
2. Provide CA support to the new Panamanian government;
3. Establish and run a refugee camp
4. Establish civil-military operations support;
5. Aid in conducting nation-building operations.

Civil affairs personnel cared for displaced persons, assisted the new Panamanian government, restored public services, and reestablished law and order.

The 358 CA BDE was ordered into active military service for deployment to the Iraq War on 16 February 2003 at Norristown, Pennsylvania; released from active military service 14 February 2005 and reverted to reserve status. It gained the Presidential Unit Citation (Navy), with streamer embroidered IRAQ 2003.

The 358 CA BDE was again ordered into active military service for deployment to the Iraq War 20 September 2006 at Norristown, Pennsylvania; released from active military service 17 March 2008 and reverted to reserve status. It gained the Meritorious Unit Commendation (Army), Streamer embroidered IRAQ 2006-2007.

The Brigade was relocated 30 April 2008 to Riverside, California, currently subordinate to 351 Civil Affairs Command (CACOM) in Mountain View California.

The demand for Civil Affairs forces led to the expansion of Civil Affairs in the Regular Army and Civil Affairs beings established as a basic branch of the Army effective 16 October 2006 by Department of the Army General Orders (AGO) No. 29, 12 January 2007.

351 CACOM, 358 CA BDE is aligned to support United States Indo-Pacific Command.

Despite the relocation to California the unit has maintained the Keystone on its DUI. In this small symbolic way the unit maintains its connections to its past back to the designation 358th Civil Affairs Area, at Norristown, Pennsylvania. One could likewise argue the fitting symbolism of the Keystone.

== Organization ==
The brigade is a subordinate unit of the 351st Civil Affairs Command. As of January 2026 the brigade consists of the following units:

- 358th Civil Affairs Brigade, at March Air Reserve Base (CA)
  - Headquarters and Headquarters Company, at March Air Reserve Base (CA)
  - 416th Civil Affairs Battalion (Airborne), in Fallbrook (CA)
  - 425th Civil Affairs Battalion, in Encino (CA)
  - 426th Civil Affairs Battalion (Airborne), in Upland (CA)
  - 492nd Civil Affairs Battalion, in Buckeye (AZ)

Each Civil Affairs Battalion consists of a Headquarters and Headquarters Company and four civil affairs companies.

== Campaign Participation Credit ==
- War on Terrorism: Global War on Terrorism (additional campaigns to be determined)

== Distinctive Unit Insignia ==
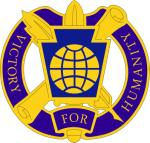
"Victory for Humanity"

=== Description/Blazon ===
A gold color metal and enamel device 1 1/8 inches (2.86 cm) in height consisting of a white background on which is a vertical gold sword blade up in front of a gold quill and rolled scroll in saltire, overall a blue keystone supported by the hand guard of the sword and bearing a gold globe gridlined blue; folded over the sword hilt passing beneath the quill, scroll and sword blade a tripartite purple scroll inscribed "VICTORY" on the dexter segment, "FOR" in base, and "HUMANITY" on the sinister segment all in gold letters.

=== Symbolism ===
Regale Purple and white are the colors used for Civil Affairs. The scroll and quill in saltire represent strength in civil authority and justice while the upright sword refers to the military responsibility to secure and protect peace. A keystone, symbol for Pennsylvania, the unit's original home state, reflects the state colors blue and gold, while the globe is indicative of the organization's mission and capabilities.

=== Background ===
The distinctive unit insignia was approved on 27 April 1977.

== Former Shoulder Sleeve Insignia ==
=== Description/Blazon ===
On an oblong shield 3 inches (7.62 cm) in height and 2 inches (5.08 cm) in width overall, arced at top and base and divided quarterly blue and yellow, a purple globe with white outline and grid lines, all surmounted diagonally throughout from lower right to upper left by a white sheathed sword, hilt to base; all within a 1/8 inch (.32 cm) white border.

=== Symbolism ===
Purple and white are the colors used for Civil Affairs. Blue and yellow are the colors of the State of Pennsylvania where the unit is presently located. The globe alludes to the scope of the organization capabilities. The sword represents military authority and is sheathed to symbolize support of post combat military operations.

=== Background ===
The shoulder sleeve insignia was approved on 9 June 1976. (TIOH Dwg. No. A-1-593)
