= 364th Civil Affairs Brigade =

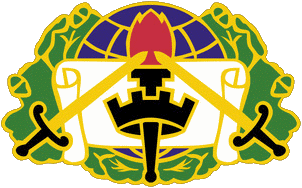
- 364th Civil Affairs Brigade Distinctive Unit Insignia
- Active: 1966-present
- Country: United States
- Branch: United States Army Reserve
- Role: Civll Affairs
- Size: Brigade
- Part of: 351st Civil Affairs Command of the U.S. Army Civil Affairs and Psychological Operations Command
- Garrison/HQ: Portland, Oregon
- Mottos: Be Bold, Be Brave, Be Ambitious
- Website: https://www.facebook.com/SecureTheVictory/

Commanders
- Current commander: Colonel Darrell Tran
- Command Sergeant Major: CSM Don Samuelson

Insignia
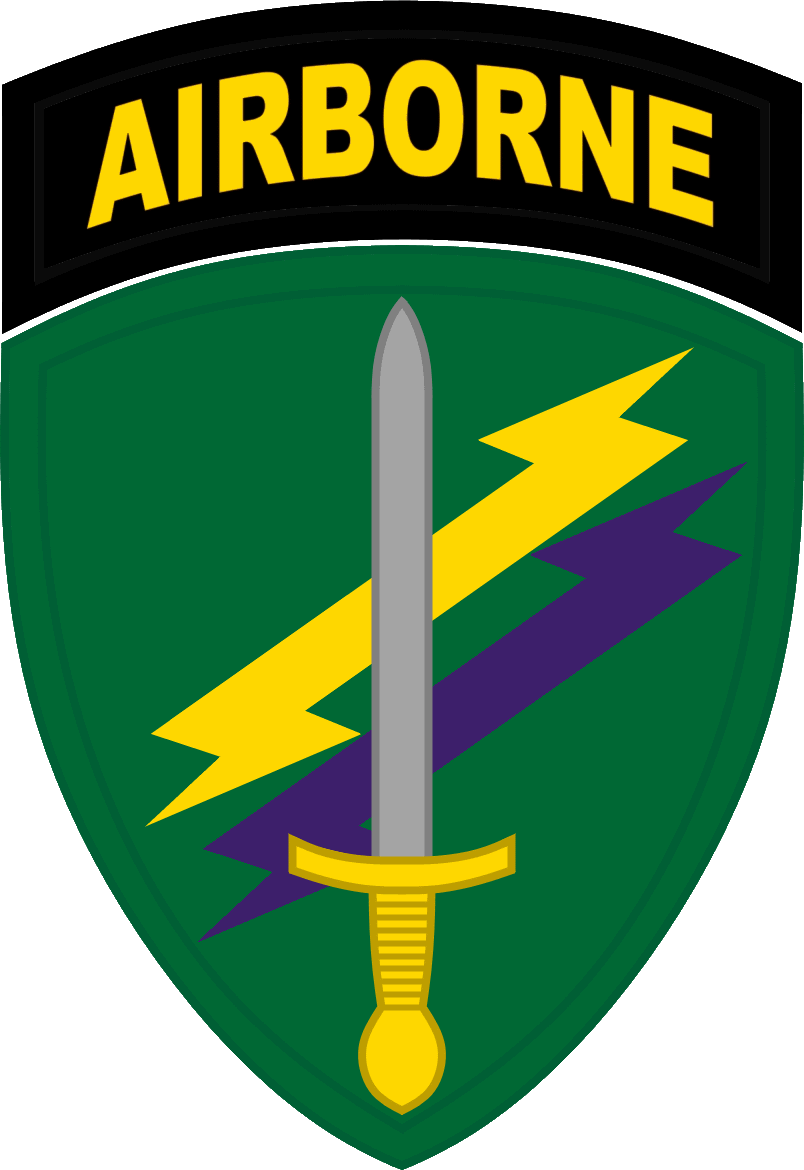
- USACAPOC Shoulder Sleeve Insignia, worn by the 364th Civil Affairs Brigade and all other subordinate USACAPOC units

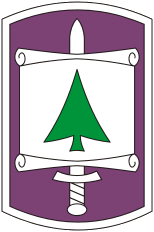
- Former shoulder sleeve insignia of the 364th Civil Affairs Brigade

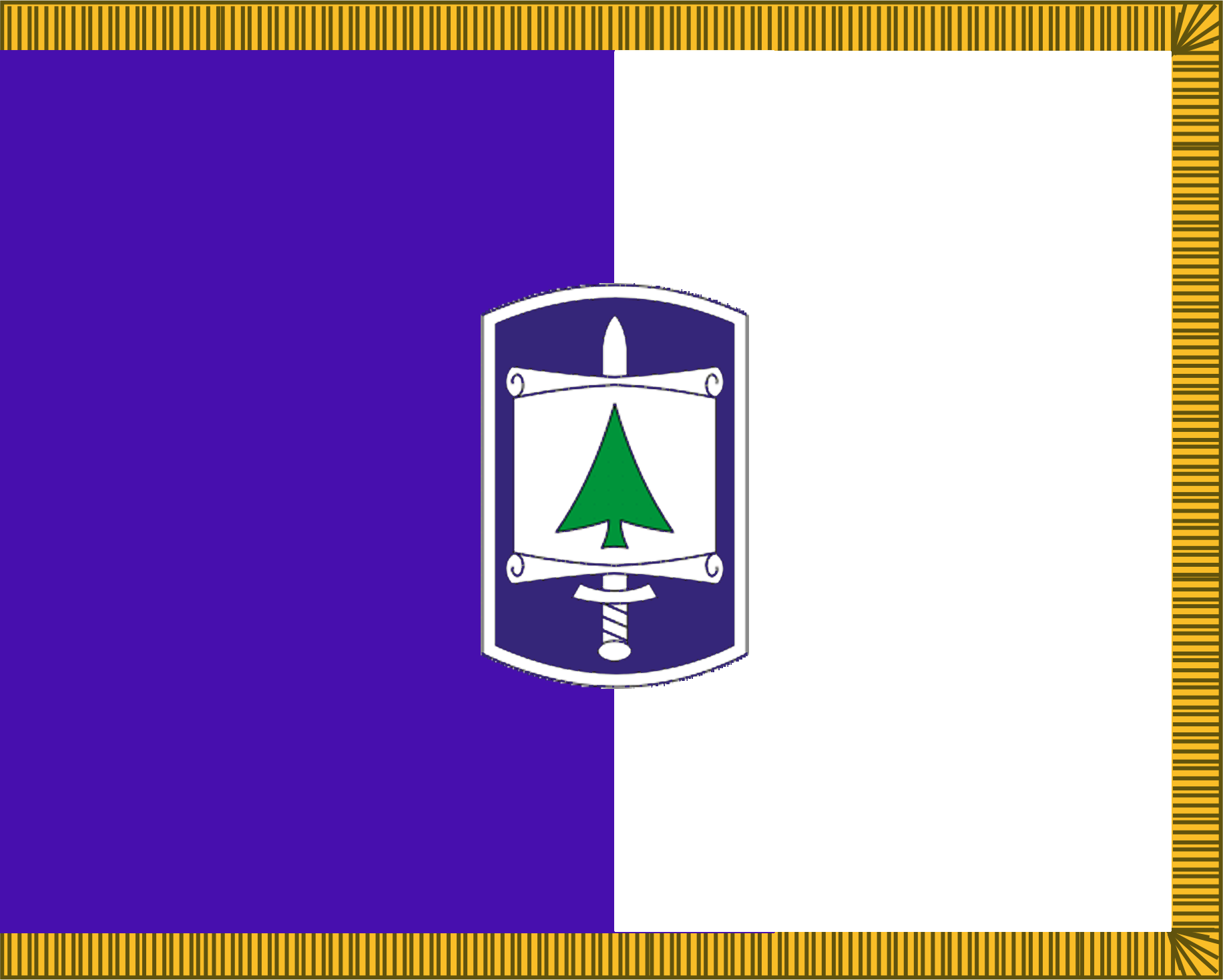
- 364th Civil Affairs Brigade Flag

The 364th Civil Affairs Brigade is a unit of the US Army Reserve since 1966. The unit was first created in 1966 as HHC, 364th Civil Affairs Area and was assigned to Sixth Army in Portland, Oregon. In 1975, the unit was redesignated as the 364th Civil Affairs Brigade. The brigade has deployed several times since the 1990s, in (Saudi Arabia) the first Gulf War, Bangladesh (Operation Sea Angel), Haiti (Operation Maintain Democracy), Bosnia (Task Force Eagle) and Afghanistan (Operation Enduring Freedom).

== Organization ==
The brigade is a subordinate unit of the 351st Civil Affairs Command. As of January 2026 the brigade consists of the following units:

- 364th Civil Affairs Brigade, at Camp Withycombe (OR)
  - Headquarters and Headquarters Company, at Camp Withycombe (OR)
  - 405th Civil Affairs Battalion, at Fort Douglas (UT)
    - Charlie Company, 405th Civil Affairs Battalion, in Las Vegas (NV)
  - 440th Civil Affairs Battalion, at Fort Carson (CO)
  - 445th Civil Affairs Battalion, at Moffett Federal Airfield (CA)
  - 448th Civil Affairs Battalion, at Joint Base Lewis–McChord (WA)
    - Delta Company, 448th Civil Affairs Battalion, at Camp Withycombe (OR)

Each Civil Affairs Battalion consists of a Headquarters and Headquarters Company and four civil affairs companies.
