= 528th Support Battalion (United States) =

528th Support Troops Battalion
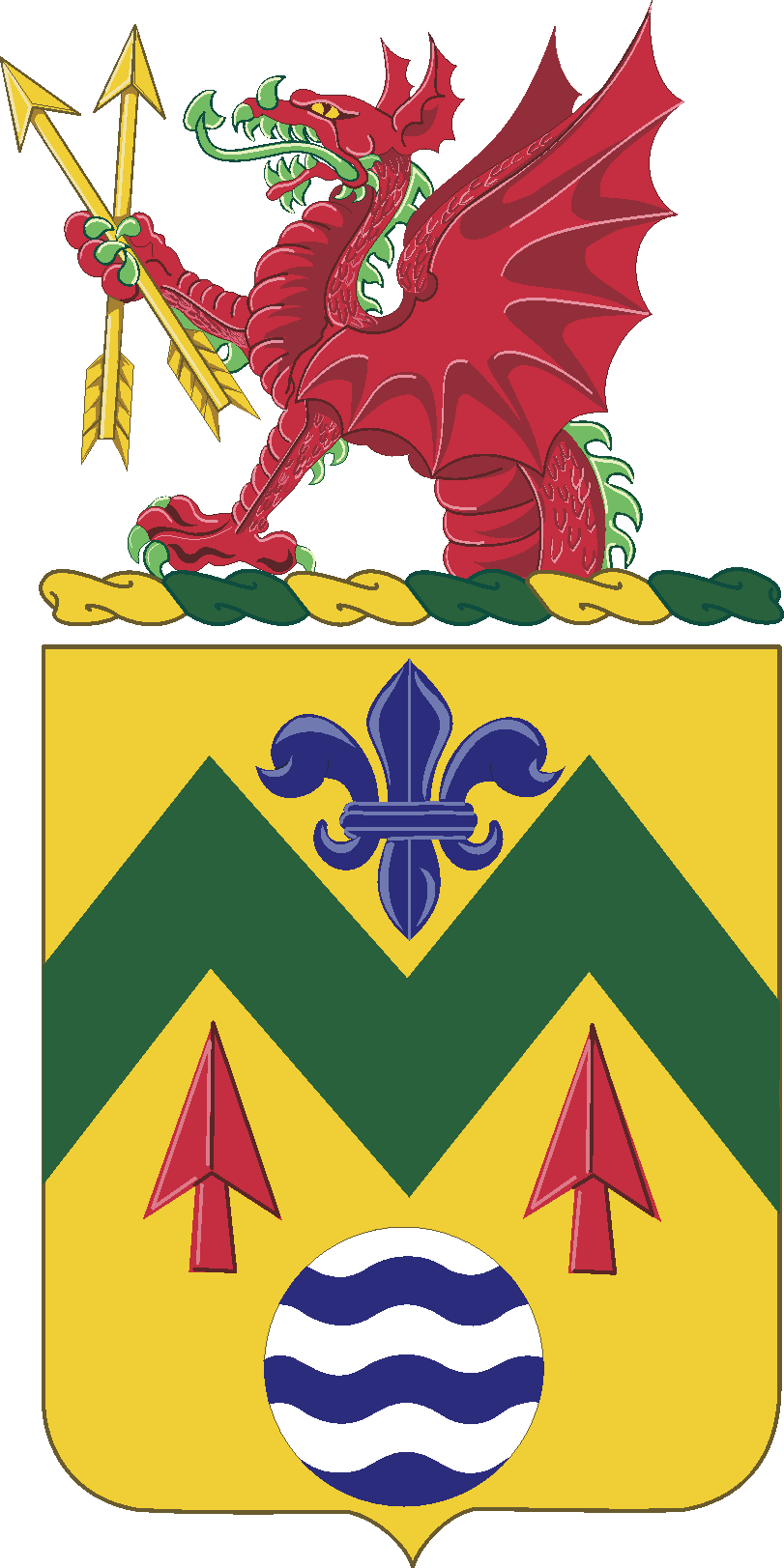
- Coat of arms
- Active: 1942-1947, 1948-1950, 1952-1966, 1969-1971, 1987-2005 inactivated 2 December 2005
- Country: United States of America
- Branch: United States Army
- Type: Special Operations Airborne Support Battalion
- Role: Special Operations Support
- Size: Battalion
- Part of: United States Army Special Operations Command
- Garrison/HQ: Fort Bragg
- Nickname: Black Daggers
- Engagements: World War II Sicily(Arrowhead) Rome-Arno Southern France(Arrowhead) Rhineland Ardennes-Alsace Central Europe Vietnam Summer-Fall 1969 Winter-Spring 1970 Sanctuary Counteroffensive Counteroffensive, Phase VII Southwest Asia Defense of Saudi Arabia Liberation and Defense of Kuwait
- Decorations: Valorous Unit Award Streamer embroidered IRAQ-KUWAIT 1991; Meritorious Unit Commendation (Army), Streamer Embroidered CENTRAL ASIA, 2001–2004

Insignia
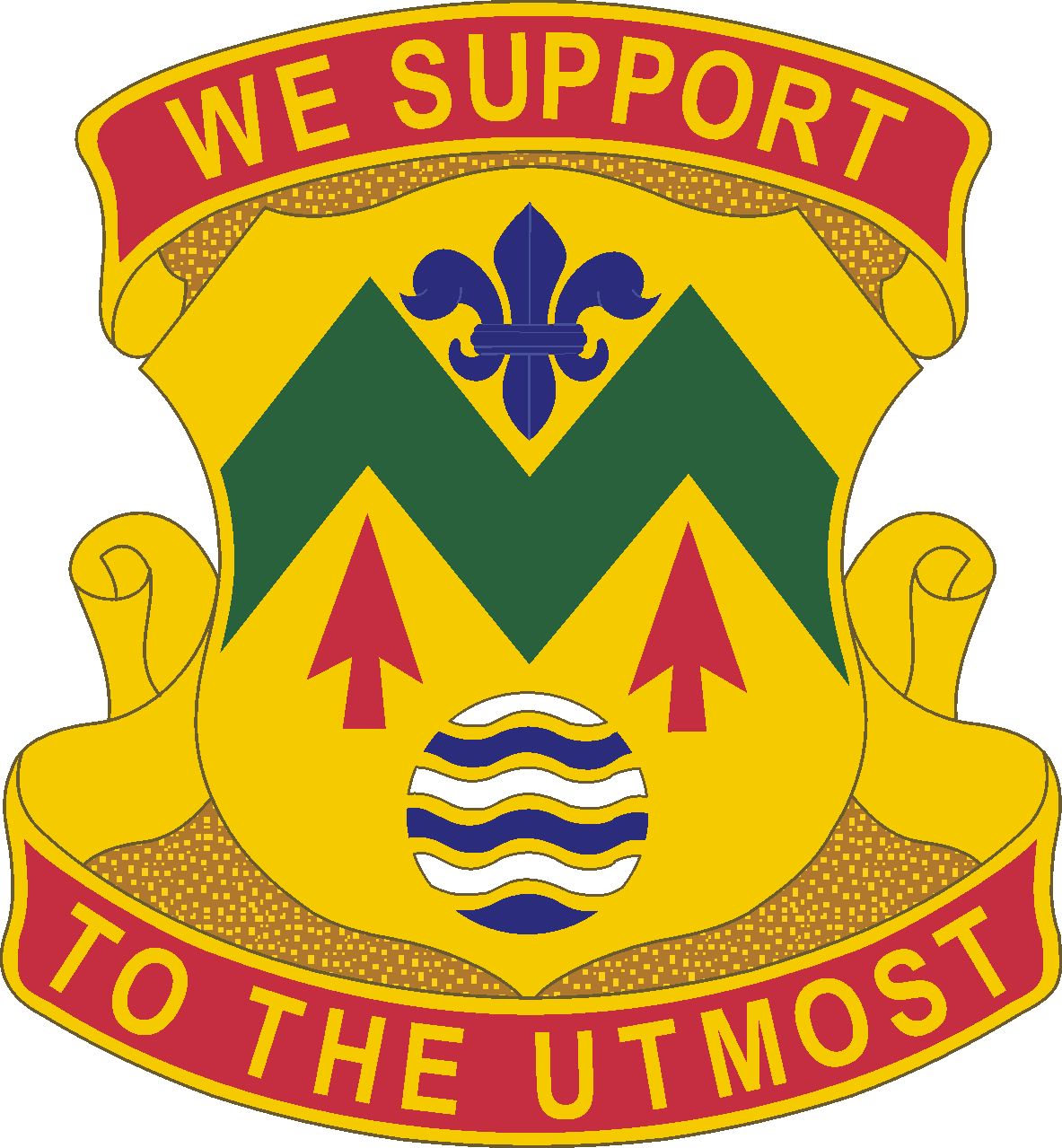
- Distinctive unit insignia

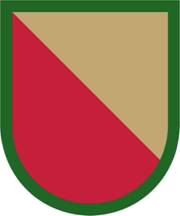
- Beret flash

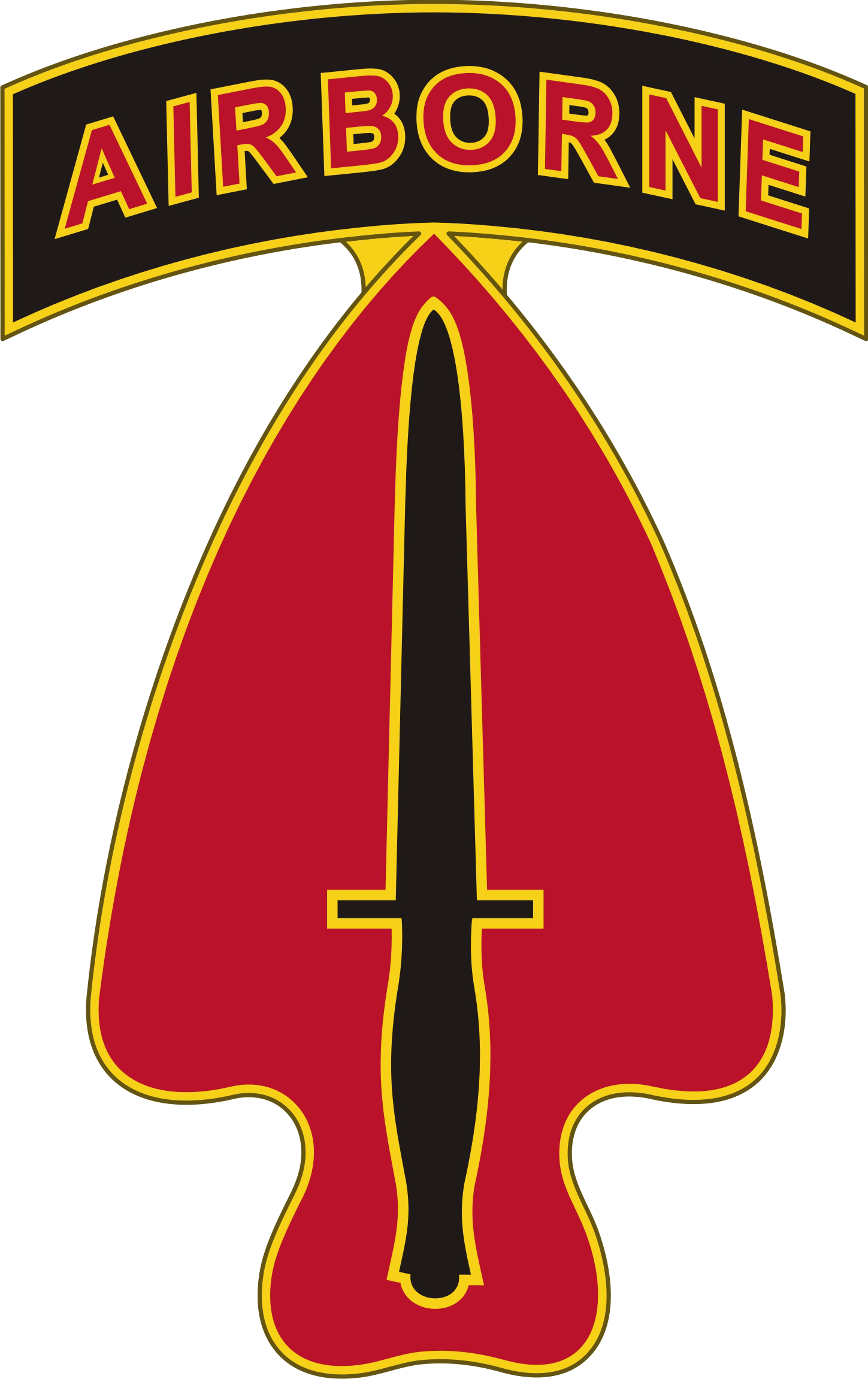
- Former Combat service identification badge

The 528th Support Battalion is a battalion of the United States Army. The 528th Support Battalion's mission is to provide rapidly deployable CSS and HSS to ARSOF as directed. The 528th Support Battalion's strengths lie in its capability to support ARSOF-unique and low-density weapons and vehicles. The 528th complements [organic] 22 ARSOF CSS, HSS, and signal units. The support battalion consists of a headquarters and main support company (HMSC), three forward support companies and may receive augmentation from Theater Army. As part of Army Special Operations Command the unit, along with the 112th Signal Battalion, is tasked to provide full logistical support to Army Special Operations Forces forming along with several other units what was known as Special Operations Support Command, later reorganized as the 528th Sustainment Brigade. Brigade Troops Battalion includes a wide variety of military occupation specialists: riggers, drivers, medics, mechanics, engineers, fuelers, cooks, etc.

== ARSOF Support Historical Overview ==
The history of Army Special Operations Forces (ARSOF) Support begins in World War II, when the forerunners of today's support units were first activated. Like most ARSOF units, these support units were inactivated after WWII, but their lineage, and their wartime honors, live on today in the 528th Sustainment Brigade, 112th Signal Battalion, and 389th Military Intelligence Battalion. This brief historical narrative explains their evolution. In July 1942, the First Special Service Force (FSSF), an American-Canadian commando unit in the lineage of U.S. Army Special Forces (SF), was activated at Fort William Henry Harrison, Montana. It was made up of three combat regiments, and a separate service battalion, with Headquarters, Maintenance, and Service Companies. After leading the recapture of the Aleutian Islands, the FSSF moved to Italy, where it fought grueling mountain battles with the Germans in late 1943 and early 1944, held the defensive line at Anzio, and was among the first Allied units to occupy Rome on 4 June 1944. The Force spearheaded the amphibious assault on the southern coast of France (Operation DRAGOON) in August 1944, and fought its way inland before being disbanded on 5 December 1944. Elsewhere in the summer of 1942, at Camp Savage, Minnesota, Japanese-American soldiers entered the Military Intelligence Service (MIS) as linguists. One MIS unit, the 389th Translator Team, was activated in February 1945, and fought alongside the Army's 96th Infantry Division on Leyte, Philippines, and Okinawa, earning a Presidential Unit Citation. The 389th Military Intelligence Battalion carries on that lineage today. In December 1942, the 528th Quartermaster Service Battalion was activated at Camp McCain, Mississippi. It first saw action in Sicily in July 1943, as part of Lieutenant General George S. Patton's U.S. Seventh Army. Subsequent operations in Italy, France, and Germany earned the 528th Quartermaster Battalion (QMB) six campaign streamers. It was also awarded two bronze arrowheads for amphibious assault landings on Sicily and southern France.

Since 2008, the 528th Sustainment Brigade has perpetuated the lineage of the 528th QMB. On 14 July 1944, Headquarters, Seventh Army, at Lido de Roma, Italy, activated the 512th Airborne Signal Company, consisting of a wire section, radio section, message center, and Signal Office section. In August 1944, the 512th provided communications to the 1st Airborne Task Force during Operation DRAGOON. It was later merged into the 112th Airborne Army Signal Battalion, which activated on 10 February 1945 and parachuted into Germany with the First Allied Airborne Army in Operation VARSITY on 24 March 1945. The 112th Signal Battalion inherited the lineage of these two early airborne signal units. By the end of World War II, the lineage predecessors of the 528th Sustainment Brigade, and its component battalions (112th Signal and 389th Military Intelligence), had all been activated and seen combat. These units were inactivated following World War II, and none were reactivated for service in the Korean War. The 389th Military Intelligence Detachment was activated in 1962, and attached to the 11th Special Forces Group (SFG) the following year. In 1969, the 528th QMB was reactivated for duty in the Republic of Vietnam (RVN), where it supported conventional forces in the I Corps Tactical Zone/Military Region One until 1971. Logistical support for SF in Vietnam was provided by the Counterinsurgency Support Office, located in Okinawa, and by the 5th SFG Logistics Support Center, in Nha Trang, RVN. During the 1980s, ARSOF experienced significant growth and modernization following the failed mission to rescue U.S. hostages in Iran in April 1980 (Operation EAGLE CLAW).

The Army established the 1st Special Operations Command (1st SOCOM), under U.S. Army Forces Command, in 1982 at Fort Bragg, North Carolina (NC), as the headquarters for SF, Psychological Operations (PSYOP), Civil Affairs (CA), Ranger, and Special Operations Aviation units. A 1983 Army study validated the need for dedicated ARSOF support units. After this, 1st SOCOM staff officers began planning for the establishment and activation of a Special Operations Support Battalion (SOSB) and Special Operations Communications Battalion (SOCB). Their efforts came to fruition in 1986, with the activation of 1st SOCOM's first dedicated support units. The 13th Support Battalion was activated on 2 June 1986, at Fort Bragg, to provide dedicated administrative, logistical, and maintenance support to 1st SOCOM and, when directed, to other ARSOF. A year later, on 16 May 1987, the 13th was "reflagged" by the U.S. Army Institute of Heraldry as the 528th Support Battalion, but was often referred to as the 528th SOSB. Authorized 12 officers, 5 warrant officers, and 146 enlisted soldiers, it was organized into a headquarters company, and supply, maintenance, and transportation detachments. In 1988, the 528th adopted the motto: "We Support to the Utmost". On 17 September 1986, the 112th Signal Battalion was activated at Fort Bragg, with an authorized strength of 16 officers and 229 enlisted soldiers. Its mission was to provide tactical command and control communications to deployed Army and Joint Special Operations Forces. The battalion focused its efforts toward Special Operations Command, South (SOCSOUTH) and Special Operations Command, Europe (SOCEUR), which belonged to the two Army-supported combatant commands (U.S. Southern Command and U.S. European Command). 112th soldiers quickly identified themselves as "Shadow Warriors", derived from the unit motto Penetra Le Tenebre – Penetrate the Shadows. Initially, both the 528th SOSB and 112th Signal Battalion reported directly to 1st SOCOM, but they were later administratively aligned under the Commander, 4th PSYOP Group. This makeshift arrangement, known as the ARSOF Support Command, was in effect in May 1989, when the U.S. Army Forces Command published an inactivation order for the 528th SOSB, effective 15 September 1990. With the situation in Panama deteriorating in mid-1989, the 528th simultaneously prepared for war and inactivation.

The 528th SOSB and 112th Signal Battalion first entered combat in December 1989, supporting Operation Just Cause in Panama. Then, in late August 1990, both battalions deployed lead elements to Saudi Arabia as part of Operation DESERT SHIELD, remaining there through the end of Operation DESERT STORM in 1991. Spared from inactivation by its superb performance in Panama and the Persian Gulf, the 528th SOSB expanded from fewer than 200 to approximately 400 personnel over the next few years. Additionally, Theater Army Special Operations Support Commands (TASOSCs) were established in 1989-90 at each geographic combatant command (GCC) to coordinate logistical support to deployed SOF elements. In 1995, the Special Operations Support Command (SOSCOM) was activated to provide a brigade-level command structure for ARSOF Support units. That same year, signal detachments (SIGDETs) from the 112th Signal Battalion were permanently assigned to each of the five Theater Special Operations Commands (TSOCs). Special Operations Theater Support Elements (SOTSEs) from SOSCOM replaced the TASOSCs, performing the same coordination mission with a fraction of the personnel. In 2008, these were renamed ARSOF Liaison Elements (ALEs). SOSCOM units were among the first deployed following the 9/11 terrorist attacks on the United States. They accompanied Task Force Dagger (5th SFG) to Karshi-Kanabad (K2) Air Base, Uzbekistan, using it as an intermediate staging base for operations in Afghanistan in the early stages of Operation Enduring Freedom (OEF). When the focus shifted to Iraq in early 2003, the 528th SOSB and 112th Signal Battalion were again called on to support SF-led task forces in northern and western Iraq. Meanwhile, SOSCOM Headquarters was operationalized during the early days of [Operation Iraqi Freedom] (OIF), providing command and control for a Logistics Task Force supporting SOF in western Iraq. It was during this initial phase of the Global War on Terrorism that SOSCOM adopted the nickname "Sentinels", to reflect its constant state of readiness. In 2005, USASOC started implementing the ARSOF Logistics Transformation Plan, which shifted support personnel and resources from SOSCOM to the U.S. Army Special Forces Command (USASFC). Accordingly, both SOSCOM and the 528th SOSB were inactivated by year's end. In their place, a provisional Sustainment Brigade (Special Operations) and a Special Troops Battalion (STB) were established. Some 528th SOSB personnel positions were redistributed to help stand up SF group support battalions (GSBs), formally activated in 2009 to provide SFGs with sustainment, signal, and military intelligence capabilities. In December 2008, the 528th Sustainment Brigade (Special Operations) (Airborne) was activated, inheriting the 528th SOSB number and lineage. It commanded the 112th Signal Battalion, six ALEs, and an STB consisting of the 195th Forward Support Company (Nebraska Army National Guard), the 197th Special Troops Company (Texas Army National Guard), and a Special Operations Medical Detachment (SOMEDD), with two eight-man Special Operations Resuscitation Teams (SORTs).

In April 2008, the first SORT deployed to Afghanistan (OEF) as a proof-of-concept; its success helped justify a third SORT. From 2012 through 2016, SORTs operated in South Sudan, as part of Operation Observant Compass, the successful ARSOF-led mission to remove Joseph Kony's Lord's Resistance Army from the battlefield. Initially, the 528th Sustainment Brigade had reported directly to Headquarters, USASOC. This changed in July 2014, when USASOC provisionally established the 1st Special Forces Command (1st SFC) as a deployable ARSOF headquarters, replacing USASFC. In 2016, the Commanding General, 1st SFC, directed 528th soldiers to don the SF Shoulder Sleeve Insignia (SSI). This was the same SSI that their predecessors in the 528th SOSB and 112th Signal Battalion had worn twenty-five years earlier, while supporting the 5th SFG-led Army Special Operations Task Force during Operation Desert Shield and DESERT STORM. In 2015, USASOC approved the establishment of a provisional Military Intelligence Battalion, under the 528th Sustainment Brigade. It was formally activated in July 2019 as the 389th Military Intelligence Battalion, with an authorized strength of 5 officers, 5 warrant officers, and 86 enlisted personnel, organized into two companies, and a headquarters detachment. It provides command and control for intelligence operations in support of the 1st SFC, its subordinate SF, CA, and PSYOP units, and mission partners. The battalion can also deploy as part of a Special Operations Joint Task Force (SOJTF). In recent years, the 528th Sustainment Brigade, 112th Signal Battalion, 389th Military Intelligence Battalion, and STB have supported the counter-Islamic State of Iraq and Syria (ISIS) mission, known as Operation Inherent Resolve, as well as Operation Freedom's Sentinel in Afghanistan. They stand ready to support 1st SFC and its subordinate units "to the utmost," wherever and whenever the need arises. A chronological account of the organizational and operational history of these units, and other ARSOF legacy units, follows in the next section.

== 528th Historical Timeline ==
=== World War II ===
-15 December 1942 528th Quartermaster Service Battalion is activated at Camp McCain, Mississippi. The lineage predecessor of the 528th Sustainment Brigade, its four 160-man companies transport and distribute supplies, operate supply depots, and supervise civilian and prisoner of war (POW) labor.

-10 July 1943 Operation HUSKY, the Allied invasion of Sicily, begins. The 528th Quartermaster Service Battalion supports the U.S. Seventh Army, led by Lieutenant General (LTG) George S. Patton, earning its first campaign streamer and arrowhead.

-18 January 1944 528th Quartermaster Service Battalion is reorganized and redesignated as Headquarters and Headquarters Detachment, 528th Quartermaster Battalion (QMB). Companies A, B, C, and D become the 4098th, 4099th, 4100th, and 4128th Quartermaster Service Companies, respectively.

-14 August 1944 Operation DRAGOON, the Allied invasion of southern France, begins. The 528th QMB, the 512th Airborne Signal Company, and the FSSF Service Battalion all participate.

-8 May 1945 Victory in Europe (V-E) Day. The war in Europe ends with the unconditional surrender of Nazi Germany. The 528th QMB remains in Europe on occupation duty, experiencing a number of redesignations and reorganizations until its eventual inactivation on 20 November 1947.

=== Post-World War II ===
-12 October 1948 528th QMB is transferred to the Organized Reserve Corps, and reactivated on 22 October at Clarksburg, West Virginia.

=== Korean War ===
15 January 1952 Headquarters and Headquarters Detachment, 528th Quartermaster Battalion is taken from the Organized Reserve Corps and returned to the Regular Army. It is activated on 1 February 1952 at Camp Atterbury, Indiana.

=== Vietnam War ===
-25 November 1966 The 528th QMB is inactivated at Fort Lee, Virginia.

-25 September 1969 The 528th QMB is activated in Phu Bai, Republic of Vietnam. Beginning a new chapter in its history, the 528th Quartermaster Battalion was reactivated on 25 September 1969 at Phu Bai, in the Republic of South Vietnam. Organized as a Corps-level command and control headquarters for petroleum and transportation companies, the battalion was assigned to I Corps, the northernmost military operational area in South Vietnam. Although organized as a petroleum supply battalion the 528th instead assumed the ammunition supply mission for I Corps. In that capacity, the 528th Quartermaster Battalion inherited three ordnance (ammunition) companies, a transportation detachment, and four explosive ordnance disposal (EOD) detachments.A LEGACY OF SUPPORT The 528th Sustainment Brigade by Robert W. Jones, Jr.

-15 April 1971 528th QMB inactivated at Da Nang, Republic of Vietnam. The withdrawal of most U.S. combat troops in 1971 includes the 528th QMB. During its eighteen months in Vietnam, the 528th qualifies for four campaign streamers.

=== Post Vietnam ===
-1 October 1982 1st Special Operations Command (Airborne) (Provisional) is established at Fort Bragg, NC. It assumes command and control of ARSOF from U.S. Army Forces Command.

-August 1984 1st SOCOM staff officers begin planning for a Special Operations Support Battalion (SOSB), and a Special Operations Communications Battalion (SOCB). Lieutenant Colonel Louis G. Mason, G-4, 1st SOCOM, leads the SOSB planning effort. Major James D. 'Dave' Bryan, G-6, 1st SOCOM, is the lead for the SOCB.

-17 December 1985 Department of the Army publishes activation order for the 13th Special Forces Battalion (Special Operations). It will be authorized 7 officers, 3 warrant officers, and 77 enlisted soldiers, which is half of what is authorized by the SOSB Table of Organization and Equipment, approved 1 April 1985. An amended order, dated 13 May 1986, clarifies that the new battalion will be the 13th Support Battalion, Special Operations.

-2 June 1986 The 13th Support Battalion is activated at Fort Bragg, NC, as the SOSB for 1st SOCOM. Its mission is to provide dedicated administrative and logistical support to 1st SOCOM, and, when directed, to provide direct support to its units. It is organized into a Headquarters Company, Supply Detachment, Maintenance Detachment, and Transportation Detachment.

-16 May 1987 The 13th Support Battalion is consolidated with the 528th Quartermaster Battalion to become the 528th Support Battalion. Better known as the 528th Special Operations Support Battalion (SOSB), it has an authorized strength of 12 officers, 5 warrant officers, and 146 enlisted soldiers.

-1988–1989 528th SOSB logisticians deploy to Bahrain to support Operations PRIME CHANCE and EARNEST WILL. It is the first of many operational deployments for the battalion.

-11 May 1989 U.S. Forces Command (FORSCOM) orders the inactivation of the 528th Support Battalion, effective 15 September 1990.

=== Just Cause ===
-20 December 1989 Operation JUST CAUSE begins in Panama. The 528th SOSB deploys a Forward Arming and Refueling Point (FARP) team and a Logistical Support Element. The 112th Signal Battalion deploys seven, three-person Special Operations Communications Assemblage (SOCA) teams, and several staff planners. Following JUST CAUSE, elements of the 528th and 112th remain in Panama supporting Operation PROMOTE LIBERTY, until mid-1990.

Members of the unit were awarded a Joint MeritoriousUnit Award (Joint Staff Permanent order # J-1SO-0322-91) for participation in the JSOC JTF. The JTF consisted of the following commands/units: 3d Battalion, 7th Special Forces Group (ABN); 4th Battalion, 6th Infantry (mechanized); SEAL team four; SEAL team two; Naval Special Warfare group two; navy Special warfare unit eight; Special boat Unit 26; 436th Military Airlift Wing; 437th military airlift wing; 317th tactical airlift wing; 37th tactical fighter wing; 41st Electronic Combat Squadron; 390th electronic combat squadron; 7th Air combat control squadron; 1720th Special tactics group, A Company, 1st battalion, 7th Special Forces Group, 617th Special Operations aviation detachment; Special Operations command south~ C company, 1st battalion, 508th infantry regiment. Additionally, Individuals or sub-elements of the following units were also Assigned: 528th support battalion; 228th aviation battalion; 173 0th combat control squadron; 3rd Battalion, 73rd armor (ABN); 4th psychological Operations group; 1721st combat control squadron; 504th military police company; headquarters platoon, 1st platoon, and 3rd platoon of company d, 2nd light armor infantry battalion, 2nd marine division; 96th civil affairs battalion; 1723rd combat Control squadron; 1st platoon, a company, 7th engineer battalion Apache section, 2nd Battalion, 82nd combat aviation brigade.

=== Post-Cold War ===
-6 March 1990 At the urging of the Commander, USSOCOM, the Vice Chief of Staff of the Army (VCSA) delays inactivation of the 528th Support Battalion. The 528th's performance in Panama caused the Department of the Army to reconsider its decision to inactivate the battalion. The Army commissions an in-depth study of ARSOF logistics.

-2 August 1990 Iraq invades Kuwait. The U.S. responds with Operation DESERT SHIELD to prevent further Iraqi aggression. Both the 528th SOSB and 112th Signal Battalion receive alert orders on 9 August, and soldiers from both units deploy to Saudi Arabia with 5th SFG, which forms the core of an Army Special Operations Task Force (ARSOTF). The 528th also supports 3rd Battalion, 160th Special Operations Aviation Regiment.

-27 November 1990 The U.S. Army Special Forces Command (USASFC) is formally activated at Fort Bragg, NC. It replaces 1st SOCOM as the higher headquarters for the 112th Signal Battalion and the 528th Support Battalion. 17 December 1990 ARSOF Combat Service Support Review validates the need for both TASOSCs, and a SOSB. Prepared by USASOC for the Commander, USSOCOM, and the VCSA, the report includes a concept for a more robust SOSB, with a Headquarters, Main Support Company, and three Forward Support Companies, totaling 745 personnel. The proposal is never fully adopted, but the SOSB does grow considerably in the early 1990s.

-17 January 1991 Operation DESERT STORM begins with an intense air campaign. The goal is to expel Iraqi forces from Kuwait.

-24 February 1991 The 100-hour ground war begins. The U.S.-led coalition drives the Iraqi Army from Kuwait, and President George H.W. Bush announces a ceasefire on 28 February. Throughout DESERT SHIELD and DESERT STORM, the 528th SOSB supplies Class I (food and water), Class III (Petroleum, Oils, Lubricants), Class V (ammunition), Class VI (personal items), and provides an arrival/ departure airfield control group, direct support transportation and maintenance, and water production to the ARSOF and other SOF in theater.

-6 April 1991 Joint Task Force (JTF) PROVIDE COMFORT formed; deploys to Incirlik, Turkey. 7th Special Operations Support Command, 528th SOSB, and 112th Signal Battalion support JTF Alpha (10th SFG) and JTF Bravo (24th Marine Expeditionary Unit) efforts to protect the Kurdish population from Iraqi military reprisals and prevent a humanitarian crisis.

-Fall 1991 Materiel Management Activity (MMA) added to the 528th Support Battalion Table of Organization and Equipment. Later renamed the Materiel Management Center (MMC), it provides the 528th with a deployable element capable of consolidating all active duty ARSOF assets under a single property book management system. Although part of the 528th, the MMA is attached to the G-4, USASOC.

-15 October 1992 528th Support Battalion and 112th Signal Battalion are realigned under USASOC.

-19 September 1994–31 March 1995 Operation UPHOLD DEMOCRACY. 112th Signal Battalion soldiers are among the first soldiers into Port-au-Prince, Haiti, supporting the Army Special Operations Task Force. The Forward Support Element, 528th SOSB, performs a wide variety of humanitarian assistance missions, in addition to supporting 3rd SFG. Its soldiers are awarded the Humanitarian Service Medal.

-29 June 1995 At the direction of the Command General, USASOC, the Special Operations Support Command (SOSCOM) is provisionally established at Fort Bragg, NC. Its mission is to plan, coordinate, and provide communications and basic combat service support to all ARSOF.

-8 December 1995 Special Operations Support Command is activated. A Table of Distribution and Allowances (TDA) unit, it provides a brigade-level headquarters for the 528th Support Battalion, 112th Signal Battalion, and USASOC MMC.

-16 August 1999 The Special Operations Logistics (SOFLOG) Area is opened on Fort Bragg, NC. It is dedicated to Special Forces Medal of Honor recipient, Master Sergeant Roy P. Benavidez.

=== Global War on Terror & Overseas Contingency Operations ===
-6–7 October 2001 Operation ENDURING FREEDOM begins in Afghanistan. Company A, 112th Signal Battalion, and Company A, 528th SOSB are among the first ARSOF units deployed to Camp Freedom at Karshi-Kanabad (K2) Air Base, Uzbekistan, to support the Joint Special Operations Task Force – North (JSOTF-North, or Task Force Dagger). The core of JSOTF-N, 5th SFG headquarters, arrives on 10 October.

Logistics Operations in the Early Campaign Prior to OEF, Army Special Operations Forces (ARSOF) were accustomed to deploying and operating independently in small teams. Thus, their logistics needs were limited. In 2001 the existing, nondeployable, Special Operations Support Command (SOSCOM) with one support battalion, two forward support companies, and one headquarters company was sufficient to meet ARSOF team-oriented logistics requirements. However, when the 5th SFG deployed to K2 and became the JSOTF-N, the assigned forward support element—Alpha Company, 528th Special Operations Support Battalion—was nearly overwhelmed with the enormity of logistics requests. There were approximately 400 Soldiers in the entire 528th Support Battalion to provide combat service support for 15,000 Soldiers in the ARSOF. This ratio appears inadequate in contrast to conventional force ratios that normally allow for 3,300 support personnel for a combat division that normally has 15,000 Soldiers.60 Nevertheless, the Soldiers of the 528th shouldered the huge burden at K2 by quickly establishing a warehouse, a clothing distribution center, a dining facility, and ration and refueling points. The 507th Corps Support Command replaced the 528th in December 2001 after SF combat operations in northern Afghanistan had subsided.

=== Operation Iraqi Freedom ===
17 March to 12 May 2003 Bravo Forward Support Company (BFSC), 528th Special Operations Support Battalion, supported the Combined Joint Special Operations Task Force-North (CJSOTF-N) Task Force Viking located at the Mihail Kogălniceanu Air Base, Romania and Irbil, Iraq. Task Force Viking, dramatically advanced the success of Operation Iraqi Freedom (OIF) by employing UW forces against a conventional enemy comprising one armor, two mechanized, and eight infantry divisions. By doing so, they disrupted the enemy and reduced his ability to reinforce southern Iraq. Having defeated the enemy to its front, CJSOTF-N then switched its focus from offensive combat to establishing stability throughout the region. BFSC's meritorious achievements in support of Task Force Viking operations in support of the Global War on Terrorism and OPERATION IRAQI FREEDOM were simply outstanding. North by Northwest: Combat Service Support in Northern Iraq Leading Direct Support (DS) vehicle and equipment maintenance, Supply Support Activity, medical support, sick call operations, water purification and distribution, Laundry and Bath, DS aviation refueling operations, Bare Base Engineering and power distribution, movement control operations and tasking management are just some of the notable accomplishments of the company. Upon arrival in Iraq, there were no fixed facilities available for the JSOTF BFSC RSOI, and Bare Base elements rapidly established an entire working and living infrastructure for 2400 personnel in a matter of days. Once the unit landed in Irbil Iraq, BFSC's Base Support Platoon immediately began clearing land, erecting tents, building floors, and multiple other construction projects. The units' Base Support Platoon proved to be a critical combat multiplier for the entire operation. By the end of the deployment, BFSC Engineers, electricians, carpenters, and ECU and Generator mechanics completed over 250 separate Jobs. On D-Day minus four, the company Supply and Service Platoon infilled two Fuel System Supply Points into northern Iraq vicinity Bashur and As Sulaymaniyah. This mission marked the first Combat Service Support Unit to enter the Iraqi theater of operations. Establishing this contingency bulk fuel storage site deep inside Northern Iraq was instrumental in the accomplishment of Combat Search and Rescue missions and Special Reconnaissance Infils. Later in the conflict, these fuel farms established a critical re-supply point for the 352nd Special Operations Group, the 26th Marine Expeditionary Force, and the 101st Airborne division. On one critical mission, the Al Sulaymaniyah operation fueled a beleaguered MC-130 so it could exfil from the theater of operations. The Bashur fuel team had already pumped 33,000 gallons to Special Operation Helicopters when the 173rd Airborne Brigade parachuted onto the airfield. By the end of the war, BFSC had received and issued over 350,000 gallons of JP-8 fuel from every conceivable source, including Air Force C-17, SOG MC-130 Wet wing, and GLOC fuel from Turkey. Supply support was especially critical during the initial phases of OPERATION IRAQI FREEDOM. Initially, all available sustainment airlift was consumed with building a basic stockage level of rations and bottled water for the task force. BFSC played a critical role in advising the CJSOTF Commander and his staff on which quantities and types of supplies should be prioritized. Once the necessary communications systems were in place, the company quickly established links to the theater army material management center. This enabled the JSOTF units to order supplies using the automated supply system (SARSS). By the end of the conflict, over 6.4 million dollars of supply requests had been processed and the supply support activity had processed over 200 pallets of equipment and supplies for issue. In February 2003, Bravo 528th deployed a movement control team to Fort Carson, CO to provide movement expertise to the 10th Special Forces Group as it prepared to deploy to Operation IRAQI FREEDOM. The Transportation platoon coordinated the movement of 18 chalks of C17s and prepared BFSC 528th SOSB for deployment to Turkey. Subsequently, a team deployed to an ISB in Stuttgart, Germany where they rapidly established an MCT from an ad hoc group of soldiers. Bravo 528th demonstrated great flexibility in redirecting cargo from Turkey to Romania after the Turkish Parliament declined a U.S. request to use its bases for operations. While managing the airfield in Stuttgart, the MCT uploaded more than 35 Air Force aircraft, exceeding 400 short tons of mission-critical equipment needed for combat operations. Upon completing the mission in Germany, Bravo 528th deployed to Constanta, Romania, where it established an A/DACG and became the key player in airfield operations. The company formed a logistical bridge between the Air Force TALCE and supported units of CJSOTF-N. Using the seasoned organic MCT, they trained 10 additional soldiers who then flawlessly operated an A/DACG that normally requires an entire company to run. Through long hours and hard work, the transportation platoon managed the reception of 73 C17s, 32 C130s, 10 C5s and 4 L100s, as well as a variety of commercial aircraft. The MCT supervised the offload of over 3250 short tons: 460 pallets and ISU containers, 500 pieces of rolling stock, and over 1000 passengers. From Romania, Bravo 528th masterfully orchestrated CJSOTF-N's movement to Iraq as the lead element of a Joint Movement Control Center. The MCC assessed the situation, took charge, established the standard, and managed 59 chalks of C17s destined for combat. The MCC moved 2300 short tons of combat equipment and sustainment packages to Bashur, Iraq in its role as the only DS transportation executor available to CJSOTF-N, BFSC led and planned the strategic movement for three Special Forces battalions, an Air Force Special Operations Group, a coalition Special Forces squadron, a light infantry battalion and multiple support assets in areas outside US control under combat conditions. Once in the enemy's backyard, the transportation platoon was the single link between the CJSOTF-N and its logistical lifeline. Bravo 528th truck squads acted as the critical link from the ports of debarkation to the CJSOTF-N for both ALOCs and GLOCs. BFSC trucks made countless convoys to Bashur, Mosul, Kirkuk, and Al Sulaymaniah, Iraq.

=== Narrative justification for the Meritorious Unit Commendation ===
- On 10 September 2002, Alpha Forward Support Company (AFSC) deployed with the initial build up of Army Special Operations Forces (ARSOF) in preparation for combat operations in support of Operation Iraqi Freedom. AFSC was instrumental in the logistical support to ARSOF units during pre-war train-up and to Combined Joint Special Operations Task Force West (CJSOTF-W) during the execution of combat operations and continued to provide logistics operations in support of CJSOTF-AP (Arabian Peninsula) in Baghdad, Iraq until relieved in place by another 528th SOSB Forward Support Company.
- Alpha Company established operations and logistics support throughout Jordan, Saudi Arabia and IRAQ. The company identified shortfalls within a support infrastructure incapable of meeting the demands imposed on it and postured logistics assets to provide much needed support in fuel, food, ammunition, water purification and distribution, engineer, medical and direct support maintenance operations. AFSC provided over 165,004 gallons of JP8, 10,168 gallons of MOGAS, 10,816 gallons of DF2. Purified over 324,400 gallons of water and distributed a total of 843,150 gallons of purified and unpurified water. Managed an Ammo Supply point of over 265 short tons of ammunition. RSOI'd more that 3654 short tons from military airlift and military sealift command. Received over 377 engineering, electrical and barebase support jobs and completed over 564 direct support maintenance jobs were completed. More than 2,000 soldiers, marines, airmen and coalition forces directly benefited from their actions.
- AFSC was actively involved in the support of 14 Operational Detachment Alpha's (ODA), two Operational Detachment Bravo's (ODB) and other Joint Special Operations Forces to prevent the launch of tactical ballistic missiles in the western area of operation during combat operations. The Company deployed a Forward Logistical Element to support the infiltration ARSOF forces into IRAQ on D-4. This included fuel, water, Class I and maintenance support teams. The company ensured maintenance assets and supplies were ready for immediate insertion into the combat zone regardless of the circumstances. Moreover, they were fully engaged in ensuring all requests for direct support maintenance from the ODB and CJSOTF-W were immediately fulfilled. This entailed preparing soldiers and equipment on short notice for insertion into hostile areas of operations. As a result, all re-supply and maintenance operations were carried out in an effective and efficient manner. The company also played a vital role in support of Extended Reach, a mission to forward deploy medical and support assets to reduce the response time of medical support to critically wounded coalition soldiers.
- Finally, as combat operations ebbed and the demand for forward support increased, the company formulated plans to meet the support requirements of CJSOTF-AP and followed through with their execution until relieved by CFSC from the 528th SOSB. This support is ongoing today.
- Bravo Forward Support Company (BFSC), 528th Special Operations Support Battalion deployed on 12 February 2003 to support of CFSOCC, Combined Joint Special operations Task Force-North (CJSOTF-N) located in Constanta, Romania and Irbil, Iraq.
- On D-4 the company supply and service platoon infiltrated two Fuel System Supply Points into northern Iraq. This mission marked the first Combat Service Support Unit to enter the Iraqi theatre of operations. Establishing this contingency bulk fuel storage site deep inside Northern Iraq was instrumental in the accomplishment of Combat Search and Rescue missions and Special Reconnaissance infiltrations. Later in the conflict, these fuel farms established a critical resupply point for the 352nd Special Operations Group, the 26th Marine Expeditionary Force, and the 101st Airborne Division. The BFSC fuel team had issued over 350,000 gallons of JP-8 fuel from every conceivable source, including Air Force C-17, SOG MC-130 Wet wing, and GLOC fuel from Turkey.
- BFSC RSOI and Bare Base elements rapidly established an entire working and living infrastructure for 2400 personnel in a matter of days. By the end of the deployment, the BFSC engineers, electricians, carpenters, and ECU and generator mechanics completed over 250 separate jobs.
- Once communications systems were in place, the company established links to order supplies using the automated supply system (SARSS). BFSC managed over 6.4 million dollars of supply requests had been processed and the supply support activity had processed over 200 pallets of equipment and supplies for issue.
- Bravo 528th deployed soldiers to Constanta, Romania, to establish an A/DACG in support of airfield operations. The transportation platoon managed the reception of 73 C-17s, 32 C-130s, 10 C-5s, and 4 L-100s, as well as a variety of commercial aircraft. The MCT supervised the offload of over 3250 short tons consisting of 460 pallets and ISU containers, 500 pieces of rolling stock and over 1000 passengers. Once in Iraq, the MCT managed 59 chalks of C-17s destined for combat. The MCT moved 2300 short tons of combat equipment and sustainment packages to Bashur, Iraq. By the end of the operation, Bravo 528th's transportation platoon logged over 10,000 accident free miles.
- Upon alert notification, the Headquarters and Main Support Company (HMSC) 528th Special Operations Support Battalion (Airborne) was prepared to deploy in support of Army Special Operations Forces (ARSOF) for Operation IRAQI FREEDOM. The battalion subsequently trained and deployed soldiers from Fort Bragg, North Carolina to Kuwait, Jordan, Romania, and Turkey in support of JSOTF-W, JSOTF-N, and CFSOCC Headquarters. These soldiers provided food service support, medical support, engineer support, and maintenance support for Army and all non-standard vehicles, supply support activities, supply and service modules, and a logistics tactical operations center for the Western Desert and the Northern area of Iraq.
- The HMSC deployed a logistics tactical operations center to Prince Hasan Air Base (H5) on 23 February 2003. The unit's mission was to assume the role as Commandant of base operations and to oversee logistic operations for SOF in the Western Desert. The battalion quickly took charge of the integration and reception of incoming soldiers, provided food service and field service, centrally managed a receiving point, managed an ammunition storage point, managed movement control of ground movement, supported airfield support operations with an ADACG team, provided Medical resupply operations, DS Maintenance support, fuel support for an Air Force Squadron of A-10's.
- The battalion integrated a Biological Detection Platoon from the 7th Chemical Company into the 528th SOSB(A) Battalion operations node. They supervised the development of a comprehensive biological defense plan for H5 and the nearby city ensuring all soldiers and citizens were protected. As a result of their efforts, all combat units on H5 were prepared for a biological attack from Iraq.
- The battalion was also responsible for all Mortuary Affairs operations for the entire Iraqi Western Desert. Quickly integrating a young inexperienced Mortuary Affairs Team into the battalion. Ensuring that the Mortuary Affairs section received an adequate and secure work area, proper military police coverage, and necessary medical support. As a result of battalion operations oversight, the Mortuary Affairs Collection Point (MACP) was ready to handle and process remains prior to D-Day. During combat operations the MACP handled 15 remains with the utmost of dignity and respect.
- After Baghdad was secured, the HMSC provided a support element to the CFSOCC Headquarters as it relocated from Qatar to Baghdad International Airport. The unit established a base of operations while providing water, maintenance and engineer support to the CFSOCC Commander allowing him to continue to command and control of all Special Operations Forces in the theater of operation.
- In support of Operation Iraqi Freedom, Special Operations Forces (SOF) were instrumental in rapidly achieving the national objectives, as directed by the Combatant Commander. These tremendous feats could not have been possible without the professionalism, valor and dedication to excellence demonstrated by the soldiers of the 528th Special Operations Support Battalion in support of every mission. In an extremely dynamic environment, the innovation and determination of these great professionals was directly responsible to the overarching success of Special Operations Forces deployed throughout the theatre. Every Special Operations Commander was able to meet the requirements of the nation and demonstrate the capability of the United States to achieve a wide range of national objectives, across the entire spectrum of the special operations mission set. The significant combat accomplishments of the men and women of the 528th Special Operations Support Battalion clearly demonstrate their extraordinary devotion to duty. It is in keeping with the highest standards of military service. Their contributions reflect great credit on themselves, the Department of the Army and the United States of America.

=== 80th Anniversary ===
-15 December 2022 marked the 80th anniversary of Special Operations support. In order to celebrate this milestone, a unit tribute plaque was placed in the United States Army National Museum's Path of Remembrance.

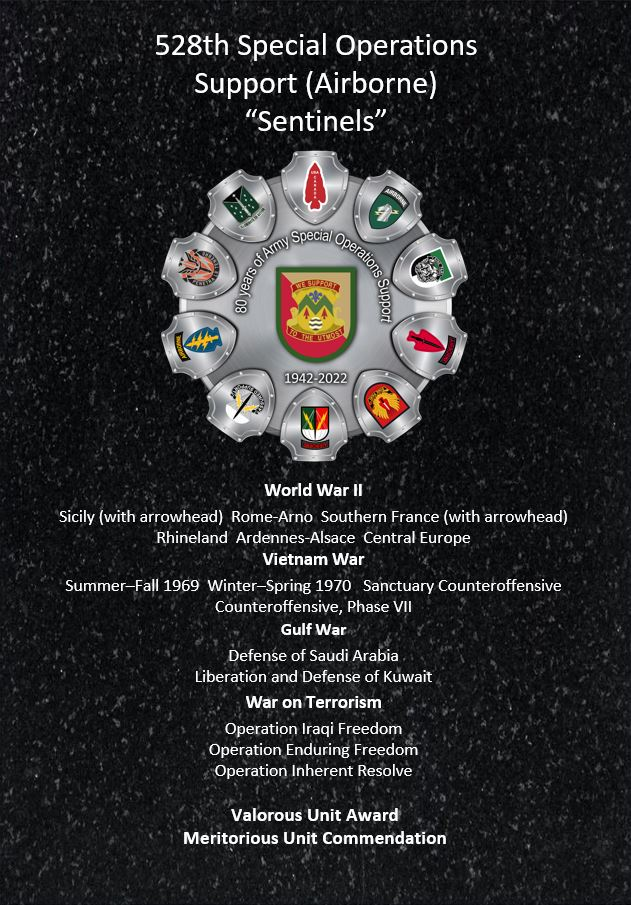

== Current status ==
528th Special Operations Support Battalion (A) was transformed into the Brigade Troops Battalion (Airborne) on 2 December 2005. It was originally formed by redesignating the 13th Support Battalion 16 May 1987 and organized into three companies: HQ, A, and B. The lettered companies were formed as forward support units. On 8 December 2008 it was redesignated as the 528th Special Troops Battalion (Special Operations) (Airborne) under the 528th Sustainment Brigade (SO) (A).When it redesignated into the 528th Special Troops Battalion (SO) (A) it reorganized to contain the Headquarters and Headquarters Company (HHC) and the Special Operations Medical Detachment (SOMEDD). The SOMEDD is currently aligned to contain three Special Operations Resuscitation Teams (SORT), the teams consist of a flight surgeon, an emergency nurse, three special operations combat medics, a laboratory technician, a radiology technician and a patient administration clerk. The SORT is a robust medical team that is capable of providing expeditionary, combat health support along with prolonged field care through CASEVAC of opportunity and also offering advanced trauma and resuscitative care with holding and CASEVAC management. The SORT is conceived as being adaptive and modular to provide forward support for SOF in austere locations. The SOMEDD also contains medical logistic, medical maintenance and dental assets.

== Lineage ==
Throughout its short history the battalion was inactivated, reactivated, and redesignated numerous times. Officially it was constituted on 4 December 1942 in the US Army as Headquarters and Headquarters Detachment (HHD), 528th Quartermaster Service Battalion and then activated on the 15th of same month at Camp McCain, MS. Further important dates are listed below:

4 December 1942 Constituted in the Army of the United States as the 528th Quartermaster Service Battalion
15 December 1942 Activated at Camp McCain, MS
18 January 1944 Battalion broken up and its elements reorganized and redesignated as follows-

1. Headquarters and Headquarters Detachment as Headquarters and Headquarters Detachment, 528th Quartermaster Battalion
2. Companies A, B, C, and D as the 4098th, 4099th, 4100th, and 4128th Quartermaster Service Companies, respectively – hereafter separate lineages

24 May 1946 – Headquarters and Headquarters Detachment, 528th Quartermaster Battalion reorganized and redesignated as Headquarters and Headquarters Detachment, 528th Quartermaster Battalion, Mobile
1 Aug 1946 – HHD 528 Transportation Corps Truck Battalion (TCTB)
1 Feb 1947 – HHD 528 QB
20 Nov 1947 – Inactivated (France)
12 Oct 1948 – HHD 426 Quartermaster Battalion allotted to Organized Reserve Corps (ORC) and assigned to the 2nd Army
22 Oct 1948 – Activated at Clarksburg, WV
8 Nov 1950 – Inactivated (West Virginia), withdrawn from ORC
15 Jan 1952 – Redesignated as Headquarters and Headquarters Detachment, 528th Quartermaster Battalion; concurrently withdrawn from the Organized Reserve Corps and allotted to the Regular Army
1 Feb 1952 – Activated at Camp Atterbury, IN
25 Nov 1966 – Inactivated (Fort Lee, Virginia)
5 Sep 1969 – HHD 528 Quartermaster Battalion reorganized
25 Sep 1969 – Activated at Phu Bai, Vietnam
15 Apr 1971 – Inactivated (Vietnam)
3 Jun 1986 – 13 SB organized and consolidated with
16 May 1987 – Consolidated with the 13th Support Battalion (active) (constituted 3 June 1986 in the Regular Army and activated at Fort Bragg, NC); consolidated unit concurrently redesignated as the 528th Support Battalion
1 Nov 1995 – 528 SOSB (A) allotted to SOSCOM
17 October 2005 - Inactivated at Fort Bragg, North Carolina organic elements distributed to 3rd and 7th Special Forces Group (A) to create Group Support Battalions
18 October 2007 - Headquarters redesignated as Headquarters and Headquarters Company, 528th Sustainment Brigade (organic elements concurrently disbanded) assets succeeded to the Brigade Troops Battalion (Airborne)

== Campaign participation credit ==
Conflict	Streamer	Year(s)
World War II	Sicily (with arrowhead)	1942
World War II	Rome-Arno	1944–1945
World War II	Southern France (with arrowhead)	1944–1945
World War II	Rhineland	1945
World War II	Ardennes-Alsace	1945
World War II	Central Europe	1945
Vietnam War	Summer–Fall 1969	1969
Vietnam War	Winter–Spring 1970	1970
Vietnam War	Sanctuary Counteroffensive	1970
Vietnam War	Counteroffensive, Phase VII	1970–1971
Defense of Saudi Arabia	Saudi Arabia	1991
Liberation and Defense of Kuwait	Kuwait	1991
War on Terrorism	Worldwide	1991-TBD

== Decorations ==
Ribbon	Award	Year	Notes
	Valorous Unit Award	1991	IRAQ-KUWAIT (17 Jan. 1991 – 28 Feb. 1991, DAGO 14, 1993)(DAGO 12, 1994)
	Meritorious Unit Commendation (Army)	2001-2004	Operation Enduring Freedom Permanent orders 246-19 2 September 2008

== Distinctive unit insignia ==
The insignia is the shield and motto of the coat of arms. The insignia was authorized for wear on 14 Jan. 1988

- Blazon
  - Shield: Or, a dance of two vert between a fleur-de-lis and two arrowheads gules, in base a fountain
  - Crest: On a wreath of the colors (or and vert) a semi-oriental winged dragon gules, armed and langued vert, grasping two arrows saltirewise of the first
  - Motto: We Support to the Utmost
- Symbolism: The heraldic dance is reminiscent of mountains while the fountain represents water. The fleur-de-lis is for France. These elements represent the service of the unit in Europe during World War II. The unit's two assault landings are indicated by the red arrowheads while the green refers to the organization's mission of support to Special Operations. The unit's service in Vietnam is symbolized by the dragon. Its wings and the crossed arrows refer to the battalion's mission and capabilities.

== Former Commanders & Command Sergeant Majors ==
- LTC Patrick Pallatto Jr., Commander from July 2004 until deactivation on 17 October 2005
- LTC Michael P. Saulnier, Commander from July 2002 to July 2004
- LTC Richard B. Burns, Commander from July 2000 to July 2002
- LTC Kenneth McMillin, Commander from July 1998 to July 2000
- LTC Albert E. Ballard, Commander from July 1996 to July 1998
- LTC Richard C. Burmood, Commander from July 1994 to July 1996
- LTC Donald E. Plater, Commander from July 1992 to July 1994
- LTC Norman A. Gebhard, Commander from June 1990 to July 1992
- LTC David L. Shaw, Commander from June 1988 to June 1990
- LTC Louis G. Mason, Commander from May 1987 to June 1988
- LTC Louis G. Mason, Commander from June 1986 to May 1987 Originally designated the 13th SOSB(A)

- CSM Charlie Lane 2001
- CSM Jimmy C. White 2000
- CSM Patrick Douglas 1998
- CSM Herbert Williams 1996
- CSM Eusebius P. Cadet 1995
- CSM Norfleet 1990
- CSM Lawis 1988
- CSM Kenneth R. Lewis 1986

== Distinguished Alumnus ==
1. MG Christopher Mohan, Commanding General of 21st Theater Sustainment Command and former AFSC Commander and Battalion Executive officer during Operation Enduring Freedom
2. MG Edward F. Dorman III, Commanding General of 8th Theater Sustainment Command and former Battalion Executive officer
3. BG Michelle K. Donahue the 56th Quartermaster Commandant and former Battalion S-2/3

== Organizational Charts ==
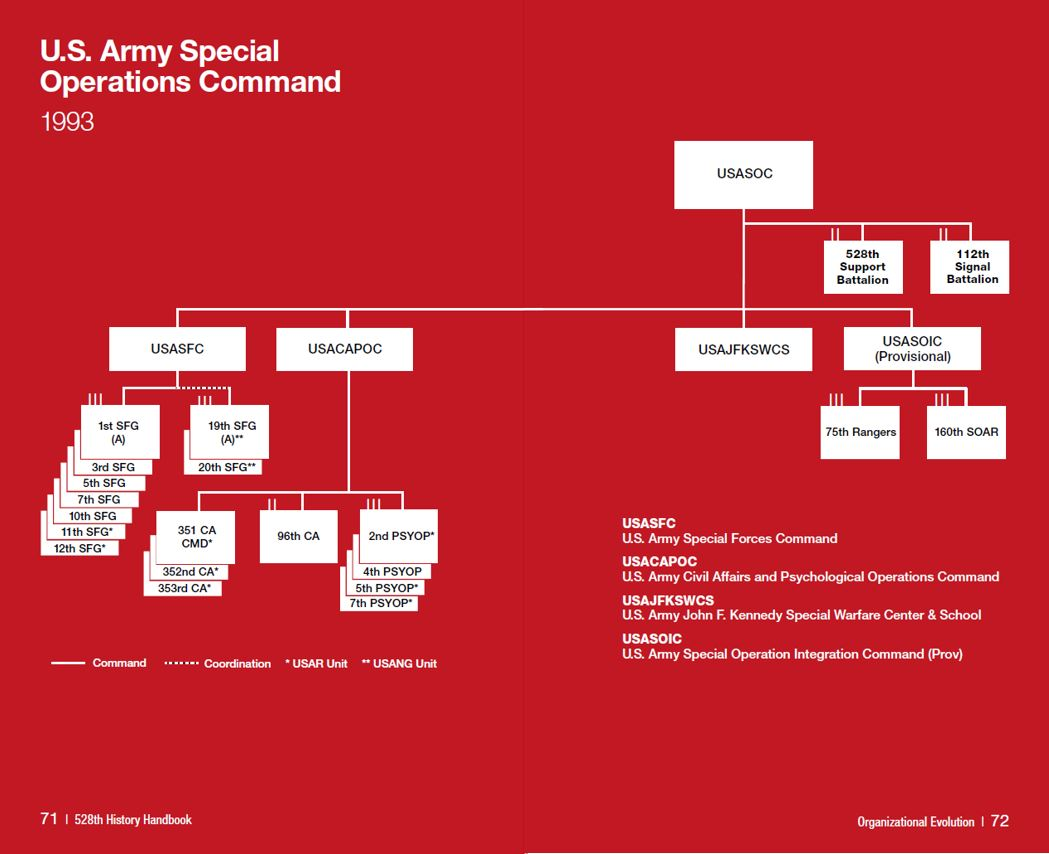
United States Army Special Operations Command Organizational Chart 1993

On the picture below 528 is on the far-right branch of the chain.

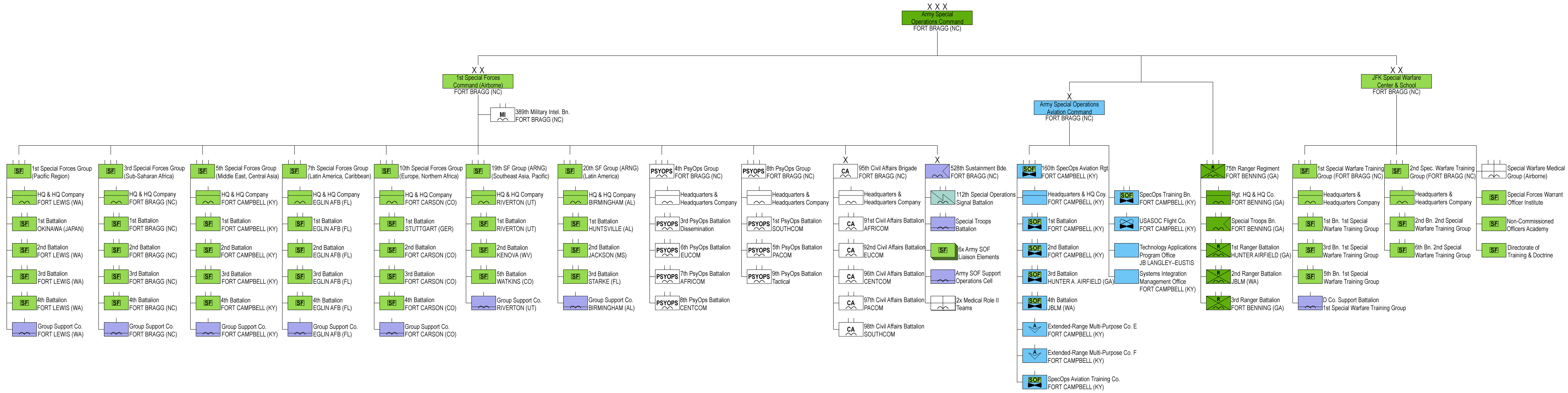
OrBat of the Army Special Operations Command (full resolution).

== See also ==
- Special Operations Support Command
- DOCTRINE FOR ARSOTF OPERATIONS
- USSOCOM Fact book 2010
- What's Missing in ARSOF Logistics?
- "PROVING THE CONCEPT" The 528th Support Battalion in Panama by Christopher E. Howard
- 1st Special Forces Group Support Battalion Enabling and Sustaining an Uncertain Future
- House Hearing, 110th Congress — {H.A.S.C. No. 110-12} CURRENT MANNING, EQUIPPING AND READINESS CHALLENGES FACING SPECIAL OPERATIONS FORCES
- Setting the Theater: Lessons Learned from Recent Operations by Colonel Michael B. Lalor
- Five Fort Bragg Soldiers To Receive Bronze Star
- Army Special Operations Support Command Army Logistician May-June 2001 pg 4-7
- Operation Northern Delay: The Evolution of Joint Forcible Entry
