= Task Force Viking =

Joint task force during invasion of Iraq

Combined Joint Special Operations Task Force – North
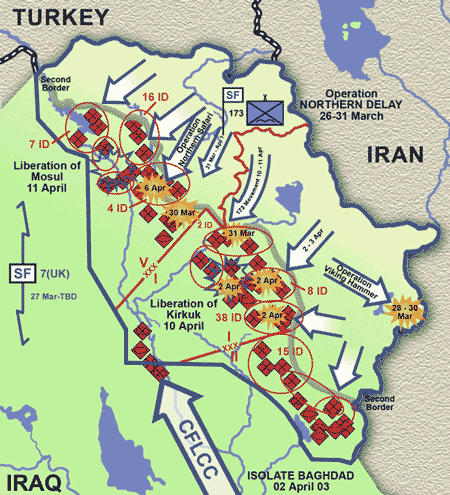
- The northern front during March and April 2003
- Active: March 2003 – May 12, 2003
- Disbanded: 12 May 2003
- Country: United States
- Allegiance: Multi-National Force – Iraq
- Branch: U.S. Army, U.S. Air Force, U.S. Marine Corps, United Kingdom Special Forces
- Type: Joint Task Force
- Role: Special Operations, Offensive Operations
- Size: 5,200
- Part of: U.S. Special Operations Command (USSOCOM)
- Forward Operating Base: Constanţa, Romania
- Nickname: Task Force Viking
- Motto: "Concede Nothing"
- Engagements: 2003 Invasion of Iraq

Commanders
- Notable commanders: Colonel William C. Mayville Jr.

Combined Joint Special Operations Task Force – North (CJSOTF–N), also known as Task Force Viking, was the U.S. joint task force responsible for the northern front during the initial period of the 2003 U.S. invasion of Iraq (OIF Rotation I). It secured Kirkuk, Mosul, and the northern oil fields; prevented 13 Iraqi Army divisions from defending Baghdad or reinforcing defensive operations against American and British troops advancing in the south, and thwarted Turkish efforts to subvert Kurdistan.

Task Force Viking conducted artillery observer, direct action, special reconnaissance, and unconventional warfare missions in order to disrupt and fix Iraqi forces arrayed along the "Green Line", the nominal 1991 demarcation line between the Kurdish northern provinces of Iraq and the remainder controlled by Saddam Hussein. The original campaign for northern Iraq and the Task Force were ended on 12 May 2003.

== Background ==
CJSOTF–N was composed of the U.S. Army's Special Forces units, 173rd Airborne Brigade, 2-15 Field Artillery and 2-14th Infantry from 10th Mountain Division, 932nd Forward Surgical Team (FST), B Forward Support Company, 528th Support Battalion (A), A Company, 9th PSYOP Battalion, soldiers from the 142nd Military Intelligence Battalion, 300th MI Brigade, of the Utah Army National Guard; and, elements from the 96th and 404th Civil Affairs Battalions (Special Operations); the U.S. Air Force's 352nd Special Operations Group; the U.S. Marine Corps's 26th Marine Expeditionary Unit; and indigenous Kurdish Peshmerga. All U.S. units were initially prepositioned in Constanţa, Romania beginning in February 2003 except the 173rd based in Vicenza, Italy, and the 26th MEU based aboard the Iwo Jima Amphibious Ready Group in the Mediterranean Sea. The task force's mix of conventional and special operations personnel numbered approximately 5,200 and fell under the United States Special Operations Command Joint Operations Center (USSOCOM JOC). The Task Force's motto was "Concede Nothing."

Facing Task Force Viking were two divisions of the Iraqi Republican Guard, possibly including the sixth motorized division, two Mechanized infantry divisions, one armored division, eight infantry divisions and the Fedayeen Saddam militia. Amongst these units were the 2nd, 4th, 7th, 8th, 16th, and 38th Divisions. Task Force Viking also had to contend with Ansar Al Islam, Ansar Al Sunna, and Kadek/PKK irregulars and also with the dueling future political aspirations of the various Kurdish factions (Patriotic Union of Kurdistan & Kurdistan Democratic Party of Iraq), Turkomen (Iraqi Turkmen Front), Yazidis, and the Sunni Arab tribes.

Originally, the task force planned to infiltrate northern Iraq via Turkey. However, Turkey refused to grant permission for an invasion of Iraq from its soil or over its airspace. Coalition commanders instead undertook a complicated and roundabout infiltration via Jordanian airspace beginning the evening of 20 March 2003. This operation was known as "Ugly Baby". The "Ugly Baby" operation was the longest infiltration mission since World War II and the longest MC-130 Combat Talon II infiltration in history.

After much diplomatic maneuvering, Turkey finally allowed American overflights on 23 March.

This allowed Task Force Viking to expand to 50 individual Special Forces Operational Detachments-Alpha (ODAs). Reinforcing the ODAs on 26 March, the 173rd made a combat jump onto Bashur airfield, as part of Operation Northern Delay, 40 miles (64 km) north of the "Green Line". This was the largest airborne assault since World War II. The 173rd assumed the security mission of Bashur from 10th Group ODA's and Peshmerga, receiving the airborne insertion of 1st Infantry Division armor on 7 April, followed by the 26th Marine Expeditionary Unit.

A friendly fire incident near Pir Daoud on Sunday, 6 April 2003, killed 18 members of Task Force Viking and injured 45. An F-15 mistakenly dropped a bomb on the position of US Special Forces and Peshmerga troops instead of on the Iraqi tank 1 mile (1.6 km) away. One of the injured was Wajih Barzani, the brother of Masoud Barzani, leader of the Kurdistan Democratic Party (KDP) and later President of Iraqi Kurdistan.

Shortly after its 10 April 2003 liberation, the Turkish government began to covertly dispatch their own special forces troops to Kirkuk. Disguised as aid workers, they were to train and equip members of the Iraqi Turkmen Front to destabilize Kurdistan and provide Turkey a pretext to intervene with a large "Peace Keeping" force. Elements of the 173rd under the command of Colonel William C. Mayville Jr. identified and intercepted the Turkish soldiers, and escorted them back across the border with no shots being fired.

== TF Viking Milestones ==
- Operation Ugly Baby – 20-21 March 2003
- Operation Northern Delay – 26-31 March 2003
- Operation Viking Hammer – 28-30 March 2003
- Operation Northern Safari – 6-7 April 2003
- Kirkuk Liberation – 10 April 2003
- Mosul Liberation – 10 April 2003
- Tikrit Liberation – 13 April 2003

== TF Viking Memorial ==
The 1st Special Forces Command (Airborne) (Provisional) paid tribute to the Airmen, Marines, and Soldiers of Task Force Viking during a stone laying ceremony at the U.S. Army Special Operations Command Headquarters' Memorial Plaza on 30 June 2015. "Today we commemorate an event, which at the time, I don't think any of us knew would be as meaningful or as significant as it would turn out to be – which is often the case I've come to learn in these sorts of things," said Lt. Gen. Charles T. Cleveland, commanding general, USASOC, and Task Force Viking commander.
