= 528th Sustainment Brigade (United States) =

U.S. Army sustainment and special operations unit

528th Sustainment Brigade (Special Operations) (Airborne)
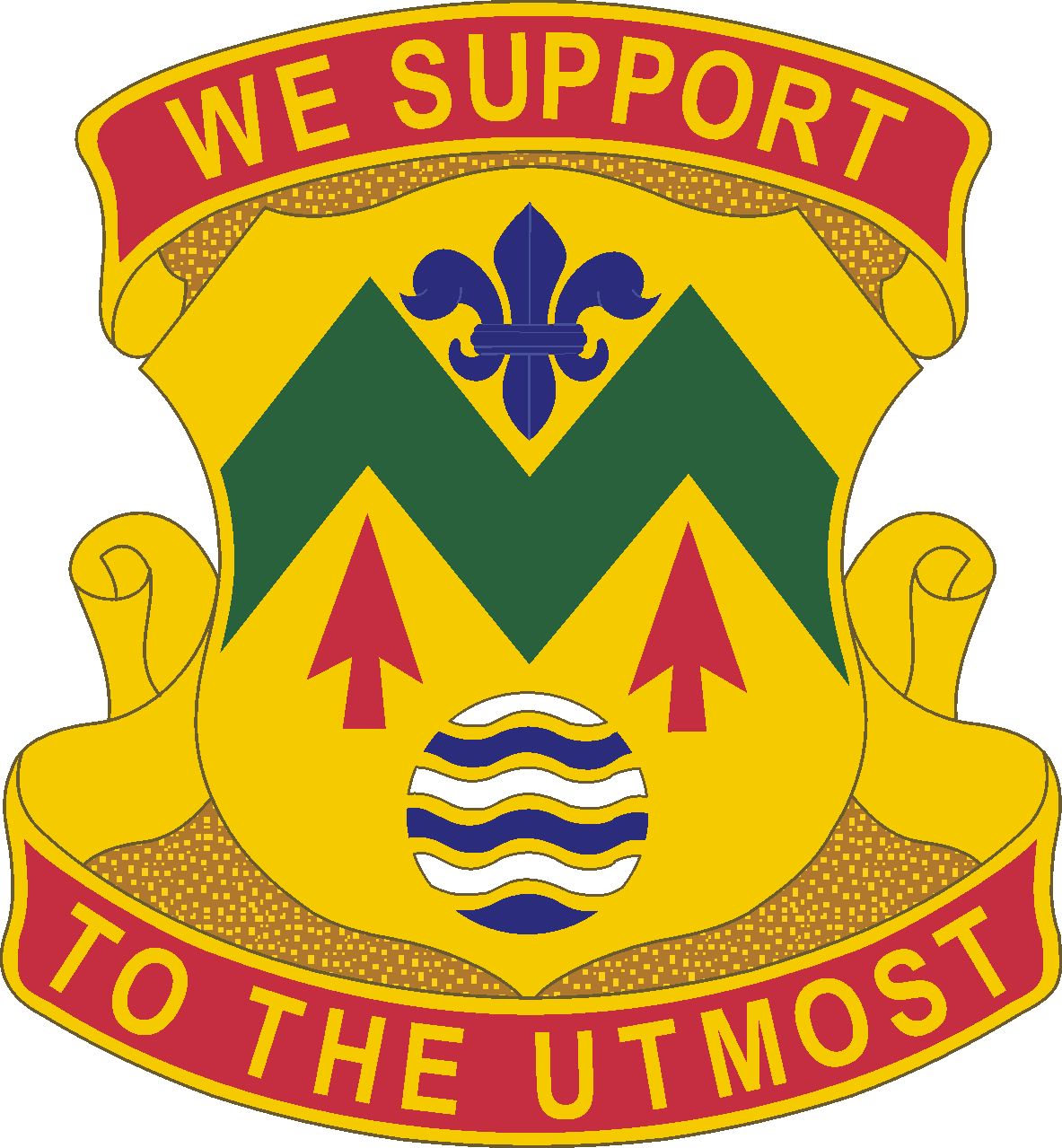
- 528th Sustainment Brigade's Distinctive Unit Insignia
- Active: 1 November 1995–present
- Country: United States
- Branch: United States Army
- Type: Special Operations Support
- Role: 528th SBSO(A)'s mission is to ensure sustainment, signal, military intelligence, and combat health service support Army special operations forces (ARSOF) around the globe.
- Size: Brigade
- Part of: 1st Special Forces Command (Airborne)
- Garrison/HQ: Fort Bragg, North Carolina
- Nickname: Sentinels
- Motto: "We Support to the Utmost"
- Decorations: Valorous Unit Award Meritorious Unit Commendation
- Website: Official website

Commanders
- Current commander: Colonel Joshua Johnson

Insignia
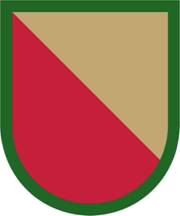
- Brigade beret flash

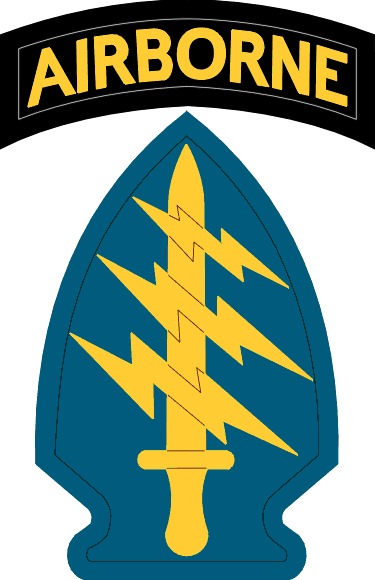
- 1st Special Forces Command (Airborne) shoulder sleeve insignia, worn by all subordinate units

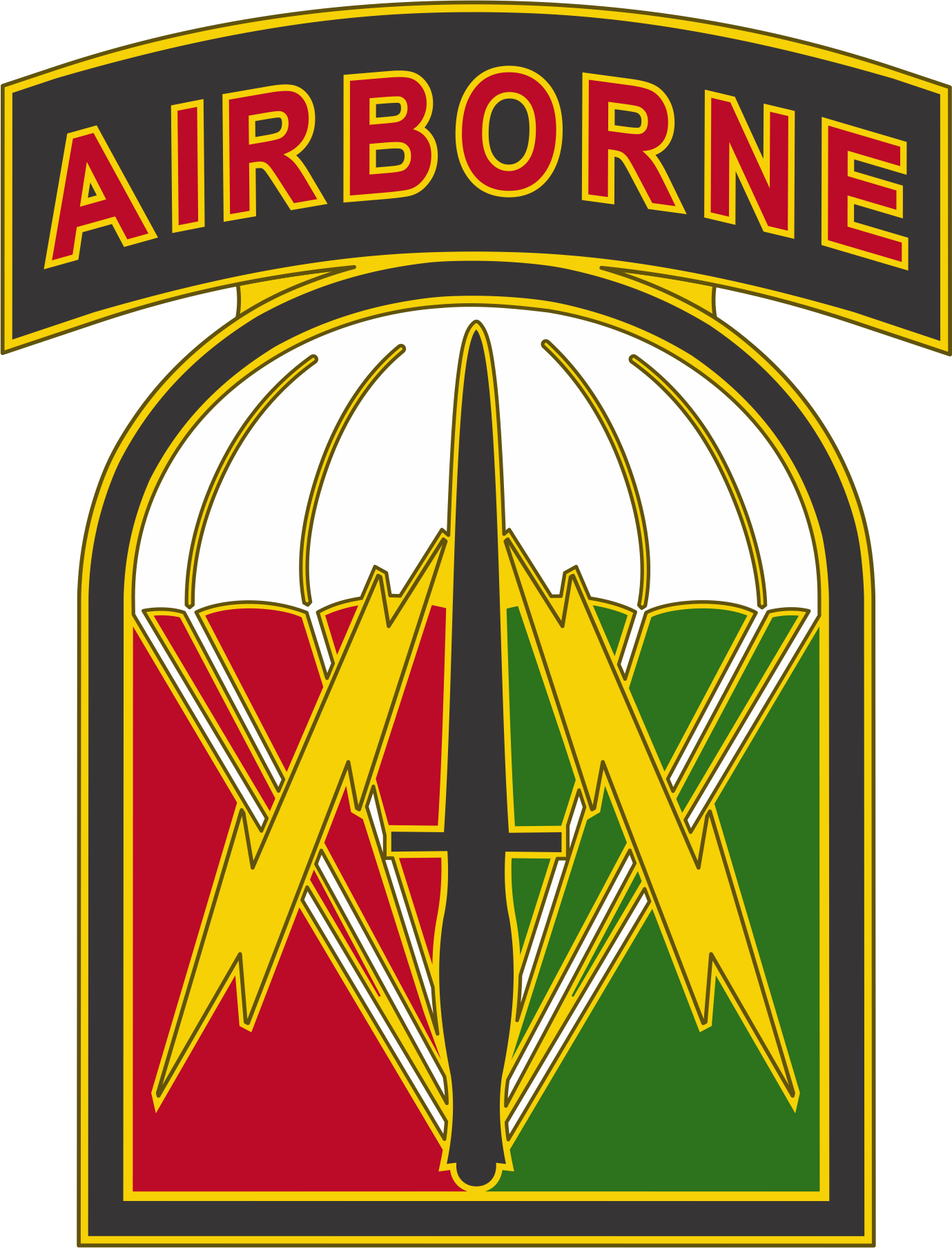
- Former combat service identification badges

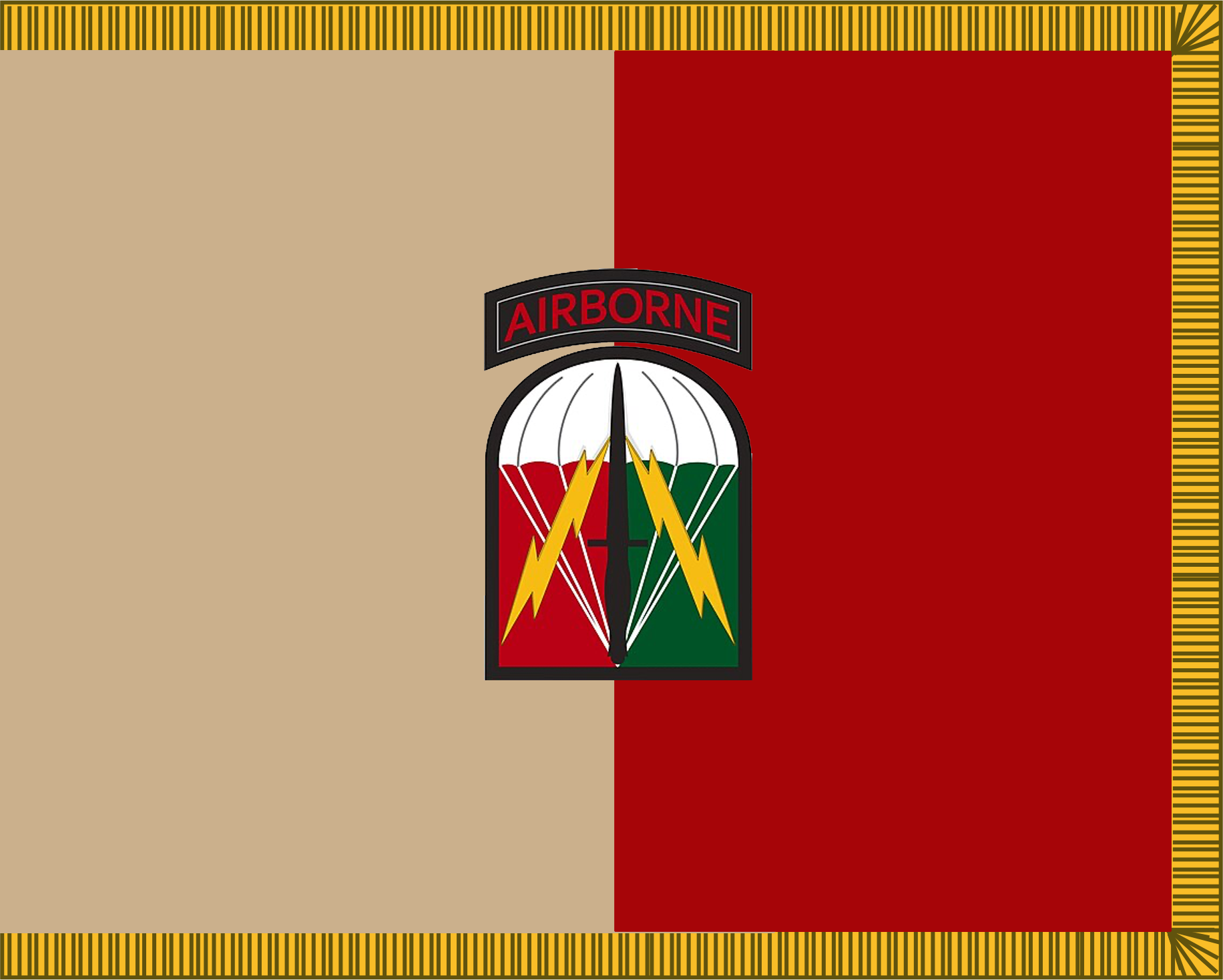
- 528th Sustainment Brigade Flag

The 528th Sustainment Brigade (Special Operations) (Airborne), 528th Sustainment Brigade (SO) (A), or 528th SB (SO) (A) was activated on 16 December 2008, as part of the overall United States Army Special Operations Forces logistics transformation. The brigade replaced the Special Operations Support Command (Airborne) (SOSCOM) as combat service support and combat health support unit for all Army Special Operations Command (USASOC) units under the 1st Special Forces Command (Airborne) (1st SFC).

Per the U.S. Army Field Manual No. 4-0, the 528th Sustainment Brigade (SO) (A) sets operational support conditions to enable Army Special Operations Forces (ARSOF) operations. Key tasks include providing tailored logistics management, limited aerial delivery, unique ARSOF surgical capability, signal, military intelligence and command and control of assigned, adjacent, and mission aligned elements. The 528th Sustainment Brigade (SO) (A) is organic to the operational employment of the 1st SFC (two-star operational HQ) and is considered part of the deployed force structure when an ARSOF led special operations JTF is employed. Serve as the lead component for support for 1st SFC with respect to conducting ARSOF logistics, medical, communications and military intelligence operations. The 528th Sustainment Brigade (SO) (A) primary purpose of fulfilling global operational requirements of emerging requirements.

== Doctrinal Mission ==
The 528th Sustainment Brigade (SO) (A) is designed to support special operations forces. It is a unique Army sustainment brigade because it maintains global situational awareness of deployed Army special operations forces logistics support structures. The 528th Sustainment Brigade (SO) (A) sets the operational-level logistics conditions to enable Army special operations forces missions. It is assigned to United States (U.S.) Army 1st SFC and focuses on operational to tactical sustainment support. During periods where only special operations forces are operating in a theater, support may be executed under the 528th Sustainment Brigade (SO) (A). ATP 3-05.40, Special Operations Sustainment, provides more details on special operations sustainment.

When deployed, the 528th Sustainment Brigade (SO) (A) acts as the logistics headquarters for a joint special operations task force. The 528th Sustainment Brigade (SO) (A) integrates Army special operations forces support requirements into the Army Service component command support plan and ensures a timely response to Army special operations forces requirements. The 528th Sustainment Brigade (SO) (A) may also control a CSSB in support of a conventional force expansion in the theater of operation until relieved by a conventional sustainment brigade.

== Organizational Evolution ==
The 528th Sustainment Brigade (SO) (A) and its subordinate battalions trace their lineage to WWII, but have taken various forms since that conflict. This section presents the organizational structure of select ARSOF support units over the past 75 years:

-1942 First Special Service Force (FSSF)
-1944 512th Airborne Signal Company
-1987 1st SOCOM

- 13th Support Battalion, later designated 528th Support Battalion
- 112th Signal Battalion

-1990 U.S. Special Forces Command
-1993 U.S. Army Special Operations Command
-2002 Special Operations Support Command
-2020 528th Sustainment Brigade

- Special Troops Battalion
- 112th Signal Battalion
- 389th Military Intelligence Battalion
- 528th Support Operations

== Organizational structure ==
The 528th Sustainment Brigade (SO) (A) consists of a brigade staff, a support operations unit, and three battalions: the Special Troops Battalion, the 112th Special Operations Signal Battalion, and the 389th Military Intelligence Battalion.

=== Special Troops Battalion ===
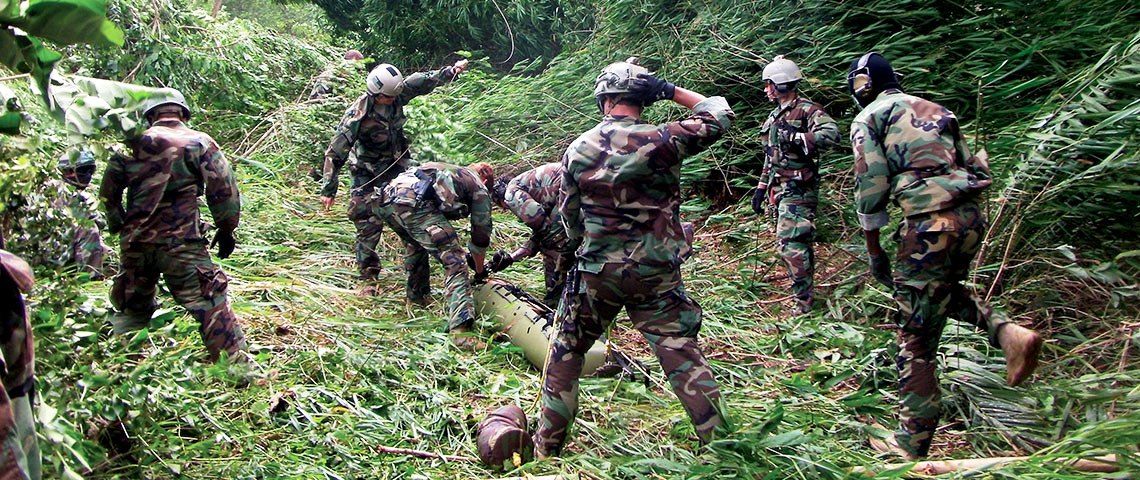
An ARST conducts jungle extraction training with 10th Special Forces Group (Airborne), circa 2013

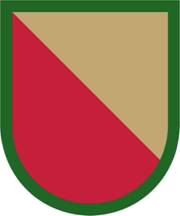
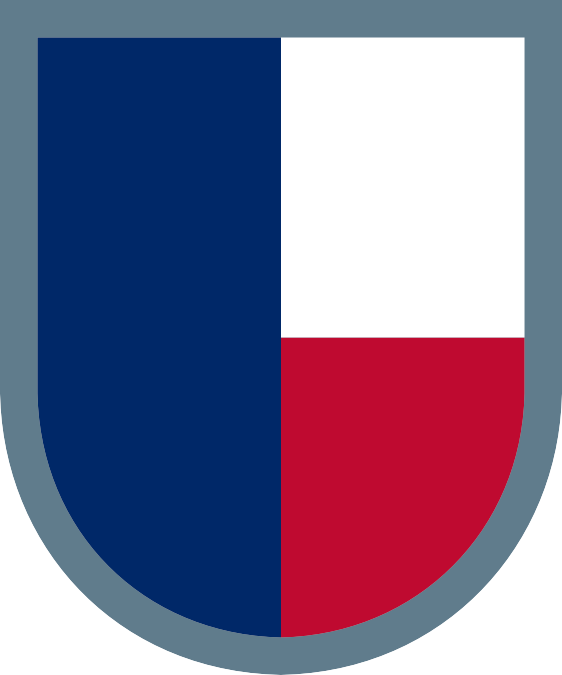

The Special Troops Battalion (formerly known as the 528th Support Battalion (A)) provides rapidly deployable combat service support and health service support to ARSOF and consists of a headquarters company with an organic rigger detachment, a special operations medical detachment with four Austere Resuscitative Surgical Teams (ARSTs)—formally known as Special Operations Resuscitation Teams (SORTs)—the 197th Special Troops Support Company from the Texas Army National Guard, and 1/528th Forward Support Company from the West Virginia Army National Guard.

=== 112th Special Operations Signal Battalion ===
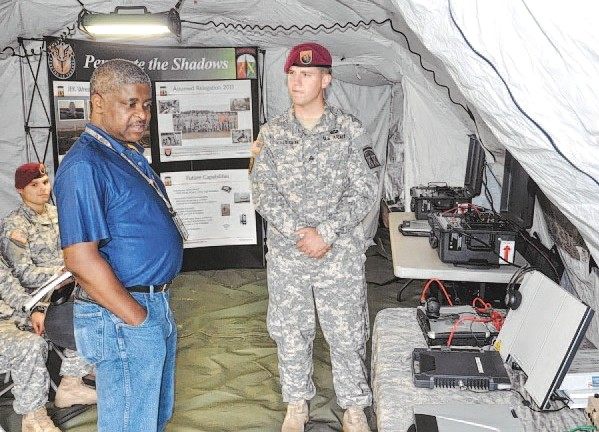
A Sergeant from the 112th Signal discusses the Special Operations Forces Deployable Node Light Kit with an instructor at Fort Gordon, 2013

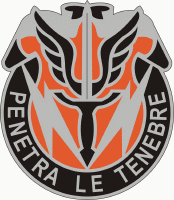

The 112th Special Operations Signal Battalion (A) is the Army's only special operation airborne signal unit. The 112th specializes in advanced communication while employing and developing innovative telecommunications technologies to provide both Army and Joint special operations task force commanders with secure and nonsecure voice, data and video services. The 112th's signals expertise allows ARSOF to "shoot, move and communicate" on a continuous basis. Signals soldiers assigned to 112th are airborne qualified and are taught to operate and maintain a vast array of unique and specialized communications equipment not normally used by their conventional counterparts. To meet the needs of ARSOF and SOCOM, the 112th can be deployable on a moment's notice with an authorized strength of five companies: a headquarters company, a Theater Signal Support Company with six geographically focused signal support detachments, and three general signal companies.

=== 389th Military Intelligence Battalion ===
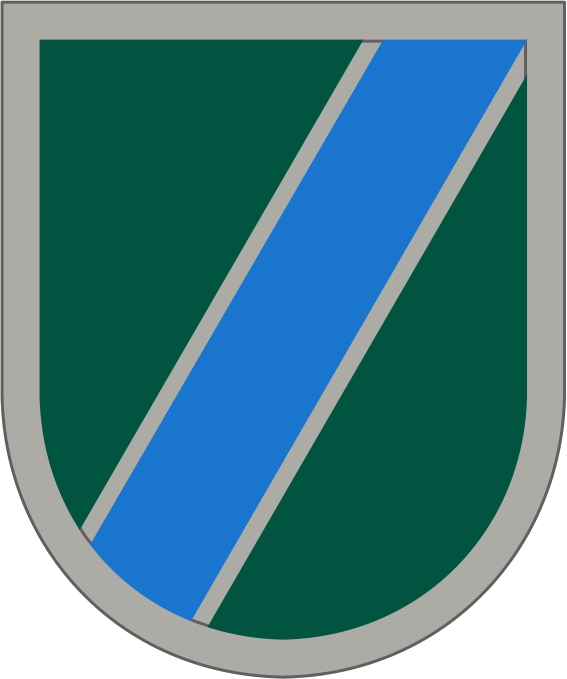

The 389th Military Intelligence Battalion (SO) (A) "conducts command and control of multi-disciplined intelligence operations in support of the 1st SFC, component subordinate units, and mission partners." On order, it deploys and conducts intelligence operations as part of a special operations joint task force leveraging the capabilities of its three organic companies: a headquarters company; an Analytical Support Company with a cytological support element and five geographically aligned regional support teams; a Mission Support Company with a Processing, Exploitation, and Dissemination (PED) detachment, a HUMINT and GEOINT detachment, and operations the Special Warfare SIGINT Course for the ARSOF community; and an additional PED detachment stationed at Fort Gordon.

From 2015 to mid-2019, the unit operated under the ad hoc name of 1st Special Forces Command Military Intelligence Battalion (A). To avoid being assigned the 'next available' number, the Department of the Army Force Management, U.S. Army Center of Military History, and USASOC History Office worked with battalion leadership to determine a unit designation that reflected a legacy of military intelligence support to ARSOF and carried forth the wartime honors of a past military intelligence unit. In July 2019, the 389th Military Intelligence Battalion (A) was activated and provides 1st SFC with a deployable, operational-level intelligence capability with the motto "Illuminate to Action!".

=== Support Operations ===
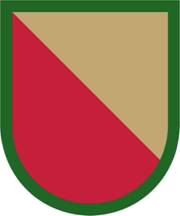

Support Operations embed in each regional theaters' staff to support planning and coordination with theater Army, Special Operations Command and Army Special Operations Command to ensure support during operations and training. As a theater Army staff member, these officers and non-commissioned officers' knowledge of theater-specific requirements and capabilities assist units in coordination with the theater. Support Operations consists of four detachments: current operations which manages five geographically aligned ARSOF liaison elements, a future operations detachment, a commodity managers detachment, and an ARSOF support operations element.

Brigade organizational charts
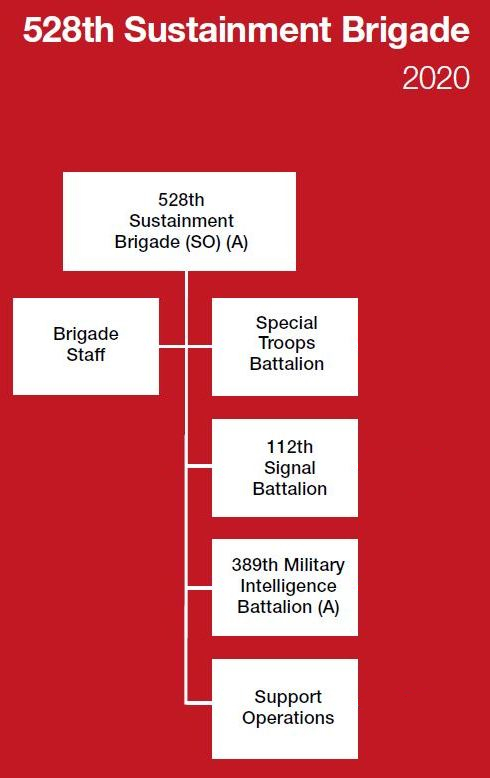
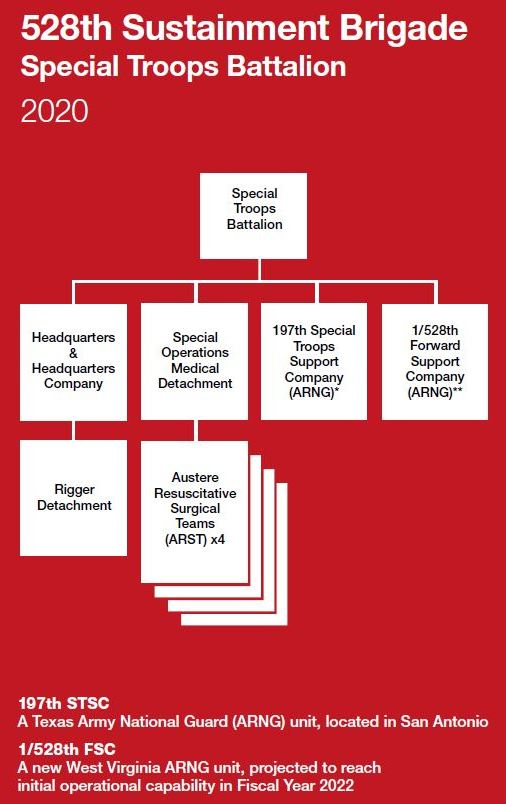
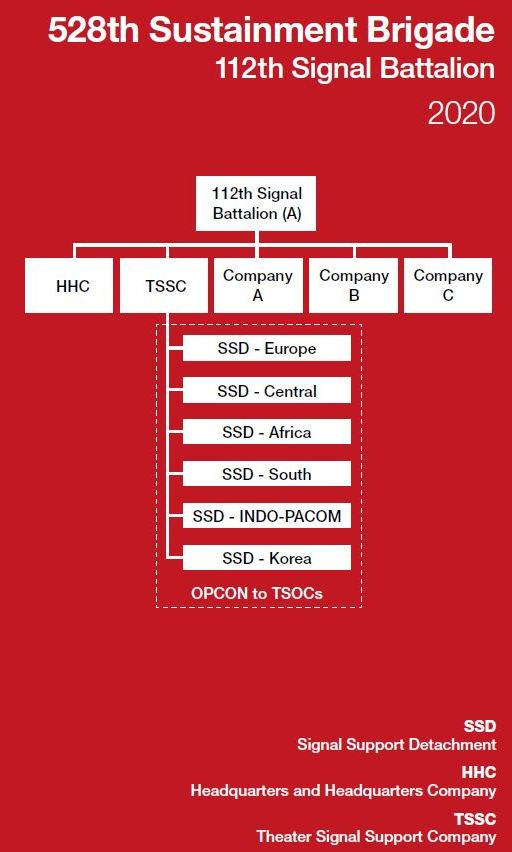
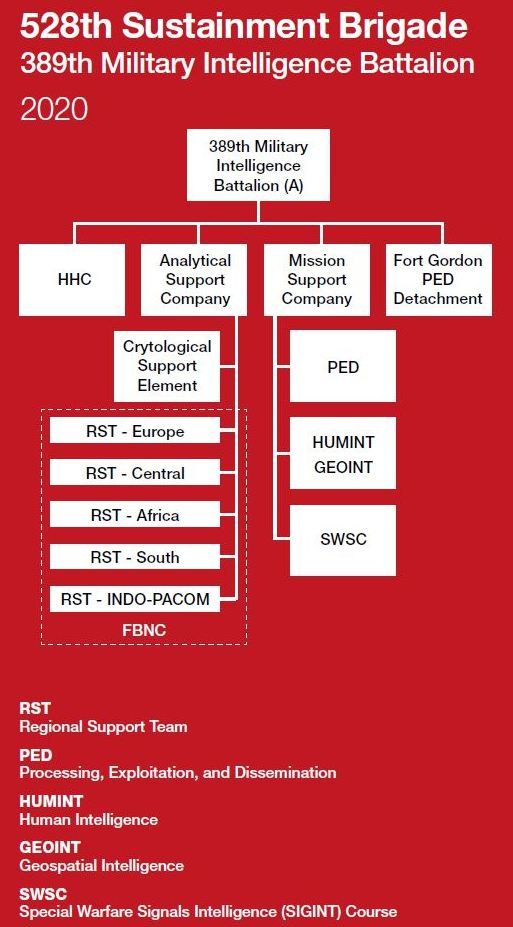
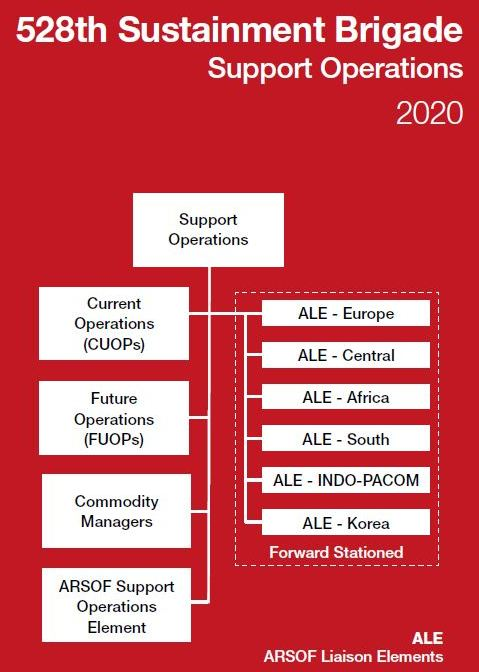
