= The Lost Battalion (1919 film) =

1919 film by Burton L. King

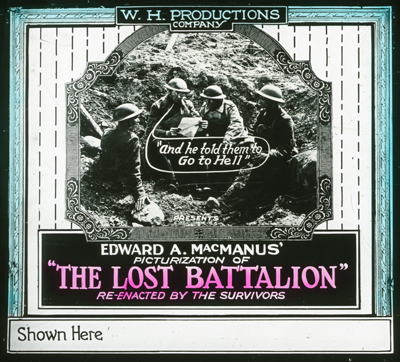
- Slide promoting the film
- Directed by: Burton L. King
- Written by: Charles A. Logue
- Produced by: Edward A. MacManus
- Cinematography: Arthur A. Cadwell
- Production company: MacManus Corporation
- Distributed by: W. H. Productions Company
- Release date: July 2, 1919
- Country: United States
- Language: Silent

The Lost Battalion is a 1919 American silent war film about units of the 77th Infantry Division (the "Lost Battalion") penetrating deep into the Argonne Forest of France during World War I. The film was directed by Burton L. King and features Major Charles W. Whittlesey and a number of actual soldiers from the 77th who portrayed themselves in the film. It was released July 2, 1919 in North America. The film was remade in 2001 by Russell Mulcahy.

== Plot ==
The Lost Battalion (1919)

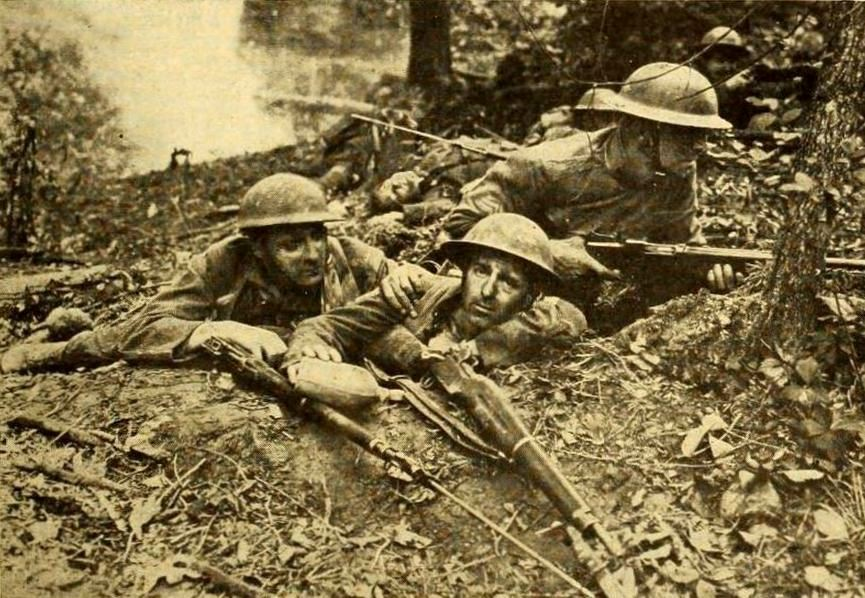
Still from The Lost Battalion, on page 1947 of the June 28, 1919 Moving Picture World. Men who fought with the 77th Infantry Division in France acted in the film.

The men of the 308th Infantry Regiment, part of Major General Robert Alexander's 77th Infantry Division, have been drafted from diverse ethnic, economic, and social groups in New York City. Two men are fighting Chinatown tongs, one is a burglar, another is a wealthy merchant's son in love with his father's stenographer, who dreams of becoming the greatest movie actress, another is a private in love with the merchant's ward, and finally there is "the Kicker," who finds fault with everything. After training in Yaphank and in France, the 463 men advance under the command of Lieutenant Colonel Charles W. Whittlesey into the "Pocket" of the Argonne Forest, to help break down the supposedly impregnable German defense. Cut off from Allied troops and supplies, and surrounded by the enemy, the battalion, nicknamed "The Lost Battalion," withstands six days without food or water. When the German commander asks for their surrender, Whittlesey replies, "Tell them to go to hell!" The Chinese rivals fight bravely side-by-side, while the burglar dies heroically. After their rescue, the survivors are given a parade in New York, and are reunited with their families and sweethearts.

== Cast ==
- Major General Robert Alexander – (Himself)
- Lieutenant Colonel Charles W. Whittlesey – (Himself)
- Major George McMurtry – (Himself)
- Captain William J. Cullen – (Himself)
- Lieutenant Arthur F. McKeogh – (Himself)
- Lieutenant Augustus Kaiser – (Himself)
- Private Abraham Krotoshinsky – (Himself)
- Helen Ferguson – (The Stenographer)
- Marion Coakley – (Nancy Crystal)
- Mrs. Stuart Robson – (The landlady)
- Blanche Davenport – (The mother)
- Lt. Jordan – (Himself)
- Bessie Learn – (The girl next door)
- Sidney D'Albrook – (The burglar)
- Gaston Glass – (Harry Merwin)
- Jack McLean – (The Kicker)
- William H. Tooker
- Stephen Grattan
- J. A. King
