= Cher Ami =

Homing pigeon used by the U.S. Army Signal Corps

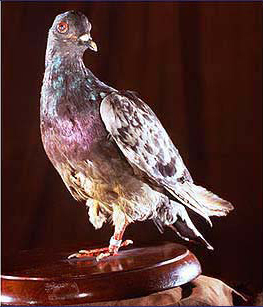
- The taxidermied body of Cher Ami on display at the Smithsonian Institution
- Born: 1918; Norfolk, England
- Died: June 13, 1919 (aged 1); Fort Monmouth, New Jersey, U.S.
- Burial place: Smithsonian Institution
- Military career
- Allegiance: United States
- Branch: United States Army
- Service years: 1918
- Unit: 77th Division
- Conflicts: World War I: Meuse–Argonne offensive
- Awards: Croix de Guerre; Animals in War & Peace Medal of Bravery
- Other work: Department of Service mascot

Cher Ami (French for "dear friend", in the masculine) was a male (Note: On May 10, 2021, Doctors Carla Dove and Robert Fleischer took samples of the preserved body of Cher Ami and sent them for DNA analysis. On June 30, 2021, results confirmed that Cher Ami was a cock (male).) homing pigeon known for his military service during World War I, especially the Meuse-Argonne offensive in October 1918. According to popular legend, he delivered a message alerting American forces to the location of the Lost Battalion, despite sustaining injuries such as being shot in the breast, losing his right leg and being blinded in his left eye.

== Background and early life ==
Homing pigeons have been used for millennia to carry messages due to their innate ability to navigate home. They were used extensively as messengers during World War I, with France, Germany, and the United Kingdom having established pigeon messenger services before World War I broke out. The United States Army experimented with pigeon messengers successfully in 1878, and unsuccessfully in 1916.

When they arrived in France, the advantages of homing pigeons were reported to Colonel Edgar Russel, General John Pershing's chief signal officer, by the British and French. At the request of General John Pershing, the U.S. Army Signal Corps' Pigeon Service was established in November 1917. Cher Ami was one of 600 English-bred birds donated to the Pigeon Service on May 20, 1918. The 600 birds arrived in Langres, France, on May 23, of which 245 were subsequently sent to the front. They were meant to be a communication method of last resort used by frontline troops. Messages would be written thrice on thin paper and placed in a canister attached to the bird. The pigeon would then fly back to its loft, where its message would be read.

It is unknown exactly when Cher Ami hatched, though it was likely in late March or early April 1918. Cher Ami's identification band is stamped with "NURP 18 EAD 615," meaning he was a "National Union Racing Pigeon" and born in 1918. EAD refers to the registered breeder's loft, and may suggest he hatched at the loft of E. A. Davidson in Norfolk, England.

== World War I service ==
After arriving at the Pigeon Service's headquarters, Cher Ami was one of 60 pigeons assigned to Mobile Loft No. 11, managed by Ernest Kockler. On September 21, the loft was relocated to Rampont, France in preparation for the Meuse-Argonne Offensive. The birds of Mobile Loft No. 11 supported the 77th Infantry Division into and through the Argonne Forest.

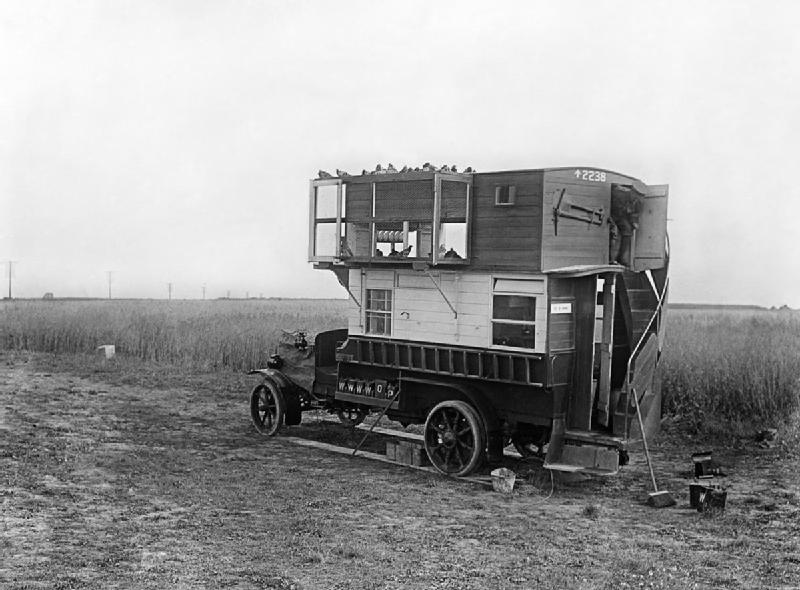
A mobile pigeon loft fashioned from an old bus during World War I.

On October 2, 1918, the first and second battalions of the 77th Infantry Division, commanded by Major Charles W. Whittlesey and Captain George G. McMurtry, respectively, and two companies of the 306th Machine Gun Battalion entered the forest. Eight pigeons were brought with the group. The group reached the Charlevaux Ravine, where they stopped. The next day, they were joined by Company K of the 307th Infantry Regiment, commanded by Captain Nelson M. Holderman. All together, they totaled 554 men, though estimates vary. Around 9:00 AM, two pigeons were sent out requesting artillery support, one of which contained incorrect coordinates. Shortly after, his runners were completely cut off and they were trapped in the ravine. Two more pigeons were sent explaining the situation. They had no more rations, little medical supplies and lost a quarter of their force as casualties.

On the morning of October 4, Whittlesey sent another pigeon requesting aid. Soon after, the Germans began harassing them with mortars and gunfire, and the sixth pigeon was dispatched. At 2:30, the 305th Field Artillery Regiment began firing on a slope near their location, and they were soon hit by friendly fire. The artillery batteries supporting Whittlesey's men attempted to provide a "barrage of protection" for Whittlesey's men on the northern slope of the Charlevaux Ravine, but believed Whittlesey was on the southern slope of the ravine, resulting in a barrage inadvertently targeting the battalion. Around 3:00, when the shelling continued, Whittlesey wrote a note reading,

We are along the road paralell [sic] 276.4. Our artillery is dropping a barrage directly on us. For heavens sake stop it.

He gave the note to Private Omer Richards, who placed it in a capsule and took one of two remaining pigeons from his pigeon basket. A nearby shell surprised the two, and the pigeon escaped. Richards then took the last pigeon, purportedly Cher Ami, tied the message to his right leg, and released it. Cher Ami landed a short distance away on a branch. The Americans attempted to shoo the bird on, but he did not continue on until Richards climbed the tree and shook the branch. As Cher Ami tried to fly back home, the Germans saw him rising out of the brush and opened fire. He was shot down but managed to take flight again. He arrived back at his loft at division headquarters 25 miles (40 km) to the rear in just 25 minutes, about 5 minutes after the shelling had ceased. Only 194 men were able to walk out of the forest by the time they were rescued, and they became known as the Lost Battalion. Cher Ami became the hero of the 77th Infantry Division. Army medics worked to save his life. When he recovered enough to travel, the now one-legged bird was put on a boat to the United States, with General John J. Pershing seeing him off.

=== Injuries and veracity ===
Reports of Cher Ami's injuries vary. Some reports state that he lost an eye, though photographs from April 1919 show no evidence of this. A film made in 1919, The Lost Battalion, which mentions Cher Ami as losing an eye and leg, may have helped perpetuate reports of an eye wound. An October 1918 report by Captain David C. Buscall of the Pigeon Service mentions a pigeon with a loft at Rampont, travelling 25 miles (40 km), who had been shot in the breast, with a leg amputated and the message hanging only by a ligament, possibly referring to Cher Ami. In 1919 he revises the story to mention a pigeon as arriving in 25 minutes from Grandpré on October 27, shot in the chest and with a leg amputated and the message hanging by a ligament. Which pigeon this refers to is unclear, though Cher Ami was sometimes credited with this as well as the Lost Battalion action. According to Signal Corps Captain C.C. Hungerford, "Whether ‘Cher Ami’ did or did not carry the famous message from the Lost Battalion, the records show that he did return to his loft with a message dangling from the ligaments of the leg that had been ampitated [sic] by rifle or shell shot. He was shot through the breast and it was from effect of this wound that he died."

The first print mention of "Cher Ami", in 1919 for a caption of a photo, made no mention of the Lost Battalion action. Instead, it described Cher Ami as delivering twelve messages from Verdun to Rampont, covering the 30 kilometers in 24 minutes on average. It noted that on the bird's final flight, it flew from Grandpré to Rampont, covering the 25 miles (40 km) in 25 minutes, shot in the breast and a leg amputated, with the message handing by a ligament. Charlevaux Ravine, where the Lost Battalion was trapped, is 17 miles (27 km) from Rampont.

According to Frank A. Blazich Jr., the curator of modern military history at the Smithsonian Institution’s National Museum of American History, where Cher Ami's body is located, "There is nothing conclusive linking the pigeon to the actions of the Lost Battalion. Cher Ami did survive severe wounds transporting a message, but exactly where and when are uncertain. The U.S. Army chose to link Cher Ami with the Lost Battalion’s story to promote the contributions of the Signal Corps’ Pigeon Service." He further writes,

Several scenarios emerge from the surviving evidence. According to the official Signal Corps record, Cher Ami was wounded on 21 or 27 October flying from Grandpré. If Cher Ami flew on 4 October supporting the Lost Battalion, the bird did not receive any wounds, certainly not the loss of a leg or a severe wound to the chest. In his account of the Lost Battalion, historian Alan D. Gaff accepts Cher Ami as the bird who brought out Whittlesey’s last message, but being wounded on 27 October. With the town and hills fully secure by the early morning of 27 October, however, the afternoon of 21 October is the more plausible date of wounding. As is the popular convention though, Cher Ami flew in support of the Lost Battalion, receiving grievous wounds on 4 October and did not fly again. Thus, the actions of a different pigeon, flying from Grandpré, have been credited to Cher Ami. Another possibility is that Cher Ami was not involved in either incident, but nonetheless was credited with both.

== Retirement ==
On April 16, 1919, Cher Ami arrived in the United States aboard the ship Ohioan, staying in Captain John L. Carney's cabin. When he disembarked, Carney made some statements to the press, which are "the most direct origin of the Cher Ami legend", crediting the rescue of the Lost Battalion to Cher Ami. Carney had likely read the summary of Cher Ami's combat actions, which described his actions at Grandpré and made no mention of the Lost Battalion, and may have merged it with a separate paragraph from Buscall describing the pigeon from the Lost Battalion. The story of Cher Ami was widely spread through the reporters, along with more dubious details and various stories of his actions. Contrary to various news reports and the 1919 film The Lost Battalion, Cher Ami did not receive a Distinguished Service Cross from Pershing. Carney attended numerous press events with Cher Ami, after which he was housed at a loft in Potomac Park in Washington, D.C..

== Death and legacy ==
Cher Ami died at Fort Monmouth, New Jersey, on June 13, 1919, from the wounds he received in battle. Following his death, the U.S. Army Signal Corps donated his remains to the Smithsonian Institution. Taxidermist Nelson R. Wood at the National Museum of Natural History prepared Cher Ami for display.

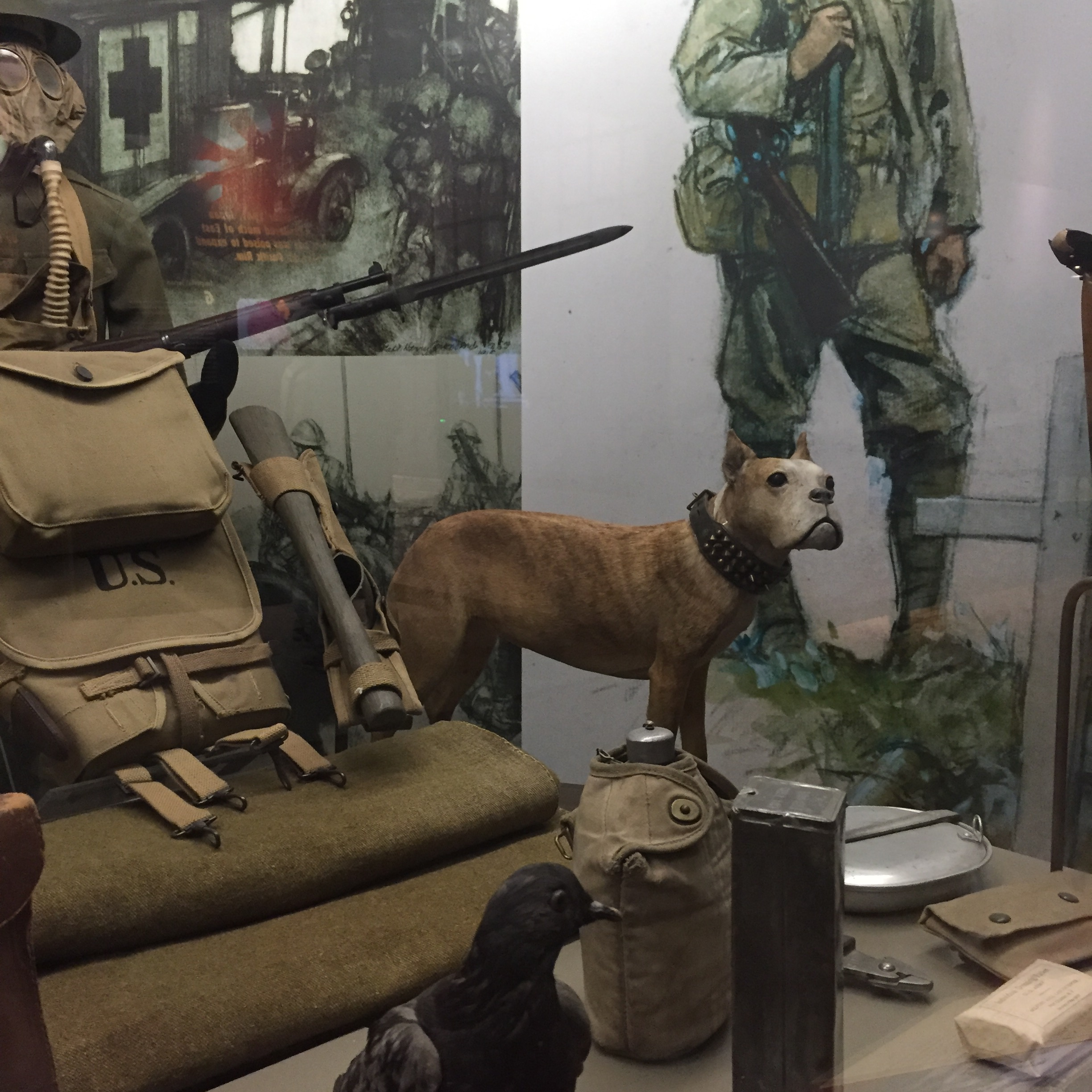
Cher Ami and Sgt. Stubby on display at the National Museum of American History.

When the Smithsonian requested information about Cher Ami, the Signal Corps reported they could not find any war record of Cher Ami being the pigeon "which carried the message from The Lost Battalion.", though they noted the records did mention that Cher Ami had been shot in the breast, with a leg amputated and the message hanging by the ligaments. Listing the known details of the bird, the Army, without explanation, described Cher Ami as "he" and the Smithsonian's label reflected the bird's sex as a cock bird.

In 2021, the National Museum of American History, together with the Smithsonian's National Zoo, had DNA samples from Cher Ami analyzed which concluded the bird is a cock bird.

Since 1921, Cher Ami has been on display at the Smithsonian Institution, then the United States National Museum. Today, he is on display in the National Museum of American History exhibit "The Price of Freedom: Americans at War."

== Awards ==
The pigeon was awarded the Croix de Guerre Medal with a palm Oak Leaf Cluster for his heroic service in delivering 12 important messages in Verdun and was later inducted into the Racing Pigeon Hall of Fame in 1931. He also received a gold medal from the Organized Bodies of American Racing Pigeon Fanciers in recognition of his service during World War I.

In November 2019, he became the second recipient of the Animals in War & Peace Medal of Bravery, bestowed posthumously at a ceremony on Capitol Hill in Washington, D.C.

== In popular culture ==
=== Books, essays, and short stories ===
- "Notre Cher Ami: The Enduring Myth and Memory of a Humble Pigeon," an academic article by Frank A. Blazich Jr. in The Journal of Military History
- Cher Ami and Major Whittlesey, a novel by Kathleen Rooney
- Cher Ami: The Story of a Carrier Pigeon, a children's book by Marion Cothren, published in 1934
- "Cher Ami", a poem by Harry Webb Farrington
- Dear Miss Kopp by Amy Stewart, the sixth book in the Kopp Sisters series, features a fictionalized account of Cher Ami's exploits
- Finding the Lost Battalion - Beyond the Rumors, Myths and Legends of America's Famous WWI Epic by Robert J. Laplander
- "Cher Ami" a short story by Heather Rounds
- "Viva Cuba Pigeon" a short story by Susannah Rodríguez Drissi
- The Ruby Notebook by Laura Resau
- "War Pigs", an essay in the collection Animals Strike Curious Poses by Elena Passarello
- The story is discussed in "Nexus: A Brief History of Information Networks from the Stone Age to AI" by Yuval Noah Harari, (Fern Press, 2024), ISBN 978-1911717089, pp. 3-4, 21-22

=== Film and TV ===
- The Lost Battalion (1919 film), a 1919 silent film, includes the living Cher Ami hopping on one leg. This film also includes many of the soldiers playing themselves, including Lt. Col. Charles Whittlesey. The entire film is available on YouTube.
- Cher Ami, a 2008 Spanish film directed by Miquel Pujol and produced by Accio Studios, also known as Flying Heroes or The Aviators.
- Flying Home, 2014 a romantic drama film, starring Jamie Dornan features the story of Cher Ami's heroic feat.
- Cher Ami is mentioned in season 3, episode 11 of White Collar, first aired 2011.
- The Lost Battalion, a 2001 war film about the Meuse-Argonne Offensive of 1918, depicting Cher Ami being sent off with the important message.
- A reference to Cher Ami is made in the 2024 Netflix series The Gentlemen.

== See also ==
- List of individual birds
