= Pigeoneer (United States Navy) =

Pigeoneer, or Pigeon Trainer was a rating in the United States Navy which emerged in the early twentieth century. Pigeoneers were charged with training pigeons to carry messages, as well as feeding and caring for the pigeons. The rating's necessity diminished with the emergence of radio communication; however, the rating remained in the United States Navy until 1961 to provide an emergency communication system. The rating was designated as a Specialist X

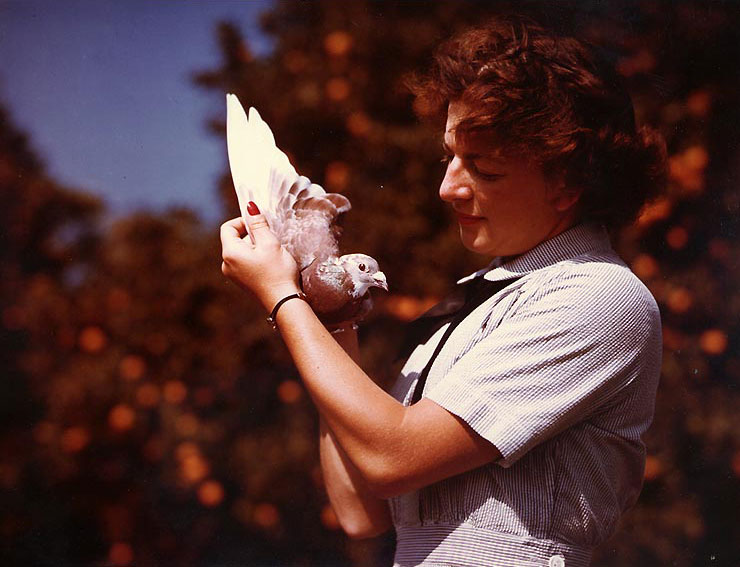
Pigeon Trainer

== History ==
The use of pigeons as a communication medium goes back centuries. In fact, the use of homing pigeons can be traced all the way back to ancient Egypt. Due to the difficult nature of tracing a pigeon's origin and a pigeon's innate ability to navigate, pigeons became widely adopted in many armed services as a means of communication. In World War I, pigeons were used in conjunction with radio and telegraph messages. The Germans even tried affixing a small camera to pigeons for aerial surveillance. The British used pigeons in World War II by dropping spy kits into France for the purpose of enabling citizens to report on German military activities. The kit included paper and a single pigeon and instructions for affixing the message onto the pigeon. The ancient Romans used pigeons to inform chariot owners of the results of chariot races.

== Duties of naval pigeon trainers ==
Pigeon trainers conducted various administrative and operational duties. Pigeon trainers were required to construct and maintain immaculately clean pigeon lofts. Upon arrival of a new shipment of birds, pigeon trainers sorted strong, healthy birds from sickly ones. Healthy birds were placed into the lofts, while sickly birds remained under isolate care until they regained their health. Pigeon trainers maintained a strict feeding routine for their birds, feeding the birds as much as they could eat in ten minute increments twice a day. Birds were fed only in the lofts. Due care was taken that no extra food remained in the loft for cleanliness reasons, and birds were never to be fed before a flight. Trainers also maintained a strict confinement schedule (4–6 days) depending on the birds' age. After confinement, birds were slowly let free for flight and training periods. All flight periods were meticulously logged by the trainers. Trainers banded their birds according to a navy-provided serialization scheme based on the birds home base.

== Cher Ami ==
The United States Army also utilized carrier pigeons, creating a pigeon corp in 1917. During World War I, one bird, Cher Ami, delivered twelve mission essential messages in France. Cher Ami was shot down during the mission, which resulted in his being blinded in one eye, wounded in the chest, and his leg being so wounded that it dangled by a tendon. Cher Ami died later due to complications from his injuries. His stuffed remains can now be viewed at the National Museum of American History. Cher Ami was awarded the Croix de Guerre and was also inducted into the Racing Pigeon Hall of Fame.
