= 308th Infantry Regiment =

US infantry regiment during the First World War

- Active: 1917–1919; 1921–1952
- Country: United States
- Branch: U.S. Army
- Role: Infantry
- Size: Regiment
- Motto: Toujours en avant (Ever Forward)
- Battle honours: World War I

Commanders
- Notable commanders: Major Charles W. Whittlesey

The 308th Infantry Regiment was a unit in the United States Army during World War I as a part of the 77th Infantry Division in Europe. Regimental designation is used only in historical tradition.

== World War I ==
The War Department authorized the formation of the regiment 5 August 1917, assigning it to the 154th Infantry Brigade of the 77th Infantry Division. It was organized at Camp Upton in Yaphank, New York in September 1917 and was composed of men drafted from throughout the greater New York City area. The regiment was initially commanded by Colonel Nathan K. Averill, a veteran of the Cuban War and faculty member at West Point. He would later be removed from command and succeeded by Colonel John R.R. Hannay. On 4 February 1918 the 308th was given the honor of being the first National Army regiment to receive its new regimental colors and was paraded through New York City in celebration.

The Division's two brigades embarked on 6 April for Europe aboard the Lapland, Cretic, and Justicia, arriving nearly two weeks later on 19 April. Upon reaching Europe, the 77th Division was assigned to the British command where it trained with the British army until early June 1918. Following the completion of this additional training, the regiment was moved up to the front in the Baccarat Sector, specifically the town of Badonviller. In doing so, they became some of the first units of the National Army to take front line positions. The regiment remained there until the end of August, resulting in losses equal to nearly one third of its strength. It was then moved to the Vesle front in the area near Fismes. The extensive losses were replaced by recruits from the American West, some still largely untrained. These recruits represented a very different side of America compared to the New Yorkers who had originally staffed the regiment, the majority of whom were foreign born or of wildly different ancestry. In early September, the regiment was moved to the Argonne Forest to participate in the Oise-Aisne campaign.

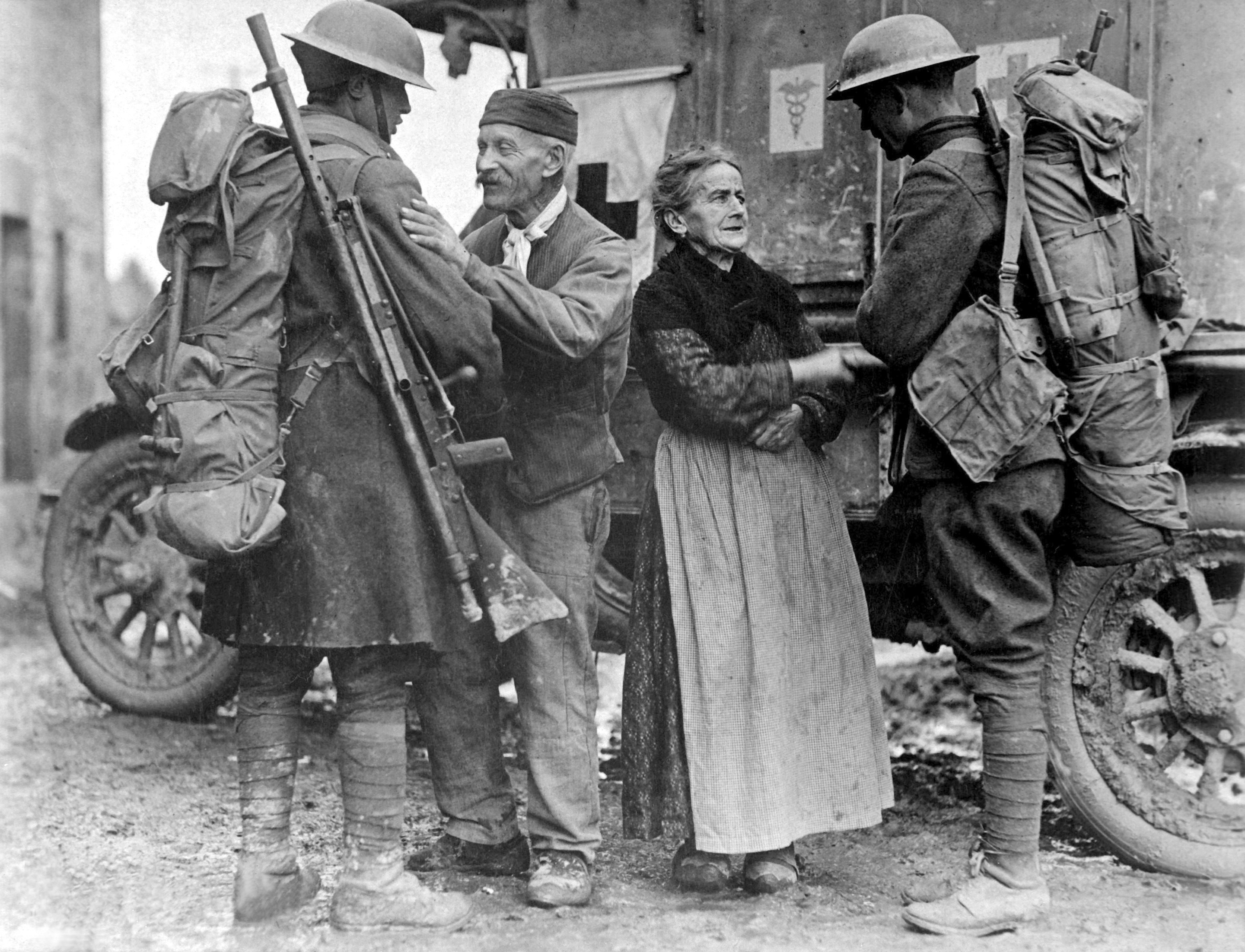
An old French couple, M. and Mme. Baloux of Brieulles-sur-Bar, France, under German occupation for four years, greeting soldiers of the 308th and 166th Infantry upon their arrival during the American advance.

At the end of the same month, it was ordered to advance in the Argonne as part of the Meuse-Argonne Offensive. Told to "push forward without regard to flanks", the 1st and 2nd Battalions of the regiment, along with one company from the 307th Infantry Regiment and two companies of the 306th Machine Gun Battalion, penetrated a gap in the German lines on 2 October and advanced to a ravine at Charlevaux Mill. German defenses checked the progress of the remainder of the 77th Division, however, leaving the advancing soldiers in an exposed position. That night, German troops reoccupied the gap, encircling the two battalions and trapping them behind enemy lines. These battalions, along with the other three companies, were besieged in the ravine for five days, from 3 October to 7 October, before the remainder of the Division were able to break through to relieve them. The events of these five days came to be known as the "Lost Battalion". German attacks hounded this pocket of soldiers nearly continuously for all five days and the depletion of food, water, and medical supplies only increased the soldiers' suffering. Of the nearly 600 soldiers who originally composed the "Lost Battalion" roughly 400 were killed or wounded in the course of their ordeal and the remainder were severely weakened after days surviving on little to no food or water. Following the relief of the "Lost Battalion", the Regiment continued forward and, by 16 October, had pushed through the Argonne with the rest of the 77th Division and participated in securing towns on the Aire River. It was then relieved and withdrawn to rest and reorganized before being called up for the final offensive to the Meuse in November.

Following the conclusion of the war on 11 November 1918, the regiment continued training exercises in France until 19 April 1919, at which point they embarked for New York aboard the SS America. Demobilization for the regiment began on 9 May 1919 in Camp Upton.

=== Military honors ===
Five members of the regiment were awarded the Medal of Honor for their service during the First World War. The first was awarded to Captain Louis Wardlaw Miles for actions on the Aisne during September. Three of these men, Major Charles W. Whittlesey, Captain Nelson Holderman, and Captain George G. McMurtry, were recognized for their actions during the "Lost Battalion" period while in command of the units trapped in the ravine. The last man was First Sergeant Benjamin Kaufman.

Additionally, seventy-five members of the regiment were awarded the Distinguished Service Cross and a further two the Croix de Guerre.

== Post-World War I ==
The regiment was reconstituted 24 June 1921 as a part of the Organized Reserve and assigned to the 77th Division once again. The regiment was initiated on 6 August 1921 with regimental headquarters at Bronx, New York. The 1st Battalion was organized at Bronx, the 2nd Battalion at Yonkers, New York, and the 3rd Battalion at Poughkeepsie, New York. The regiment conducted summer training most years with the 16th and 18th Infantry Regiments at Camp Dix, New Jersey, or Fort Slocum, New York, and some years with the 26th Infantry Regiment at Plattsburg Barracks, New York. It also conducted infantry Citizens Military Training Camps some years at Camp Dix and Plattsburg Barracks as an alternate form of summer training. The regiment typically held inactive training period meetings at the auditorium of the New York Bar Association in New York City. The primary ROTC feeder schools for new Reserve lieutenants were the College of the City of New York and New York University.

Following United States entry into the Second World War, Organized Reserve infantry divisions were reorganized on paper from "square" to "triangular" divisions preparatory to their call to active duty. The 308th Infantry Regiment was relieved from the 77th Division, withdrawn from the Organized Reserve, and allotted to the Army of the United States on 30 January 1942. On 5 May 1942, it was assigned to the 107th Infantry Division, a division planned to be manned with African American troops, but that unit was never activated and the regiment remained inactive until it was officially disbanded on 14 March 1952.
