= Archie A. Peck =

United States Army soldier

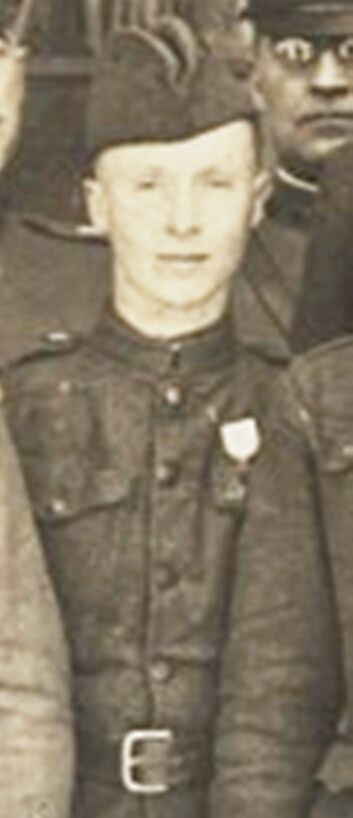
- Medal of Honor recipient
- Born: November 22, 1894; Tyrone, New York
- Died: September 15, 1978 (aged 83)
- Burial place: Evergreen Cemetery Sinclairville, New York
- Military career
- Allegiance: United States of America
- Branch: United States Army
- Rank: Private
- Service number: 1704658
- Units: Company A, 307th Infantry, 77th Division
- Conflicts: World War I: Meuse–Argonne offensive; The Lost Battalion
- Awards: Medal of Honor

Archie A. Peck (November 22, 1894 – September 15, 1978) was a soldier in the United States Army who received the Medal of Honor for his actions during World War I. While serving as an infantryman in the U.S. 77th Division during the Meuse–Argonne offensive, his unit found itself surrounded in the German lines. The unit would subsequently gain the moniker "The Lost Battalion" as a result of this incident. This was the bloodiest battle of the war involving U.S. troops. Private Peck acted gallantly while surrounded, saving two wounded men under machine gun fire.

== Biography ==
Peck was born in Tyrone, New York on November 22, 1894, and died September 15, 1978. He is buried in Evergreen Cemetery Sinclairville, New York.

== Medal of Honor Citation ==
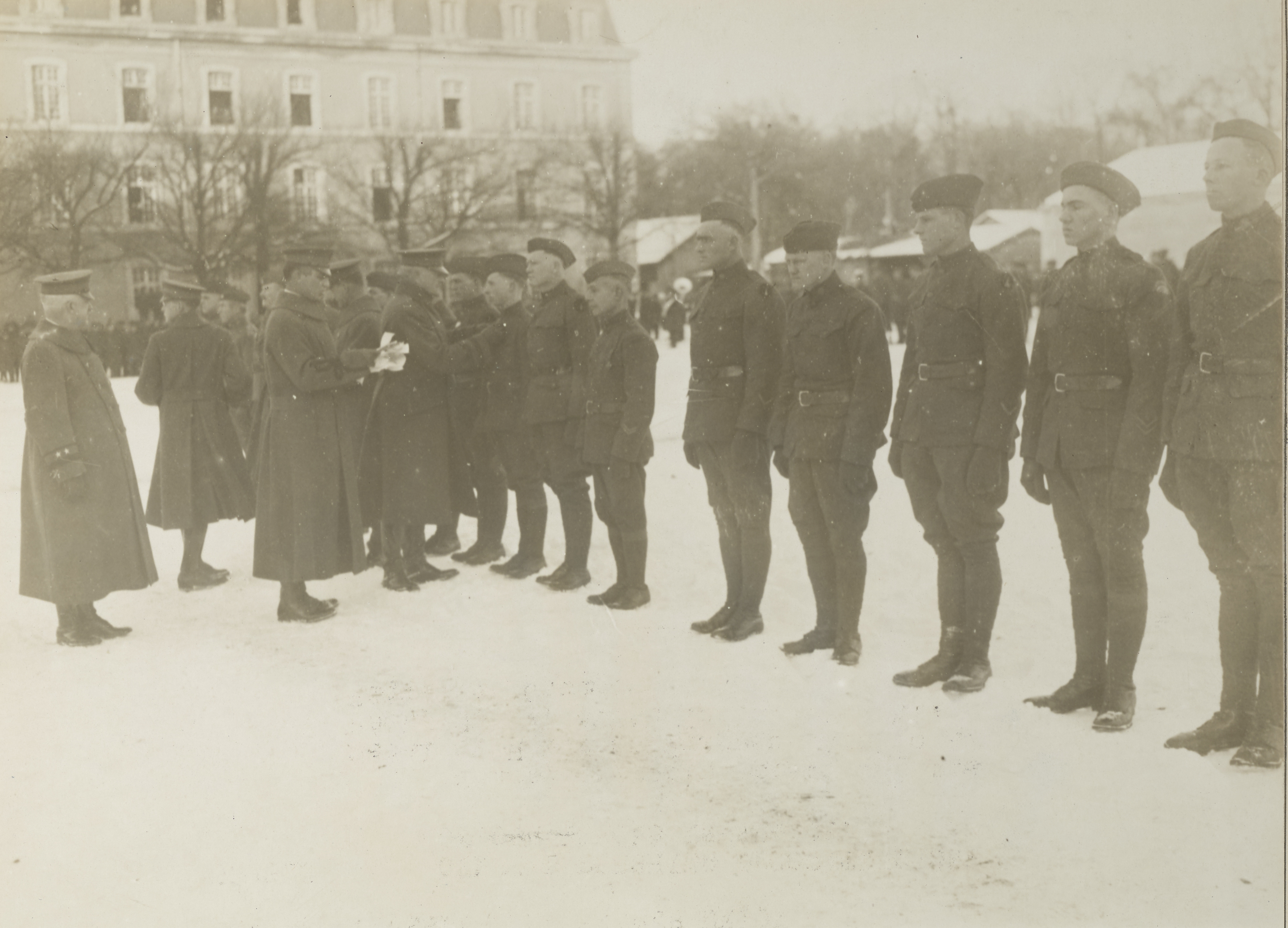
General John J. Pershing presenting the Medal of Honor to Sergeant Archie A. Peck of Company A, 307th Infantry, 77th Division, outside Pershing's headquarters at Chaumont, France, February 1919.

Rank and organization: Private, U.S. Army, Company A, 307th Infantry, 77th Division. Place and date: In the Argonne Forest, France, 6 October 1918. Entered service at: Hornell, N.Y. Birth: November 22, 1894; Tyrone, N.Y. General Orders: War Department, General Orders No. 16, January 22, 1919.

Citation:

For conspicuous gallantry and intrepidity above and beyond the call of duty in action with the enemy in the Argonne Forest, France, on October 6, 1918. While engaged with two other soldiers on patrol duty, Private Peck and his comrades were subjected to the direct fire of an enemy machine gun, at which time both his companions were wounded. Returning to his company, he obtained another soldier to accompany him to assist in bringing in the wounded men. His assistant was killed in the exploit, but he continued on, twice returning safely bringing in both men, being under terrific machinegun fire during the entire Journey.

== Military Awards ==
Peck's military decorations and awards include:

| 1st row | Medal of Honor | World War I Victory Medal w/three bronze service stars to denote credit for the Oise-Aisne, Meuse-Argonne and Defensive Sector battle clasps. | Médaille militaire (French Republic) |
| 2nd row | Croix de guerre 1914–1918 w/bronze palm (French Republic) | Croce al Merito di Guerra (Italy) | Medal for Military Bravery (Kingdom of Montenegro) |

== See also ==
- List of Medal of Honor recipients
- List of Medal of Honor recipients for World War I
