= Abraham Krotoshinsky =

United States Army soldier

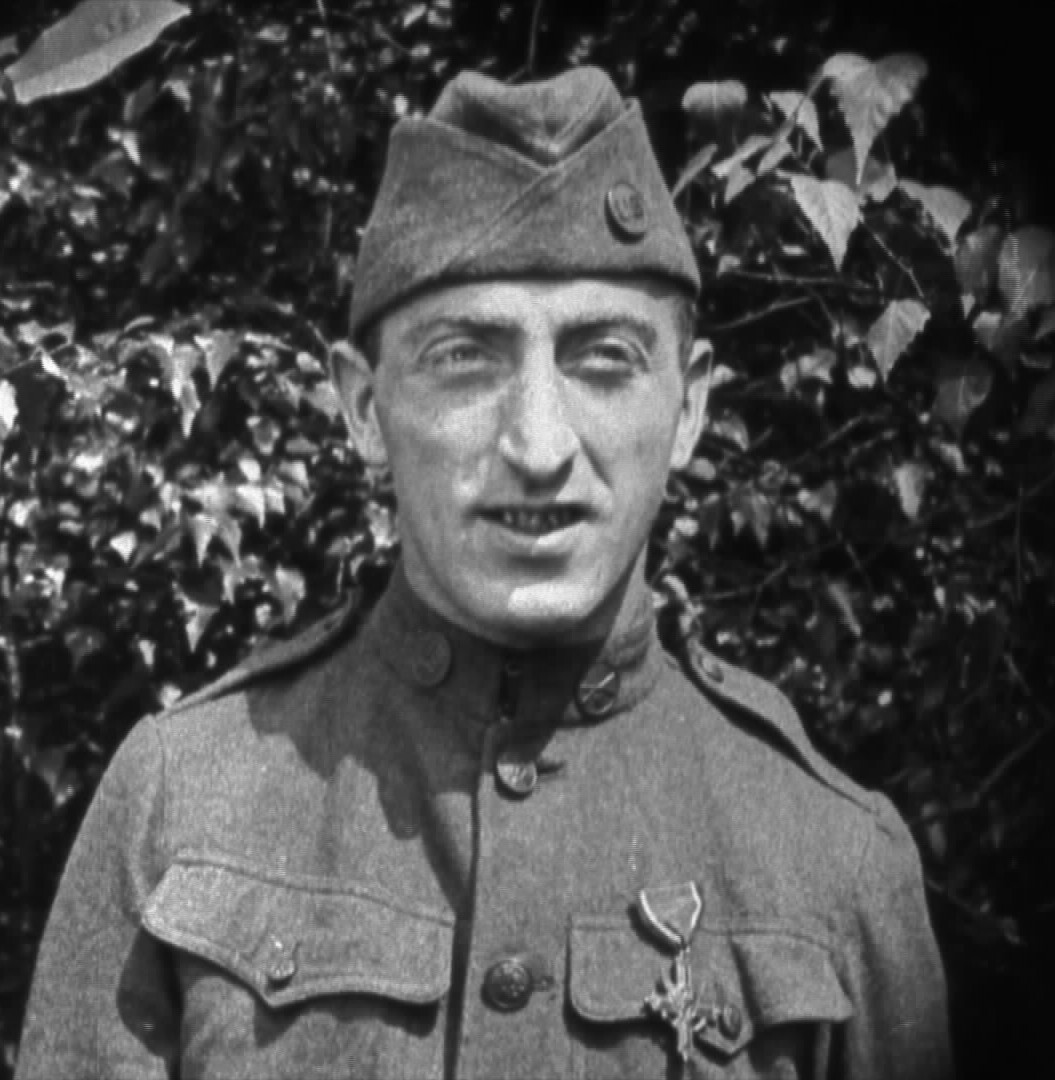
- Abraham Krotoshinsky in The Lost Battalion (1919)
- Born: December 28, 1892; Plotsk, Poland
- Died: November 24, 1953 (aged 60); New York City, United States
- Burial place: New Jersey, United States
- Military career
- Allegiance: United States
- Branch: United States Army
- Service years: 1917-1919
- Rank: Private
- Service number: 1706855
- Unit: 307th infantry 77th infantry division
- Conflicts: World War I
- Awards: Distinguished Service Cross
- Other work: American settler in Palestine, United States Postal Service

Abraham Krotoshinsky (December 28, 1892 – November 24, 1953) was a United States Army soldier who received the Distinguished Service Cross in recognition of his actions as part of The Lost Battalion during the final weeks of World War I.

== Early life ==
A son of Wolf Krotoshinsky, he was born in Plotsk, Poland, then part of the Russian Empire, and came to New York City in 1912 in order to escape service in the Russian Army. He initially worked as a barber "I ran away from Russia and came to America to escape military service. I hated Russia, its people, its government, in particular its cruel and inhuman treatment of Jews. Such a Government I refused to serve. "

== Military service ==
Krotoshinsky undertook initial training at Camp Upton, where he enjoyed his time in the Army. Shortly after his arrival in France, the 77th Division was sent to relieve the 42nd Division in the Lorraine, where the German Army sent up a welcome balloon which said "Goodbye, Forty-Second! Hello, Seventy-Seventh!. Shortly thereafter, the 77th was moved to near Château-Thierry, where it would form part of the drive against Germany. Krotoshinsky passed a message, which led him to help rescue the trapped company. During this trip, he played dead and his hand was stepped on by a German officer. After the action he was awarded the Distinguished Service Cross by General John J. Pershing, the Commander-in-Chief of the American Expeditionary Forces (AEF). The citation for his DSC reads:

The President of the United States of America, authorized by Act of Congress, July 9, 1918, takes pleasure in presenting the Distinguished Service Cross to Private Abraham Krotoshinsky (ASN: 1706855), United States Army, for extraordinary heroism in action while serving with Company K, 307th Infantry Regiment, 77th Division, A.E.F., in Argonne Forest, France, 6 October 1918. Private Krotoshinsky was on liaison duty with a battalion of the 308th Infantry which was surrounded by the enemy north of the Forest De la Buinonne in the Argonne Forest. After patrols and runners had been repeatedly shot down while attempting to carry back word of the battalion's position and condition, Private Krotoshinsky volunteered for the mission and successfully accomplished it.

== After the war ==
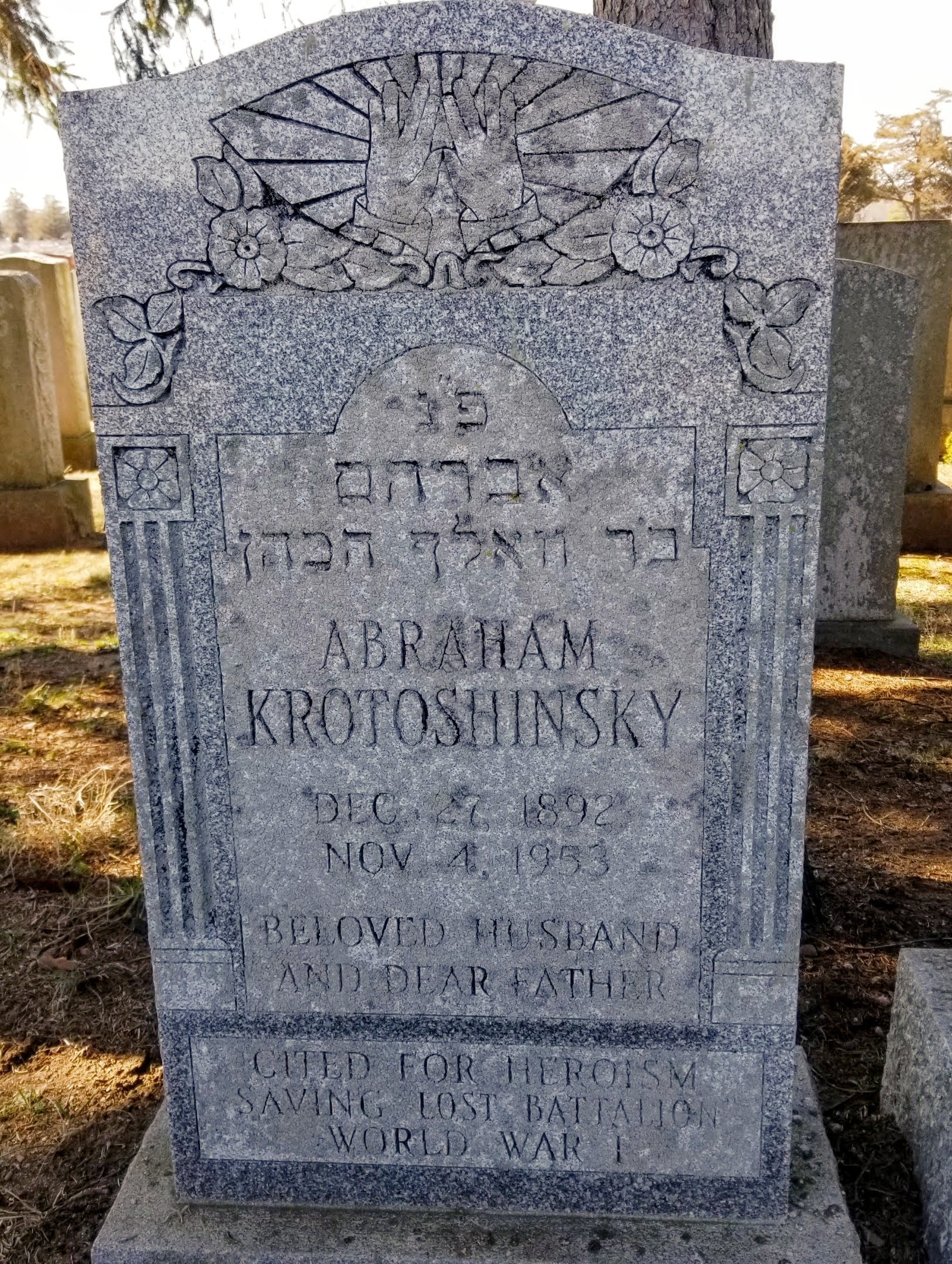
The grave of Private Abraham Krotoshinsky

Krotoshinsky portrayed himself in the 1919 film, The Lost Battalion (1919).

Krotoshinsky, with the help of Nathan Strauss, emigrated to Palestine, but found that he did not have the capital to farm successfully. He described himself as a Zionist. After his return to the United States in 1927, was given a job by executive order from President Calvin Coolidge with the United States Postal Service. where he served at the 221 East Thirty-Fourth Street Post-office until his death on 4 November 1953, at the age of 60. He was survived by three daughters, Mrs. Abigail Krotoshinsky (née Arkin) - a foster daughter, a brother Joseph, and, currently, has many descendants.

== Popular culture ==
He was portrayed by Arthur Kremer in the 2001 production of The Lost Battalion.
