= 307th Infantry Regiment =

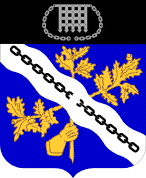
- 307th Infantry Regiment Coat of Arms
- Active: 1917–1919; 1921–1946; 1946–present
- Country: United States
- Branch: Army
- Type: Infantry
- Size: Regiment
- Part of: 174th Infantry Brigade
- Regimental Headquarters: Joint Base McGuire–Dix–Lakehurst, New Jersey
- Motto: Clear The Way
- Facings: Light blue
- Campaigns: World War I; Oise-Aisne; Meuse-Argonne; Champagne 1918; Lorraine 1918; World War II; Western Pacific; Leyte (with arrowhead); Ryukyus (with arrowhead)
- Decorations: Philippine Presidential Unit Citation

The 307th Infantry Regiment was a National Army unit first organized for service in World War I as part of the 77th Division in France. It later served in the Pacific Theater during World War II. Since then it has served as a training Regiment. In 1999, it was withdrawn from the Combat Arms Regimental System and redesignated as a non-branch regiment. The regiment's 1st Battalion is assigned to the 174th Infantry Brigade at Joint Base McGuire–Dix–Lakehurst, New Jersey, with the 2nd Battalion is assigned to the 157th Infantry Brigade at Camp Atterbury, Indiana.

== Battalions ==
The 1st Battalion is currently serving at Joint Base McGuire–Dix–Lakehurst, New Jersey, under command of the 174th Infantry Brigade training Army Reserve and Army National Guard soldiers for service in support of Overseas Contingency Operations and specializes in training Infantry Soldiers. The 2nd Battalion is stationed at Camp Atterbury, Indiana and concentrates on training Field Artillery units under the command of the 157th Infantry Brigade.

== History ==
=== World War I ===
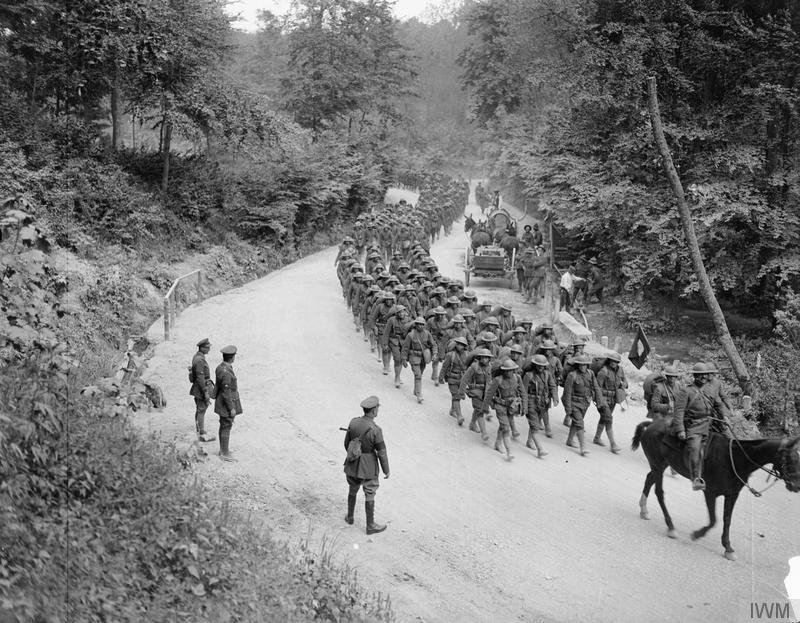
The 307th Infantry Regiment, 77th American Division (attached to 42nd Division for instruction), headed by a British regimental band, marching past Major-General Arthur Solly-Flood (GOC 42nd Division) on a road near Famechon, 7 June 1918

The Regiment was constituted 5 August 1917 in the National Army as the 307th Infantry and assigned to the 154th Infantry Brigade of the 77th Division. It was organized at Camp Upton, New York, on 29 August 1917. During May 1918 it was attached to the British 42nd (East Lancashire) Division in France for battle training. Thereafter the regiment participated in the following campaigns: Oise-Aisne, Meuse-Argonne, Champagne, and Lorraine. Company K was a member of the "Lost Battalion". The commander of Company K, Captain Nelson M. Holderman was awarded the Medal of Honor. After completing its war service in France, the regiment sailed to New York City aboard the U.S.S. America. The regiment demobilized at Camp Upton on 9 May 1919.

=== Between the Wars ===
The regiment was reconstituted in the Organized Reserves as the 307th Infantry on 24 June 1921 and reassigned to the 77th Division (later redesignated as the 77th Infantry Division) within the II Corps area. It was actually organized in August 1921 with the entire Regiment located in New York, New York. The 307th conducted summer training most years with the 16th and 18th Infantry Regiments at Camp Dix, New Jersey, or Fort Slocum, New York, and some years with the 26th Infantry Regiment at Plattsburg Barracks, New York. Also conducted infantry Citizens Military Training Camp (CMTC) training some years at Camp Dix and Plattsburg Barracks as an alternate form of summer training. The primary ROTC feeder schools were the College of the City of New York and New York University. The Regimental designated mobilization training station was Camp Dix.

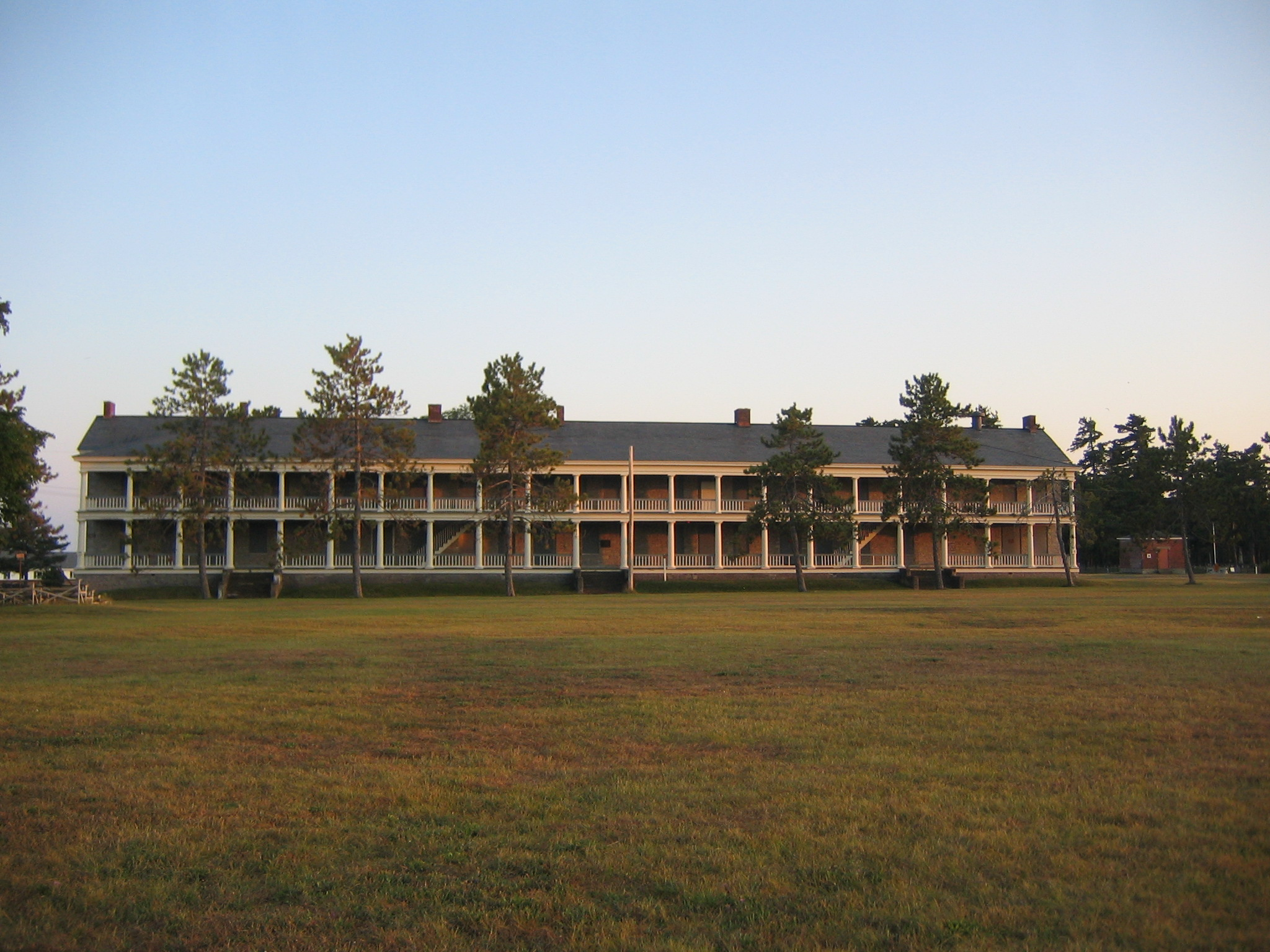

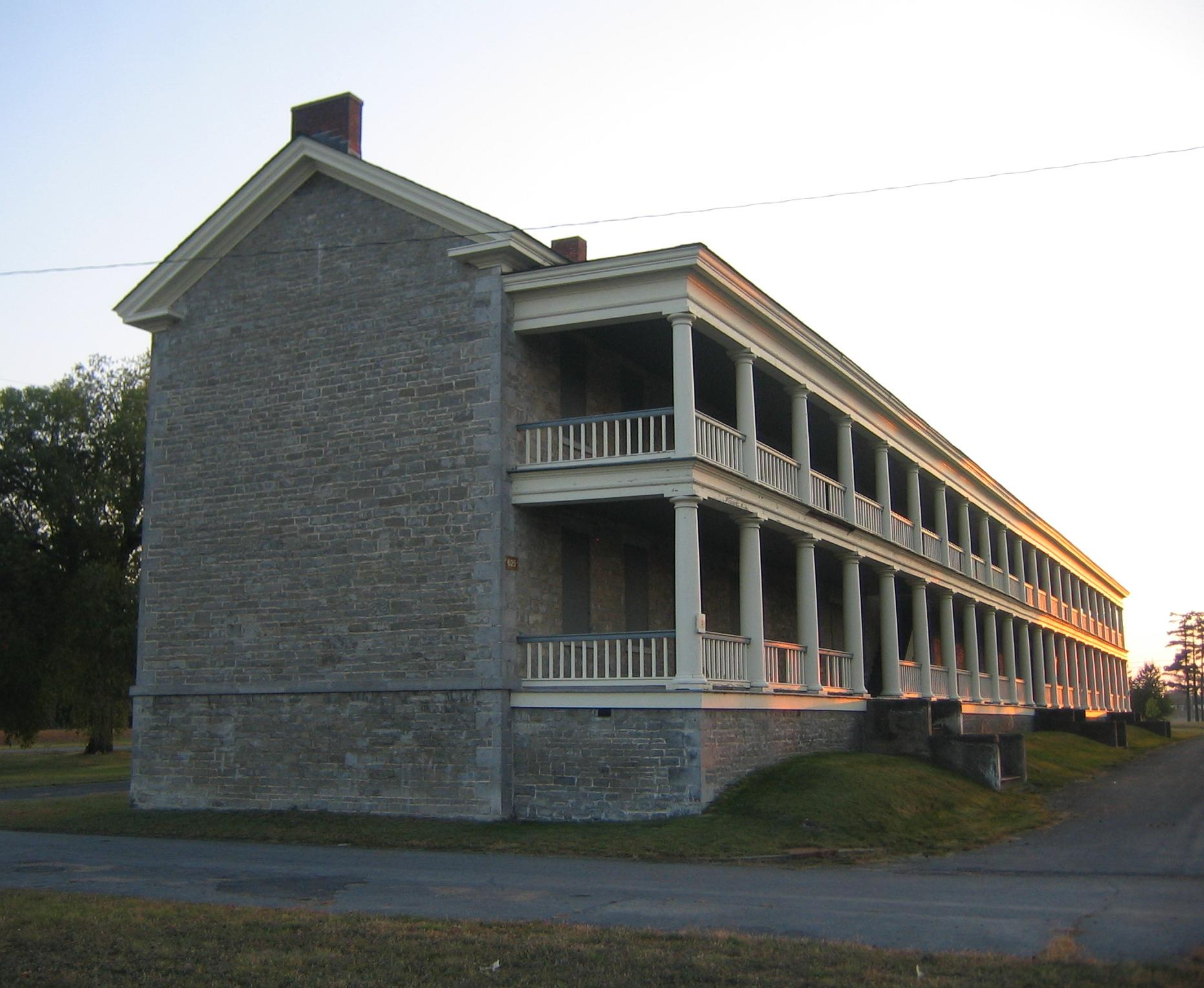

=== World War II ===
Ordered into active military service 25 March 1942 and reorganized at Fort Jackson, South Carolina. The regiment participated in the January 1943 Louisiana Maneuvers. In July 1943, the regiment was organized with 3,256 officers and enlisted men:

- Headquarters & Headquarters Company- 111
  - Service Company- 114
  - Anti-Tank Company- 165
  - Cannon Company- 118
  - Medical Detachment- 135
- Infantry Battalion (x3)- 871
  - Headquarters & Headquarters Company- 126
  - Rifle Company (x3)- 193
  - Weapons Company- 156

The regiment departed San Francisco on 23 March 1944 and arrived in Hawaii on 1 April. The 307th first saw combat during the liberation of Guam in July, 1944. The 307th served in the liberation of the Philippines, arriving on 23 November 1944. The 2nd Battalion was detached for duty on Samar from 30 November until 14 December. The regiment assaulted Yakabi Shima on 26 March and Company G assaulted Kuba Shima on 27 March. The regiment fought on Okinawa from 27 April though 27 June. Arrived in Japan for occupation duties on 5 October 1945 and inactivated there 15 March 1946.

=== Post War Service ===
Activated 17 December 1946 in the Organized Reserves with headquarters in the Bronx, New York. In May 1959 the regiment was reorganized as a parent regiment under the Combat Arms Regimental System to consist of the 1st Battle Group, an element of the 77th Infantry Division under the Pentomic division design. After adoption of the ROAD program, the regiment was reorganized on 26 March 1963 to consist of the 1st and 2d Battalions, subordinate elements of the 77th Infantry Division. The 1st and 2d Battalions were inactivated 30 December 1965 and relieved from assignment to the 77th Infantry Division.

=== Under the 87th Training Division ===
The 307th Infantry was withdrawn 17 October 1999 from the Combat Arms Regimental System, redesignated as the 307th Regiment, and reorganized to consist of the 1st, 2d, and 3d Battalions, elements of the 87th Division (Training Support). The 1st, 2d, and 3d Battalions were concurrently allotted to the Regular Army.

=== Realignment to the 174th Infantry Brigade ===
On 15 December 2009 all three Battalions were relieved from assignment to the 87th Division (Training Support). 1st Battalion was then assigned to the 174th Infantry Brigade and is currently stationed at Fort Dix, New Jersey.

== Lineage and honors ==
=== Lineage ===
- Constituted 5 August 1917 in the National Army as the 307th Infantry and assigned to the 77th Division
- Organized 29 August 1917 at Camp Upton, New York
- Demobilized 9 May 1919 at Camp Upton, New York
- Reconstituted 24 June 1921 in the Organized Reserves as the 307th Infantry and assigned to the 77th Division (later redesignated as the 77th Infantry Division)
- Organized in August 1921 with headquarters at New York, New York
- Ordered into active military service 25 March 1942 and reorganized at Fort Jackson, South Carolina
- Inactivated 15 March 1946 in Japan
- Activated 17 December 1946 in the Organized Reserves with headquarters at Bronx, New York

(Organized Reserves redesignated 25 March 1948 as the Organized Reserve Corps; redesignated 9 July 1952 as the Army Reserve)
(Location of Headquarters changed 30 January 1951 to New York, New York; changed 2 August 1954 to Bronx, New York)

- Reorganized 1 May 1959 as a parent regiment under the Combat Arms Regimental System to consist of the 1st Battle Group, an element of the 77th Infantry Division
- Reorganized 26 March 1963 to consist of the 1st and 2d Battalions, elements of the 77th Infantry Division
- 1st and 2d Battalions inactivated 30 December 1965 and relieved from assignment to the 77th Infantry Division
- 307th Infantry withdrawn 17 October 1999 from the Combat Arms Regimental System, redesignated as the 307th Regiment, and reorganized to consist of the 1st, 2d, and 3d Battalions, elements of the 87th Division (Training Support); 1st, 2d, and 3d Battalions concurrently allotted to the Regular Army

(1st, 2d, and 3d Battalions relieved 15 December 2009 from assignment to the 87th Division [Training Support])

=== Campaign participation credit ===
Conflict	Streamer	Year(s)
World War I	Oise-Aisne	1917
World War I	Meuse-Argonne	1917
World War I	Champagne	1918
World War I	Lorraine	1918
World War II	Western Pacific	
World War II	Leyte (with Arrowhead)	1944
World War II	Ryukyus(with Arrowhead)	1945

=== Decorations ===
Ribbon	Award	Embroidered	Year	Earned by
	Presidential Unit Citation	Okinawa	1945	1st Battalion
	Philippine Presidential Unit Citation	None	1944	Entire Regiment
	Army Superior Unit Award	2007-2008	2007-2008	1st and 2nd Battalion

== Distinctive unit insignia ==
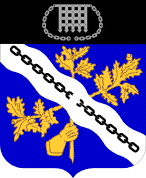

- Description/Blazon: Azure, a mailed dexter hand grasping an oak branch fructed Or debruised by a bend wavy Argent charged with a broken chain Sable, on a chief of the last a portcullis of the third.
- Symbolism: The mailed gauntlet grasping the oak branch symbolizes the drive through the Argonne Forest in World War I; the broken chain, the rescue of the surrounded troops; the bend represents the Vesle River; the portcullis, Grand Pré.
- Background: The coat of arms was originally approved for the 307th Regiment Infantry, Organized Reserves on 12 May 1924. It was amended to withdraw "Organized Reserves" from the designation and to delete the Organized Reserves' crest from the coat of arms on 10 Aug 1959. On 28 Jul 1970 it was amended to reinstate the crest of the Army Reserve and revise the symbolism for the 307th Infantry Regiment. The coat of arms was redesignated for the 307th Regiment on 8 Apr 1999.
