= Constance Kopp =

American under sheriff

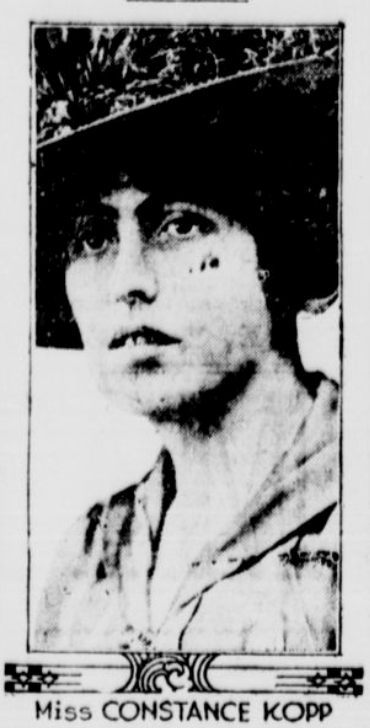
- Born: 1878; Brooklyn, New York
- Died: 1931 (aged 52–53)
- Resting place: Cedar Lawn Cemetery, Passaic, New Jersey
- Occupations: Under Sheriff, Hackensack, New Jersey

Constance Amelie Kopp (1878-1931) was the first female undersheriff in the United States.

== Early life ==
Constance Kopp was born in Brooklyn, New York. She later moved to a farm in Wyckoff, New Jersey with her family which included her sister Norma. Kopp, who was unmarried, became pregnant and gave birth to a baby girl named Fleurette. The child was raised to believe that she was Constance's sister. The three Kopp women are often referred to as The Kopp Sisters.

== Career ==
In July 1914, Kopp's family buggy was struck in Paterson, New Jersey by a vehicle driven by Henry Kaufman, owner of a local silk factory. Kopp requested payment from Kaufman to cover repair costs, but he did not respond. Kopp sued and was awarded a $50 judgement that Kaufman refused to pay.

Soon after filing the suit, Kopp began receiving threatening letters signed "Friends of HK". Prowlers appeared at the Kopp family farm and their home was fired upon. Kopp received a threatening letter instructing her to deliver $1,000 to a 'Woman in Black'. She reported to the meeting spot with a concealed handgun and police lurking nearby. The 'Woman in Black' did not appear.

George Ewing, an associate of Kaufman's, asked Kopp for a meeting after claiming to know about a plot to kidnap Fleurette. Kopp once again concealed a handgun and went to the meeting place in Somerville, New Jersey. Ewing physically engaged Kopp, but she was able to get away. Police waiting nearby detained Ewing.

A handwriting sample obtained from Kaufman was soon determined to match the threatening letters sent to Kopp. At trial, Kaufman was found guilty and fined $1,000.

Sheriff Robert Heath of Hackensack, New Jersey was impressed with Kopp's help in the case against Kaufman and made her his under sheriff. She was the first woman to hold such a position.

In November 1916, a republican sheriff was elected after which Kopp was fired and replaced. She challenged her dismissal claiming that the law protected the jobs of civil servants that were appointed by the previous political party. She was not successful.

== In popular culture ==
In 2015, writer Amy Stewart published Girl Waits With Gun, a novel based on Kopp's life. The title comes from one of a number of newspaper headlines about Kopp's conflict with Kaufman. A series of novels followed. It was announced in 2018 that Amazon is developing a series based on the novels.

Kopp's story was depicted in the 2016 "Siblings" episode of Comedy Central's Drunk History. Constance was portrayed by Rachel Bilson.
