= Nelson M. Holderman =

United States Army Medal of Honor recipient (1885–1953)

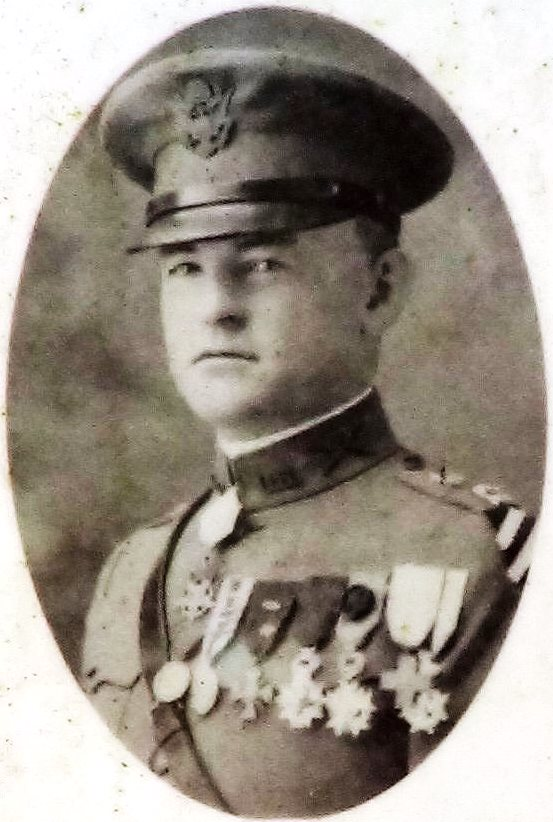
- Born: Nebuchadnezzar Holderman; November 10, 1885; Trumbull, Nebraska, U.S.
- Died: September 3, 1953 (aged 67); San Bruno, California, U.S.
- Burial place: Golden Gate National Cemetery
- Military career
- Allegiance: United States
- Branch: United States Army
- Service years: 1916–1923
- Rank: Colonel
- Nickname: "Neb"
- Units: 307th Infantry, 77th Division
- Conflicts: World War I: Meuse-Argonne Offensive
- Awards: Medal of Honor; Silver Star; Purple Heart (3)

Colonel Nelson Miles Holderman (November 10, 1885 – September 3, 1953) was a United States Army officer, most notable for commanding a rifle company of the Lost Battalion during World War I for which he received the Medal of Honor. He was considered by many to be one of the most decorated American soldiers of the war.

== Biography ==
Holderman was born in Trumbull, Nebraska, on November 10, 1885, to Upton Christian Holderman Jr. and Mary Morse. His father had served as a private in Company "A", 22nd Iowa Infantry Regiment during the American Civil War. He was named Nelson Miles Holderman after Nelson A. Miles, a leading officer in the Civil War and recipient of the Medal of Honor. He was the second oldest son in a family which included three older sisters and two brothers. In 1893, his family moved to Tustin, California, where his parents bought 30 acres (120,000 m^{2}) of land to grow oranges, walnuts and apricots. After his 18th birthday he requested permission from his parents to legally change his name to Nelson Miles who was a US Army Officer and Medal of Honor recipient his father had served under in the Civil War.

== Early military career ==
(L-R) Holderman with Lieutenants A. K. Ford and Chas D. Swanne in 1917

In 1916, Holderman enlisted as a private in the Santa Ana unit of the California Army National Guard. From June to October of that year, he participated in patrols on the United States–Mexico border during the time of Pancho Villa's raids. Holderman quickly rose through the ranks and by the time of the American entry into World War I, which occurred on April 6, 1917, he was a captain, and a company commander in charge of Company L, 160th Infantry, 40th Infantry Division of his Santa Ana unit.

== World War I ==
Upon arrival on the Western Front the following year his company was assigned as replacements for Company K of the 307th Infantry Regiment, part of the 77th Division of the American Expeditionary Force (AEF). Even though Holderman was a replacement officer for Company K, he was very well respected by the soldiers under his command due in part to his previous experience prior to the war. As an officer he was regarded as a "soldier's soldier" who never turned down a patrol and saw his military service as "an adventure".

His unit took part in the Meuse–Argonne offensive in late September 1918. On October 3 a major offensive began whose purpose was to break the German line in the Argonne forest. Of all the units who took part in the initial assault, elements of two battalions under the command of Major Charles Whittlesey were able to break through. However, as the only units to have reached their objectives they had gone too far into German territory and were subsequently cut off. Initial attempts were made to reach Whittlesey and his men but all the units were met with heavy resistance and had to pull back. Only Holderman's Company K, composed of 97 men, had managed to reach Major Whittlesey's units, which incorrectly became known as "The Lost Battalion" even though there were officially two elements of a battalion. With not enough men able to close the distance between Whittlesey and the American lines, Holderman and his company subsequently became part of the Lost Battalion. Holderman was tasked to command the right flank. Though severely wounded early on in the five-day siege, Holderman continued to lead his men until finally being relieved. The war came to an end just over a month later, on November 11, 1918 at 11:00am.

== Medal of Honor citation ==
Rank and organization: Captain, U.S. Army, 307th Infantry, 77th Division. Place and date: At Charlevaux, Argonne Forest, France; 2–8 October 1918. Entered service at: Santa Ana, California. Birth: November 10, 1885; Trumbull, Nebraska. General Orders: War Department, General Orders No. 11 (March 12, 1921).

Citation:

Captain Holderman commanded a company of a battalion which was cut off and surrounded by the enemy. He was wounded on 4, 5, and 7 October, but throughout the entire period, suffering great pain and subjected to fire of every character, he continued personally to lead and encourage the officers and men under his command with unflinching courage and with distinguished success. On 6 October, in a wounded condition, he rushed through enemy machinegun and shell fire and carried two wounded men to a place of safety.

== Silver Star citation ==
Rank and organization: Captain, U.S. Army, 307th Infantry, 77th Division. General Orders: War Department, General Orders No. 28 (1921).

Citation:

By direction of the President, under the provisions of the act of Congress approved July 9, 1918 (Bul. No. 43, W.D., 1918), Captain (Infantry) Nelson Miles Holderman, United States Army, is cited for gallantry in action and a silver star may be placed upon the ribbon of the Victory Medals awarded him. Captain Holderman distinguished himself by gallantry in action while serving with the 307th Infantry, 77th Division, in action during an attack on the Depot de Machines, Argonne Forest, France, 30 September 1918. His leadership and gallantry were a splendid example to his officers and men.

== Military awards ==
Holderman's military decorations and awards include:

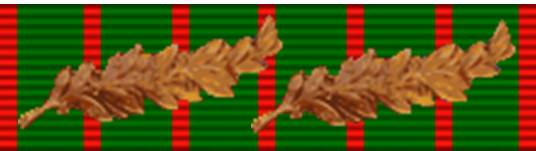

1st row	Medal of Honor		
2nd row	Silver Star	Purple Heart w/two bronze oak leaf clusters	Mexican Border Service Medal
3rd row	World War I Victory Medal w/ three bronze service stars to denote credit for the Oise-Aisne, Meuse-Argonne and Defensive Sector battle clasps.	Légion d'honneur in the degree of Chevalier (French Republic)	Croix de guerre 1914–1918 w/ two bronze palms (French Republic)
4th row	Order of the Crown in the degree of Officer (Belgium)	Order of Leopold II in the degree of Knight (Belgium)	Croce al Merito di Guerra (Italy)

== After World War I ==
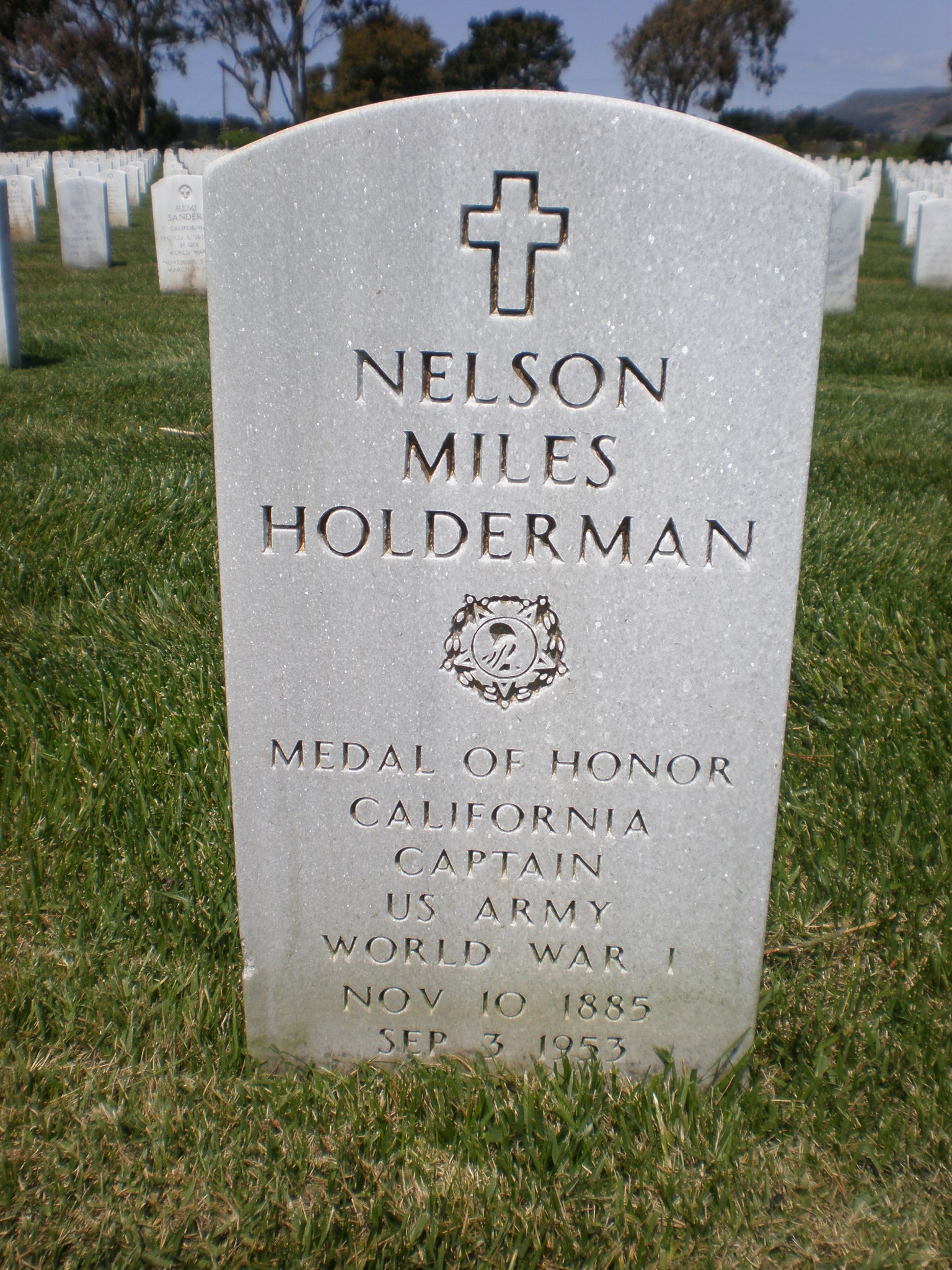
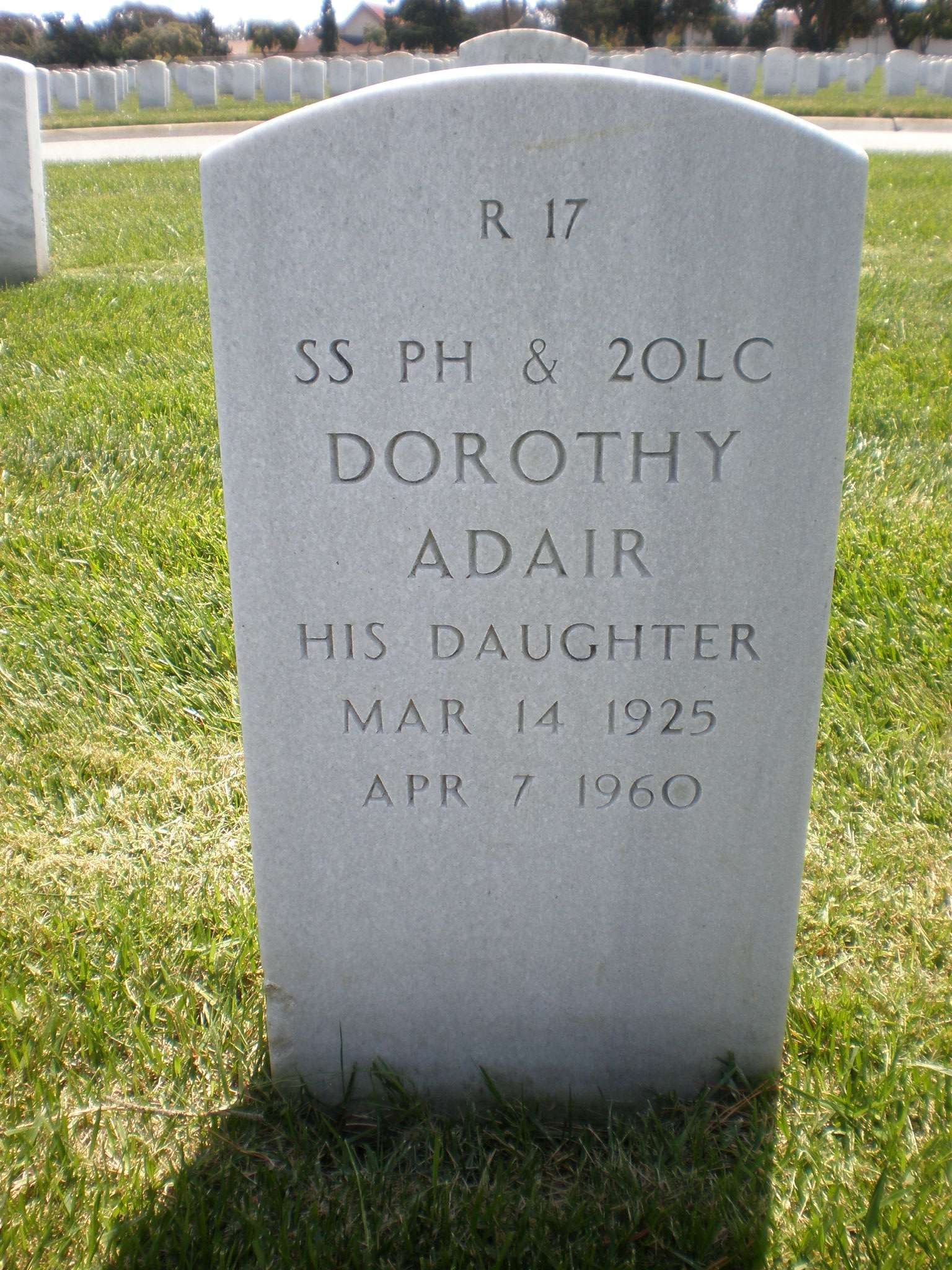
Holderman's gravestone, front and back (his daughter), at Golden Gate National Cemetery

After the war, Holderman rejoined the National Guard and continued to serve for many years, eventually retiring with the rank of colonel. He was appointed as the commandant of the Veterans Home of California Yountville in Yountville, California, caring for veterans. He served from 1923 until his retirement in 1953, during which time he greatly expanded the home. After his death, the Veterans Home was renamed to the Nelson M. Holderman in his honor. Though he was regarded as a national hero, he never used his status for personal gain.

== Namesakes ==
The Captain Nelson M. Holderman U.S. Army Reserve Center in West Los Angeles, California, is named in his honor, as is the main building on the grounds, Holderman Hall.

The main hospital at the Veterans Home of California Yountville is named after Nelson M. Holderman in his honor.

== In popular culture ==
In the 2001 made-for-TV movie The Lost Battalion, Holderman was played by Adam James.

In the last scene of the 1962 film The Manchurian Candidate, Frank Sinatra's character reads the Medal of Honor citations for Holderman and Daniel R. Edwards.

== See also ==
- Charles White Whittlesey – Medal of Honor recipient. Commander of the Lost Battalion
- George G. McMurtry – Medal of Honor recipient. Officer in the Lost Battalion
- List of Medal of Honor recipients
- List of Medal of Honor recipients for World War I
