= The Lost Battalion (2001 film) =

- DVD cover
- Genre: Drama
- Written by: James Carabatsos
- Directed by: Russell Mulcahy
- Starring: Rick Schroder; Michael Brandon
- Music by: Richard Marvin
- Country of origin: United States
- Original languages: English; German

Production
- Executive producers: David Gerber; Michael Weisbarth
- Producers: Avi Noam Levy; Tom Reeve; Romain Schroeder
- Cinematography: Jonathan Freeman
- Editor: William Stich
- Running time: 92 minutes
- Production companies: A&E Television Networks; David Gerber Productions; 20th Century Fox Television

Original release
- Network: A&E
- Release: December 2, 2001

The Lost Battalion is a 2001 American war drama television film about the US 77th Division's Lost Battalion during World War I, which was cut off and surrounded by German forces in the Argonne Forest during the Meuse–Argonne Offensive of 1918. The film was directed by Russell Mulcahy, written by James Carabatsos, and stars Rick Schroder as Major Charles Whittlesey. The film was shot in Luxembourg. It is an A&E Original Movie, premiering on the network on December 2, 2001. It is also played on A&E's sister networks such as The History Channel. It was released on home video in January 2002.

== Plot ==
In October 1918, Major Charles Whittlesey is ordered by Major General Robert Alexander to lead roughly 550 soldiers of the United States Army's 77th Infantry Division into the Argonne forest to repel a German advance. Alexander has little faith in Whittlesey, whom he considers an "overeducated New York lawyer". Alexander considers Whittlesey's men, largely immigrants and poor working class men from the Lower East Side of New York City, to be "acceptable losses". Whittlesey's officers include Captain George McMurty, a veteran of the Rough Riders, and James Leak, an inexperienced lieutenant from Texas.

Whittlesey's battalion fights through the German line, expecting to join American and French forces on their flanks and unaware they've been forced back, leaving the battalion surrounded. Riflemen commanded by Captain Nelson Holderman join them and none of the runners sent to contact headquarters return. Whittlesey uses carrier pigeons to communicate with Alexander, who orders the battalion to push on despite their insecure flanks. American artillery kills several men via friendly fire before Whittlesey is able to contact headquarters by pigeon to request they cease fire. The barrage lifts and the Germans attack the disoriented Americans who repel them in fierce close-quarters combat.

The Americans hold the line through several days of counter-attacks despite severe shortages, forcing them to reuse medical supplies and forage food from dead soldiers. The Germans capture Lieutenant Leak and a wounded soldier, and use them to negotiate Whittlesey's surrender. Leak receives good treatment from an English-speaking German officer who tries to convince him there is no shame in surrender. Leak assures the German his New York gangsters will never give up. The other American captive takes Whittlesey a message from the Germans urging surrender to save lives. Whittlesey responds by throwing the white flag back towards the Germans.

An American airplane flies over their position and the men of the 77th try to get the pilot's attention as the Germans begin firing. The pilot is mortally wounded, but pinpoints the location on his map and returns to the airfield. After six days, reinforcements finally arrive at the American lines and the Germans retreat five days later. Major General Alexander arrives to congratulate Whittlesey who is furious about the debacle. Alexander reveals that the battalion's stand enabled American forces to break through the entire German line. Whittlesey refuses Alexander's offers to return to headquarters in his car, opting to stay with his men. Only 197 of the 550 American troops survived the battle.

World War I ends just three weeks later. Whittlesey is awarded the Medal of Honor for his actions, and the "Lost Battalion" gains iconic status.

== Cast ==
- Rick Schroder as Major Charles W. Whittlesey
- Phil McKee as Captain George G. McMurtry
- Jamie Harris as Sergeant Gaedeke
- Jay Rodan as Lieutenant James V. Leak
- Adam James as Captain Nelson M. Holderman
- Daniel Caltagirone as Private Philip Cepaglia
- Michael Goldstrom as Private Jacob Rosen
- André Vippolis as Private Frank Lipasti
- Rhys Miles Thomas as Private Bob Yoder
- Arthur Kremer as Private Abraham Krotoshinsky
- Adam Kotz as Colonel Johnson
- Justin Scot as Private Omer Richards
- Anthony Azizi as Private Nat Henchman
- George Calil as Private Lowell R. Hollingshead
- Wolf Kahler as Major General (Generalmajor) Freidrich Wilhelm Von Sybel
- Joachim Paul Assböck as Major Fritz Heinrich Prinz
- Michael Brandon as Major General Robert Alexander
- Paul Courtenay Hyu as Private Stanley Chinn
- Josh Cohen as Private Isidore Swersky
- Tim Matthews as Lieutenant Schenck
- Finbar Lynch as Private Ferguson
- Hugh Fraser as General De Coppet
- Ben Andrews as Lieutenant Harold Goettler
- Derek Kueter as Major Wanvig

== Reception ==
The film has received generally positive reviews, praised for its historical accuracy, cast, and intense action. Military.com wrote: "The script is compelling on several levels. Whittlesey, the bookish-looking New York lawyer turned soldier, is the Everyman Warrior that viewers enjoy identifying with. Most would like to think that placed in a similar situation they too would find the courage to act as Whittlesey did. Moreover, the movie offers another take on the classic theme that pits an intrepid underdog David against the prohibitive favorite Goliath. As with the Biblical David — but not with Col. Davy Crockett at the Alamo and Custer at Little Bighorn — the underdog prevails here".

BeyondHollywood.com praised the visuals and cinematography for creating a war movie suitable for television without compromising on intensity and action: "The problem with many war films is that after the gore and bloodletting of Saving Private Ryan any war movie looks like an exercise in G-rated filmmaking. The Lost Battalion gets around this problematic obstacle in two ways — it is based entirely on a true story and Jonathan Freeman blesses it with excellent cinematography...The movie is frenetic, chaotic, and completely breathtaking to look at". The review continued that "The Lost Battalion is filled with brutal and personal action that makes you feel like you're there as the men struggle to survive. The movie has immediacy and a sense of claustrophobia as the enemy appears a few dozen yards in front of you, so close that you can see their eyes from your separate positions. The trench warfare aspect of World War I comes alive in bloody color and pale brown dirt".

== Awards ==
The film was nominated for three 2002 Emmy Awards: Outstanding Single Camera Picture Editing; Outstanding Single Camera Sound Mixing; and Outstanding Sound Editing. It won the Motion Picture Sound Editors award for Best Sound Editing in Television (Effects). It won the Christopher Award for achievement in Television and Cable. It was nominated for the American Cinema Editors award for Best Edited Motion Picture for Commercial Television.
