= George G. McMurtry =

U.S. Medal of Honor recipient

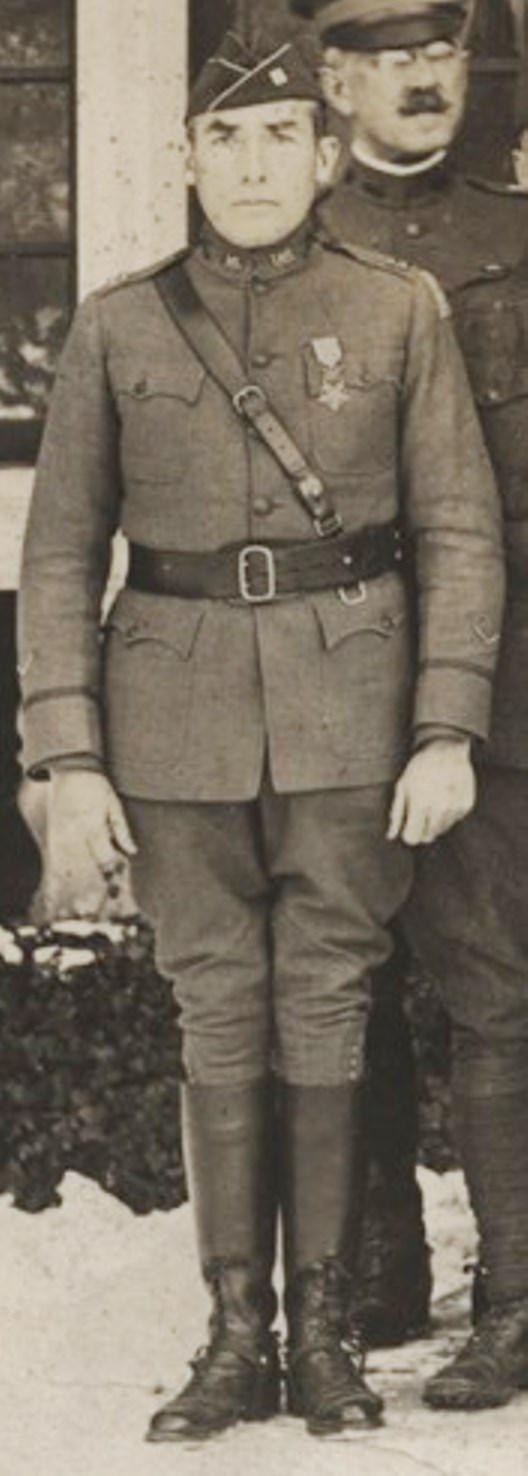
- Medal of Honor recipient
- Born: November 6, 1876; Pittsburgh, Pennsylvania, US
- Died: November 22, 1958 (aged 82)
- Military career
- Allegiance: United States
- Branch: United States Army
- Service years: 1898, 1917–1919
- Rank: Major
- Units: 2nd Battalion, 308th Infantry, 77th Division
- Conflicts: Spanish–American War World War I: Lost Battalion
- Awards: Medal of Honor

George Gibson McMurtry (November 6, 1876 – November 22, 1958) was a United States Army officer, a Medal of Honor recipient and a Harvard Graduate with the Class of 1899.

He first served in the Army as a member of the Rough Riders during the Spanish–American War. He received the Medal of Honor as the executive officer of the Lost Battalion during World War I.

== Early life ==
Born in Pittsburgh, Pennsylvania, in 1876, McMurtry was described as a big, burly, Scottish-American, with a ruddy face who seemed to always be of good cheer. McMurtry attended Harvard but interrupted his studies in 1898 to volunteer for the 1st United States Volunteer Cavalry, popularly known as Theodore Roosevelt's Rough Riders, during the Spanish–American War. He served in Cuba and participated in the fighting at San Juan Hill. Following his service with the Rough Riders, McMurtry returned to Harvard and graduated with the Class of 1899.

== In the Rough Riders in the Spanish–American War ==
At the start of the Spanish–American War, at the age of 22, McMurtry left Harvard to serve as a member of Theodore Roosevelt's 1st US Volunteer Cavalry, known as the Rough Riders. He was a member of Troop D commanded by Captain Robert B. Huston. D Troop was part of the cavalry squadron commanded by Alexander Brodie. As part of D Troop, McMurtry participated in the Battle of Las Guasimas on Friday 24 June 1898 and in the Battle of San Juan Hill on 1 July 1898.

== In the Lost Battalion in World War I ==
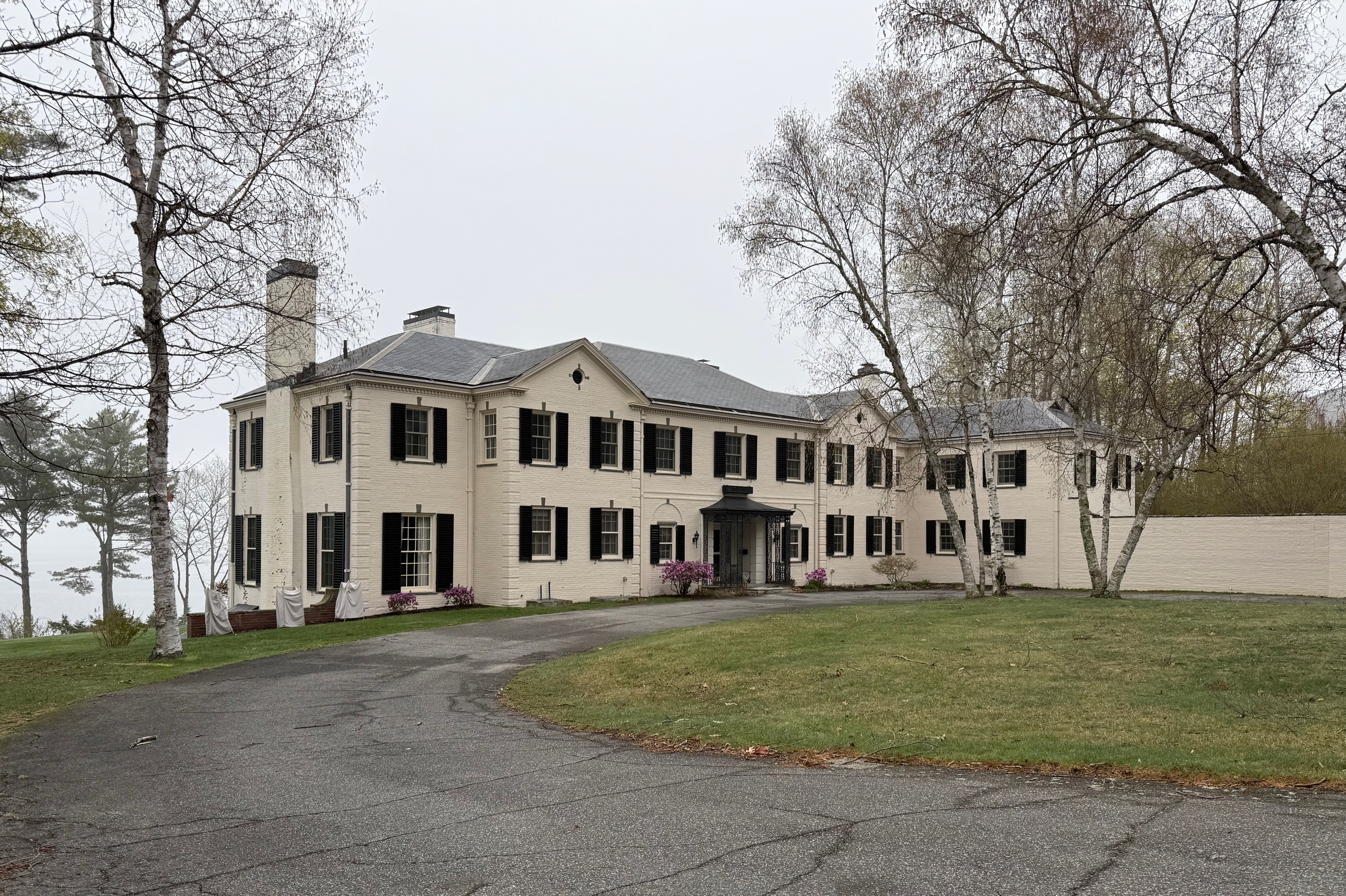
Bayview, a cottage in Bar Harbor, Maine, which McMurtry owned.

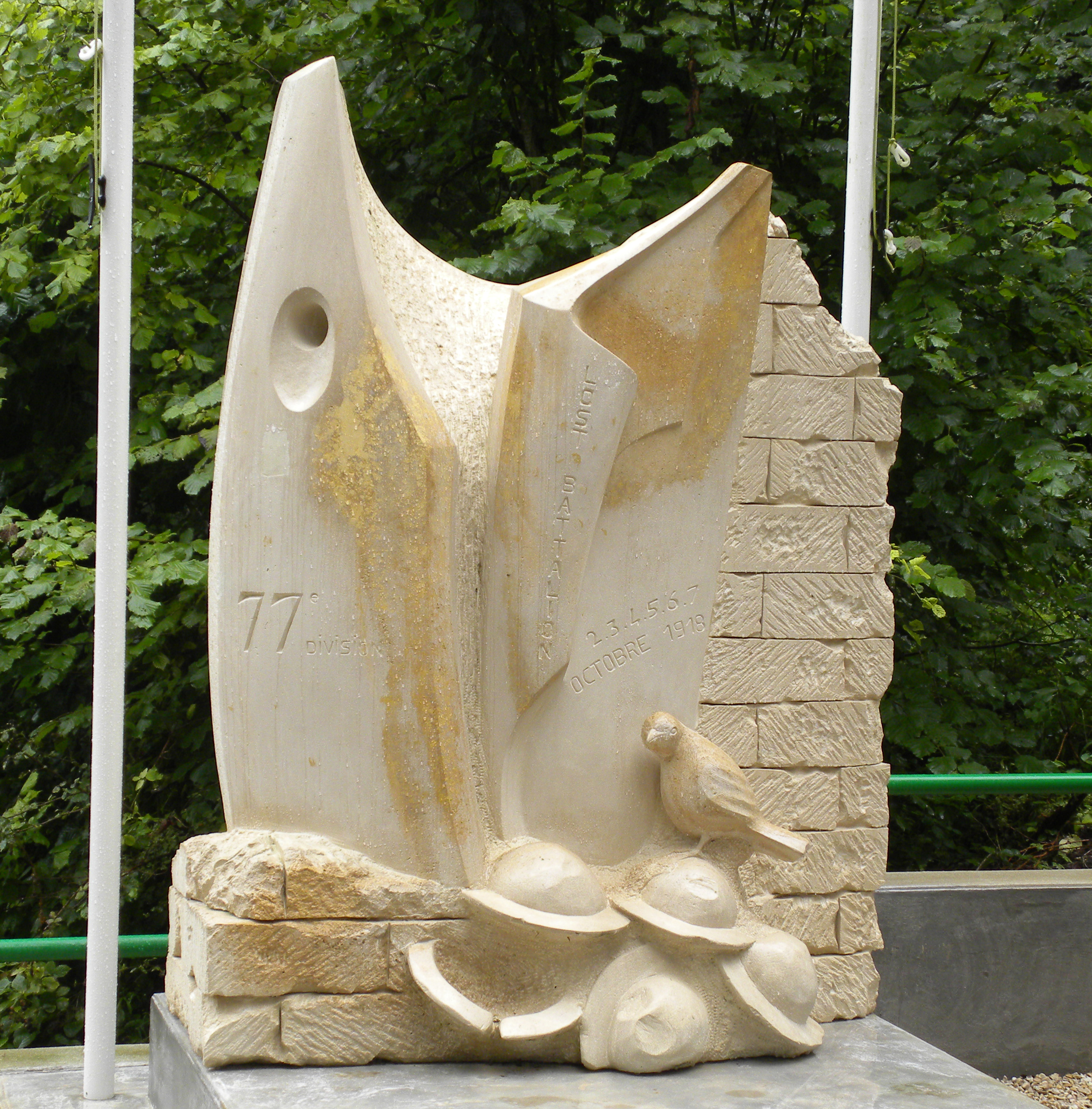
Monument to the Lost Battalion in the Argonne Forest, France.

When the Rough Riders were disbanded, McMurtry returned to Harvard College, graduating in 1899. Like Lt. Colonel Charles Whittlesey, the leader of the Lost Battalion, was also a Harvard Grad (Harvard Law). Whittlesey would go to later make millions of dollars in the stock market after the war. He did not forget an Army career however; he obtained a commission when the Army established its first Officer Candidate Schools in May 1917. By the time World War I started, he was one of the most experienced officers of the newly formed 308th Infantry Regiment.

== Medal of Honor Citation ==
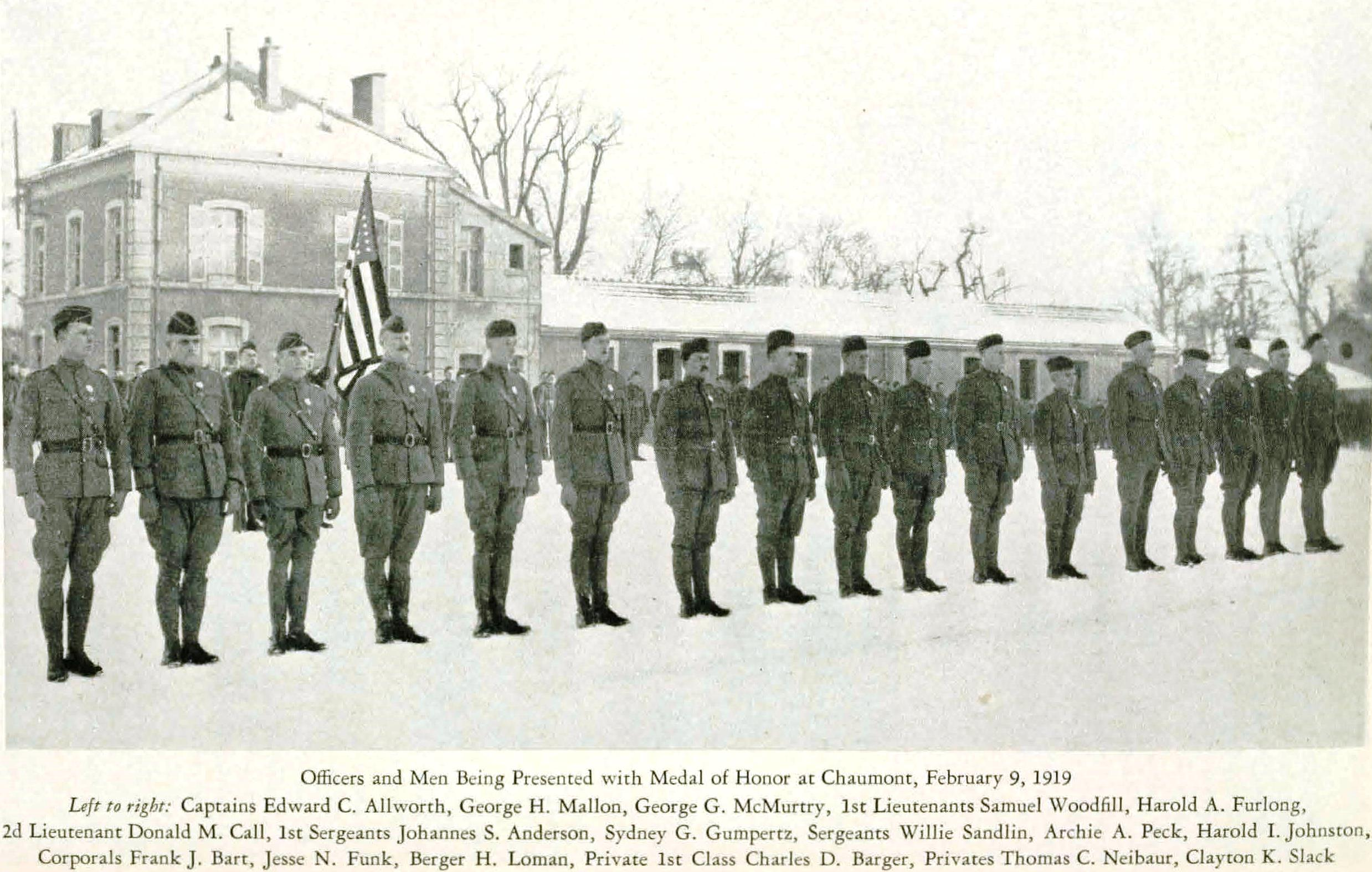
Medal of Honor Presentation Ceremony - February 9, 1919, at Chaumont, France. General John J. Pershing presided.

- Rank and organization: Captain, U.S. Army, 308th Infantry, 77th Division
- Place and date: At Charlevaux, Argonne Forest, France, October 2–8, 1918
- Born: November 6, 1876, Pittsburgh, Pennsylvania
- War Department, General Orders No. 118, December 2, 1918

Citation:

The President of the United States of America, in the name of Congress, takes pleasure in presenting the Medal of Honor to Captain (Infantry) George G. McMurtry, United States Army, for extraordinary heroism on October 2–8, 1918, while serving with 308th Infantry, 77th Division, in action at Charlevaux, Argonne Forest. Captain McMurtry commanded a battalion which was cut off and surrounded by the enemy and although wounded in the knee by shrapnel on 4 October and suffering great pain, he continued throughout the entire period to encourage his officers and men with a resistless optimism that contributed largely toward preventing panic and disorder among the troops, who were without food, cut off from communication with our lines. On 4 October, during a heavy barrage, he personally directed and supervised the moving of the wounded to shelter before himself seeking shelter. On 6 October, he was again wounded in the shoulder by a German grenade, but continued personally to organize and direct the defense against the German attack on the position until the attack was defeated. He continued to direct and command his troops, refusing relief, and personally led his men out of the position after assistance arrived before permitting himself to be taken to the hospital on 8 October. During this period the successful defense of the position was due largely to his efforts.

== Personal life ==
McMurtry married Mabel C. Post on Long Island on December 16, 1903. He was married to Louise Hunt from 1933 to 1942 (with whom he had a daughter, also named Louise, in 1935) and to Teresa Fabbri from 1942 until his death.

In 1930, McMurtry built the Bayview property in Bar Harbor.

== Death ==
McMurtry died on November 22, 1958, aged 82. He is interred in Ledgelawn Cemetery in Bar Harbor, Maine, alongside his third wife.

== Military awards ==
McMurtry's military decorations and awards include:

1st row	Medal of Honor	Purple Heart w/one bronze oak leaf cluster		
2nd row	Spanish Campaign Medal		World War I Victory Medal w/three bronze service stars to denote credit for the Oise-Aisne, Meuse-Argonne and Defensive Sector battle clasps.	Ordre national de la Légion d'honneur degree of Knight (French Republic)
3rd row	Croix de guerre 1914–1918 w/bronze palm (French Republic)		Croce al Merito di Guerra (Italy)	Officer of the Order of Prince Danilo I (Kingdom of Montenegro)

== In popular culture ==
In the 2001 made-for-TV movie The Lost Battalion, McMurtry was portrayed by Phil McKee.

== See also ==
- Charles White Whittlesey
- List of Medal of Honor recipients for World War I
- The Lost Battalion
