= Argonnerwaldlied =

German military march of World War I

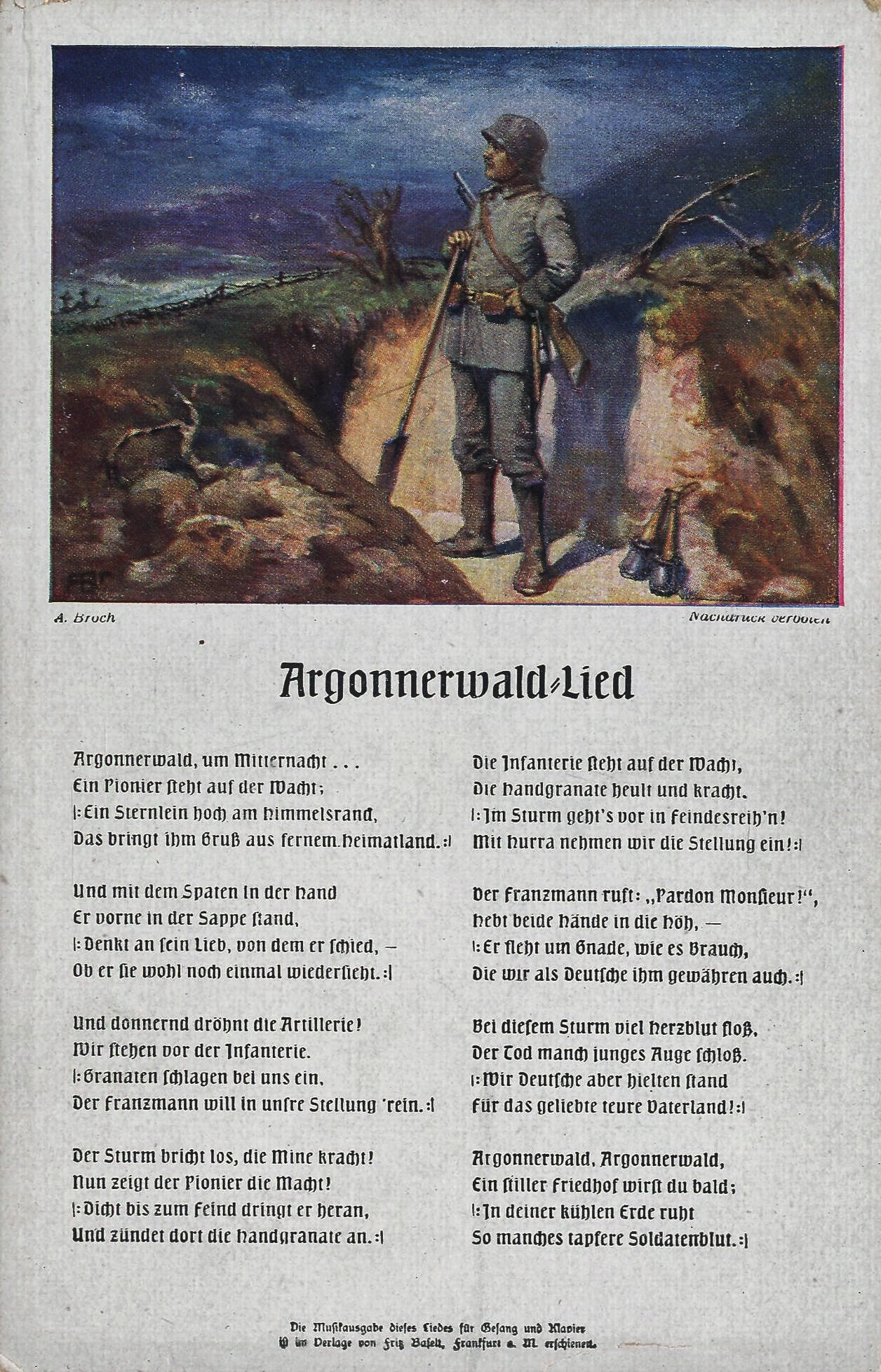

Song
- Language: German
- Published: 1914
- Composer(s): Herman Albert Gordon

Argonnerwaldlied ("Forest of Argonne Song") or "Lied der Pioniere" or "Pionierlied" ("Song of the Pioneers") is a German military march of World War I. It was composed by Hermann Albert Gordon in 1914/1915. It was used during World War I by the German Empire. Variations of the song with different lyrics were used by the Marxist Spartacus League, in Nazi Germany during World War II, and in East Germany.

In 1919, new lyrics were adopted by the revolutionary socialist Spartacus League in commemoration of the January 1919 Spartacist uprising. This version was later arranged by Hanns Eisler and performed by the Erich-Weinert-Ensemble in the German Democratic Republic.

Also known as "Durch deutsches Land marschieren wir", "SA marschiert-Lied" was used through the years of Nazi Germany. It originated in 1929 from Saxony and was a marching song of the National Socialist Sturmabteilung based on the tune of Argonnerwaldlied.

As the song spread through Germany, regional variations of the words "Durch deutsches Land" ("through German land") occurred and were substituted with "Durch Großberlin" ("through Greater Berlin"), "Durch Schwabenland" ("through Schwabenland"), etc. The third stanza also has some slight lyrical variations. The NSDAP songbook version adopted "Wir fürchten SPD und Rotfront nicht" ("we fear not the SPD and Rotfront") whereas the Reichsarbeitsdienst adopted "Wir fürchten Moskau und die Juden nicht" ("we fear not Moscow and the Jews").

The final version of the song, composed in 1941 on the eve of the German invasion of the USSR, is known as "Im Osten nun marschieren wir" ("Now we are marching in the East"). This version included two additions: a long musical introduction in the beginning and syncopation added to stress the word "Achtung" in the last line of the modified verse: "Deutschland marschiert, Achtung! Die Straße frei!" (Germany is marching, watch out! The road is free).
