= Argonnenbahn =

Argonnenbahn (Argonne Railway)
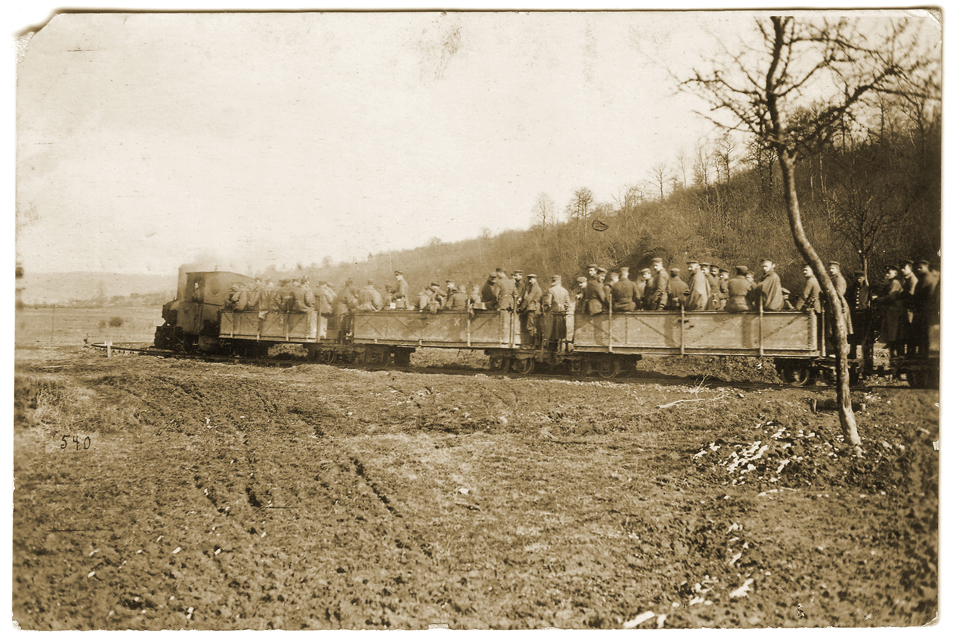
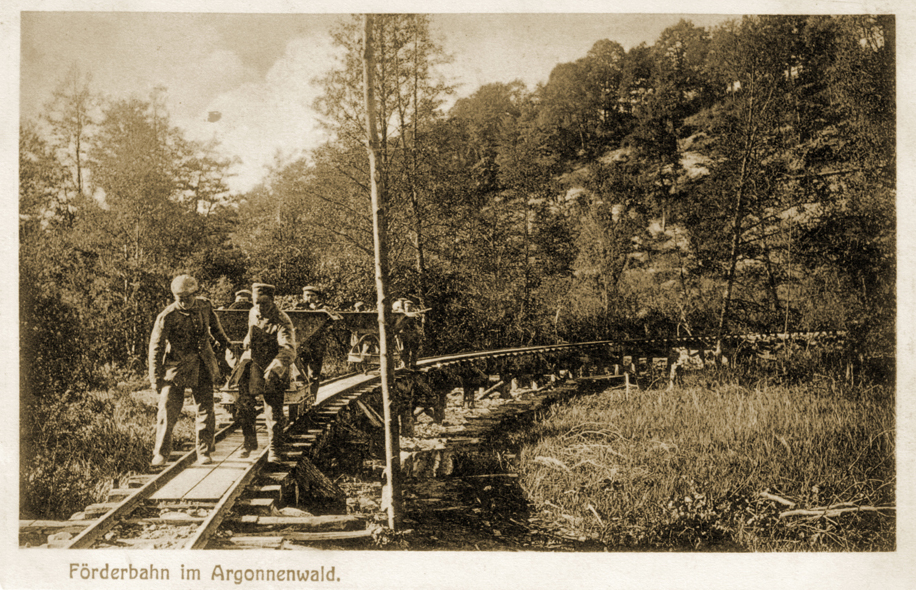
- German troup transport on the Argonnenbahn Manually operated trench railway in the Forest of Argonne

Technical
- Track gauge: 600 mm (1 ft 11 5/8 in)
Route map
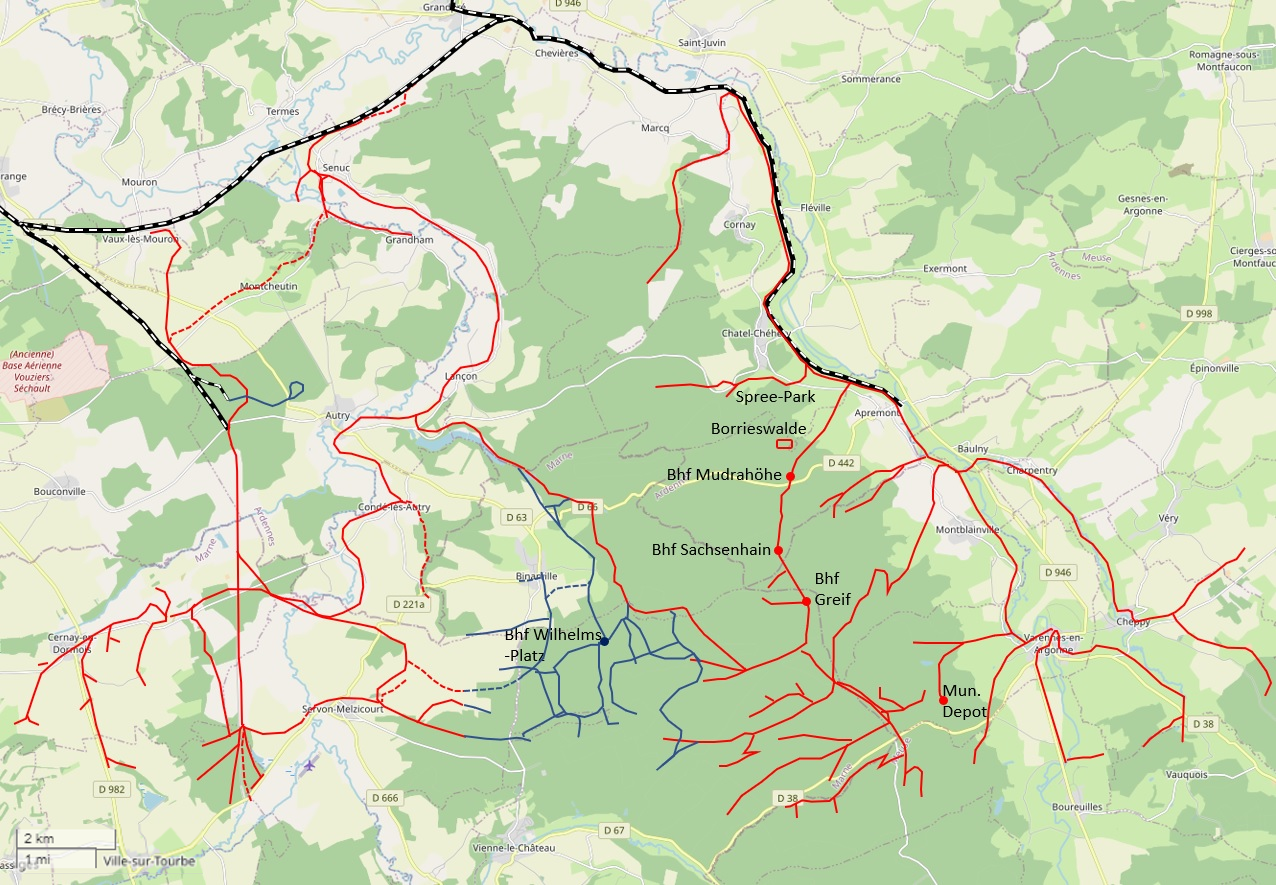
Route of the Argonnenbahn (red) and Förderbahn (blue) superimposed onto a modern map
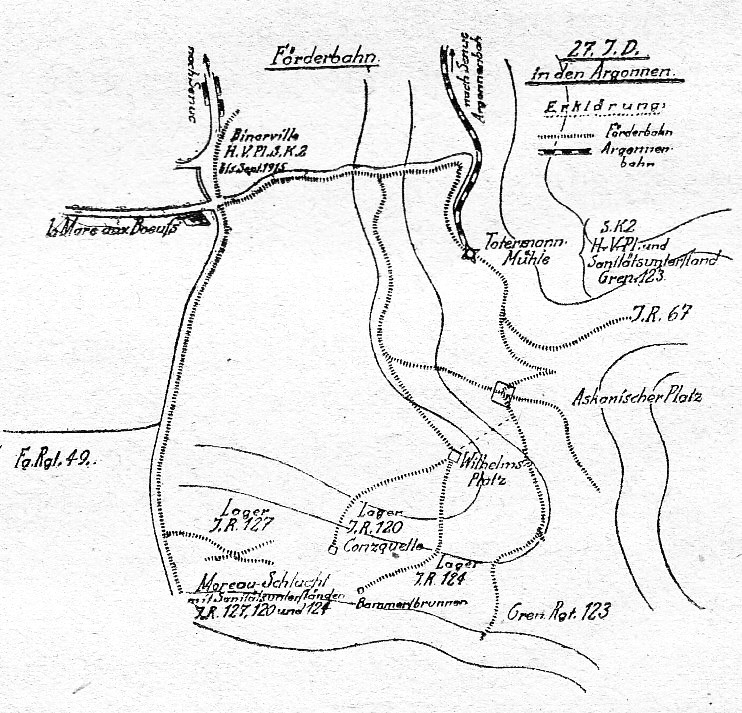
Historic map of the Argonnenbahn to Toter-Mann-Mühle (Dead Man Mill) and the manually operated trench railways

The Argonnenbahn (Argonne Railway) was a light railway in the Forest of Argonne in France, which was laid and operated by the German Army during World War I.

== History ==
=== Argonnenbahn ===
The pioneers of the German army built the Argonnenbahn as a light railway powered by steam and benzene locomotives to transport troops and to supply the front with building materials, weapons, ammunition and supplies. In the opposite direction, it was used to transport the wounded from the Toter-Mann-Mühle (Dead Man Mill) to the Field Hospital No 5 in Senuc, on wagons prepared for the transport of the wounded in accordance with the wartime medical order book.

=== Trench railways ===
Wounded soldiers were transported on the trench railways, which had been laid by the pioneers, using four-wheeled wagons, which were pulled by horses or pushed by paramedics from the reception and triage zone at the medical shelters of the battalion to the terminus of the Argonnenbahn at the Toter-Mann-Mühle (Dead Man Mill). For this purpose, there were 20 waggons, each equipped with an iron frame as a support for 2 stretchers each on coil springs.

== Route ==
The Argonnenbahn was a network of 600 mm (1 ft 11 5/8 in) gauge light railways of the following classes in different stages of development, connected by trench railways:

- Light railway (German: Feldbahn)
  - for steam locomotives
  - for internal combustion engine locomotives/benzene locomotives (German: Motorloks/Benzolloks)
- Trench railway (German: Förderbahn) for horse and hand operation

The stations of the Argonnenbahn carried easy-to-pronounce code names. They were mostly named after towns in Saxony and West Prussia and the officers Bruno von Mudra and Rudolf von Borries.

The western main line led from Senuc via the Hindenburg mill (Lançon), the Charlepaux' camp and the Tafelland station (Binarville) to the Toter-Mann station and from there further south.

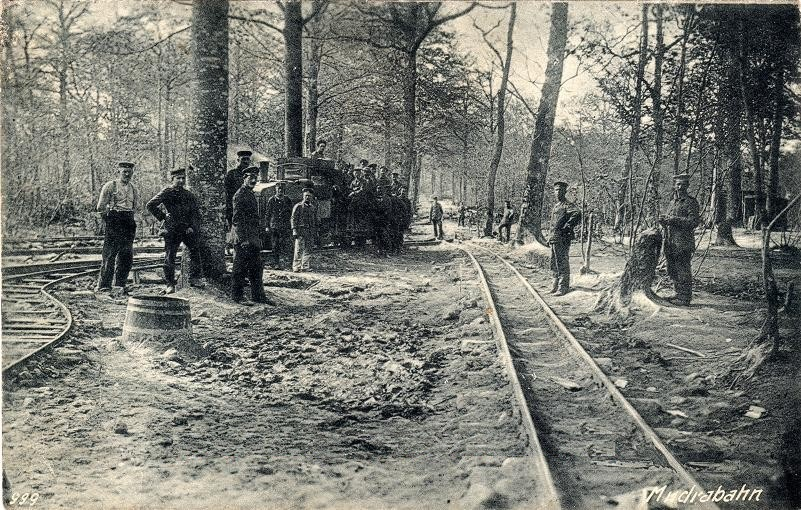
Mudrabahn, 1916/1917

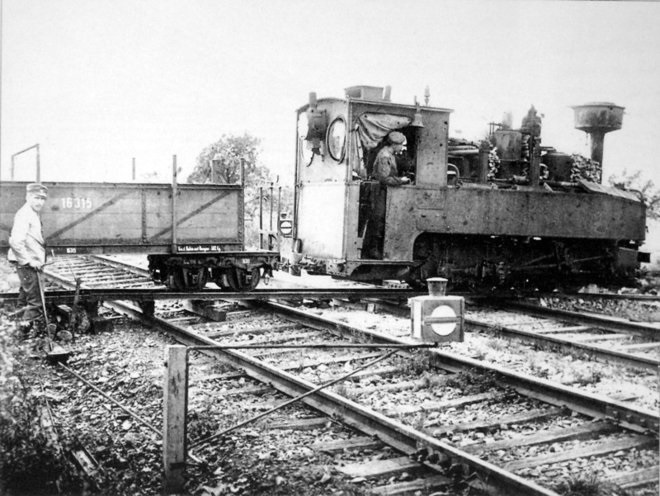
The Argonnenbahn crosses the double-track standard gauge railway

The eastern main line, generally called Mudrabahn, ran from Kleinzwickau station (Apremont) via Beuthen station to Mudrahöhe station, where it branched off. One branch line led north via the Borrieswalde camp to the Waldfriede camp near Chatel, the other branch line led south to the Sachsenhain camp and to the front.
