= Forest of Argonne =

Site of Meuse-Argonne Offensive

Coordinates: 49°09′N 4°58′E

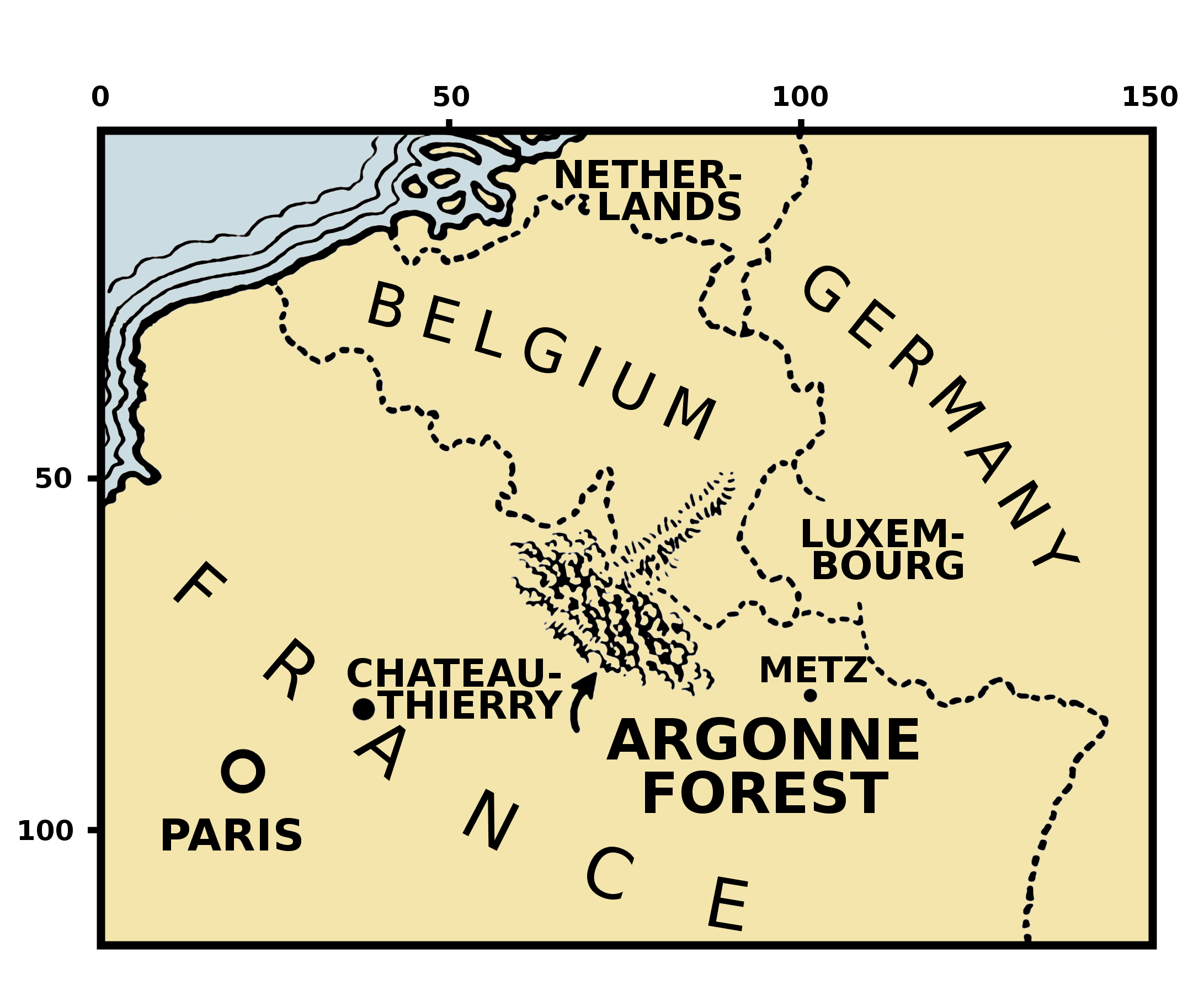
Location of Forest of Argonne in northeastern France

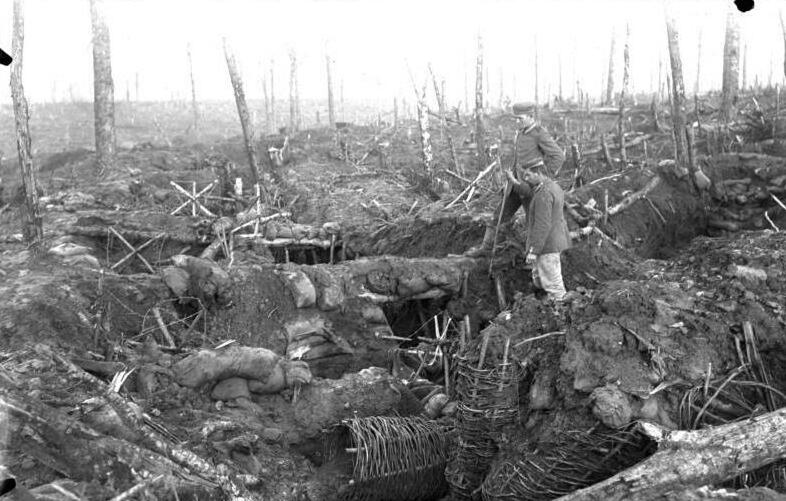
Forest of Argonne in 1915

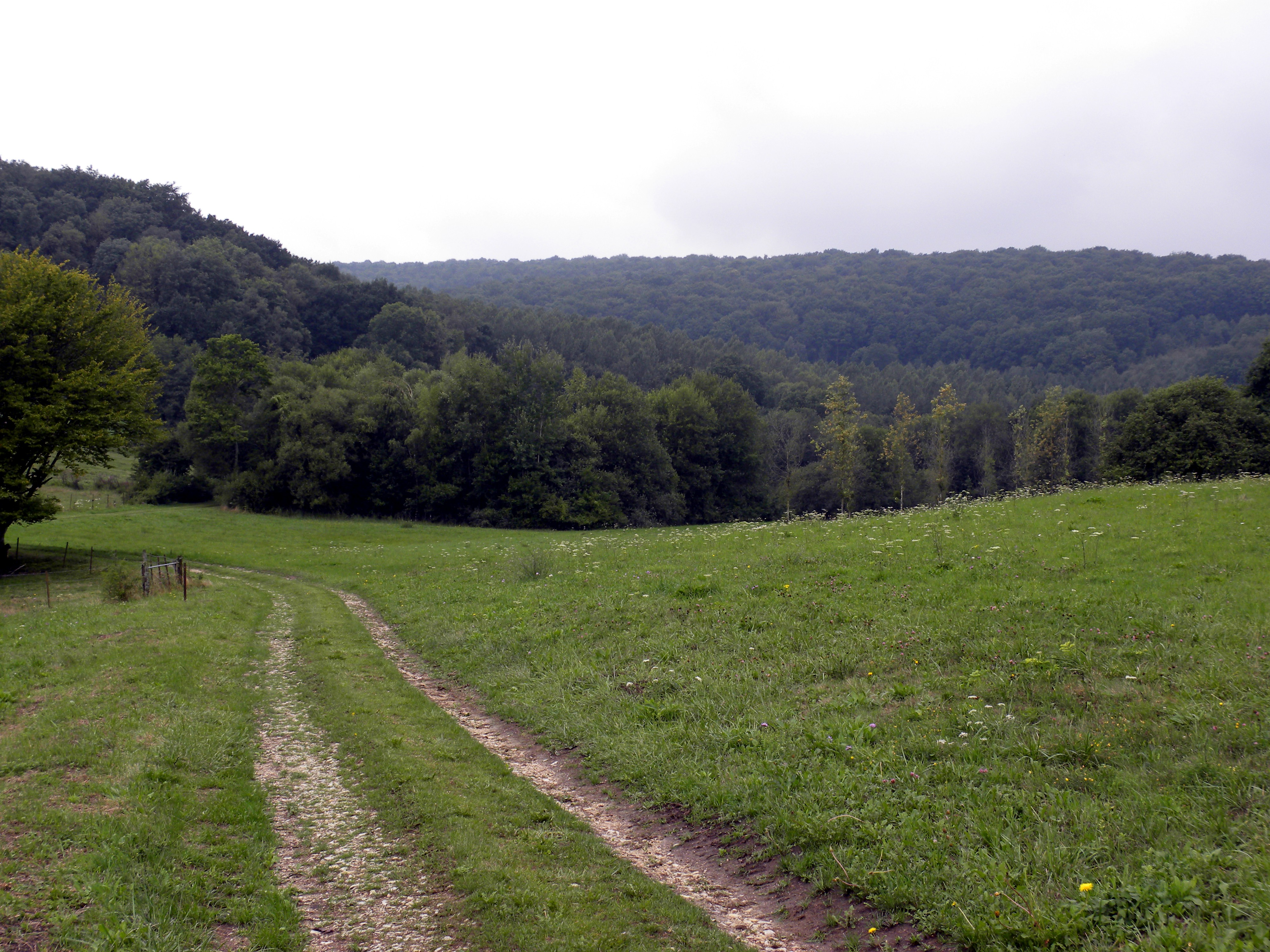
Forest of Argonne in a valley near Chatel-Chéhéry, France, where Sgt. Henry Johnson, known after his heroic battle as the Black Death, and Sgt. Alvin C. York fought in World War I

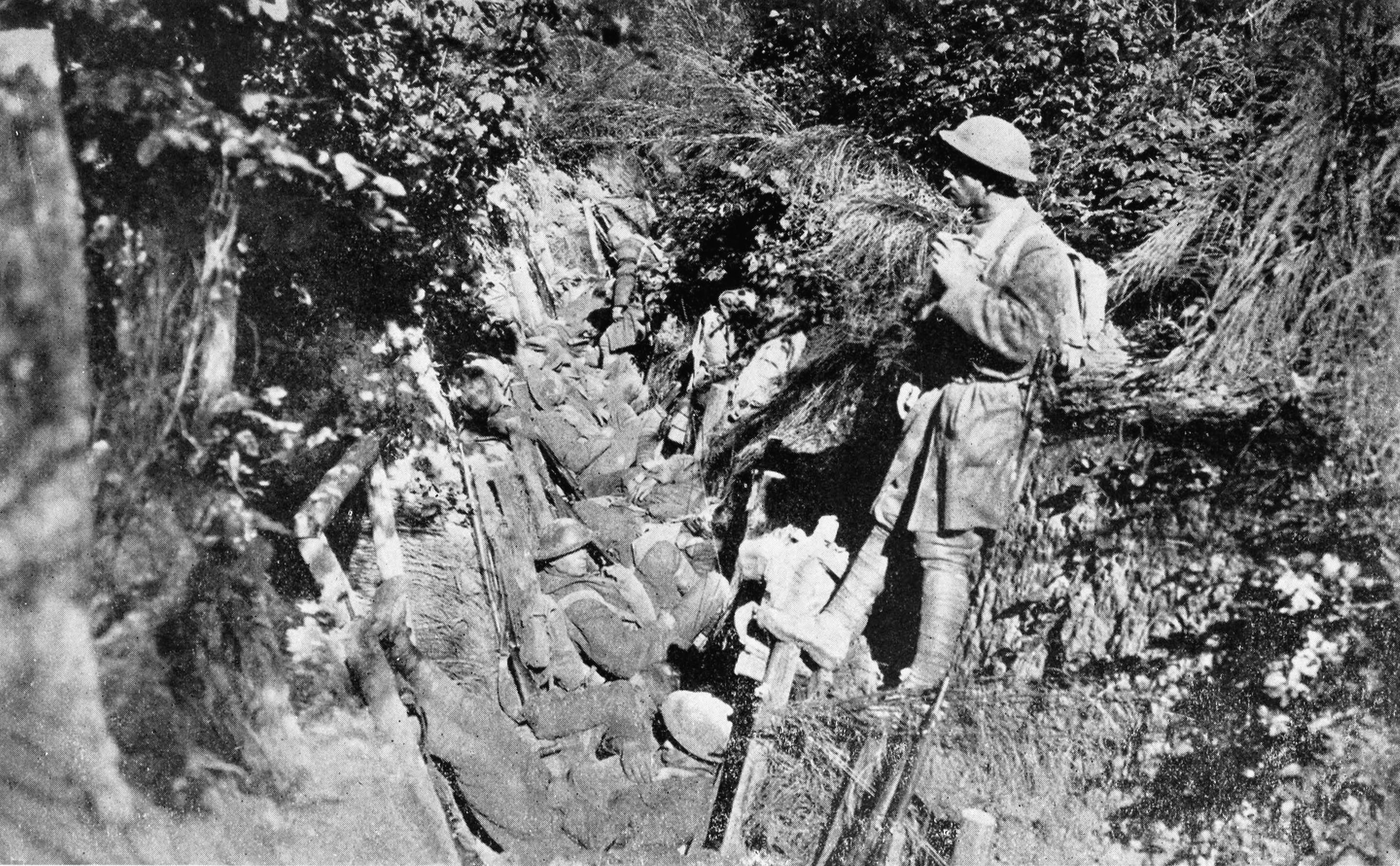
U.S. soldiers in the Argonne Forest resting in a trench, 1918

The Forest of Argonne (French pronunciation: [aʁɡɔn]) is a long strip of mountainous and wild woodland in northeastern France, approximately 200 km (120 mi) east of Paris. The forest measures roughly 65 km (40 mi) long and 15 km (9 mi) wide filled with many small hills and deep valleys formed by water run-off from the Aire and Aisne rivers rarely exceeding more than 200 m (650 ft) in elevation. Following the First World War, the landscape of the forest was forever changed as trench warfare led to parts of the forest being riddled with deep human-made trenches along with craters from explosives. The forest is bordered by the Aisne river on the west and rolling farmland and creeks to the east. The forest is largely oak, chestnut, and pine trees, and ferns cover much of the forest floor. Common animal life consists of wild boar, red deer, roe deer, hares, rabbits, foxes, and wildcat.

== History ==
In 1792, Charles François Dumouriez outmaneuvered the invading forces of the Duke of Brunswick in the forest before the Battle of Valmy.

During World War I, the forest again became the site of intense military action. Bitter fighting between German and Allied units took place here in fall and winter 1914, summer 1915, and fall 1918. During the Meuse–Argonne offensive (1918), several United States Army soldiers earned the Medal of Honor there, including Colonel Nelson Miles Holderman, Major Charles White Whittlesey, Sergeant Alvin C. York, Corporal Harold W. Roberts and William Henry Johnson (a.k.a. "Black Death"), most of them part of the "Lost Battalion". The World War I Montfaucon American Monument consists of a large granite Doric column surmounted by a statue symbolic of Liberty. The monument is located 32 km (20 mi) northwest of Verdun, not far from the Meuse–Argonne American Cemetery and Memorial.

== Points of interest ==
- Arboretum du Petit-Bois
- Chattancourt
- Lachalade Abbey
- Meuse-Argonne American cemetery
- Varennes-en-Argonne

== See also ==
- Argonne Forest, an affluent neighborhood in Atlanta, Georgia
- Argonnenbahn, a light railway operated by the German Army during World War I
- Argonnerwaldlied
- Argonne Forest park, an amusement park in Dayton, Ohio built by a former U.S. soldier as a tribute to his fellow soldiers that never returned from the Argonne Forest in France during World War I
- Meuse–Argonne offensive
