= Alvin C. York Institute =

Location
- 701 North Main Street; Jamestown, Tennessee 38556; United States

Information
- School type: State Public high school
- Motto: Prepare and Excel
- Established: 1926
- Founder: Alvin C. York
- Oversight: Tennessee Department of Education
- Director: John Bush
- Principal: Abbi Dunford
- Staff: 36.48 (FTE)
- Grades: 9-12
- Student to teacher ratio: 13.49
- Hours in school day: 7
- Campus: Rural
- Campus size: 400 acres (160 ha)
- Color: Purple Gold
- Slogan: Home of the Dragons
- Mascot: Dragon
- Accreditation: Accredited by the Southern Association of Colleges and Schools
- USNWR ranking: #105
- Newspaper: Pine Needles
- Yearbook: Mountaineer
- Dedication: To the end that my people of Pall Mall and of Fentress County and the boys and girls of this mountainous section may enjoy the liberating influences and educational advantages which were denied me, I dedicate this institution and my life to its perpetuation, and seek from the American people support in keeping with the great need. -- Sgt. Alvin C. York
- Website: https://www.yaidragons.com/
- Alvin C. York Agricultural Institute Historic District
- U.S. National Register of Historic Places
- U.S. Historic district
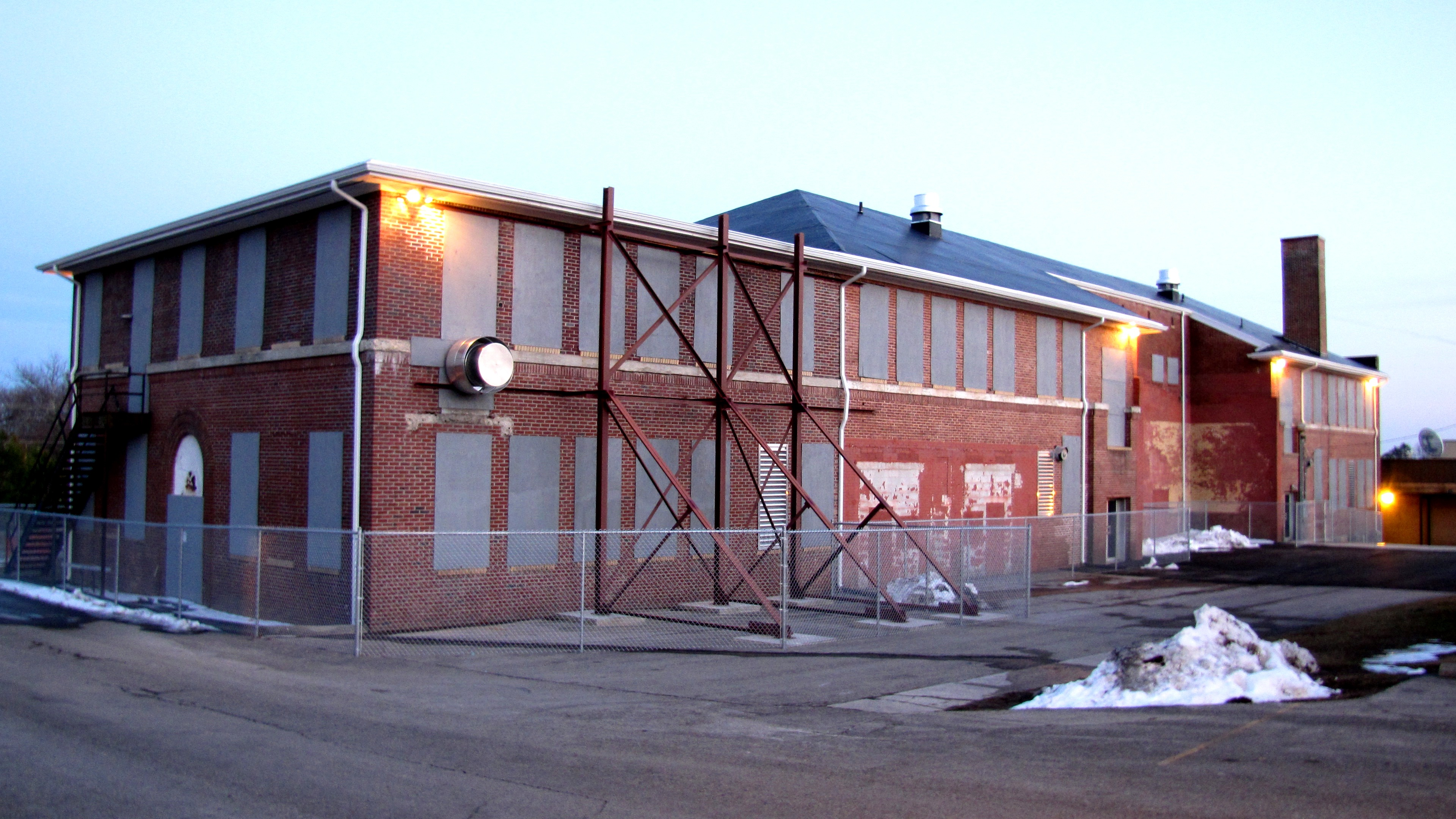
- The older section of York Institute

- Location within Tennessee Location within the United States
- Coordinates: 36°26′40″N 84°56′13″W
- Area: 8 acres (3.2 ha)
- Built: 1927
- Architectural style: Classical Revival
- MPS: Fentress County MPS
- NRHP reference No.: 91001378
- Added to NRHP: September 20, 1991

Alvin C. York Institute, also known as Alvin C. York Agricultural Institute or York Institute, is a public high school in Jamestown, Tennessee, founded as a private agricultural school in 1926 by World War I hero Alvin York and later transferred to the state of Tennessee in 1937, which continues to operate it as a public high school. It is the only comprehensive secondary school in the United States that is financed and operated by a state government.

== History ==
Alvin C. York established the school that carries his name during the 1920s in the county seat of his home county of Fentress. His goal was to give rural children the chance to obtain a high school education. Beginning in 1919 he toured the United States raising funds for the school, using his status as a war hero to get public attention and raising a total of $10,000. He also solicited and received funds from the state legislature, which contributed $50,000, and from Fentress County, which pledged $50,000. Classes began in 1929 and the school operated privately until 1937, when financial pressures related to the Great Depression led York to transfer the school to the state of Tennessee, which continues to operate it as a public school as a living memorial to York.

== Campus ==
The school sits on a campus of over 400 acres (1.6 km^{2}) that is said to be the world's largest public high school campus. The campus is designated as a Tennessee Wildlife Resources Agency wildlife management area and includes a working farm where students participate in managing a herd of Limousin cattle. Five ponds on the campus are used for livestock watering, sport fishing, and waterfowl feeding and nesting.

Campus buildings currently in use include the Main Administration Building (c. 1980), Social Sciences Building (a later addition to the original school), Science Building, Alvin C. York JROTC Building (c. 1940s), and Fentress County Vocational Training Center (c. 1970s).

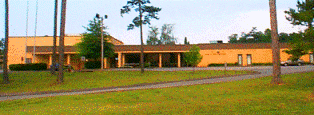
The main administration building today, built in 1980.

The Jamestown Community Center and Jamestown Community Park are located near the school on York Institute land.

=== Historic building ===
The original two-story brick administration building, built in 1928, is the centerpiece of the Alvin C. York Agricultural Institute Historic District, which is listed on the National Register of Historic Places. The school building was replaced with a new building in the 1980s and subsequently has deteriorated. In 2005 the Tennessee Preservation Trust listed it on its yearly list of the state's "most endangered" historic sites.

In January 2008 the Tennessee Department of Education proposed that it be demolished, and estimated the cost of demolition at $3.6 million, while renovation would cost $3.7 million. Due to safety concerns, state officials blocked off access to the old building and all areas within 50 feet (15 m) of the walls, thus preventing the use of four classrooms in the school's current main building, which is adjacent to the original building. On July 15, 2008, an agreement was reached between the state building and education departments and the Sgt. York Patriotic Foundation, which agreed to oversee and fund the restoration of the historic structure. As of January 2010, the building had been stabilized and initial remediation was complete, at a total cost of about $1 million.

== Curriculum ==
The school enrolls students in grades 9 through 12. It operates on a block schedule, in which the fall and spring semesters are each divided into four blocks, and students take four classes each semester. York also offers vocational programs including agriculture, automotive technology, residential construction technology, metal technology, nursing, accounting, and information management systems.

York Institute was one of nine Tennessee school districts to participate in the Appalachian Mathematics and Science Partnership, funded by the National Science Foundation with the goal enhancing science, mathematics and technology education in Appalachian region schools with low socioeconomic status and student achievement.

=== Dual-Enrollment ===
Through the efforts of a local foundation and through cooperation with Roane State Community College, York Institute is able to provide its students with undergraduate-level college coursework free of charge to all students. Classes offered include College Algebra, American History I & II, English Composition I & II, Psychology, Sociology, Spanish, etc. Students enrolled in these courses obtain both college and high-school credit and can earn up to two years worth of college credit.

=== Vocational Certification ===
The York Institute also provides a CNA certification program to all students free of charge. The students can apply for and obtain their CNA licensure after a semester of coursework and clinical observation is completed. The school also provides a classroom and shop area for the Tennessee Technological Center to offer Welding courses at the school site.

== Community Education ==
The Alvin C. York Institute also operates a community education program. The program consists of various classes, events, and resources that are available to the community at no cost. The major goal of this project is to involve parents and community members in educational programs. Community education classes allow the community to become familiar with the school their children or grandchildren attend. A concerted effort is made to enhance the value placed on education. Courses offered range from basic to graduate level courses as well as many arts and crafts courses. Funding for this program is provided by Union Bank of Jamestown.

== Extracurricular activities and clubs ==
Extracurricular clubs and organizations offered at York Institute include:

- Chorus
- Drama
- Journalism
- Art
- Student Council
- JROTC
- Family Career Community Leaders of America (FCCLA)
- Future Business Leaders of America (FBLA)
- Fellowship of Christian Athletes (FCA)
- Student Christian Club
- Health Occupations Students of America (HOSA)
- Scholars' Bowl
- Future Farmers of America (FFA)
- Skills USA
- Envirothon
- Pep Club
- Math Club
- English Club
- Spanish Club
- BETA Club
- Tennessee Scholars
- National Honors Society
- Interact Club
- Future Teachers of America

== Sports ==
- Football
- Boys & Girls Basketball
- Baseball
- Softball
- Boys & Girls Soccer
- Boys & Girls Track
- Boys & Girls Bowling
- Boys & Girls Golf
- Cross Country
- Boys & Girls Wrestling
- Volleyball

== Honors and awards ==
In 1989 York Institute was recognized as a National Blue Ribbon School of Excellence. In 1992 it was one of 140 public secondary schools recognized by Redbook magazine as "America's Best Schools." It was a recipient of a Tennessee Department of Education 2006 Best Practices in Character Education Merit Award.

== Notable alumni ==
- Roger Crouch, astronaut
- Lincoln Davis, U.S. Congressman
