= At Heaven's Gate =

1943 novel by Robert Penn Warren

- First edition (publ. Harcourt Brace)
- Author: Robert Penn Warren
- Publisher: Random House
- Publication date: August 19, 1943

At Heaven's Gate is a 1943 novel by Robert Penn Warren, his second. It was reprinted in New York by New Directions Publishing Corporation in 1985 with ISBN 0-8112-0933-4

== Plot summary ==
Sue Murdock searches for redemption throughout the novel. Her father repeatedly laments his inability to relate to his daughter. Sue rejects his assistance because she believes he is trying to control her. She has a stormy relationship with Jerry Calhoun, who, perhaps because he is profoundly naive and not particularly bright, is unable to understand her. Jerry clings to quaint notions of Southern honor and is respectful of the power and authority Bogan Murdock represents. Therefore, Sue can never be happy with him.

Sue rejects Jerry and soon finds herself with Slim Sarrett, a writer with a room full of pseudo-intellectual friends. Sue falls for Slim, who rejects honor and power in a way Jerry never could. In the end, however, nothing about Slim is real: he is a dedicated liar, deceitful to the last detail. As Sue discovers the depths of his lies — about his past and sexuality — she also discovers that he is not even, in fact, a particularly talented writer.

After rejecting Slim, and his artist's pose, she falls into a tepid relationship with Sweetwater. Sweetwater is a cynic, unlike Jerry, and a realist, unlike Slim. Sweetwater is also profoundly honest and struggles to maintain true to himself. Sweetwater falls in love with Sue, but she never loves him in return.

One can read Sue to represent the Southern lower class, abused and controlled for generations. Who can help the lower class escape its shackles? Not the lower-class man who tastes a bit of success and abandons his class to serve selfish interests, as Jerry does. Not the intellectual, the artist, who poses at everything and is unable to fight for anything. The seduction is great, but the reward is small. Perhaps the honest man, Sweetwater's labor organizer, can save the class he tries to raise up even as he is betrayed and rejected by it. Perhaps Sue knows that Sweetwater's realism and devotion to cause can save her, but she is little interested in it.

== Nashville background ==
At Heaven's Gate can be definitely linked to Warren's residence in Nashville, Tennessee during his time at Vanderbilt University. Scandals surrounding a Nashville bond-trading house, Caldwell & Company, in the 1930s provide a close parallel to some of the machinations of the Murdock empire. Several Caldwell-linked banks were declared insolvent, and the state government itself became embroiled in the matter. Private Porsum is obviously based on Alvin C. York, Tennessee's most famous war hero, although in real life York had nothing to do with the bond scandal. News reports have indicated that in later years Warren acknowledged the link between his story and Nashville events during the Great Depression.
