= 2nd Landwehr Division (German Empire) =

2nd Landwehr Division (2. Landwehr-Division)
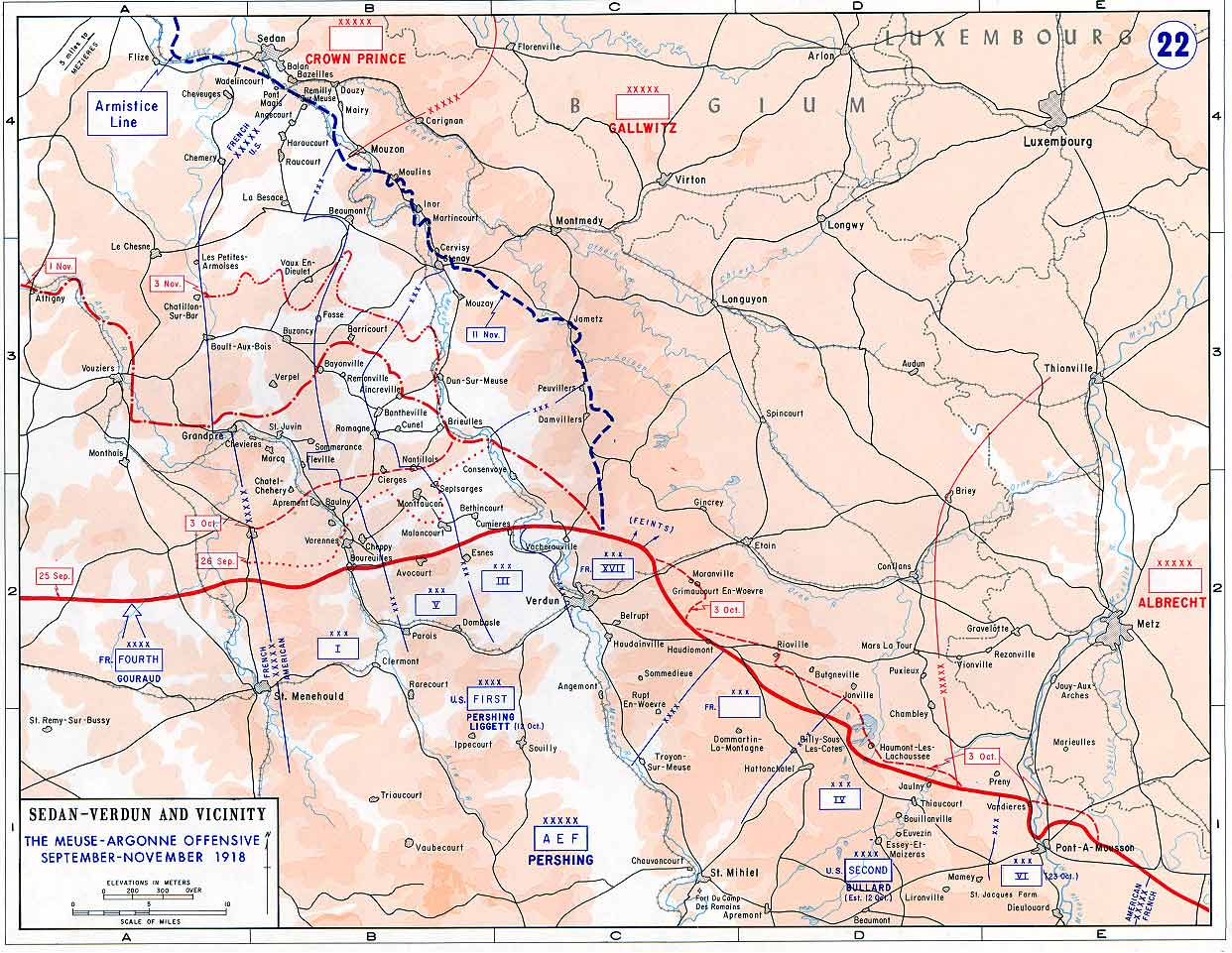
- Meuse-Argonne Offensive, or Battle of the Argonne Forest, - 26 September to 11 November 1918.
- Active: 1914-1919
- Country: Germany
- Branch: Army
- Type: Landwehr infantry
- Size: Approx. 15,000
- Engagements: World War I: Verdun, Meuse-Argonne Offensive

The 2nd Landwehr Division (2. Landwehr-Division) was an infantry division of the Imperial German Army during World War I. It was formed on the mobilization of the German Army in August 1914 under the "Higher Landwehr Commander 2" (Höherer Landwehr-Kommandeur 2). The Landwehr was the third category of the German Army, after the regular Army and the reserves. Thus Landwehr divisions were made up of older soldiers, who had passed from the reserves and were intended primarily for occupation and security duties rather than heavy combat. However, the circumstances of war often changed this.

== Organization at mobilization ==
On mobilization, the Higher Landwehr Commander 2 commanded four mixed Landwehr brigades (gemischte Landwehr-Brigaden), each of which generally included its own infantry, cavalry and artillery. The initial wartime organization was as follows:

- 9. bayerische gemischte Landwehr-Brigade
  - Kgl. Bayerisches 6. Landwehr-Infanterie-Regiment
  - Kgl. Bayerisches 7. Landwehr-Infanterie-Regiment
  - 1. Landwehr-Eskadron/III. Bayerisches Armeekorps
  - 1. Landsturm-Batterie III. Bayerisches Armeekorps
- 43. gemischte Landwehr-Brigade
  - Thüringisches Landwehr-Infanterie-Regiment Nr. 32
  - Kurhessisches Landwehr-Infanterie-Regiment Nr. 83
  - 1. Landwehr-Eskadron/XI. Armeekorps
- 45. gemischte Landwehr-Brigade
  - Kgl. Sächsisches Landwehr-Grenadier-Regiment Nr. 100
  - Kgl. Sächsisches Landwehr-Infanterie-Regiment Nr. 102
  - Landwehr-Eskadron/XII. (1. Kgl. Sächs.) Armeekorps
  - 1. Landsturm-Batterie XII. (1. Kgl. Sächs.) Armeekorps
- 53. gemischte Landwehr-Brigade
  - Kgl. Württembergisches Landwehr-Infanterie-Regiment Nr. 124
  - Kgl. Württembergisches Landwehr-Infanterie-Regiment Nr. 125
  - 3. Landwehr-Eskadron/XIII. (Kgl. Württ.) Armeekorps
  - Landsturm-Batterie XIII. (Kgl. Württ.) Armeekorps

The 9th Bavarian Mixed Landwehr Brigade was raised in the northern part of the Kingdom of Bavaria, in the III Bavarian Corps area. The 43rd Mixed Landwehr Brigade was from the XI Corps area (the Province of Hesse-Nassau and the smaller Thuringian states). The 45th Mixed Landwehr Brigade was raised in the Kingdom of Saxony. The 53rd Mixed Landwehr Brigade was raised in the Kingdom of Württemberg.

== 1915 reorganization ==
In late 1915, the division was reorganized, with most non-Württemberg elements being transferred to other units, and was officially redesignated as the 2nd Landwehr Division on December 19, 1915. The order of battle of the division on November 9, 1915, was as follows:

- 53. Landwehr-Brigade
  - Württembergisches Landwehr-Infanterie-Regiment Nr. 124
  - Württembergisches Landwehr-Infanterie-Regiment Nr. 125
- 54. Landwehr-Brigade
  - Württembergisches Landwehr-Infanterie-Regiment Nr. 120
  - Württembergisches Landwehr-Infanterie-Regiment Nr. 122
- 3. Landwehr-Eskadron/XIII. (Kgl. Württ.) Armeekorps
- Landwehr-Feldartillerie-Regiment Nr. 2
- Minenwerfer-Kompanie Nr. 302
- 2. Landwehr-Pionier-Kompanie/I. Bayerisches Armeekorps
- 1. Landsturm-Pionier-Kompanie/VII. Armeekorps

== Combat chronicle ==
Although not officially designated as a Royal Württemberg formation, the 2nd Landwehr Division was wholly made up of Württemberg elements by early 1916. The division was sent to the front near Verdun, where it took part in the major battle that began there in 1916. The division remained involved in positional warfare on the Verdun front through 1916 and 1917. In late 1917 and 1918, it participated in the fighting in the Argonne Forest. Late in the war, it faced the American offensive in the region.

== Late World War I organization ==
Divisions underwent many changes during the war, with regiments moving from division to division, and some being destroyed and rebuilt. During the war, most divisions became triangular - one infantry brigade with three infantry regiments rather than two infantry brigades of two regiments (a "square division"). In the case of Landwehr divisions, the mixed Landwehr brigades were converted to regular infantry brigades before being triangularized, and were often used to form new units. The 2nd Landwehr Division's order of battle on January 5, 1918, was as follows:

- 54. Landwehr-Brigade
  - Württembergisches Landwehr-Infanterie-Regiment Nr. 120
  - Württembergisches Landwehr-Infanterie-Regiment Nr. 122
  - Württembergisches Landwehr-Infanterie-Regiment Nr. 125
- 4.Eskadron/Ulanen-Regiment König Wilhelm I (2. Württembergisches) Nr. 20
- Artillerie-Kommandeur 148:
  - Landwehr-Feldartillerie-Regiment Nr. 2
- Stab Pionier-Bataillon Nr. 402:
  - 1.Landwehr-Kompanie/Württembergisches Pionier-Bataillon Nr. 13
  - 5.Landwehr-Kompanie/Württembergisches Pionier-Bataillon Nr. 13
  - Minenwerfer-Kompanie Nr. 302
- Divisions-Nachrichten-Kommandeur 502
