= Erich-Weinert-Ensemble =

Army ensemble of the German Democratic Republic

- Origin: Berlin, German Democratic Republic
- Genres: Folk, Military Marches, Classical, Cabaret
- Years active: 1950–1991
- Spinoff of: Kasernierte Volkspolizei Folk Art Ensemble

The Erich-Weinert-Ensemble was a professional army ensemble of the National People's Army (NVA) of the German Democratic Republic. The ensemble consisted of a male choir, a ballet, an orchestra, a cabaret, soloists, dramaturges, conductors, directors, choreographers and technical and organizational staff. The ensemble was based in Berlin-Biesdorf. The ensemble was named after Erich Weinert, a German communist writer.

== History ==
On 15 July 1950, a folk art ensemble was set up by Kasernierte Volkspolizei. It was handed over to the NVA in 1956, where it was renamed the Erich-Weinert-Ensemble.

The ensemble made a name for itself both locally and internationally due to the diversity of its repertoire, the cultivation of the traditions of the German folk song and military songs. The ensemble toured the People's Republic of China and the Soviet Union.

In 1989, the ensemble was transferred to the Bundeswehr and was spun off on 30 June 1991 by order of the German Bundestag. The ensemble was financed by the Federal Defense Ministry of Germany until 1994.
