= Chatel-Chéhéry =

- Commune
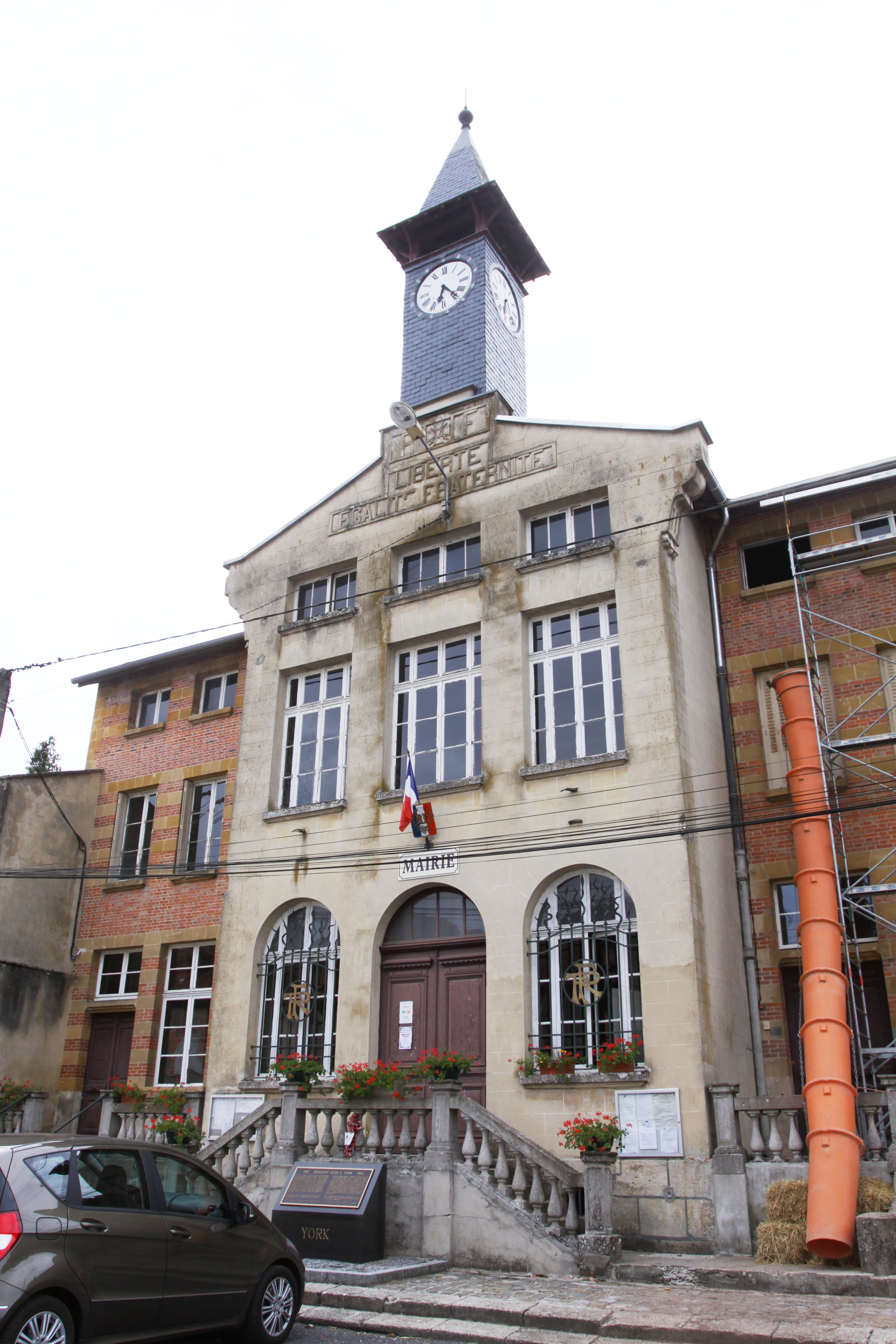
- The town hall in Chatel-Chéhéry

- Coat of arms
- Location of Chatel-Chéhéry
- Location within France Location within Grand Est
- Coordinates: 49°17′02″N 4°57′18″E
- Country: France
- Region: Grand Est
- Department: Ardennes
- Arrondissement: Vouziers
- Canton: Attigny
- Intercommunality: Argonne Ardennaise

Government
  - Mayor (2020–2026): Roland Destenay
- Area^{1}: 16.08 km^{2} (6.21 sq mi)
- Highest elevation: 246 m (807 ft)
- Lowest elevation: 129 m (423 ft)
- Population (2023): 125
  - Density: 7.77/km^{2} (20.1/sq mi)
- Time zone: UTC+01:00 (CET)
  - Summer (DST): UTC+02:00 (CEST)
- INSEE/Postal code: 08109 /08250
- ^{1} French Land Register data, which excludes lakes, ponds, glaciers > 1 km^{2} (0.386 sq mi or 247 acres) and river estuaries.

Chatel-Chéhéry (French pronunciation: [ʃatɛl ʃe.eʁi]) is a commune in the Ardennes department and Grand Est region of north-eastern France.

== Population ==
Historical population
Year	Pop.	±% p.a.
1968	279	—
1975	229	−2.78%
1982	183	−3.15%
1990	193	+0.67%
1999	140	−3.50%
2007	161	+1.76%
2012	156	−0.63%
2017	146	−1.32%
2023	125	−2.56%
Source: INSEE

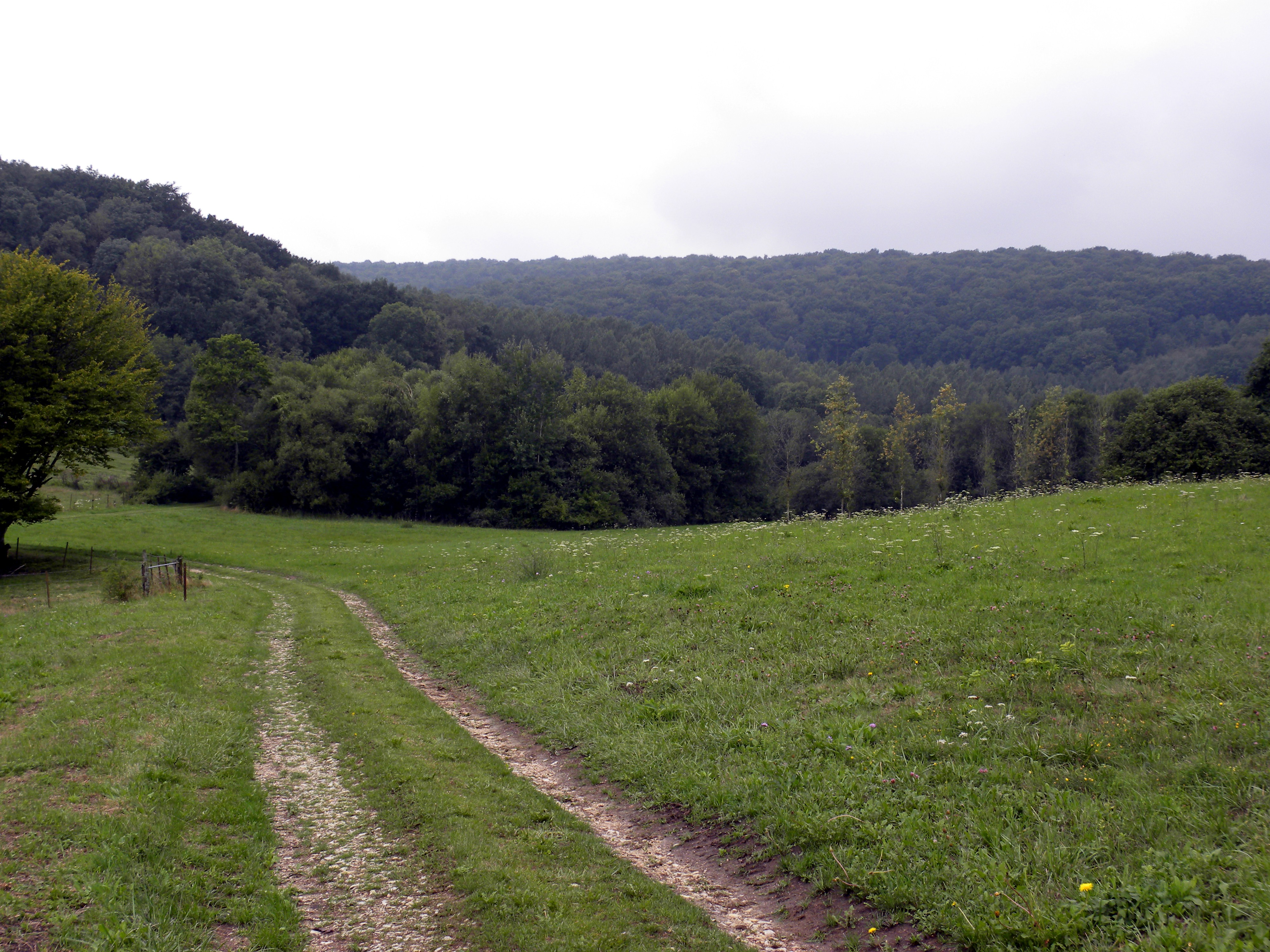
A valley near Chatel-Chéhéry, the scene of Sergeant Alvin York's heroic actions in WWI

== See also ==
- Communes of the Ardennes department
