= Bellevue =

Bellevue means "beautiful view" in French.

Bellevue or Belle Vue may refer to:

== Places ==
=== Australia ===
- Bellevue, Queensland
- Bellevue, Western Australia
- Bellevue Hill, New South Wales

=== Canada ===
- Bellevue, Alberta
- Bellevue, Newfoundland and Labrador
  - Bellevue (electoral district)
- Bellevue, Ontario, a community in Kawartha Lakes, Ontario
- Sainte-Anne-de-Bellevue, Quebec
- St. Isidore de Bellevue, Saskatchewan
- Bellevue, Edmonton, a neighbourhood in Edmonton, Alberta
- Bellevue Park, Sault Ste. Marie, Ontario

=== Denmark ===
- Bellevue Beach, a beach in Klampenborg north of Copenhagen
- Bellevue Beach, Aarhus, a beach in Risskov, Aarhus

=== France ===
- Bellevue, French Guiana, a village of French Guiana

=== Germany ===
- Bellevue (Schweinfurt), a neighborhood of Schweinfurt, a city in Bavaria

=== Isle of Man ===
- Bellevue, alternative name for Belle Vue Halt, an intermediate stopping place for the Manx Electric Railway near Ballure

=== New Zealand ===
- Bellevue, New Zealand, suburb of Tauranga, in the Bay of Plenty Region

=== Norway ===
- Bellevue (Kristiansand), a neighborhood in the city of Kristiansand in Vest-Agder county, Norway

=== South Africa ===
- Bellevue, Gauteng, a suburb of Johannesburg

=== Sweden ===
- Bellevue (Stockholm), a park in Stockholm
- Bellevue, Malmö, a suburb
- Bellevue (Gothenburg), an area in Gamlestan, Gothenburg

=== Switzerland ===
- Bellevue, Switzerland, a municipality in the canton of Geneva
- Bellevue is an alternative name for Bellevueplatz, a town square in Zurich

=== United Kingdom ===
- Bellevue, Belfast
- Bellevue, Edinburgh, a district in the north-east of New Town, Edinburgh

=== United States ===
- Bellvue, Colorado
- Bellevue, Delaware
- Bellevue (Macon), community in Macon, Georgia
- Bellevue, Idaho
- Bellevue, Illinois
- Bellevue, Iowa
- Bellevue, Kentucky
- Bellevue, Bossier Parish, Louisiana
- Bellevue, Calcasieu Parish, Louisiana
- Bellevue, Caldwell Parish, Louisiana
- Bellevue, Plaquemines Parish, Louisiana
- Bellevue, Maryland
- Bellevue, Michigan
- Bellevue, Richmond, a neighborhood of Richmond, Virginia
- Bellevue Township, Michigan
- Bellevue Township, Minnesota
- Bellevue, Mississippi
- Bellevue, Nebraska
- Bellevue, Erie County, New York
- Bellevue, Schenectady, New York
- Bellevue, Ohio
- Bellevue, Oregon
- Bellevue, Pennsylvania, a suburb of Pittsburgh
- Bellevue, York County, Pennsylvania
- Bellevue, Tennessee
- Bellevue, Texas
- Bellevue, now Pintura, Utah
- Bellevue, Washington, a city in the Seattle metropolitan area
- Bellevue (Washington, D.C.)
- Bellevue, Wisconsin
- Bellevue, Saint Croix, U.S. Virgin Islands
- Bellevue, Saint Thomas, U.S. Virgin Islands

== Buildings and institutions ==
- The Bellevue Hotel (disambiguation), a list of hotels by that name

=== Australia ===
- Bellevue, Glebe, an historic house in Sydney, New South Wales

=== Denmark ===
- Bellevue Teatret, a theatre located next to the Bellevue Beach in Copenhagen

=== France ===
- Bellevue Palace (France), a small château built for Madame de Pompadour near Paris in 1750 overlooking the Seine and demolished in 1823

=== Germany ===
- Schloss Bellevue, a palace in Berlin which has been the official residence of the President of Germany since 1994

=== India ===
- Belle Vue Clinic, Kolkata, India

=== Jamaica ===
- Bellevue Hospital, Jamaica, Jamaica

=== Lebanon ===
- Bellevue Medical Center, Lebanon

=== Netherlands ===
- Theater Bellevue, Amsterdam

=== Norway ===
- Bellevue, the sports stadium of SK Sprint-Jeløy

=== Philippines ===
- Bellevue Theater, Manila, Philippines

=== United States ===
- Bellevue Plantation, a historic house in Tallahassee, Florida
- Bellevue (LaGrange, Georgia), a historic mansion
- Bellevue (Newport, Kentucky), a historic home
- Bellevue (Accokeek, Maryland), a historic plantation house
- Bellevue (Pascagoula, Mississippi), a historic home
- Bellevue University, Bellevue, Nebraska
- Bellevue Medical Center, Nebraska
- Bellevue Hospital Center, New York City, the oldest public hospital in the United States
- Bellevue (Morganton, North Carolina), a historic home
- Bellevue (Kingston, Ohio), a historic farmhouse
- Bellevue Baptist Church, Memphis, Tennessee
- Bellevue (Batesville, Virginia), a historic home
- Bellevue (Goode, Virginia), a historic home
- Bellevue College, Bellevue, Washington

== Music ==
- Bellevue, album by the Bobby Lees
- Bellevue, album by Misteur Valaire
- Bellevue, album by Henrik Strube
- "Bellevue", song by GNR (band)
- "Bellevue", song by Tobias Rahim, from Vulkanø (2025)

== Transportation ==
- Belle Vue railway station, in Manchester, England
- Bellevue Transit Center, a bus hub and light rail station in Bellevue, Washington, United States
- Berlin Bellevue station, a station on the Berlin S-Bahn railway network
- Bellevue Station (France), railroad station in Meudon, France
- Bellevue station (MBTA), in West Roxbury, Massachusetts, United States

== Other ==
- Bellevue Cemetery, a cemetery in Lawrence, Massachusetts
- Bellevue (TV series), a Canadian drama series that debuted in 2017
- Bellevue Literary Press, an American publisher
- Bellevue, a fictional town in Sacred videogame.

== See also ==
- Belleview (disambiguation)
- Bellevue State Park (disambiguation)
- Belle Vue (disambiguation)
- Belle Vue Park (disambiguation)
- Charles B. DeBellevue
