= Belleview =

Belleview can refer to:

- Belleview (Middletown, Delaware), listed on the National Register of Historic Places listings in southern New Castle County, Delaware
- Belleview (Harrods Creek, Kentucky), listed on the National Register of Historic Places listings in Jefferson County, Kentucky
- Belleview (Ridgeway, Virginia), listed on the National Register of Historic Places listings in Henry County, Virginia
- Belleview, California (disambiguation)
  - Belleview, Humboldt County, California, unincorporated community
  - Belleview, Tuolumne County, California, unincorporated community
- Belleview, Florida, city
- Belleview, Indiana, unincorporated community
- Belleview, Kentucky, unincorporated community and CDP
- Belleview, Missouri, unincorporated community
- Belleview-Biltmore Hotel, Belleair, Florida
- Belleview station, a light rail station in Denver, Colorado

== See also ==
- Bellevue (disambiguation)
- Belle Vue (disambiguation)
- Belle vie (disambiguation)
