= Belle Vue Park (disambiguation) =

Belle Vue Park may refer to any of the following:

== United Kingdom ==
- Belle Vue Park, park in Newport, Wales
- Belle Vue Park (Stockton-on-Tees), former greyhound racing stadium in Stockton-on-Tees, England
- Belle Vue Park (Lowestoft), site of a Royal Naval Patrol Service memorial in Lowestoft, England

== See also ==
- Belle Vue (disambiguation)
- Bellevue State Park (disambiguation)
- Bellevue Park (disambiguation)
- Bellevue (disambiguation)
