= Bellevue, U.S. Virgin Islands =

Bellevue, U.S. Virgin Islands may refer to:

- Bellevue, Saint Croix, U.S. Virgin Islands
- Bellevue, Saint Thomas, U.S. Virgin Islands
