= Bellevue, United States Virgin Islands =

Bellevue, United States Virgin Islands may refer to:

- Bellevue, Saint Croix, United States Virgin Islands
- Bellevue, Saint Thomas, United States Virgin Islands
