= Batesville Historic District =

Batesville Historic District may refer to:

- Batesville Commercial Historic District, Batesville, Arkansas, listed on the NRHP in Arkansas
- Batesville East Main Historic District, Batesville, Arkansas, listed on the NRHP in Arkansas
- Batesville Historic District (Batesville, Mississippi), listed on the NRHP in Mississippi
- Batesville Historic District (Batesville, Virginia), listed on the NRHP in Virginia
