= Virginia Center for the Creative Arts =

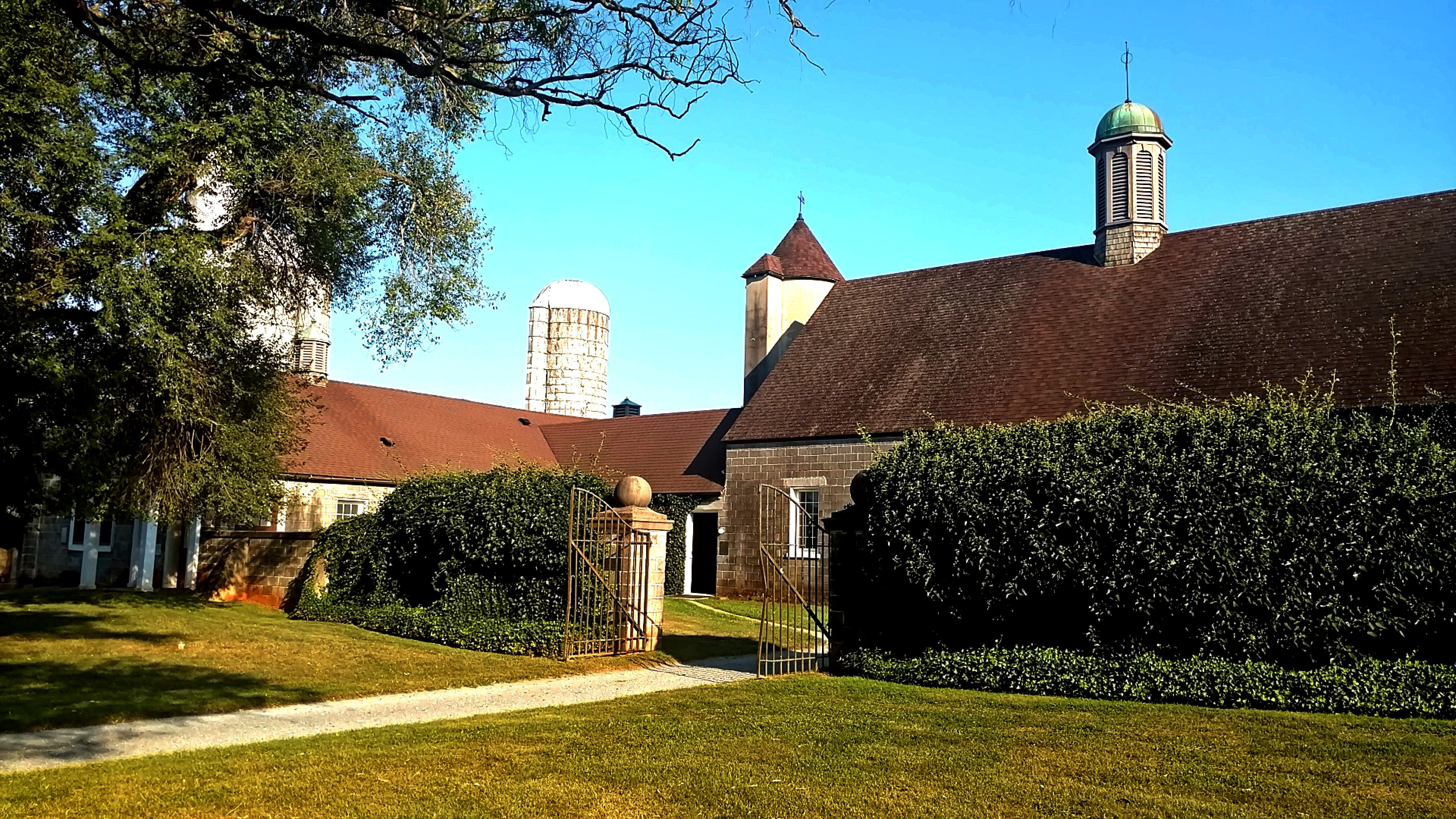
- Studio Barn at VCCA

Location
- Amherst, Virginia; 37.543233°N 79.077113°W

Information
- Type: Private
- Established: 1971

The Virginia Center for the Creative Arts (VCCA) is a residential artist community in Amherst, Virginia, USA. Since 1971, VCCA has offered residencies of varying lengths with flexible scheduling for international artists, writers, and composers at its working retreat in the foothills of Virginia's Blue Ridge Mountains. VCCA is among the nation's largest artist residency programs, and since 2004, has also offered workshops and retreats at its studio center in Southwest France, Le Moulin à Nef.

VCCA fellowships aim to intensify creativity by freeing more than 400 artists a year, up to 25 at a time, from the disruptions of everyday life. Fellows have a private bedroom and studio, with three meals a day. Fellowships have been awarded to more than 6,000 writers, composers, and visual artists nationwide and from 63 different countries. Honors accorded to VCCA Fellows have included MacArthur "Genius Grants", National Book Awards, Pulitzer Prizes, and fellowships from the National Endowment for the Arts, the American Academy in Rome, and the Guggenheim and Pollock-Krasner Foundations.

== History ==
The Virginia writers Nancy Hale and Elizabeth Coles Langhorne founded VCCA in 1971. Hale, the first female reporter for The New York Times and a frequent New Yorker contributor, testified before the Virginia Commission for the Arts and the Humanities that "if Virginia really wanted to further the arts, it could do so easily, moreover cheaply, by purchasing an abandoned motel and staffing it for writers to write in—feeding them and seeing that they were uninterrupted."

The remark resonated with Langhorne, but her 1968 residency at the MacDowell Colony in New Hampshire suggested a considerably more elegant approach. She and Hale collaborated with Maria Miller and Edith Newcomb who donated the use of her Wavertree Farm, near Charlottesville, Virginia. Included on the original board were William Massey Smith, Alex von Thelen, Peter Taylor, and MacDowell Colony's longtime director, George Kendall.

The first sixteen Fellows arrived in June 1971, and the first international Fellows arrived from the UK and Korea the following year.

Repeated dislocations marked the early years of the VCCA. In 1973 Edith Newcomb's daughters reclaimed Wavertree Farm, but in 1974 Rosamund Frost Lowell donated the use of historic Prospect Hill estate east of Charlottesville. That year VCCA received its first challenge grant from the National Endowment for the Arts.

Expansion restrictions imposed by the National Register of Historic Places would convince the VCCA Board to close Prospect Hill. Then, the VCCA executive directorship was awarded to Willam "Bill" E. Smart (1933–2019), a VCCA Fellow and a professor at Sweet Briar College near Amherst, who would direct VCCA for nearly two decades.

Langhorne urged Smart to arrange two VCCA residency sessions with Sweet Briar College in 1976, which led to a long-term lease of Sweet Briar's nearby 400-acre Mount San Angelo estate in 1976, an agreement made by Sweet Briar President Harold Whiteman and VCCA Board President Jane Camp. VCCA become the only artist community in America directly affiliated with an institution of higher learning. In time, the lease was expanded to automatic 15-year options. VCCA Fellows periodically teach at Sweet Briar and benefit from its academic, cultural and athletic facilities.

Elizabeth Taylor Warner and William Styron were the honorary chairs for VCCA's tenth birthday at New York City's Harold Reed Gallery in 1981. That year also witnessed the opening of the new Mt. San Angelo residence, designed specifically as a year-round residence for up to 24 Fellows.

In 1982 VCCA assumed responsibility for the annual Virginia Prize for Poetry and Fiction, then one of the largest such American awards, alternating yearly between poetry and fiction, with an $8000 first prize and a $5000 second prize. The first VCCA art auction was hosted by Senator John Warner and William Styron in 1983 at the Gallery of the Arts Club in Washington, DC under the patronage of Virginia Governor Charles Robb and his wife Lynda Johnson Robb.

In 1984 VCCA and Associated University Presses released what was termed the first work published by an artists' community: From Mt. San Angelo: Stories, Poems and Essays. In 1989 VCCA Fellow John Casey's novel Spartina took the National Book Award.

In 1993 VCCA became a founding member of Res Artis, the Netherlands-based International Association of Residential Arts Centres. VCCA exchanges had come to include the Oberpfälzer Künstlerhaus, Salzburg's Künstlerhaus, Jerusalem's Mishkeot Shana'anim, London's Delfina Studios and Moscow's Kolodzei Art Foundation.

In 1990 VCCA had been one of the 18 founding members of the Alliance of Artists Communities spawned by the MacArthur Foundation's 1990 "Special Initiative on Artists' Colonies, Communities, and Residencies." In 1996 it hosted a conference on "Sustaining America's Artists", leading to the "Hedge-Apple Initiative" seeking just compensation of creative workers.

After Charlene (Suny) Monk was appointed as executive director in 1997, VCCA garnered further awards, including the 2000 Governor's Award in the Arts and National Book Awards for Fellows Alice McDermott (Charming Billy) and Ha Jin (Waiting). "Constructed residencies" have specifically fostered cross-fertilization of genres. VCCA has partnered with the Woodhull Institute for Ethical Leadership to provide writers with workshops on increasing their readership.

As of 2010 there had been more than 4,500 VCCA Fellows, and exchanges with 350 artist from 62 countries; VCCA's international exchange program is the oldest and largest of its kind in America.

== Mount San Angelo ==
Mount San Angelo is an estate in Central Virginia that originally included a villa and gardens with more than 70 varieties of trees and shrubs, including Chinese chestnut, weeping hemlock, magnolia, mahonia, dogwood, copper beech, pink horse chestnut, spruce, crape myrtle, columbine and chrysanthemum. During the American Civil War, the estate owner, Elizabeth "Lily" Mosby had traveled to Europe where she admired Italian architecture. She brought architect Thomas Eastlock from England to create the original 1870 Italianate villa. Upon her death, she willed the estate, then called Mount Saint Angelo, to the legally nonexistent Catholic Sisters of Lynchburg, and so the property reverted to her brother. At his death, the estate transferred to Elizabeth Mosby's sister, Indiana Fletcher Williams, founder of Sweet Briar College. In 1909 the house was remodeled into a Georgian Revival mansion. After 1920, a lake and a sunken boxwood garden—with a waterlily pool edged with peonies, iris and roses—were installed. Installation of a 13,000-square-foot (1,200 m^{2}) Normandy-style barn complex, overseer's cottage and tennis courts, as well as fruit and vegetable gardens, and the name change to Mount San Angelo occurred after 1932. Sweet Briar College purchased the property in 1968.

VCCA Fellows were in residence when a fire destroyed the mansion on July 17, 1979. During the two years it took for the residence to be replaced, Fellows lived and worked in the barn complex, and with emergency help from the National Endowment for the Arts, VCCA established the Phoenix Fund. In June 2020, VCCA purchased the 412-acre Mount San Angelo estate from Sweet Briar College.

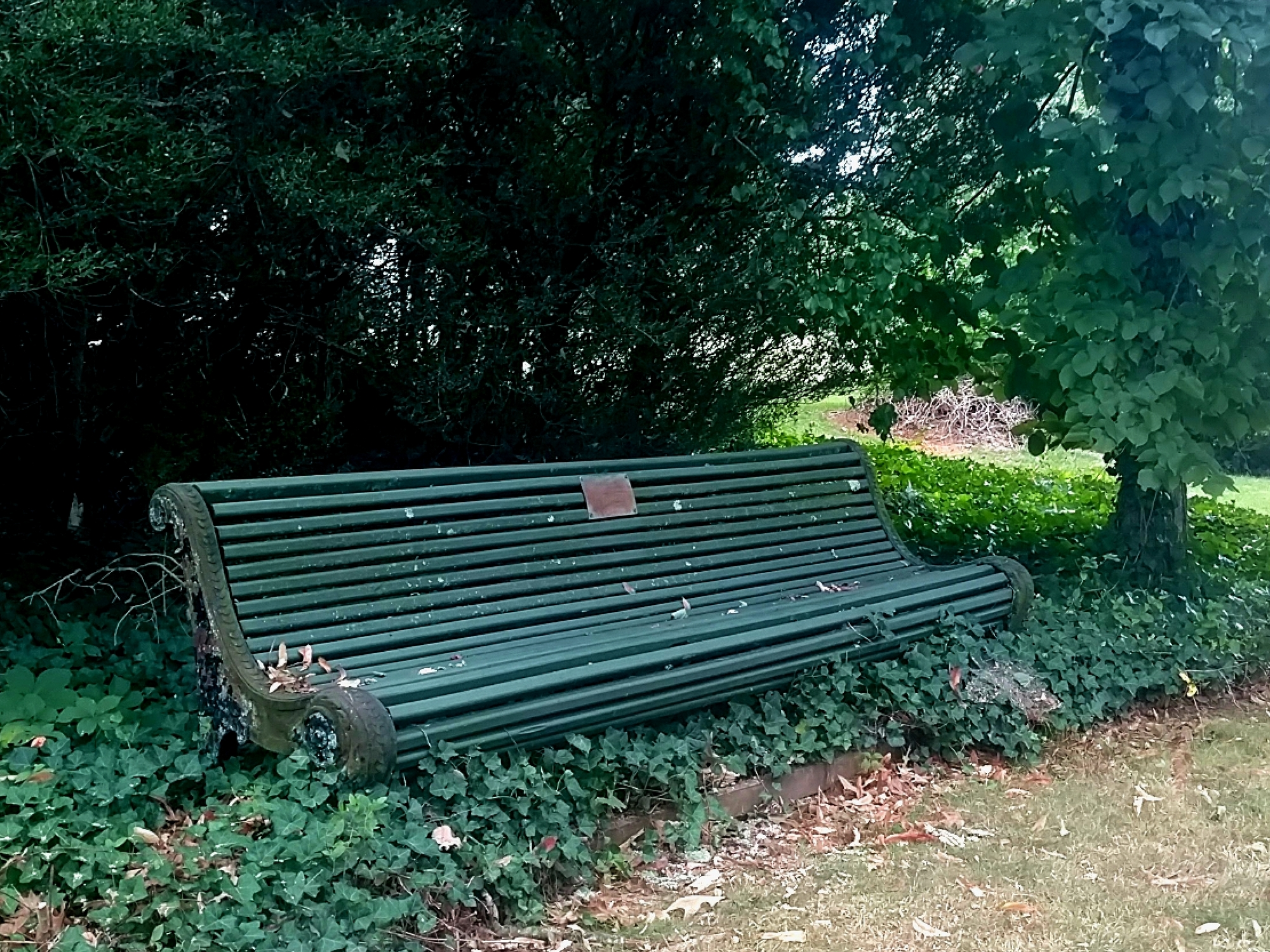
Pasternak Bench at VCCA, a gift to VCCA from the Russian writers colony Peredelkino.

=== The Pasternak Bench ===
Situated on the grounds of VCCA is the 1,000-pound cast-iron "Pasternak Bench", which was transported from the Russian artist colony Peredelkino to Mount San Angelo in 1991. A gift of the Literary Fund of the Russian Federation of the Soviet Writers Union, the bench originally stood near the home of Nobel Prize-winning novelist, Boris Pasternak, who often visited it. The famed bench was known to have been visited by other residents of the Pereldelkino art colony, including the renowned authors Isaac Babel, Aleksandr Solzhenitsyn, Andrei Voznesensky, and Yevgeny Yevtushenko.

== VCCA-France: Le Moulin à Nef ==
VCCA is one of only three artists' communities with a studio center overseas.

The seed of "VCCA-France" was planted by Alain and Lucy Delsol in 1994 when they invited a group of Denver, Colorado artists to spend two weeks working in the village of Auvillar, on the Garonne between Toulouse and Bordeaux. Some artists stayed with families; others had both their lodgings and their studio at the village's Maison Vielhezcases, named for the theatre director who once owned it.

The visit was such a success that it became the yearly "Auvill'art" tradition, attracting funding from the Donnell-Kay Foundation.

In 1999, the foundation bought land, including three decrepit buildings and an overgrown vineyard, in Auvillar's old port neighborhood. The property was dubbed the "Moulin à Nef" or "floating mill". Such mills, which Procopius wrote, were first used by the Romans to maintain flour production during a land siege, had swarmed European rivers such as the Garonne for many centuries; 'Altivilaris', as Auvillar was known in the earliest 11th-century references, was a hub for commercial waterway shipping, and this helped the village to gain renown during the 18th and 19th centuries for its faience, tin-glazed earthenware that simulated Chinese porcelain.

The largest of the Foundation's three buildings, destined to contain a ceramics atelier and several other studios, was called "La Ceba" after "La ceba d'Aoubila", the trademark floral motif of the old Auvillar faience-makers. A second building, containing offices and library, was called "La Cloucado do Molin" after "La Cloucado Marcabrun", the Occitan literary clique founded by Frédéric Mistral and friends: seven félibres, latter-day troubadours, who inaugurated Auvillar's yearly festival of Saint Noé as part of their homage to their native Gascony.

In 2000, having received permits to restore the Ceba and the Cloucado, the Foundation launched the Cultural Exchange Center of Auvillar (CECA), an American nonprofit chartered to finish construction, establish pilot programs, interact with American contacts, and find an appropriate institution to own and run the Moulin à Nef. In 2001 came the Association Auvill'art (AAA), a French nonprofit to interact with French contacts. The Auvillar building crews proceeded so rapidly that by June 2001 the architect, Didier Médale, could conduct the final inspection of both the Ceba and the Cloucado. During the next three years the Moulin à Nef's exchanges came to include not only painting, drawing, sculpture, ceramics, literature, drama and musical composition but also filmmaking, a film festival, folk and ballet dancing, calligraphy, handicrafts, digital photography and gastronomy. There were adult and youth exchange programs with a number of educational institutions.

Early in 2003 the Foundation sent out a circular to interested organizations it deemed candidates to inherit the Moulin à Nef. The following April, the choice of VCCA was announced, and VCCA Fellows first appeared in Auvillar in June 2004, guided by VCCA Director of Artist Services Sheila Gulley Pleasants and her husband, Program Director Craig Pleasants.

Ownership of the Moulin à Nef was formally transferred to VCCA on December 29, 2004; the formation of the French nonprofit VCCA-France in 2007 made it an autonomous satellite of VCCA. Its current Resident Director is Cheryl Fortier. By the summer of 2010, 86 Fellows had completed their residencies, and collaboration with academic institutions such as Yale's Institute of Studio Studies was intensifying.

VCCA's French connection became even firmer when VCCA Advisory Council Member Cy Twombly became the first American invited to do a permanent installation at the Louvre, painting the ceiling of the Salle des Bronzes with the assistance of VCCA Fellow Barbara Crawford.

== Current VCCA Programs ==
Fully endowed VCCA residencies now include the Komaki Fellowship, the Ann Elder Bestor Memorial Fellowship, the Jane Geuting Camp Fellowship, the Columbus School for Girls Endowment, the Alonzo Davis Fellowship, the Goldfarb Family Fellowship, the Phillip and Eric Heiner Endowed Residency, the Patricia and Jerre Mangione Fellowship Fund, the Endowed Memorials Fund, the Elizabeth Ireland Graves Foundation, and the Karen Shea Silverman Endowed Fellowship. Since 2003 VCCA has awarded the Wachtmeister Award. Further fellowship sponsors include the Morris and Gwendolyn Cafritz Foundation, the Geraldine R. Dodge Foundation, the Harry D. Forsyth Fellowship for Visual Arts, the Heinz Endowments, the Mid Atlantic Arts Foundation, the Montana Fellowship, the Richard S. Reynolds Foundation, Sweet Briar College, Virginia Commonwealth University, the UNESCO Aschberg Bursaries, the NEA for the Cave Canem Residency, and the Bama Works Fund of the Dave Matthews Band.

VCCA's commitment to democratic meritocracy extends to patronage as well as creativity: the Legacy Society and "Fund a Fellow" have allowed many people from all walks of life to become art patrons in the classical sense.
