= 1919 Port Arthur riot =

- Part of Red Summer
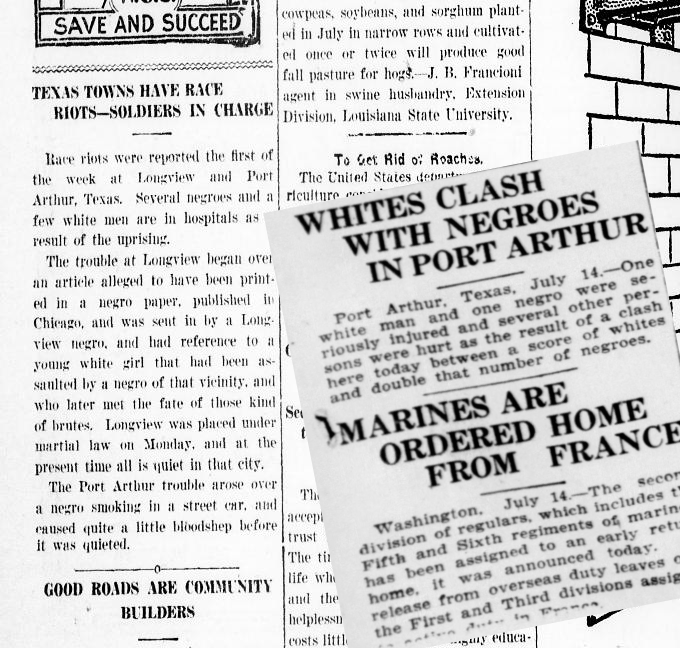
- July US News coverage of the Port Arthur riot 1919
- Date: July 15, 1919
- Location: Port Arthur, Texas
- Injuries: Dozens wounded

The Port Arthur riot happened on July 15, 1919, in Port Arthur, Texas. Violence started after a group of white men objected to an African American smoking near a white woman on a street car. A "score" of whites and twice that number of African Americans battled in the streets leaving two seriously injured and dozens with minor injuries.

== Aftermath ==
This uprising was one of several incidents of civil unrest that began in the so-called American Red Summer, of 1919. Terrorist attacks on black communities and white oppression in over three dozen cities and counties. In most cases, white mobs attacked African American neighborhoods. In some cases, black community groups resisted the attacks, especially in Chicago and Washington DC. Most deaths occurred in rural areas during events like the Elaine massacre in Arkansas, where an estimated 100 to 240 black people and 5 white people were killed. Also in 1919 were the Chicago Race Riot and Washington D.C. race riot which killed 38 and 39 people respectively, and with both having many more non-fatal injuries and extensive property damage reaching up into the millions of dollars.

== See also ==
- Washington race riot of 1919
- Mass racial violence in the United States
- List of incidents of civil unrest in the United States

== Bibliography ==
Notes

References

- The Bossier Banner (July 17, 1919). "Crimes and casualties" (Four-page weekly newspaper). The Bossier Banner. Bellevue, Caldwell Parish, Louisiana: William Henry Scanland. pp. 1–4. ISSN 2381-5116. OCLC 12598239.
- The New York Times (October 5, 1919). "For Action on Race Riot Peril". The New York Times. ISSN 1553-8095. OCLC 1645522.
- The Pensacola Journal (July 15, 1919). "Whites clash with Negroes in Port Arthur" (Daily). The Pensacola Journal. Pensacola, Florida: William Marion Loftin. pp. 1–8. ISSN 1941-109X. OCLC 16280864.
