= Longfellow House (disambiguation) =

Longfellow House could refer to several places, some of which are related to American poet Henry Wadsworth Longfellow:

- Wadsworth-Longfellow House, in Portland, Maine, where the poet grew up
- Longfellow House–Washington's Headquarters National Historic Site (formerly Longfellow National Historic Site), in Cambridge, Massachusetts, where he spent most of his life
- Longfellow House, in Minneapolis, Minnesota, a replica of the Longfellow National Historic Site
- Longfellow House in Pascagoula, Mississippi, also known as Bellevue, listed on the National Register of Historic Places
