= Bellevue Park =

Bellevue Park may refer to any of the following:

== United Kingdom ==
- Bellevue Park, Wrexham, a park in Wrexham, Wales
- Bellevue Park Railway, a railway formerly in operation in Belfast

== United States ==
- Bellevue Park (Harrisburg), a neighborhood in Harrisburg, Pennsylvania
- Bellevue Hill Park, a park in Cincinnati, Ohio
- Bellevue Downtown Park, a park in Bellevue, Washington
- Bellevue Park (stadium), a stadium in Green Bay, Wisconsin, formerly used by the Green Bay Packers

== See also ==
- Bellevue State Park (disambiguation)
- Belle Vue Park (disambiguation)
