= Samuel Woodfill =

US Army officer and Medal of Honor recipient (1883–1951)

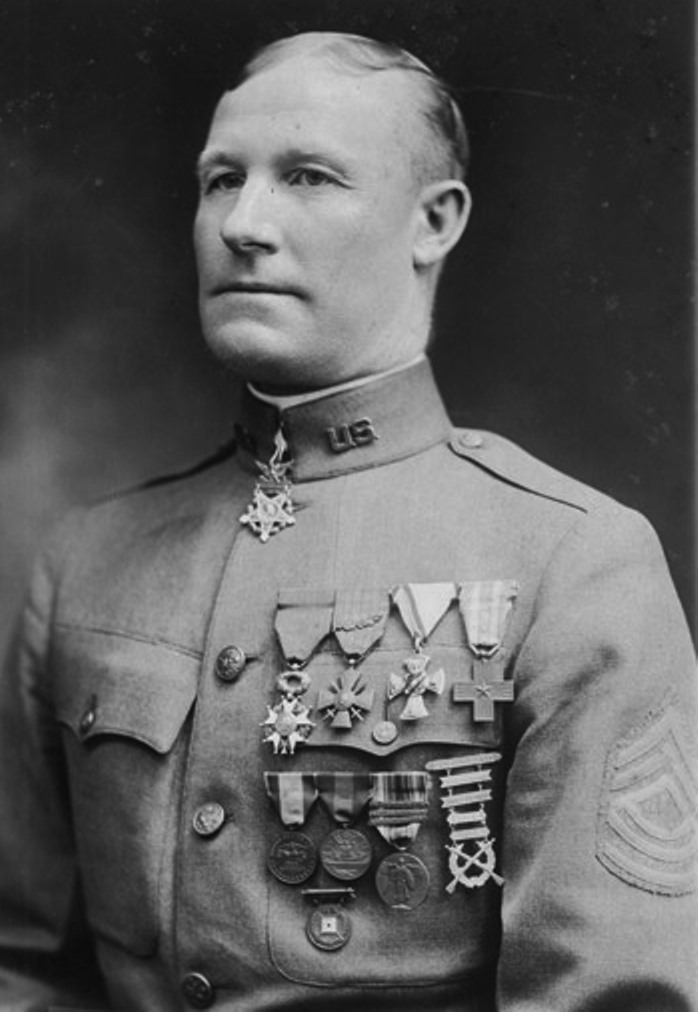
- Medal of Honor recipient
- Born: January 6, 1883 near Bryantsburg, Indiana, U.S.
- Died: August 10, 1951 (aged 68); Vevay, Indiana, U.S.
- Burial place: Arlington National Cemetery
- Military career
- Allegiance: United States of America
- Branch: United States Army
- Service years: 1901–1923; 1942–1944
- Rank: Major
- Units: 60th Infantry Regiment, Fifth Infantry Division
- Conflicts: World War I Meuse-Argonne Offensive; World War II
- Awards: Medal of Honor

Samuel Woodfill (January 6, 1883 – August 10, 1951) was a major in the United States Army. He was a veteran of the Philippine–American War, World War I, and World War II. Woodfill was one of the most celebrated American soldiers of the early 20th century. General John Pershing called Woodfill the most outstanding soldier in World War I. During an offensive in October 1918, he single-handedly neutralized three German machine gun emplacements while suffering under the effect of mustard gas, and was able to successfully lead his men safely back to the American lines without casualties. Woodfill was considered to be one of America's most decorated soldiers in World War I. He received the Medal of Honor (which General Pershing presented on 9 February 1919), the French Légion d'honneur in the degree of Chevalier, the French Croix de guerre with bronze palm, the Montenegrin Order of Prince Danilo I in the degree of Knight and the Italian Croce al Merito di Guerra among other awards. So legendary was Woodfill's renown, that almost 11 years after the war ended, a Polish Army delegation presented him two medals. The presentation occurred during the 11th Annual National Convention of the American Legion held in Louisville, Kentucky from 30 September - 3 October 1929.

After returning home at the end of the war, Woodfill took a number of different jobs before starting a career as an insurance salesman. He was among the three soldiers chosen to dedicate the Tomb of the Unknown Soldier in 1921, joining fellow Medal of Honor recipients Charles Whittlesey and Alvin York. At the outbreak of World War II, he was commissioned as a major and spent two years training recruits before resigning from the army after the death of his wife in 1943. Woodfill retired to a farm near Vevay, Indiana, where he lived until his death. He was buried at Arlington National Cemetery.

== Early life ==
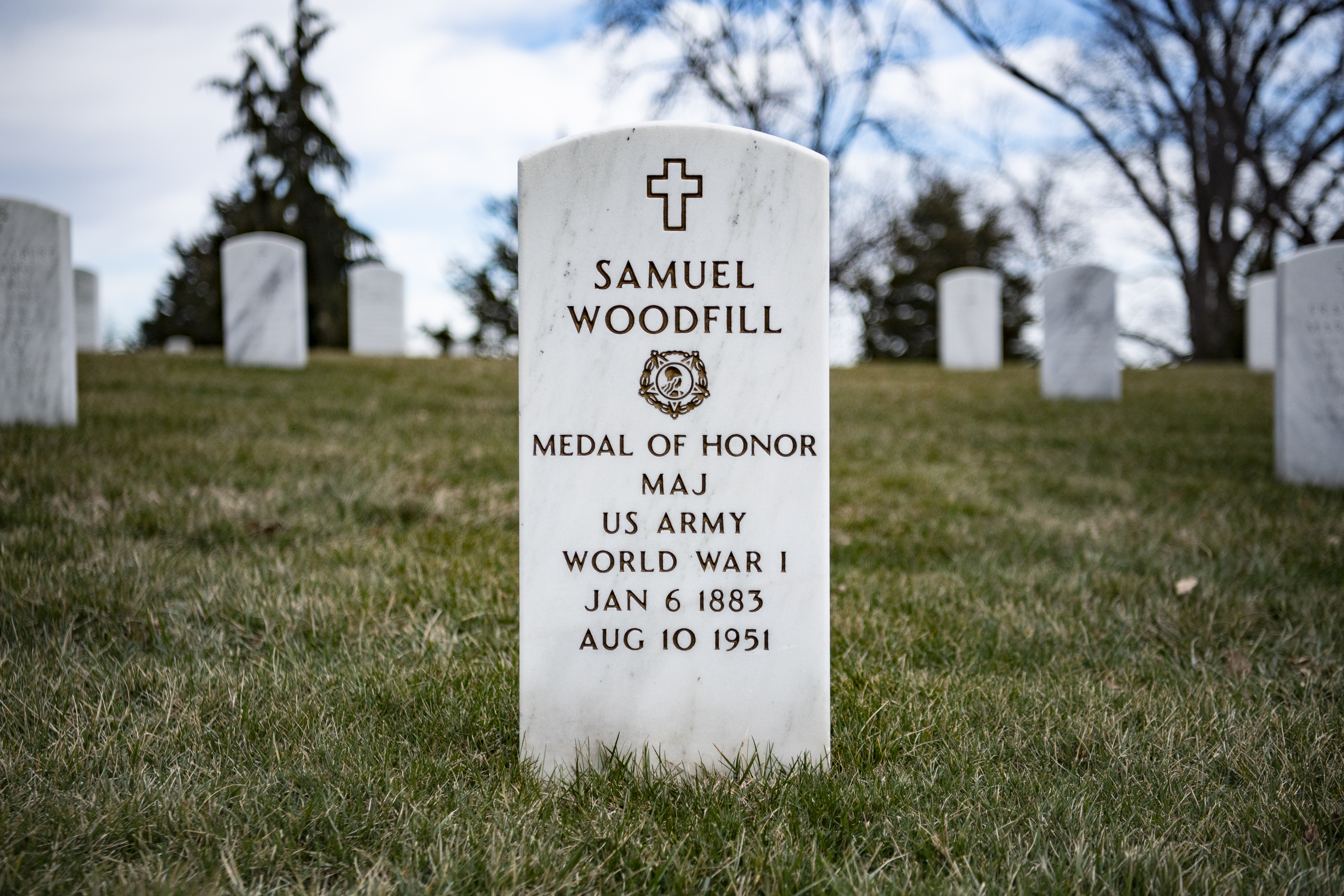
Grave at Arlington National Cemetery

Samuel Woodfill was born January 6, 1883, near Bryantsburg, Indiana to John Samuel Goode Woodfill (1824–1896) and Christina (née Heaverline) Woodfill (1855–1919). His father was a veteran of the Mexican–American War and the Civil War, having served in the 5th Regiment Indiana Infantry.

Samuel Woodfill learned to hunt at an early age and was a good shot by age ten. He received a basic education in local schools and enlisted in the 11th Infantry of the United States Army on March 8, 1901.

== Military career ==
The United States was occupying the Philippines when Woodfill was dispatched as a private. Woodfill was involved in a number of conflicts with Filipino guerilla forces. He remained in the Philippines until 1904 before being transferred to Alaska that same year to serve at Fort Egbert until its closure in 1911. Not wanting to leave Alaska, Woodfill remained and served at Fort Gibbon. In 1912, he was stationed in Fort Thomas, Kentucky.

In 1914 Woodfill was dispatched as part of a force to guard the Mexican American border during the Mexican Civil War. Their presence was sufficient to halt the cross border violence and he saw no action there. In 1917, his company returned to Fort Thomas.

After the United States declared war on Germany and entered World War I in April 1917, the Army greatly expanded. Due to the demand for experienced officers, Woodfill was granted a temporary commission as a second lieutenant on July 11, 1917.

About this time, Woodfill began courting Lorena "Blossom" Wiltshire and the couple married on December 26, 1917. The couple bought a home in the town of Fort Thomas.

== World War I ==
After the American entry into World War I, Woodfill's regiment, the 60th Infantry was in late 1917 assigned to the Fifth Infantry Division and deployed to Europe in early 1918 to reinforce the American Expeditionary Forces (AEF) under the command of General John J. Pershing. Due to a shortage of experienced officers in the army, Woodfill was promoted to second lieutenant on July 11, 1917, and to first lieutenant on March 2, 1918. His regiment was placed in the defenses between Meuse and the Argonne in France in August 1918.

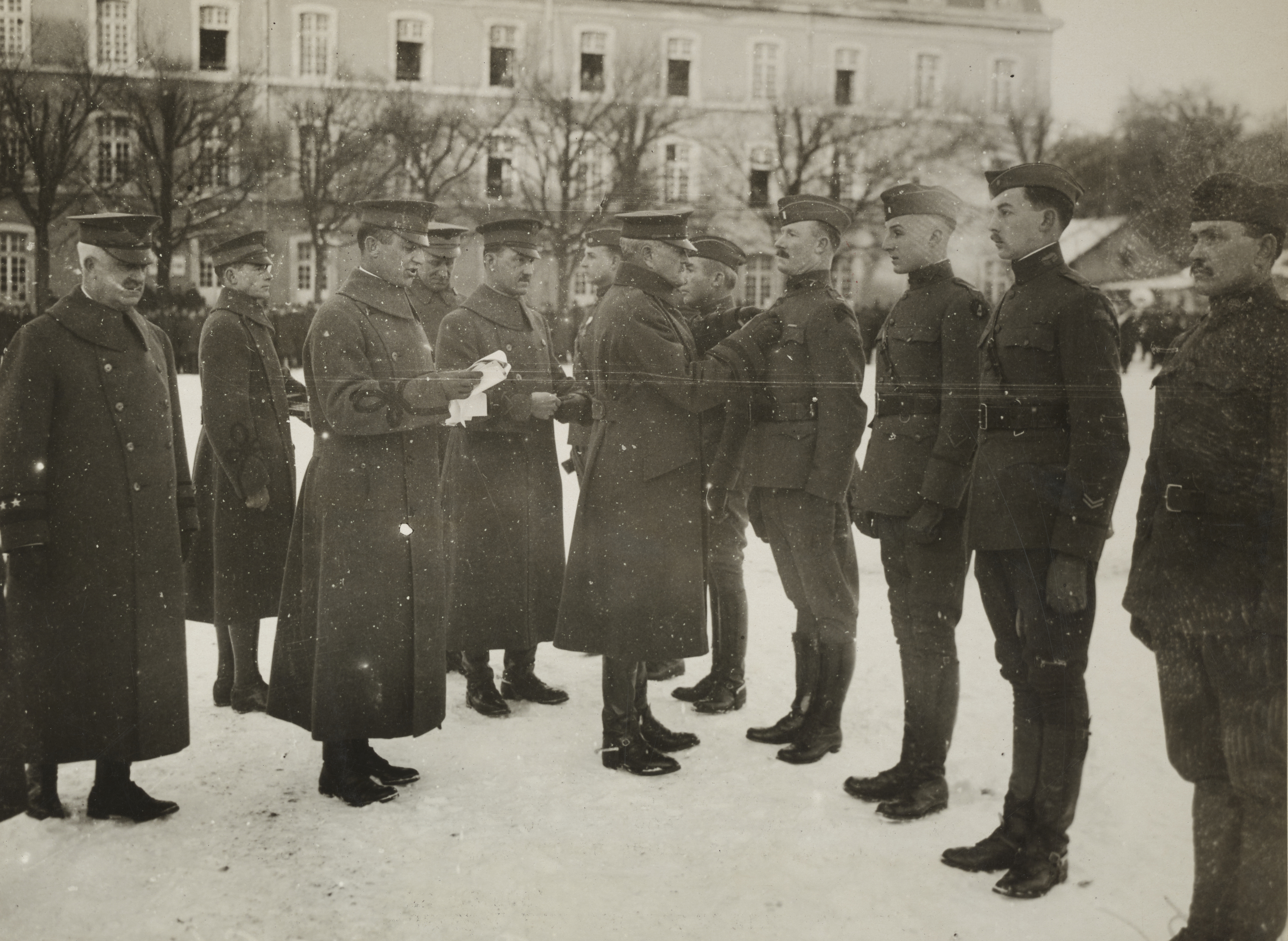
General John J. Pershing presenting the Medal of Honor to First Lieutenant Samuel Woodfill of Company M, 60th Infantry, 5th Division, outside Pershing's headquarters at Chaumont, France, February 1919.

On September 26 the Meuse–Argonne offensive began. The offensive lasted for forty-seven days and left tens of thousands dead, with many more wounded. On the morning of October 12, Woodfill and his company were stationed near Cunel when his men were advancing through thick fog. As they moved forward, machine gun fire broke out from German held positions targeting Woodfill and his men. While the other men took cover, Woodfill quickly advanced on the machine gun emplacement while avoiding being hit. As he approached the emplacement he opened fire, disabling three German soldiers. A German officer rushed Woodfill and engaged him in hand-to-hand combat, but Woodfill gained the advantage and killed him.

With the threat removed, Woodfill signaled for his company to advance when a second machine gun opened fire. Woodfill ordered his men to charge the emplacement, which was quickly overrun and three Germans captured. His men again resumed their advance only to have a third machine gun open fire. Woodfill ordered another charge. As he approached the machine gun he opened fire with his rifle, disabling five German soldiers. Woodfill was first to reach the gun emplacement and entered the bunker pit. He discharged all the shots in his pistol without hitting either of the two soldiers manning the position. He then seized a nearby pick axe and clubbed the two soldiers to death.

Mustard gas had become heavy in the area during the fighting and Woodfill and his men began to suffer under its effect. As the symptoms worsened, Woodfill ordered his men to withdraw to the allied battle line. None of his men died in the fierce fighting, but several, including Woodfill, were hospitalized in Bordeaux after their retreat. Woodfill saw no more action for the remainder of the war and remained in medical care for several weeks while he received treatment for the effects of the poisonous gas. His heroics earned him a number of decorations, but he would suffer from weakened lungs for the rest of his life.

== Post war ==
Woodfill was promoted to captain in the Infantry on March 25, 1919. Unfortunately for Woodfill, the Army was in the process of a major drawdown after the First World War and Woodfill was discharged on October 31, 1919. He re-enlisted as a sergeant on November 24 and was later promoted to master sergeant.

Along with Alvin York and others, Woodfill was picked in 1921 to serve as a pallbearer for the Unknown Soldier. He was regarded as one of the country's great heroes of World War I, but apparently struggled to make a living after the war.

Despite his honors, Woodfill—on a sergeant's salary—struggled to pay his bills and to pay off the mortgage on his Fort Thomas home. Woodfill took a job in 1922 as a $6-a-day carpenter working on the Ohio River dam project at Silver Grove. Ned Hastings, manager of the Keith Theater in Cincinnati, sent pictures of Woodfill working at the dam site to New York City. There, a theatrical group involved in charitable work raised money to pay off the mortgage on Woodfill's Fort Thomas home and to pay up an insurance policy.

Woodfill retired from the Army as a master sergeant on December 24, 1923. He was promoted to the rank of captain on the retired list by an act of Congress on May 7, 1932.

== Later life ==
In 1924, an effort was made by some independent Democrats to encourage Woodfill to run for the United States Congress and challenge Democratic incumbent Arthur B. Rouse. A Kentucky Post account on April 16, 1924, said Woodfill had expressed an interest in Congress while attending a reception in Washington, D.C., three years before during the dedication of the Tomb of the Unknown Soldier. When Woodfill was proposed as a candidate for Congress, he was out of town doing promotional work for American Legion posts in Massachusetts. Mrs. Woodfill, contacted at her home in Fort Thomas, downplayed the idea. She said when her husband was first contacted to participate in the dedication event, he had expressed reluctance, saying, "I'm tired of being a circus pony. Every time there is something doing they trot me out to perform."

Mrs. Woodfill said her husband disliked public events because he was basically a bashful person who did not enjoy the glare of public attention. She added, though, "My husband may not have the education of a lawyer, scholar or the like, but if reputation, honesty, service and truth were the only requisite, he is amply qualified to fill the high position to which his friends would elect him." Upon his return to northern Kentucky, Woodfill quickly put an end to candidate speculation, saying he wanted no part of elected office.

Locally, Woodfill remained a celebrity. In October 1924, a life-size painting of Woodfill was presented to Woodfill Elementary School by Mrs. Woodfill. The painting was to hang in the school along with copies of his citations and a brief history of his life. And in October 1928, Woodfill and his wife were the special guests of honor at the Greater Cincinnati Industrial Exposition. That account said Woodfill was living in retirement on a farm in Campbell County. A later account said Woodfill had purchased about 60 acres (240,000 m^{2}) of farm land between Silver Grove and Flagg Springs in rural Campbell County in 1925, with the vision of planting apple and peach trees. A report on July 24, 1929, said many of the trees died, so Woodfill purchased more trees. The account said he worked hard trying to make the orchard into a paying business, but the orchard never became a success.

By 1929, Woodfill found himself with a $2,000 debt. To keep from losing the farm, the 46-year-old Woodfill took a job as a watchman at the Newport Rolling Mill on July 15, 1929—working daily 2–11 p.m. Woodfill was still working as a guard at the Andrews Steel plant in Newport and living at his home in Fort Thomas when the U.S. entered World War II, after the bombing of Pearl Harbor.

His autobiography, Woodfill of the Regulars, which was ghostwritten by Lowell Thomas, was published in 1929.

In May 1942, Woodfill and Alvin C. York—himself a highly decorated World War I veteran from Tennessee—were commissioned Army majors. Woodfill told a Kentucky Times-Star reporter at the time he was not aware the Army was going to give him the commission, which he termed a pleasant surprise. Woodfill was 59 and the Army commissions were part of a national campaign to boost national spirit and enlistments. Woodfill was later featured in an Army publicity picture, which showed him firing a rifle at Fort Benning, Georgia. Woodfill apparently spent most of the war as an instructor in Birmingham, Alabama.

His wife Lorena died March 26, 1942, at Christ Hospital in Cincinnati. One account said she was buried in Falmouth. In 1944, Woodfill again resigned from the Army, and he retired to a farm near Vevay in Switzerland County, Indiana. Because his wife was dead, Woodfill decided not to return to Fort Thomas.

In a 1978 Kentucky Post story, Agatha Sackstedder, who grew up in a house across the street from the Woodfills, described Mrs. Woodfill as tall and elegant. She added that cookies and a big bowl of fresh fruit were always on the family table. She said the Woodfills had no children and Mrs. Woodfill seemed to enjoy having a young girl visit her. Mrs. Sackstedder described Woodfill as a strong looking, very tall man with a ruddy, happy looking face.

== Death and burial ==
Woodfill was found dead at the Indiana farm on August 13, 1951, at the age of 68. He apparently had died of natural causes several days before he was found. Neighbors said they had not missed him because he had talked of going to Cincinnati to buy plumbing supplies. Despite his Indiana roots, a Kentucky Post editorial on August 15, 1951, called Woodfill "one of the greatest soldiers produced by the Bluegrass state."

Woodfill was initially buried in the Jefferson County Cemetery near Madison, Indiana. But through the efforts of Indiana Congressman Earl Wilson, Woodfill's body was removed and buried at Arlington National Cemetery in October 1955. His grave can be found in Section 34, Grave 642.

== Medal of Honor citation ==
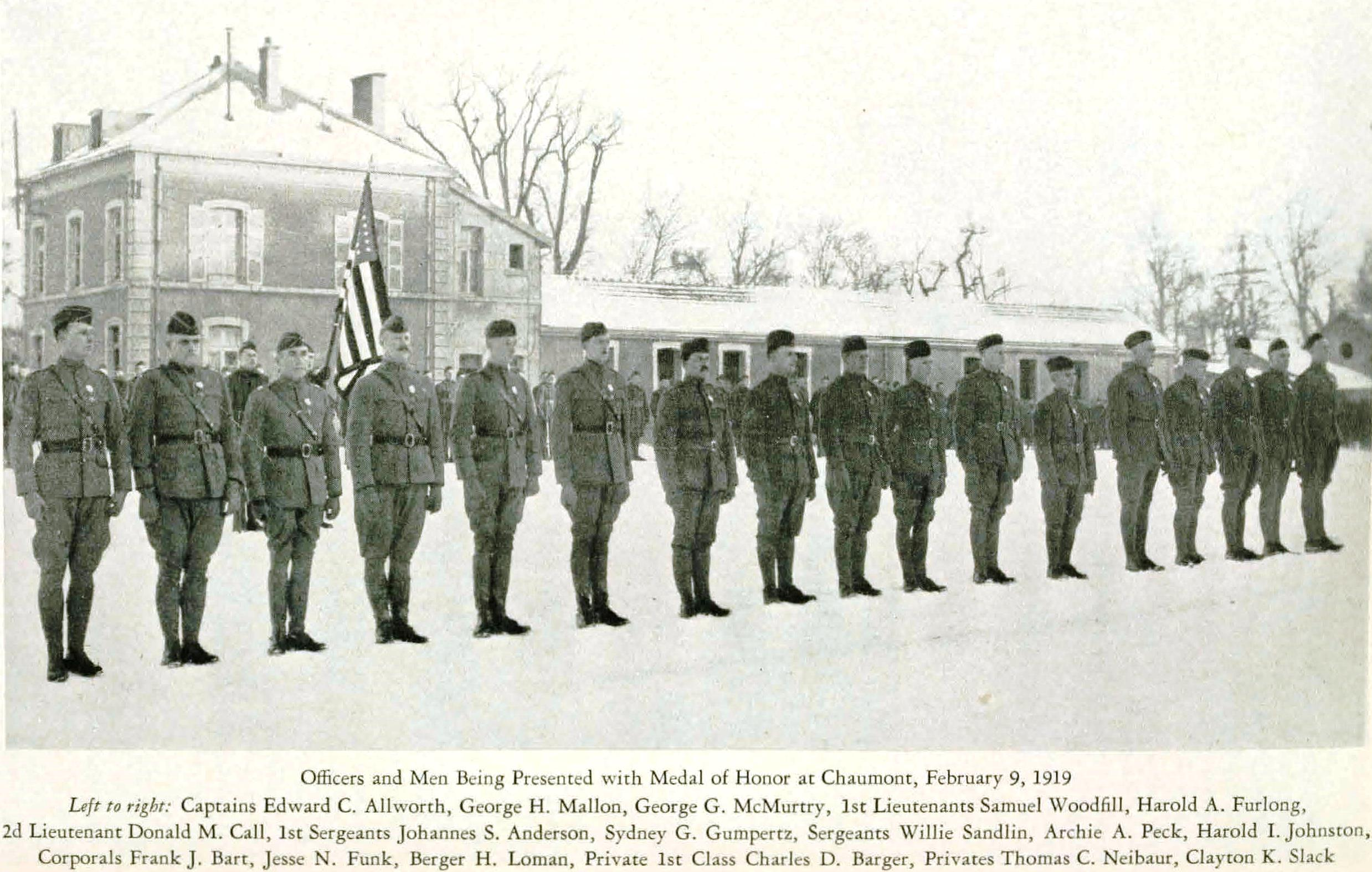
Medal of Honor Presentation Ceremony – February 9, 1919, at Chaumont, France. General John J. Pershing presided.

Rank and organization: First Lieutenant, U.S. Army, Company M, 60th Infantry, 5th Division. Place and date: At Cunel, France; 12 October 1918. Entered service at: Bryantsburg Indiana. Birth: January 6, 1883; Jefferson County, Indiana. General Orders: War Department, General Orders No. 16 (January 22, 1919).

Citation:

While he was leading his company against the enemy, First Lieutenant Woodfill's line came under heavy machinegun fire, which threatened to hold up the advance. Followed by two soldiers at 25 yards, this officer went out ahead of his first line toward a machinegun nest and worked his way around its flank, leaving the two soldiers in front. When he got within ten yards of the gun it ceased firing, and four of the enemy appeared, three of whom were shot by First Lieutenant Woodfill. The fourth, an officer, rushed at First Lieutenant Woodfill, who attempted to club the officer with his rifle. After a hand-to-hand struggle, First Lieutenant Woodfill killed the officer with his pistol. His company thereupon continued to advance, until shortly afterwards another machinegun nest was encountered. Calling on his men to follow, First Lieutenant Woodfill rushed ahead of his line in the face of heavy fire from the nest, and when several of the enemy appeared above the nest he shot them, capturing three other members of the crew and silencing the gun. A few minutes later this officer for the third time demonstrated conspicuous daring by charging another machinegun position, killing five men in one machinegun pit with his rifle. He then drew his revolver and started to jump into the pit, when two other gunners only a few yards away turned their gun on him. Failing to kill them with his revolver, he grabbed a pick lying nearby and killed both of them. Inspired by the exceptional courage displayed by this officer, his men pressed on to their objective under severe shell and machinegun fire.

== Military awards ==
Woodfill's military decorations and awards include:

1st row	Medal of Honor		Philippine Campaign Medal
2nd row	Mexican Border Service Medal	World War I Victory Medal w/three bronze service stars (to denote credit for the St. Mihiel, Meuse-Argonne and Defensive Sector battle clasps)	American Campaign Medal
3rd row	World War II Victory Medal	Ordre national de la Légion d'honneur degree of Chevalier (French Republic)	Croix de guerre 1914–1918 w/bronze palm (French Republic)
4th row	Order of Leopold degree of Knight (Kingdom of Belgium)	Croce al Merito di Guerra (Kingdom of Italy)	Order of Prince Danilo I degree of Knight (Kingdom of Montenegro)

Note: Major Woodfill's injuries suffered in gas attacks made him eligible to receive the Purple Heart, but there is no evidence he ever received the decoration. This is possibly because he was retired from the Army when the Purple Heart was established in 1932.

=== Other honors ===
An elementary school in Ft. Thomas, Kentucky, is named for him. The Fort Polk post headquarters building is named after him. In 2009, the Indiana War Memorial renamed a meeting room in honor of him.

== See also ==
- List of Medal of Honor recipients for World War I
- List of members of the American Legion

== Sources ==
- Funk, Arville L (1983) [1969]. A Sketchbook of Indiana History. Rochester, Indiana: Christian Book Press.
- Kirchner, Paul (2009). More of the Deadliest Men Who Ever Lived. Paladin Press. ISBN 978-1-58160-690-4.
- Newell, Ben (2008). Major Sam Woodfill: The Greatest Soldier of WWI. America Star Books. ISBN 978-1605637105.
- Thomas, Lowell (1929). Woodfill of the Regulars. Troubador Publishing??.
- "Samuel Woodfill". Hall of Valor. Military Times.
- Willbanks, James H. (2011). America's Heroes: Medal of Honor Recipients from the Civil War to Afghanistan. Santa Barbara, California: ABC-Clio. ISBN 978-1-5988-4394-1.
