= Belle Vue =

Belle Vue means "beautiful view" in French. It may refer to:

== Place names ==
- Bells Vue, Allerdale, a location in Cumbria, England
- Belle Vue, Cumbria, a district of Carlisle, England
- Belle Vue, County Durham, a locality in the TS postcode area of Hartlepool, England
- Belle Vue Harel, a village in Rivière du Rempart District, Mauritius
- Belle Vue, Manchester, an area of Manchester, Greater Manchester, England
- Belle Vue, Shrewsbury, a suburb of Shrewsbury, Shropshire, England
- Belle Vue, South Yorkshire, a locality within Doncaster, England
- Belle Vue, Torbeck, Haiti, a village in the Torbeck commune of Haiti
- Belle Vue, Bradford, a district of Bradford, England
- Belle Vue, Wakefield, West Yorkshire, England

== Sporting ==
- Belle Vue (Doncaster), an association football ground in Doncaster, England, former home of Doncaster Rovers
- Belle Vue Stadium a greyhound racing and speedway stadium in Manchester, England
- Belle Vue speedway, a speedway stadium in Manchester, England
  - Belle Vue Aces, a motorcycle speedway team based in Manchester
  - Belle Vue Colts, a junior motorcycle speedway team linked to the Belle Vue Aces
- Belle Vue (Rhyl), an association football stadium in Rhyl, Wales, used by Rhyl F.C.
- Belle Vue (Wakefield), a rugby league stadium in Wakefield, England, home of Wakefield Trinity

== Islands ==
- Belle Vue Island, New Zealand
- Belle Vue Islands, Australia

== Other ==
- Belle Vue (Bellevue, Tennessee), a mansion on the US National Register of Historic Places
- Belle Vue Airfield, an airfield in north Devon, England
- Belle-Vue Brewery, a lambic brewery in Belgium
- Belle Vue Girls' Academy, a secondary school in Bradford, West Yorkshire, England
- Belle Vue House, an historical house located at 92 Cheyne Walk, Chelsea, London
- Belle Vue (palace), a palace designed by Zygmunt Gorgolewski
- Belle Vue railway station, a railway station serving Belle Vue, Manchester, England
- Belle Vue railway station, Isle of Man a railway station serving Port Lewaigue and Port-e-Vullen on the Isle of Man
- Belle Vue Zoological Gardens, a former zoo, gardens and amusement park in Manchester, England
- Belle Vue, Alco-pop Band, West Yorkshire
- Belle Vue (Amherstburg), a historic house in Essex County, Canada

== See also ==
- Belleview (disambiguation)
- Bellevue (disambiguation)
