= Charles W. Whittlesey =

United States Army Medal of Honor recipient

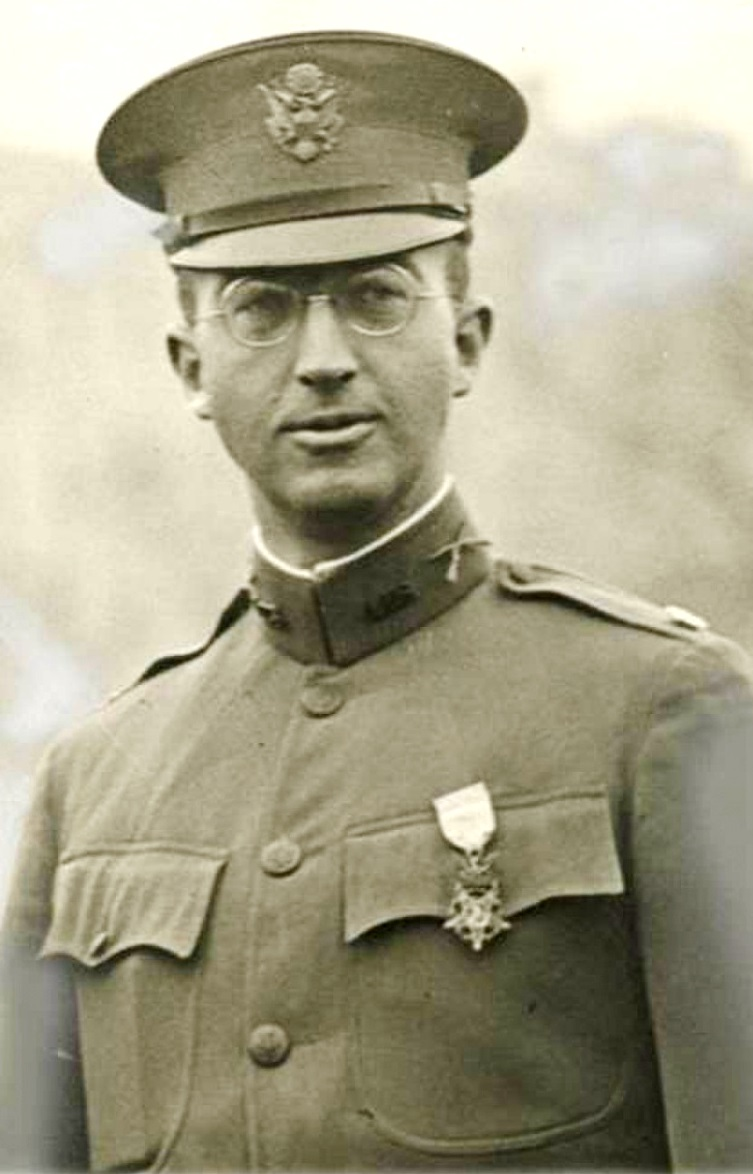
- Whittlesey in uniform, 1918
- Born: Charles White Whittlesey; January 20, 1884; Florence, Wisconsin, U.S.
- Died: November 26, 1921 (aged 37); Atlantic Ocean, en route to Havana, Cuba, from New York, New York, U.S.
- Monuments: Whittlesey Memorial Marker, Pittsfield Cemetery, Pittsfield, Massachusetts, U.S.
- Education: Williams College; Harvard University
- Occupations: Lawyer, military officer
- Military service
- Service: United States Army
- Service years: 1917–1919
- Rank: Lieutenant Colonel
- Commands: "Lost Battalion," 308th Infantry, 77th Division
- Battles: World War I; Oise-Aisne; Meuse-Argonne; Defensive Sector
- Awards: Medal of Honor; See more

Charles White Whittlesey (January 20, 1884 – November 26, 1921) was a United States Army Medal of Honor recipient who led the Lost Battalion in the Meuse–Argonne offensive during World War I. He committed suicide by drowning when he jumped from a ship en route to Havana on November 26, 1921, at age 37.

== Early life ==
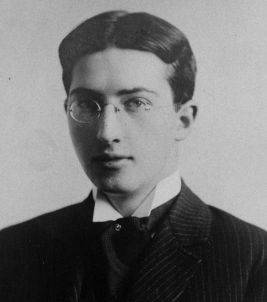
Whittlesey at Williams College

Charles White Whittlesey was born in Florence, Wisconsin, where his father worked as a logger, and he attended school in Green Bay, Wisconsin. He moved with his family in 1894 to Pittsfield, Massachusetts, where he graduated from Pittsfield High School in the class of 1901. He enrolled at Williams College, where he was a member of St. Anthony Hall, graduating in 1905. He was voted the "third-brightest man" in his class, and because of his aristocratic manner was nicknamed "Count." He earned a law degree from Harvard Law School in 1908. Soon after graduating, he formed a law partnership with his Williams classmate J. Bayard Pruyn in New York City. Influenced by his friend and roommate at Williams, Max Eastman, Whittlesey spent several years as a member of the American Socialist Party before resigning his membership in disgust over what he viewed as the movement's increasing extremism.

== World War I ==
In May 1917, a month after the American entry into World War I, Whittlesey took a leave from his partnership and joined the United States Army. He shipped for the Western Front as a captain in the 308th Infantry, 77th Division. The 77th Division was known as the "Metropolitan Division" because it was made up largely of New York City men principally from the polyglot Lower East side. Its members spoke 42 different languages or dialects.

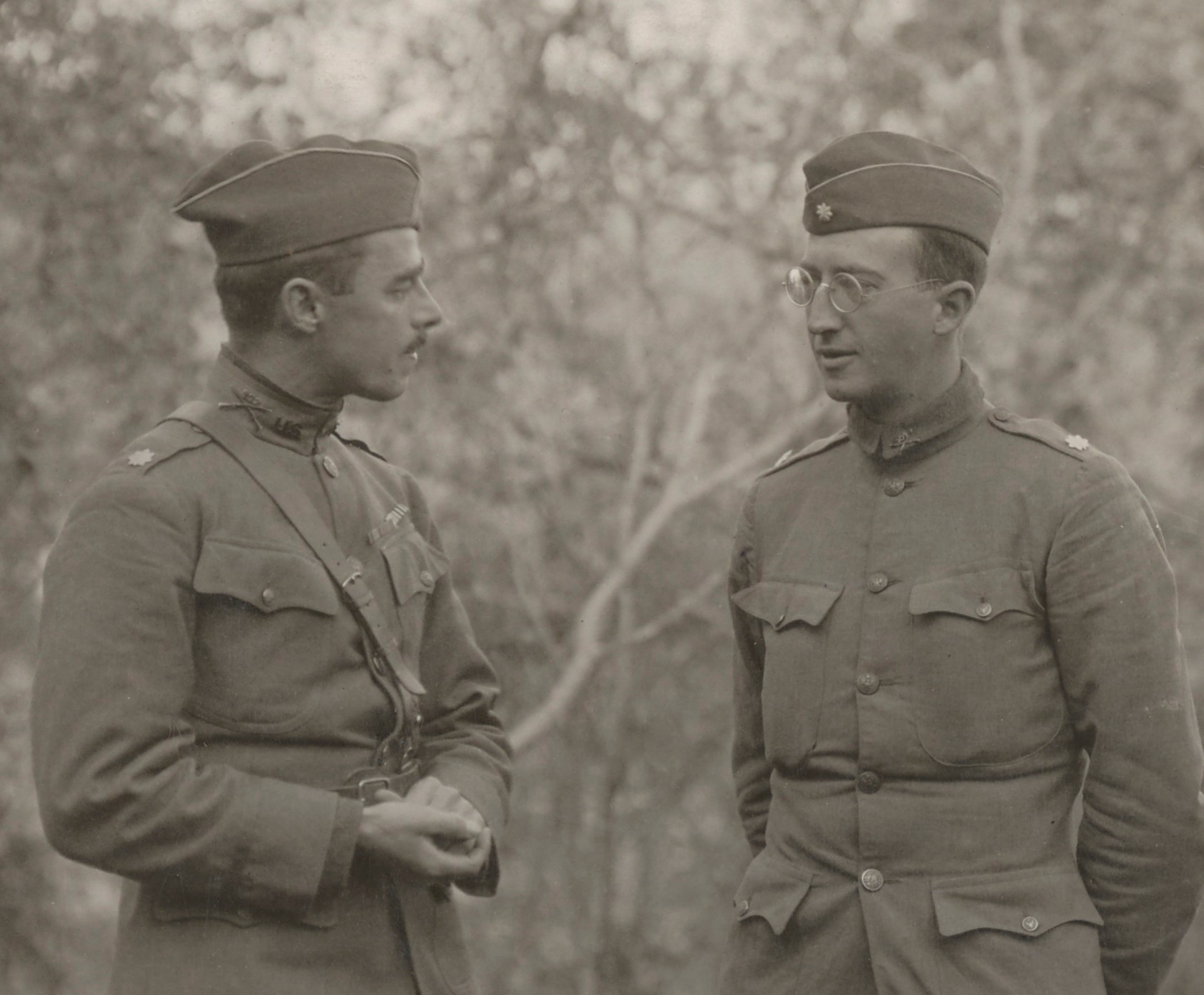
Maj. Whittlesey (right) talking to Maj. Kenny, commanding the 3rd Battalion, 307th Infantry after the battle. Kenny's battalion took part in "Lost Battalion" relief attempts.

By September 1917 Whittlesey was promoted to major and placed in command of a battalion. On the morning of October 2, 1918, the 77th Division was ordered to move forward against a heavily fortified German line as part of a massive American attack in the Meuse-Argonne region. Whittlesey commanded a mixed battalion of 554 soldiers, who advanced forward through a ravine. Because the units on their flanks failed to make headway, Whittlesey's troops were cut off from their supply lines, pinned down by German fire from the surrounding 200-foot (61 m) high bluffs. The following days were perilous for Whittlesey and his men, as they were without food or water. Some of the men had never thrown a live grenade, but for four days, they resisted snipers and attacks by waves of German troops armed with hand grenades, and in one incident, flame throwers. During this period war correspondents seized on the incident and dubbed the unit the "Lost Battalion".

On October 7, the Germans sent forward a blindfolded American POW carrying a white flag, with a message in English:

The suffering of your wounded men can be heard over here in the German lines, and we are appealing to your humane sentiments to stop. A white flag shown by one of your men will tell us that you agree with these conditions. Please treat Private Lowell R. Hollingshead [the bearer] as an honorable man. He is quite a soldier. We envy you. The German commanding officer.

Whittlesey's alleged reply was "You go to hell!" although he later denied saying it, stating a response was unnecessary. He ordered white sheets that had been placed as signals for Allied aircraft to drop supplies to be pulled in so they would not be mistaken for surrender signals. That night, a relief force arrived and the Germans retreated. Of the original 554 troops involved in the advance, 107 had been killed, 63 were missing and 190 were wounded. Only 194 were able to walk out of the ravine.

== Awards and decorations ==
Whittlesey's awards and decorations included the following:

U.S. military decorations
Medal of Honor
U.S. service medals
World War I Victory Medal (with three bronze campaign stars)
Foreign military decorations
Officer of the Legion of Honor (France)
1914-1918 War Cross with Palm (France)
War Cross (Italy)
Knight Commander of the Order of Prince Danilo I (Montenegro)

=== Medal of Honor citation ===

For conspicuous gallantry and intrepidity at the risk of his life above and beyond the call of duty:

Although cut off for five days from the remainder of his division, Major Whittlesey maintained his position, which he had reached under orders received for an advance, and held his command, consisting originally of 46 officers and men of the 308th Infantry and of Company K of the 307th Infantry, together in the face of superior numbers of the enemy during the five days. Major Whittlesey and his command were thus cut off, and no rations or other supplies reached him, in spite of determined efforts which were made by his division. On the 4th day Major Whittlesey received from the enemy a written proposition to surrender, which he treated with contempt, although he was at the time out of rations and had suffered a loss of about 50 percent in killed and wounded of his command and was surrounded by the enemy.

== Later life ==
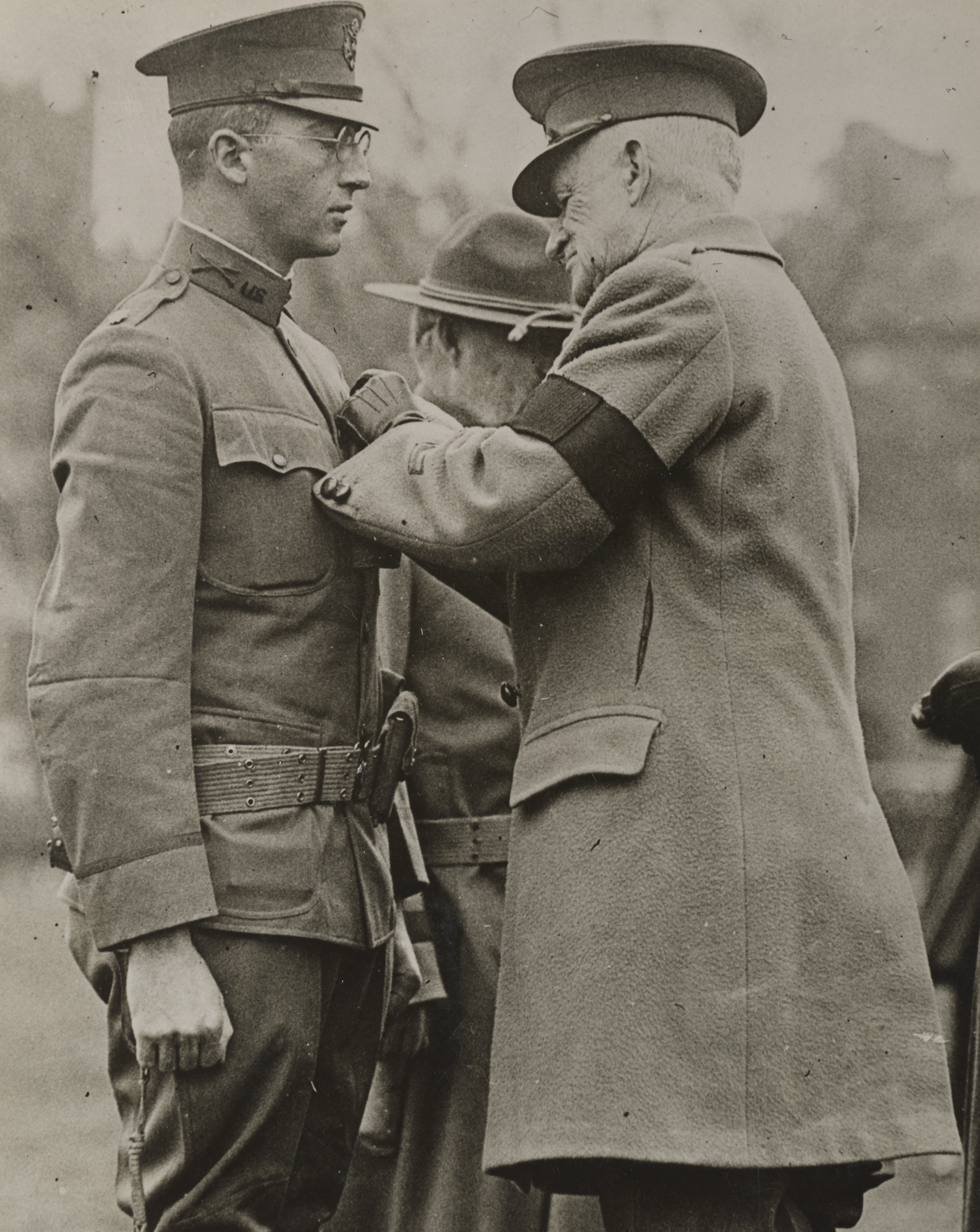
Major General Clarence R. Edwards pinning the Medal of Honor on Lieutenant Colonel Charles W. Whittlesey on Boston Common (December 24, 1918)

Whittlesey received a battlefield promotion to lieutenant colonel and returned to the United States as a war hero, receiving on December 6, 1918, one of the first three Medals of Honor awarded for valor in the war. (One of the other two went to his second-in-command, George G. McMurtry.) The story of the Lost Battalion was one of the most talked about events of World War I. In 1919, the events were made into a film in which Whittlesey was featured. He tried to return to his career, working as a lawyer at the Wall Street firm of White & Case, but found himself in constant demand for speeches, parades, and honorary degrees. The pressure wore on him; he said to a friend: "Not a day goes by but I hear from some of my old outfit, usually about some sorrow or misfortune. I cannot bear it much more."

Whittlesey never married or had children.

== Death ==
In November 1921, Whittlesey acted as a pallbearer at the burial of the Unknown Soldier at Arlington National Cemetery, along with fellow Medal of Honor recipients Samuel Woodfill and Alvin York. A few days later he booked passage from New York to Havana aboard the SS Toloa, a United Fruit Company ship. On November 26, 1921, his first night out of New York, he dined with the captain and left the smoking room at 11:15 p.m. stating he was retiring for the evening and it was noted by the captain that he was in good spirits. Whittlesey was never seen again and committed suicide by jumping overboard; his body was never recovered. Before leaving New York, he prepared a will leaving his property to his mother. He also left a series of letters in his cabin addressed to relatives and friends. The letters were addressed to his parents, his brothers Elisha and Melzar, his uncle Granville Whittlesey, and to his friends George McMurtry, J. Bayard Pruyn, Robert Forsyth Little and Herman Livingston Jr. Also in his cabin was found a note to the captain of the Toloa leaving instructions for the disposition of the baggage left in his stateroom. In a one-page will found at his law office, Whittlesey left McMurtry the German letter demanding the surrender of the Lost Battalion. Whittlesey's suicide was front-page news although those close to him were not surprised. In his eulogy at Whittlesey's funeral, Colonel Nathan K. Averill, the 308th's commander, said Whittlesey's death "was in reality a battle casualty and that he met his end as much in the line of duty as if he had fallen by a German bullet."

== Monuments and memorials ==
Whittlesey's cenotaph is in a cemetery in Pittsfield, Massachusetts. It notes that his body was never recovered. In 1948, the Charles White Whittlesey Room was dedicated at New York City's Williams Club. The US Army Reserve Center in Pittsfield is named in honor of Whittlesey.

== In popular culture ==
In 2001, U.S. television channel A&E made a television movie called The Lost Battalion based on accounts of the battle. In that portrayal Whittlesey was played by Rick Schroder.

In 2016 the Swedish band Sabaton released the songs "Diary of an Unknown Soldier and "The Lost Battalion" on their album The Last Stand, detailing the story of the Lost Battalion. In 2021 a special History Channel Edition was released featuring extra narration by Indy Neidell on the Lost Battalion and Charles Whittlesey.

In 2020, the novel Cher Ami and Major Whittlesey by Kathleen Rooney was released.

== See also ==
- List of Medal of Honor recipients for World War I
- List of members of the American Legion
- List of people from Wisconsin
- List of suicides (N–Z)
- List of drowning victims
