= Bellevue (Kingston, Ohio) =

Historic house in Ohio, United States

- U.S. National Register of Historic Places
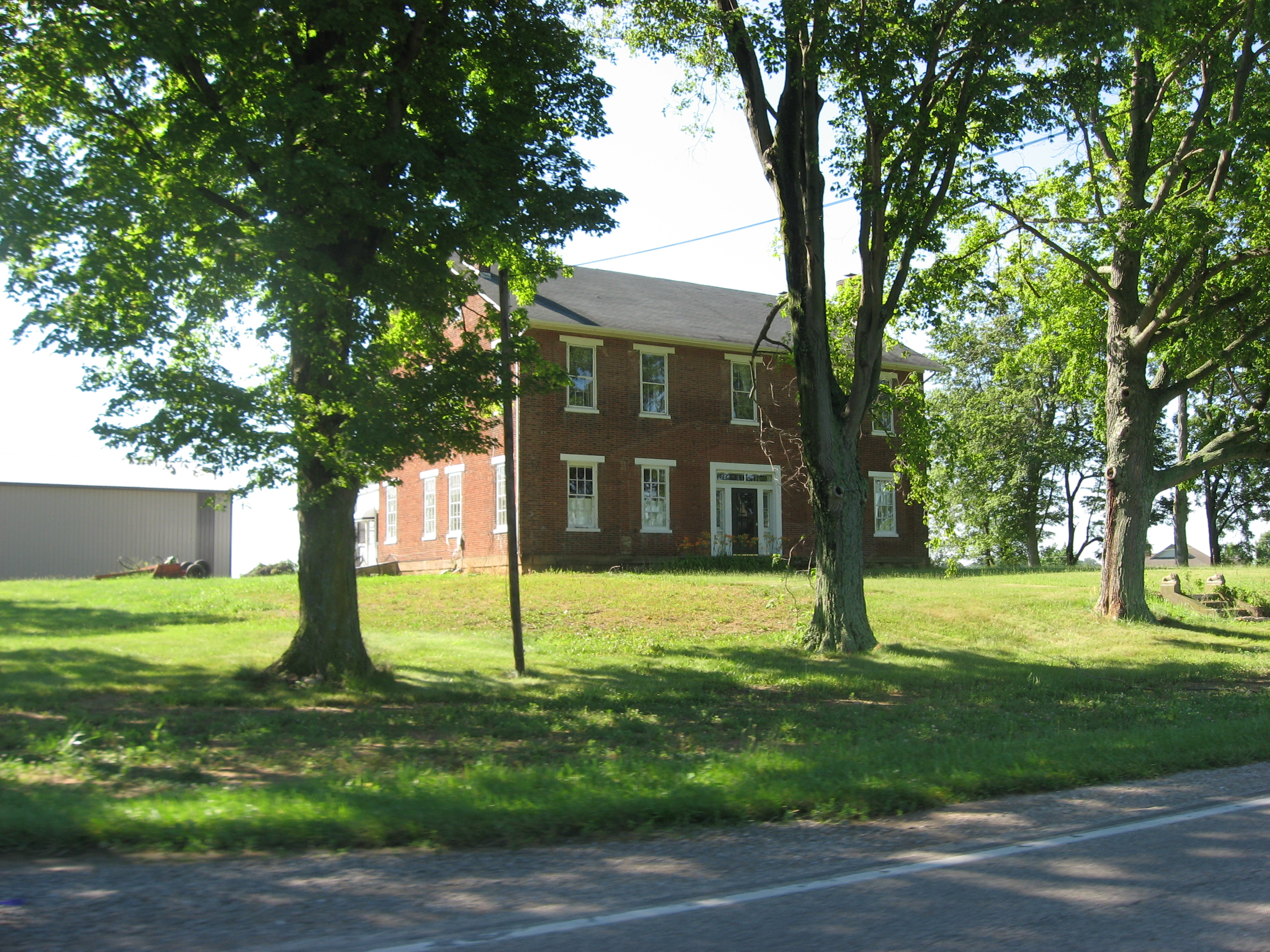
- Roadside view of the house

- Location within Ohio Location within the United States
- Nearest city: Kingston, Ohio
- Coordinates: 39°29′1″N 82°54′7″W
- Area: 1 acre (0.40 ha)
- Built: 1835
- Architect: Col. William Entrekin
- Architectural style: Federal
- NRHP reference No.: 76001508
- Added to NRHP: March 17, 1976

Bellevue is a historic farmhouse located near the village of Kingston in southern Pickaway County, Ohio, United States. Built of brick on a stone foundation, it was the home of leading early Ohio politician Renick Dunlap.

Built from 1835 to 1840, Bellevue was constructed for Colonel William Entrekin, whose family owned the property until its sale to Nelson Dunlap in 1899. Nelson's son Renick held several political offices, including Ohio Secretary of Agriculture, State Senator, and United States Assistant Secretary of Agriculture. His house is a rectangular two-and-a-half story structure, located along State Route 159. The Federal style of its original construction endures little changed to the present day, making the house one of the region's best nineteenth-century farmsteads. In 1976, Bellevue was listed on the National Register of Historic Places, both because of its well-preserved architecture and because of its connection to Renick Dunlap.
