= Batesville, Virginia =

Unincorporated community in Virginia, United States

Batesville
- Unincorporated community
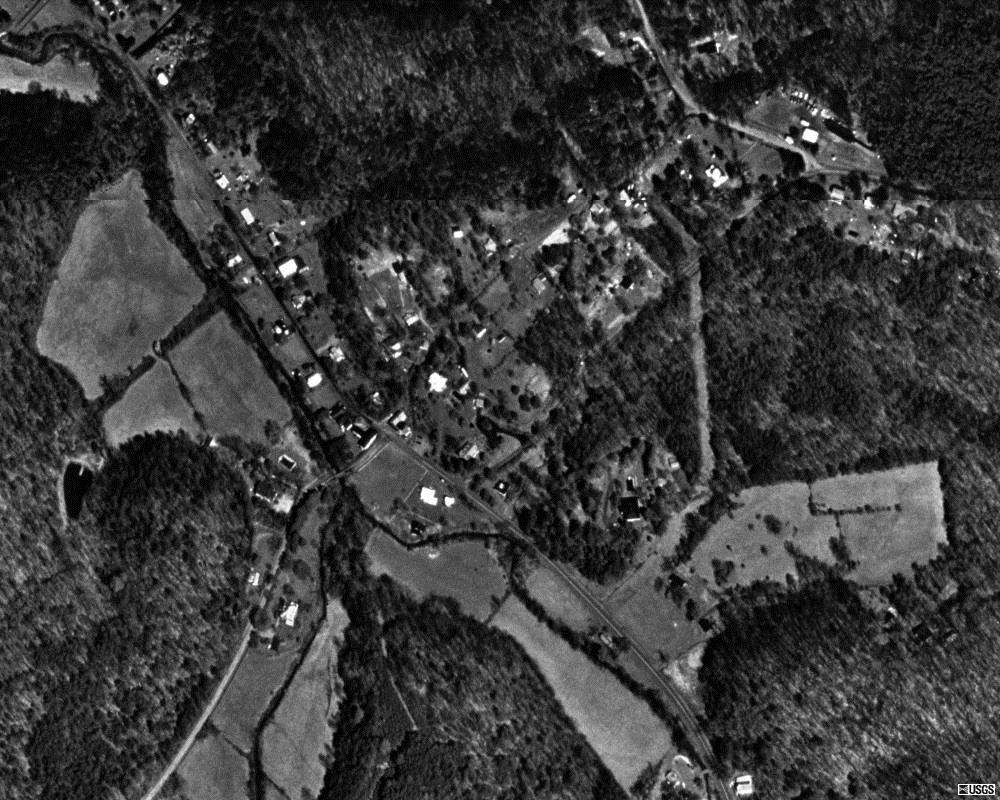
- Aerial Photograph of Batesville (1994)

- Location within the state of Virginia Batesville (the United States)
- Coordinates: 37°59′45″N 78°43′20″W
- Country: United States
- State: Virginia
- County: Albemarle
- Elevation: 620 ft (190 m)

Population (2000)
  - Total: 59
- Time zone: UTC−5 (Eastern (EST))
  - Summer (DST): UTC−4 (EDT)
- ZIP codes: 22924
- Area code: 540
- GNIS feature ID: 1492521

Batesville (also Mount Israel or Oliver's Store) is an unincorporated community in Albemarle County, Virginia, United States. Its elevation is 620 feet (190 m).

== History ==
Batesville was founded as Oliver's Store sometime around 1760 at the crossroads of two existing roads. By 1829, the name of the settlement was changed to Mount Israel, as indicated by United States Post Office records. The settlement's current name, Batesville, came into use by 1835, in reference to the Bates family. Batesville's position at the intersection of two roads helped to develop the community as a way-station and repair point. The community's development was spurred by the completion of the Staunton and James River Turnpike, which was authorized by the Commonwealth of Virginia in 1818 and began construction in 1826. This turnpike connected the fertile farmlands of the Shenandoah Valley near Staunton to Scottsville on the James River, a distance of 43.5 miles (70.0 km). Batesville, which was located at the halfway point on the turnpike, saw an increase in traffic through the community as farmers took advantage of the new road to carry agricultural products to eastern markets. The barrel industry became one of the community's foremost industries as well as stagecoach repair.

By 1835, Batesville had grown to a community of around 70 residents. In this year Batesville's first post office opened. It served as an election precinct for the local area. Batesville continued to grow during the years prior to the outbreak of the American Civil War in 1861. Because of Batesville's position on the turnpike, the community's economy suffered little from the effects of the war. The war caused no damage to the physical structures in Batesville.

After the Civil War, the turnpike which had long spurred on Batesville's economic growth was turned over to the county and fell into disrepair as the county focused on more densely populated areas. The coming of the Virginia Central Railroad to Albemarle County before the civil war, and its revitalization after, took traffic away from the road through Batesville as it was a faster and more effective way of transporting goods. Although less traffic was available to sustain economic growth, Batesville nevertheless continued to grow due in part to the general prosperity of Albemarle County as a whole and the construction of the nearby Miller School.

The Batesville Historic District and Bellevue are listed on the National Register of Historic Places.
