= Kingston, Ohio =

- Village
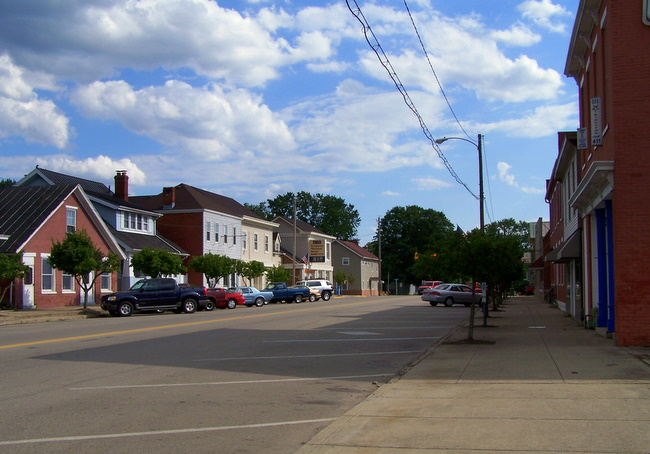
- Along Main Street
- Motto(s): "...Community, Friends, Family...a place to call home"
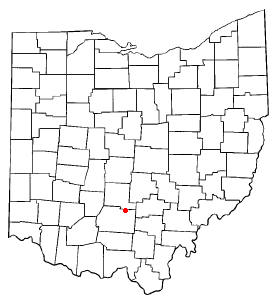
- Location of Kingston, Ohio

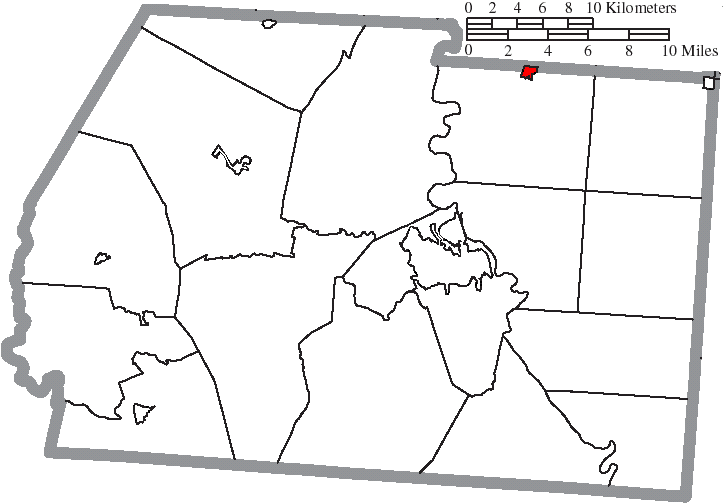
- Location of Kingston in Ross County
- Coordinates: 39°28′20″N 82°54′43″W
- Country: United States
- State: Ohio
- County: Ross

Area
  - Total: 0.37 sq mi (0.96 km^{2})
  - Land: 0.37 sq mi (0.96 km^{2})
  - Water: 0 sq mi (0.00 km^{2})
- Elevation: 791 ft (241 m)

Population (2020)
  - Total: 1,262
  - Density: 3,406.3/sq mi (1,315.19/km^{2})
- Time zone: UTC-5 (Eastern (EST))
  - Summer (DST): UTC-4 (EDT)
- ZIP code: 45644
- Area code: 740
- FIPS code: 39-40376
- GNIS feature ID: 2398352
- Website: https://www.villageofkingstonohio.com/

Kingston is a village in Ross County, Ohio, United States. The population was 1,262 at the 2020 census.

== History ==
Kingston was platted in 1816.

== Geography ==
According to the United States Census Bureau, the village has a total area of 0.37 square miles (0.96 km^{2}), all land.

== Demographics ==
Historical population
Census	Pop.	Note	%±
1850	336		—
1860	375		11.6%
1870	345		−8.0%
1880	442		28.1%
1890	751		69.9%
1900	735		−2.1%
1910	813		10.6%
1920	800		−1.6%
1930	857		7.1%
1940	864		0.8%
1950	958		10.9%
1960	1,066		11.3%
1970	1,157		8.5%
1980	1,208		4.4%
1990	1,153		−4.6%
2000	1,032		−10.5%
2010	1,032		0.0%
2020	1,262		22.3%
U.S. Decennial Census

=== 2010 census ===
As of the census of 2010, there were 1,032 people, 458 households, and 299 families living in the village. The population density was 2,789.2 inhabitants per square mile (1,076.9/km^{2}). There were 503 housing units at an average density of 1,359.5 per square mile (524.9/km^{2}). The racial makeup of the village was 98.8% White, 0.6% African American, 0.2% from other races, and 0.4% from two or more races. Hispanic or Latino of any race were 1.5% of the population.

There were 458 households, of which 29.7% had children under the age of 18 living with them, 46.1% were married couples living together, 12.4% had a female householder with no husband present, 6.8% had a male householder with no wife present, and 34.7% were non-families. 29.5% of all households were made up of individuals, and 16.8% had someone living alone who was 65 years of age or older. The average household size was 2.25 and the average family size was 2.73.

The median age in the village was 40.2 years. 22.3% of residents were under the age of 18; 7.1% were between the ages of 18 and 24; 27.7% were from 25 to 44; 25.5% were from 45 to 64; and 17.4% were 65 years of age or older. The gender makeup of the village was 48.4% male and 51.6% female.

=== 2000 census ===
As of the census of 2000, there were 1,032 people, 452 households, and 287 families living in the village. The population density was 2,795.8 inhabitants per square mile (1,079.5/km^{2}). There were 485 housing units at an average density of 1,313.9 per square mile (507.3/km^{2}). The racial makeup of the village was 98.84% White, 0.39% African American, 0.19% Native American, 0.10% Asian, and 0.48% from two or more races. Hispanic or Latino of any race were 0.58% of the population.

There were 452 households, out of which 25.2% had children under the age of 18 living with them, 49.8% were married couples living together, 10.0% had a female householder with no husband present, and 36.3% were non-families. 33.0% of all households were made up of individuals, and 15.7% had someone living alone who was 65 years of age or older. The average household size was 2.19 and the average family size was 2.72.

In the village, the population was spread out, with 19.8% under the age of 18, 6.7% from 18 to 24, 27.7% from 25 to 44, 25.3% from 45 to 64, and 20.5% who were 65 years of age or older. The median age was 43 years. For every 100 females there were 84.3 males. For every 100 females age 18 and over, there were 83.6 males.

The median income for a household in the village was $33,636, and the median income for a family was $45,729. Males had a median income of $35,804 versus $25,481 for females. The per capita income for the village was $19,343. About 5.6% of families and 10.1% of the population were below the poverty line, including 7.2% of those under age 18 and 13.4% of those age 65 or over.

== Education ==
Kingston's children attend the schools of the Zane Trace School District, including Zane Trace High School.

Kingston has a public library, a branch of the Chillicothe & Ross County Public Library.
