= Bryantsburg, Indiana =

- Unincorporated community
- Location within Indiana Location within the United States
- Coordinates: 38°53′09″N 85°22′28″W
- Country: United States
- State: Indiana
- County: Jefferson
- Township: Monroe
- Elevation: 883 ft (269 m)
- ZIP code: 47250
- FIPS code: 18-08722
- GNIS feature ID: 449625

Bryantsburg is an unincorporated community in Monroe Township, Jefferson County, Indiana.

== History ==
Bryantsburg was platted on March 5, 1834, by Jacob Bryant with 32 lots. Thomas Bell platted an 11-lot addition on March 25, 1851; Robert Kinnear, an addition of eight lots on June 27–28, 1853. Bryantsburg had a post office from June 10, 1834, to December 12, 1856; Jan. 18, 1858, through Dec. 10, 1872, and finally from March 1, 1873, through June 29, 1907.

The Bryantsburg Presbyterian Church was formed by September 22, 1854, when the trustees of the parent Monroe Presbyterian Church sold land to the Bryantsburg Trustees. The deed mentions a lot on which the Bryantsburg Church "now stands." The 1855 and 1857 minutes of the General Assembly of the Presbyterian Church in the U.S.A. reported Bryantsburg had 20 communicants. Fifteen were listed in the 1862 and 1863 minutes. Its operation had probably ended by April 30, 1867, when the church trustees sold the lot and meeting house.

The town existed on both sides of the Michigan Road (U.S. 421), but the west portion, which was the larger section, became part of the former Jefferson Proving Ground in 1941, leaving a handful of houses on the east side.

According to a history of schools compiled just after the government had taken the land, the Bryantsburg School opened in 1822 as a subscription school and closed on March 7, 1941. It was located about a mile north of Bryantsburg on the west side of the Michigan Road.

The town was described in an 1889 history: "Bryantsburg: Monroe township, was laid off by Jacob Bryant, March 5th, 1834. It contains a post-office, three stores, two blacksmith shops. It has a population of about 60. It is in section eleven, town V, range X east."

The Indiana Gazetteer and Business Directory of 1890 described Bryantsburg thus: "An incorporated village located in Monroe township, Jefferson county, 10 miles north of Madison, the county seat, usual banking, and shipping point. Population 80. Mail, tri-weekly. E. Roberts, postmaster."
