= Davant, Louisiana =

Unincorporated community in Louisiana, U.S.

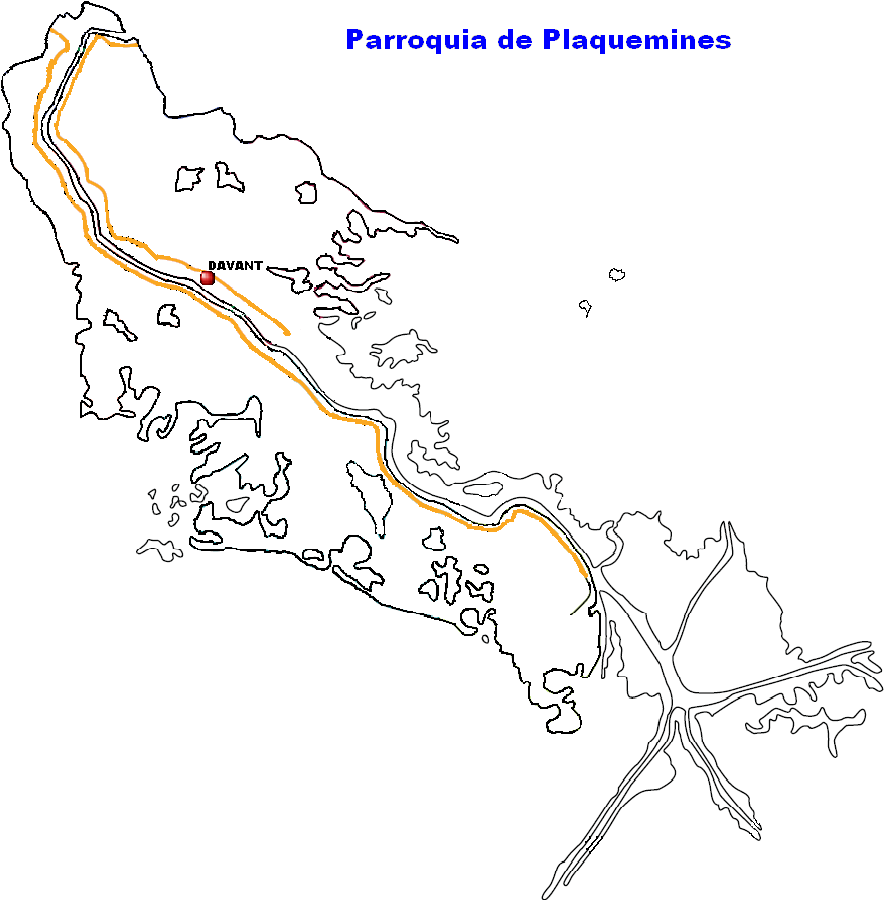
Location of Davant in Plaquemines Parish.

Davant is an unincorporated community located in the delta of the Mississippi River in the parish of Plaquemines, Louisiana, United States.

== Geography ==
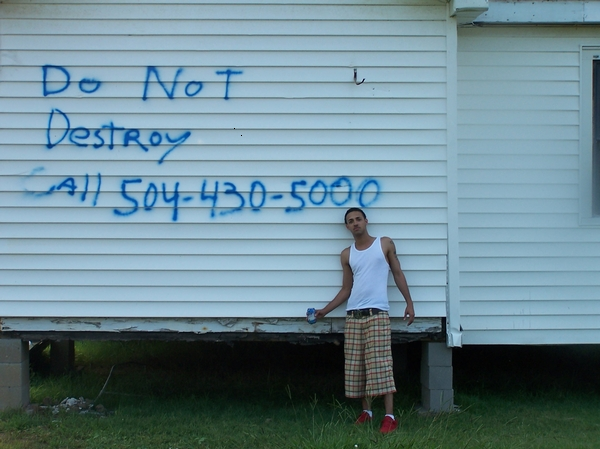
A resident of Davant standing in front of his grandparents house which had floated off their property. The writings "Do not destroy" in front of his house was to let local government clean up crews know the house was going to be moved and restored.

Davant is located at 29°36′30″N 89°50′54″W, 4 miles (6.44km) north of Pointe à la Hache, the seat of Plaquemines Parish. Davant stands at approximately 3 feet (0.91 m) above sea level.

== Industry ==
Davant is home to the Host at Davant, one of the largest bulk shipping terminals on the U.S. Gulf Coast.
