= The Bellevue Hotel =

The Bellevue Hotel can refer to:

- Hotel Bellevue Palace, a five-star luxury hotel located in the Old City of Bern, Switzerland
- The Bellevue-Stratford Hotel, luxury hotel located in Philadelphia
- Bellevue Hotel, Brisbane in Queensland, Australia (demolished 1979)
- Bilderberg Bellevue Hotel Dresden, a hotel in Dresden
- Grand Hotel Bellevue, a hotel that existed in Berlin in the 19th and 20th centuries
