= Belleview, Indiana =

- Unincorporated community
- Location within Indiana Location within the United States
- Coordinates: 38°51′21″N 85°22′41″W
- Country: United States
- State: Indiana
- County: Jefferson
- Township: Monroe
- Elevation: 886 ft (270 m)
- ZIP code: 47250
- FIPS code: 18-04438
- GNIS feature ID: 430779

Belleview is an unincorporated community in Monroe Township, Jefferson County, Indiana.

The community and post office was originally called Mud Lick until residents changed the name to the more pleasant-sounding Belleview. The Belleview post office was discontinued in 1906, having existed since 1855.
