= Belleview (Middletown, Delaware) =

Historic house in Delaware, US

- U.S. National Register of Historic Places
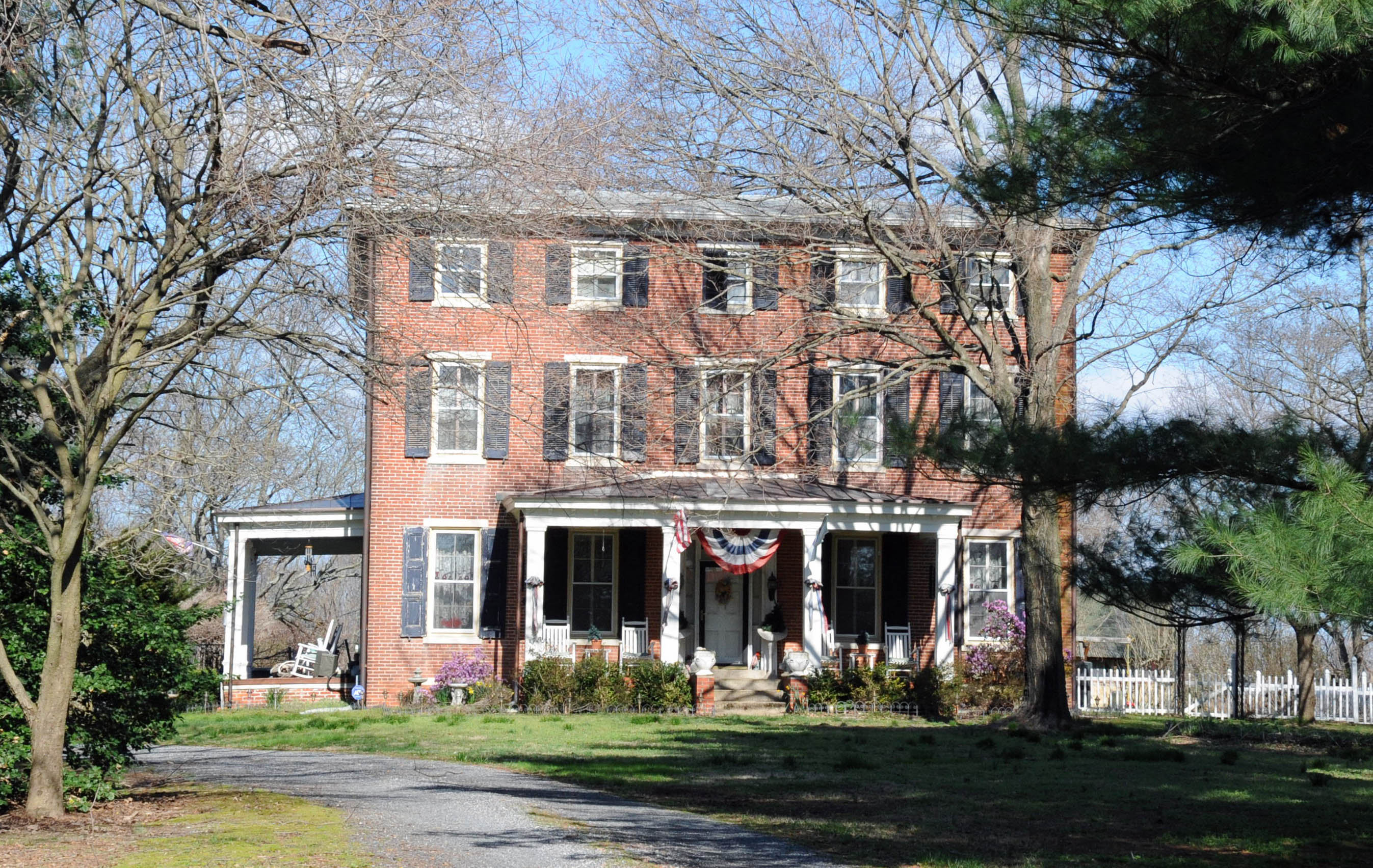

- Location within Delaware Location within the United States
- Location: 855 Shallcross Lake Road in St. Georges Hundred, near Middletown, Delaware
- Coordinates: 39.490963°N 75.664741°W
- Area: 1 acre (0.40 ha)
- Built: 1845
- Architectural style: Greek Revival, Italianate, Federal
- MPS: Rebuilding St. Georges Hundred 1850--1880 TR
- NRHP reference No.: 85002104
- Added to NRHP: September 13, 1985

Belleview is a historic home located near Middletown in New Castle County, Delaware, United States. It was built about 1845, and is a three-story L-shaped five-by-five-bay, brick structure. It has a shallow hipped roof with wide overhanging eaves and bracketed cornice in the Italianate style.

It was listed on the National Register of Historic Places in 1985.
