= Belle Vue (Bellevue, Tennessee) =

- U.S. National Register of Historic Places
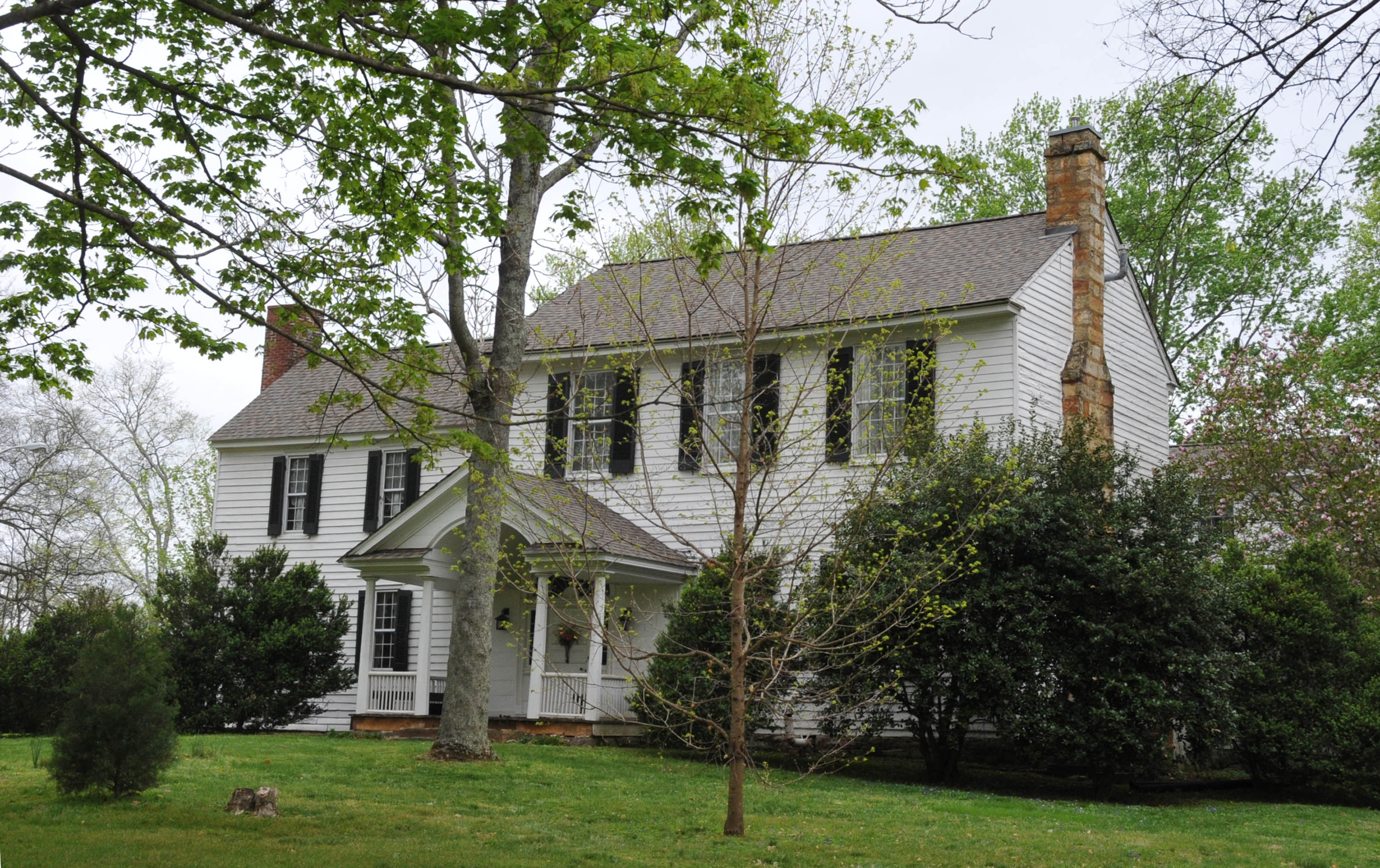
- Belle Vue in 2008

- Location within Tennessee
- Location: 7306 Old Harding Road, Bellevue, Tennessee, U.S.
- Coordinates: 36.06654°N 86.93805°W
- Area: 0 acres (0 ha)
- Built: c. 1820
- Architectural style: Colonial Revival
- NRHP reference No.: 73001758
- Added to NRHP: October 25, 1973

Belle Vue II is a historic mansion in Bellevue, a suburb of Nashville, Tennessee, USA. It was a Southern plantation worked by enslaved African Americans prior to the American Civil War of 1861–1865. After the war, it remained in the same family until the 1970s.

== Location ==
The mansion is located at 7306 Old Harding Road in Bellevue, a suburb of Nashville in Davidson County, Tennessee.

== History ==
The house stood in this spot as a two-story log cabin prior to 1800, when James DeMoss purchased the land. DeMoss lived here with his wife, Elizabeth Newsom DeMoss. When DeMoss departed for New Orleans, Louisiana in 1820, his wealth allowed him to expand the footprint of the house. It was redesigned in the Classical Revival architectural style, with French block-printed wallpaper in the parlor. It was also renamed "Belle Vue II", which means "Beautiful View" in French, after the original Belle Vue, his brother Abraham's house on the adjoining property.

After James DeMoss died in 1848, his widow lived in the house with her son, Louis DeMoss, Jr. After the latter died, the house was inherited by his son, William E. DeMoss, a physician, who lived here with his mother. After the war, DeMoss married Tabitha Allison in 1871. When she died in 1916, the house was inherited by her nephew, T. A. Baugh. By 1947, Baugh attended electricity to the house and moved in with his wife.

In 1972, the house was purchased by Sparky Forster, with only seven acres left around the house.

== Architectural significance ==
It has been listed on the National Register of Historic Places since October 25, 1973.
