= Bellevue (Macon, Georgia) =

Coordinates: 32.8590°N 83.6927°W

Bellevue is a primarily African-American neighborhood on the west side of Macon, Georgia, United States. The area is surrounded by the Wesleyan neighborhood to the north-northwest, Vineville to the northeast, Hillcrest to the east, Unionville to the southeast, and Bloomfield to the south-southwest The area is served by one elementary school, Brookdale Elementary.
