= Bellevue (Morganton, North Carolina) =

Historic house in North Carolina, United States

- U.S. National Register of Historic Places
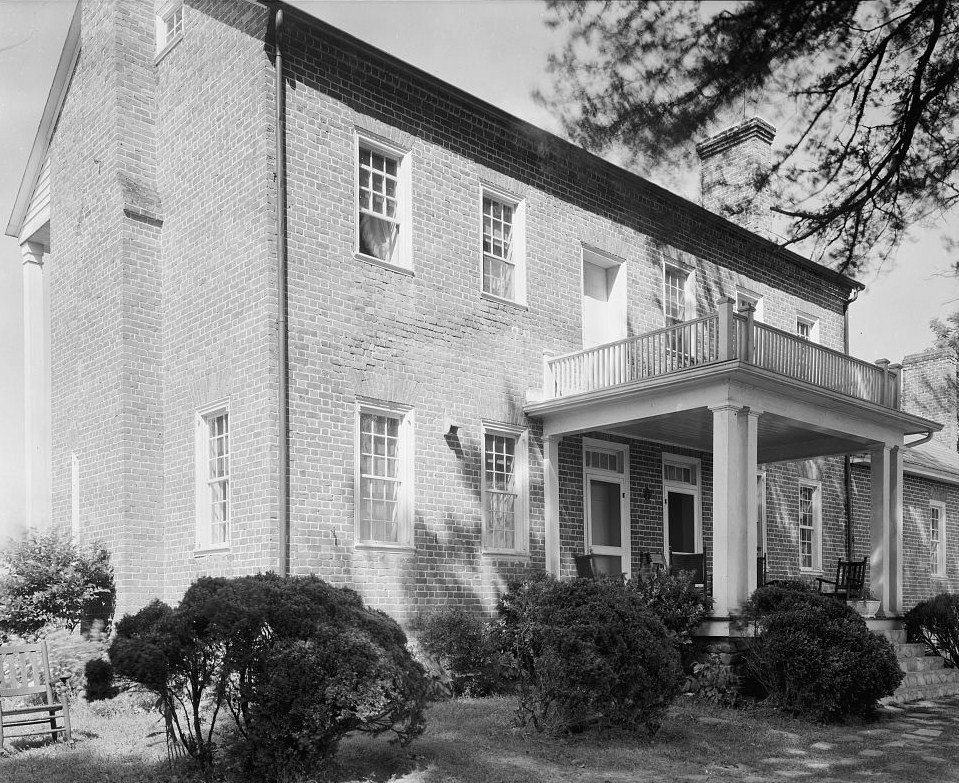
- Bellevue (1938)

- Location within North Carolina Location within the United States
- Location: On SR 1419, N of Morganton off NC 18, near Morganton, North Carolina
- Coordinates: 35°46′55″N 81°42′33″W
- Area: 450 acres (180 ha)
- Built: 1826
- Architectural style: Federal
- NRHP reference No.: 73001296
- Added to NRHP: December 4, 1973

Bellevue is a historic plantation house located near Morganton, Burke County, North Carolina. It was built about 1826, and consists of a two-story, six bay brick structure, with an original one-story wing, in the Federal style. Most of its brickwork is laid in Flemish bond It has a Quaker plan interior.

It was listed on the National Register of Historic Places in 1973.
