= Batesville Historic District (Batesville, Virginia) =

Historic district in Virginia, US

- U.S. National Register of Historic Places
- U.S. Historic district
- Virginia Landmarks Register
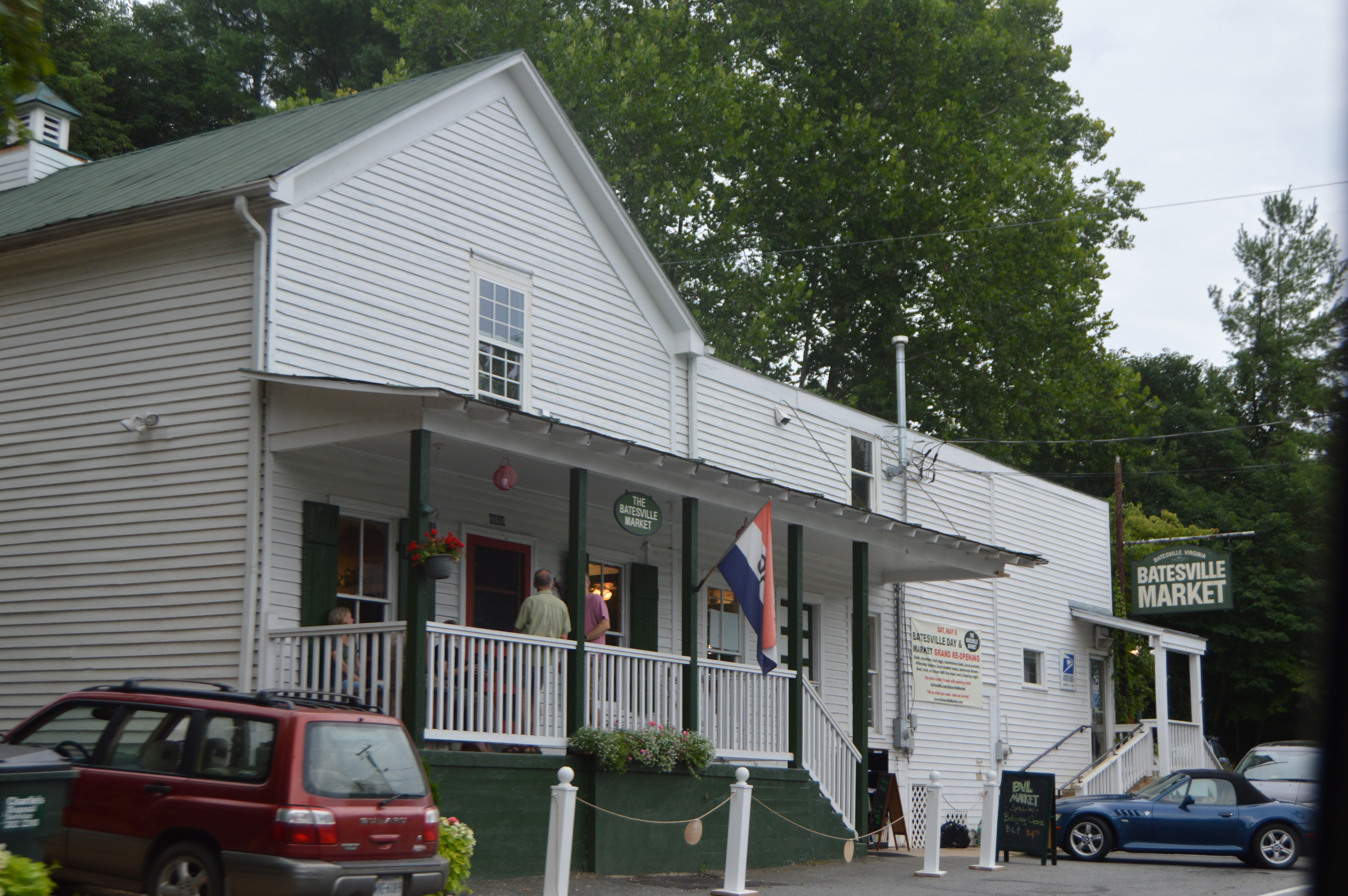
- General store and post office

- Location within Virginia Location within the United States
- Location: Batesville, Albemarle County, Virginia, USA
- Coordinates: 37°59′42″N 78°43′27″W
- Area: 135 acres (55 ha)
- Built: Various
- Architectural style: Colonial Revival, Classical Revival, Greek Revival, Federal
- NRHP reference No.: 99001500
- VLR No.: 002-2212

Significant dates
- Added to NRHP: December 9, 1999
- Designated VLR: June 16, 1999

The Batesville Historic District is a national historic district located at Batesville, Albemarle County, Virginia. In 1999, when it was listed on the National Register of Historic Places, it included 33 buildings deemed to contribute to the historic character of the area. They include representative examples of the early-19th century Federal Style, the mid-19th century Greek Revival Style, simple late-Victorian styles from the late-19th century- and early-20th century, Classical Revival and Colonial Revival styles. Notable buildings include the Batesville Elementary School (1922), Batesville Public School (c. 1870), Mount Ed Baptist Church, Batesville Methodist Church (1861), Dr. Smith House, the Barskdale House, Hill House (c. 1900), and Page's Store (also known as the Charles Joseph Store and Batesville Store, c. 1900).
