= Bellevue (Pascagoula, Mississippi) =

Historic house in Mississippi, United States

- U.S. National Register of Historic Places
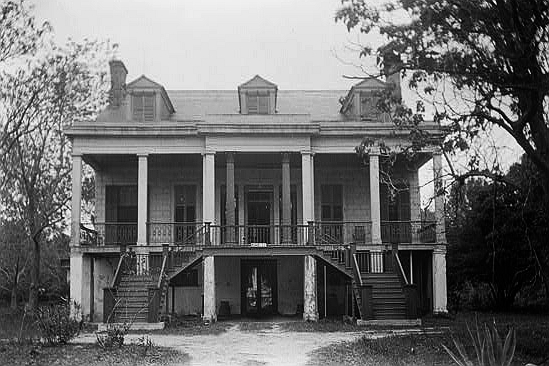
- Bellevue in 1936

- Location within Mississippi Location within the United States
- Location: 3401 Beach Blvd., Pascagoula, Mississippi
- Coordinates: 30°20′41″N 88°31′41″W
- Area: 2.1 acres (0.85 ha)
- Built: 1850
- Architectural style: Greek Revival
- NRHP reference No.: 02001498
- Added to NRHP: December 12, 2002

Bellevue, also known as the "Longfellow House", is a historic home in Pascagoula, Mississippi facing the Gulf of Mexico and is listed on the National Register of Historic Places.

It was built in 1850 as a home for slave trader Daniel Smith Graham. Since then, the building has served a number of functions including a girls' school, a private residence, as well as, a private resort and club owned by Ingalls Shipbuilding. Legend has it that Henry Wadsworth Longfellow once stayed here when he wrote his work The Building of the Ship but little evidence has emerged to support this.

Later, the property was purchased by Richard Scruggs and his wife, Dianne, who restored the structure and donated it to the University of Mississippi Foundation. After being damaged by Hurricane Katrina, it was sold in 2006 to Drs. Randy and Tracy Roth for use as a private residence.
