= Bellevue, Caldwell Parish, Louisiana =

Bellevue, Louisiana
- Unincorporated community
- Location within Louisiana Location within the United States
- Coordinates: 32°06′47″N 92°02′57″W
- Country: United States
- State: Louisiana
- Parish: Caldwell
- Elevation: 66 ft (20 m)
- Time zone: UTC-6 (Central (CST))
  - Summer (DST): UTC-5 (CDT)
- Area code: 318
- GNIS feature ID: 532930

Bellevue is an unincorporated community in Caldwell Parish, Louisiana, United States.
