= Bellevue (Batesville, Virginia) =

Historic house in Virginia, United States

- U.S. National Register of Historic Places
- Virginia Landmarks Register
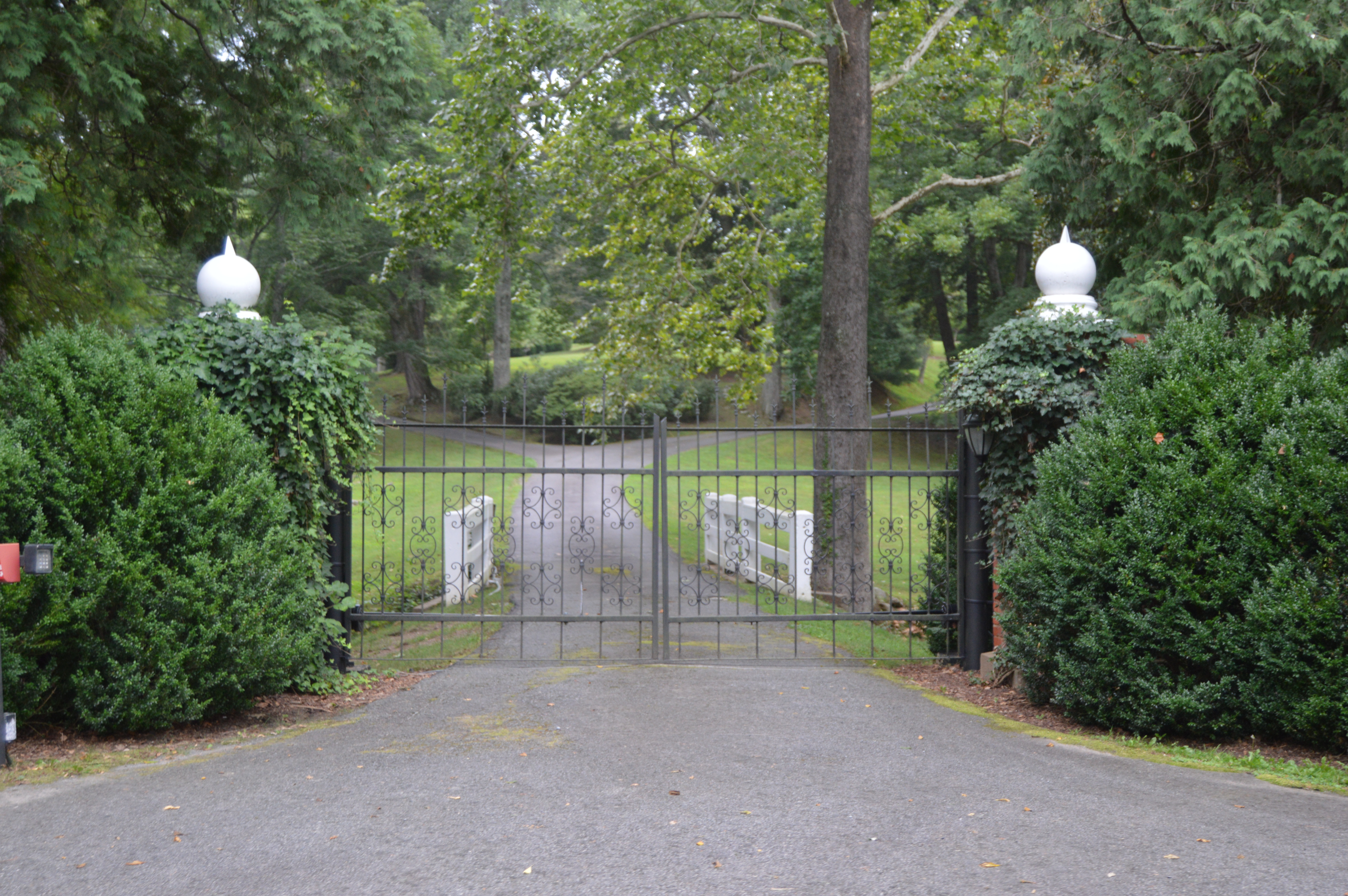
- Gate to the property

- Location within Virginia Location within the United States
- Location: South side VA 692, 3,500 feet (1,100 m) west of the junction with VA 637, near Batesville, Virginia
- Coordinates: 38°00′37″N 78°45′15″W
- Area: 145.3 acres (58.8 ha)
- Built: 1859, 1913, 1920
- Architectural style: Colonial Revival, Greek Revival, Italianate
- NRHP reference No.: 91000886
- VLR No.: 002-0847

Significant dates
- Added to NRHP: July 9, 1991
- Designated VLR: April 17, 1991

Bellevue, also known as Wavertree Hall Farm, is a historic home and farm complex located near Batesville, Albemarle County, Virginia. The main house was built in 1859, and is a two-story, hip-roofed brick building with a two-story pedimented portico. It features wide bracketed eaves in the Italianate style and Greek Revival trim and woodwork. There are two 1 1/2-story brick wings on either side of the main block added about 1913, and a two-story brick south wing added in the 1920s. Also on the property are an antebellum log slave house, several tenant houses, a pump house, chicken house, and stable and barns. There is also an unusual underground room built into the north side of one of the garden terraces.

It was added to the National Register of Historic Places in 1991.
