= Bellevue State Park =

Bellevue State Park can refer to either of two state parks in the United States:

- Bellevue State Park (Delaware)
- Bellevue State Park (Iowa)
