= Bellevue, Saint Thomas, U.S. Virgin Islands =

Coordinates: 18.32523°N 64.92042°W

Bellevue is a settlement on the island of Saint Thomas in the United States Virgin Islands.
