= Bellevue, Saint Croix, U.S. Virgin Islands =

Bellevue
- Village
- Location in Saint Croix, United States Virgin Islands Bellevue (the U.S. Virgin Islands)
- Coordinates: 17°44′52″N 64°44′01″W
- Country: United States Virgin Islands
- Island: Saint Croix
- Time zone: UTC-4 (AST)

Bellevue is a settlement on the island of Saint Croix in the United States Virgin Islands. It is a western suburb of Christiansted. The geographic area is 140 acres of which the majority are forested. Of the 140 acres half 70 acres belong to the Bond family which since 1956 has owned a federally registered Caribbean Mahogany Reforestation Tree Farm. The property adjoins the Estate Thomas research property belonging to the International Institute of Tropical Forestry of the United States Forest Service.

== History ==
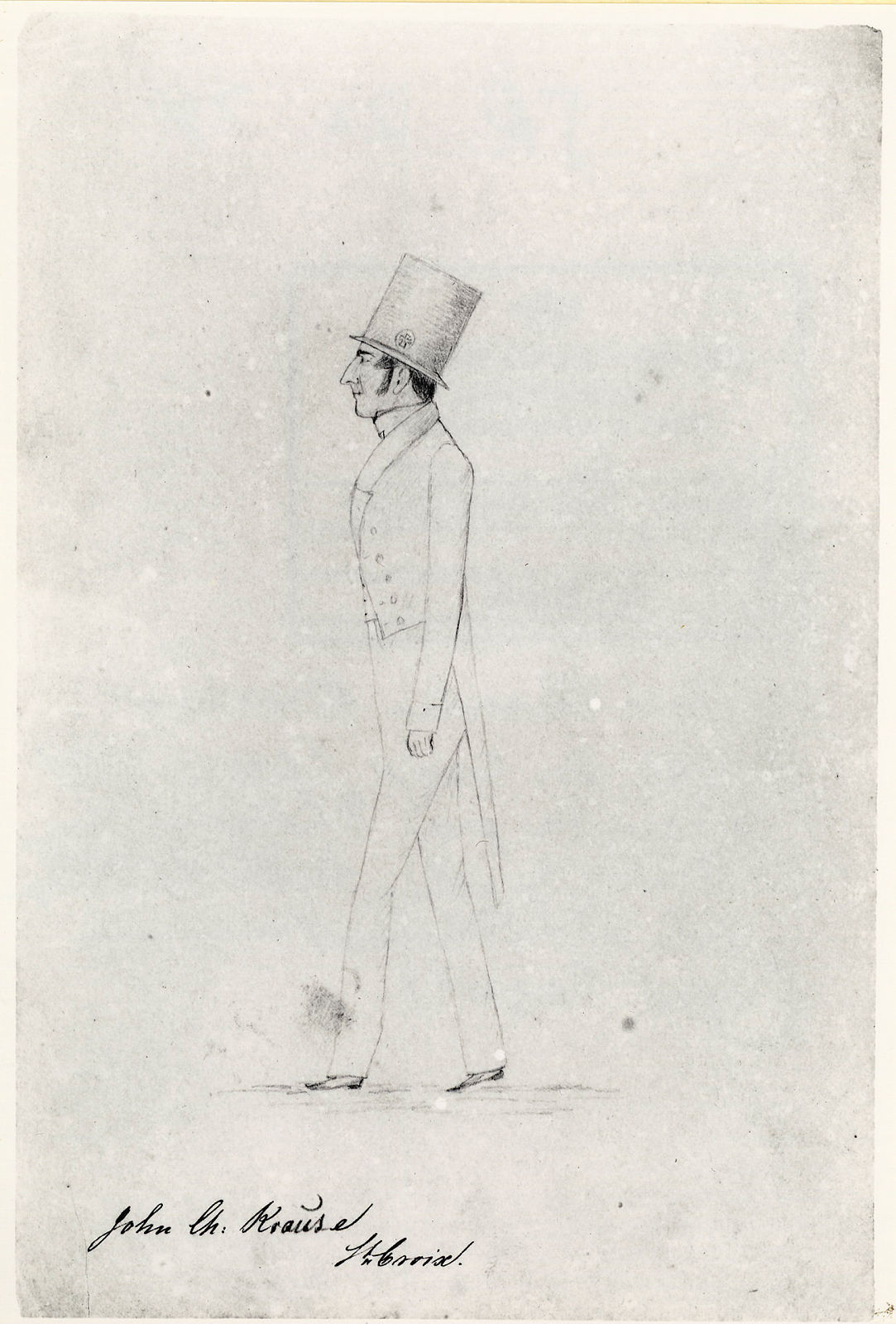
John Charles Krause

Bellevue is a former sugar plantation (Company Quarter No. 35, Christiansteds Police District). In 1816, it had an area of 150 acres of which 79 acres in canes and 71 acres was under other cultivation. On 19 August 1822, it was sold by auction to Dicks & Clement, for Ps. 79,781. On 12 July 1824, it was sold at auction to the Royal Loan Commission, for Ps. 25,000.

On 9 October 1826, it was sold by the Royal Loan Commission to John Charles Krause, for Ps. 72,289. John Charles Krause resided on the estate with his wife Mary and their six children at the time of the 1741 census. Another family member, M. W. Krause (aged 21), was then also registered as part of the household. The first member of the Krause family to settle on St. Croix was Johan Gottfried Krause. The plantation Annaberg on the island of Saint John in the Danish West Indies was also owned by the Krause family.

On 8 January 1845, Bellevue was sold by auction to the Royal Treasury for Ps. 19,000. On 9 June 1846, it was sold by the Royal Treasury to a partnership consisting of Capt. John Christmas, B. P. de Nully and W. de Nully, for Ps. 9000. The sugar works were dismantled in 1846.
