= Earl Dennison Thomas =

US Army brigadier general

- Thomas c. 1907
- Born: 4 January 1847; Woodstock, Illinois, US
- Died: 17 February 1921 (aged 74); Laurel, Maryland, US
- Burial place: Arlington National Cemetery
- Education: United States Military Academy
- Spouse: Clara Medora Church (m. 1869–1921)
- Children: 4
- Relatives: Robert Alexander (son in law); Charles J. Symmonds (son in law)
- Military career
- Allegiance: Union (American Civil War); United States
- Service: Union Army; United States Military Academy; United States Army
- Service years: 1862–1865 (Union Army); 1865–1869 (USMA); 1869–1911 (US Army)
- Rank: Brigadier General
- Unit: US Cavalry Branch
- Commands: Troop D, 5th Cavalry Regiment; Fort Ringgold; Fort Robinson; Fort Keogh; 11th Cavalry Regiment; Camp Wallace; 13th Cavalry Regiment; Fort Des Moines; Department of the Missouri; Department of the Colorado
- Conflicts: American Civil War; American Indian Wars; Spanish–American War; Military Government of Porto Rico; Moro Rebellion; Provisional Government of Cuba

Earl D. Thomas (4 January 1847 – 17 February 1921) was a career officer in the United States Army. A veteran of the American Civil War, he attended the United States Military Academy at West Point from 1865 to 1869, after which he began a career in the Cavalry. Thomas went on to serve in the American Indian Wars, Spanish–American War, Military Government of Porto Rico, Moro Rebellion, and Provisional Government of Cuba. He attained the rank of brigadier general, and his commands included: Troop D, 5th Cavalry Regiment; Fort Ringgold; Fort Robinson; Fort Keogh; the 11th Cavalry Regiment; Camp Wallace, Philippines; the 13th Cavalry Regiment; Fort Des Moines, the Department of the Missouri, and the Department of the Colorado.

== Early life ==
Thomas as a West Point cadet in 1869

Earl Dennison Thomas (Note: Some sources spell Thomas's middle name as "Denison.") was born in Woodstock, Illinois (Note: Some sources say he was born in McHenry, Illinois or McHenry County, Illinois.) on 4 January 1847, a son of Edwin Eldridge Thomas and Naomi Ruth (Patterson) Thomas. He was raised and educated in Woodstock and attended Todd Seminary for Boys from 1859 to 1861. At the start of the American Civil War in April 1861, he attempted to enlist in the 8th Illinois Infantry Regiment of the Union Army; at age 14, he was turned down because he was too young, so he joined the unit as a drummer boy. In April 1862 he was 15 and was allowed to enlist in the regiment's Company H as a private. He continued to serve in the 8th Illinois until the end of the war and advanced to corporal and sergeant in Company H, then received appointment as the regimental sergeant major. Thomas took part in all the 8th Illinois' wartime engagements, including Fort Henry, Fort Donelson, Shiloh, Corinth, Thompson's Station, Port Gibson, Raymond, Champion Hill, and Vicksburg.

After the end of the Civil War, army leaders offered Thomas a direct commission or admission to the United States Military Academy (West Point). He chose West Point, attended from 1865 to 1869, and graduated ranked 23rd of 39. Among his classmates who also served as general officers were Samuel Escue Tillman, William P. Duvall, Charles Morton, and William W. Robinson Jr. Among his prominent classmates who did not attain general's rank were Eric Bergland, Arthur Sherburne Hardy, John Gregory Bourke, and James Ezekiel Porter. At graduation, Thomas received his commission as a second lieutenant of Cavalry.

== Start of career ==
After receiving his commission in June 1869, Thomas was assigned to the 5th Cavalry Regiment and posted to Fort McPherson, Nebraska. He remained at Fort McPherson until February 1872, and his duties included American Indian Wars scouting and patrols. In June 1870, he was with a detachment that included Buffalo Bill as lead scout when they engaged a band of the Lakota people in combat near the Red Willow Creek. In March 1872, Thomas was promoted to first lieutenant, after which he was assigned to the garrison at the Presidio of San Francisco. In July 1872, he was assigned to scouting and patrol duties at Gila Bend, Arizona. In December 1872, he took part in a battle against a force of the Apache people near the Salt River. He also took part in subsequent engagements near the Gila River in January 1873 and the Diamond River in February 1873.

=== Family ===
In 1869, Thomas married Clara Medora Church of Woodstock, Illinois. They were married until his death and were the parents of four children:

Helen Naomi Thomas (1870–1948), the wife of Major Benjamin Franklin Wade (1866–1953) and daughter in law of Major General James F. Wade.

Mollie Augur Thomas (1871–1953), the wife of Major General Robert Alexander.

George Crook Thomas (1875–1959), the wife of Brigadier General Charles J. Symmonds. (Note: Thomas had hoped for a boy and named his daughter for George Crook, his commanding officer. She was known as "Georgie" as a girl and "George" from her teenage years through adulthood.)

Earl Dennison Thomas Jr. (1879–1910), a clerk for the commissary of the army's Department of the Colorado.

== Continued career ==
Thomas as a major in 1898

Thomas was assigned to Fort McDowell, Arizona from September 1872 to April 1873. From April to August 1873 he performed continued duty in Arizona, first at Fort Date Creek, then at Camp Hualapai near Aztec Pass. He served at Fort Whipple, Arizona from August 1873 to March 1875, which included several Indian Wars scouting expeditions. From March 1875 to June 1878, he served as aide–de–camp to Brevet Major General August Kautz, the commander of the Department of Arizona, while also performing duty as the department's acting engineer officer. He served at Fort Washakie, Wyoming until February 1880. He was the 5th Cavalry's acting assistant quartermaster and performed several detached staff duties from February 1880 to February 1883. He was then assigned to duty at Fort Niobrara, Nebraska, where he served until May 1885. In April 1885, Thomas received promotion to captain.

Thomas was posted to Fort Reno, Indian Territory from May to July 1885. He was then assigned to duty at Fort Riley, Kansas where he served until July 1887, including an expedition against the Ute people from June to October 1886. He was posted to Fort Sill, Indian Territory from July 1887 to July 1890. This posting included responding to a disturbance by the Chickasaw Nation in December 1888. In May 1889, he performed temporary duty purchasing horses for use by the army, and in December 1889 he was assigned to temporary duty measuring and surveying locations for proposed Indian Territory roads. In February 1890, Thomas received a brevet promotion to first lieutenant to date from June 1870 as recognition of his gallantry while assigned to Fort McPherson. At the same time, he received a brevet promotion to captain for heroism in action during fighting at Cave Creek, Arizona in December 1872, and distinguished service during American Indian Wars fighting in Arizona during April 1874. In July 1890, he took part in the army's response to American Indian disturbances at Anadarko.

While continuing to serve at Fort Sill, from May to June 1891, Thomas was in charge of the escort for the Cherokee Commission appointed by President Benjamin Harrison to negotiate the sale of land by the Cherokee Nation for settlement by whites. In March and April 1902 he assisted in opening portions of the Cheyenne and Arapaho Indian Reservation for white settlement and removing whites who had settled the land illegally (Boomers). In August 1892, Thomas served temporary duty inspecting the Arkansas National Guard. In October 1892, he took part in the dedicatory ceremonies for the World's Columbian Exposition in Chicago. In early 1893, Thomas was assigned to Fort McIntosh, Texas, where he served until October 1894, including temporary duty inspecting Cavalry horses in July 1894. He was then assigned to Fort Sam Houston, Texas, where he served until January 1898. During this posting, Thomas performed temporary duty at the 1897 Tyler Fruit Palace, a major annual Tyler, Texas horticultural and agricultural fair. In January 1898, he marched with part of the 5th Cavalry to Fort Ringgold, Texas, where he commanded Troop D and the post from February to May 1898.

== Later career ==
Thomas's gravestone at Arlington National Cemetery

The Spanish–American War started in April 1898; in May, Thomas was promoted to major of United States Volunteers and assigned to duty in Texas inspecting horses intended for use by Cavalry units of the Volunteers and the 1st Texas Cavalry, a unit of the Texas State Guard. In February 1899, he was promoted to major in the 8th Cavalry Regiment and ordered to duty in Mayagüez with the Military Government of Porto Rico. He was discharged from the Volunteers in March 1899 and transferred back to the 5th Cavalry in May 1899. Thomas then served as inspector general of 1st Division, First Army Corps at Chickamauga Park, Georgia until June, after which he was inspector general of the 1st, 2nd, and 3rd Divisions of the Fourth Army Corps until June 1899. In July 1899, he returned to Puerto Rico, where he served until August 1900 as an associate justice of the U.S. Provisional Court. He was then assigned to temporary duty in the office of the army's quartermaster general, where he served until December 1901 as inspector of horses intended for use by Cavalry and Field Artillery units. Thomas was promoted to lieutenant colonel of the 13th Cavalry Regiment in November 1901.

Thomas commanded the post at Fort Robinson, Nebraska from January to April 1902. He then commanded the post at Fort Keogh, Montana, where he served until February 1903. Thomas commanded the 13th Cavalry during its travel to the Philippines for Moro Rebellion duty at Calamba. In April 1903, he was promoted to colonel of the 7th Cavalry Regiment, then immediately transferred to command of the 11th Cavalry Regiment, and he commanded the regiment and the post at Camp Wallace, La Union until March 1904. From 1904 to 1906, Thomas commanded the 11th Cavalry and Fort Des Moines, Iowa. In addition, he performed additional duty as inspector of Cavalry and Field Artillery horses at East St. Louis and Chicago, Illinois, Saint Paul, Minnesota, and Kansas City, Missouri. From 1906 to 1907, he commanded the 11th Cavalry at Havana and Pinar del Río during the Provisional Government of Cuba.

In April 1907, Thomas was promoted to brigadier general. In May, he returned to the United States from Cuba and assumed command of the Department of the Missouri. In June, he transferred to command of the Department of the Colorado. He continued in this position until attaining the mandatory retirement age of 64 in January 1911. In retirement, Thomas resided in Laurel, Maryland. He died in Laurel on 17 February 1921. Thomas was buried at Arlington National Cemetery.

== Dates of rank ==
Thomas's dates of rank were:

- Private to Sergeant Major, 1 April 1862 to 30 April 1865
- Cadet, United States Military Academy, 1 July 1865 to 14 June 1869
- Second Lieutenant, 15 June 1869
- First Lieutenant (Brevet), 8 June 1870 (awarded 27 February 1890)
- First Lieutenant, 1 March 1872
- Captain (Brevet), 28 December 1872 (awarded 27 February 1890)
- Captain, 1 April 1885
- Major (United States Volunteers), 12 May 1898
- Major, 14 February 1899
- Lieutenant Colonel, 16 November 1901
- Colonel, 19 April 1903
- Brigadier General, 18 April 1907
- Brigadier General (Retired), 4 January 1911
