= Hualapai War =

1865–1870, United States v. Natives

- Part of the American Indian Wars, Yavapai Wars
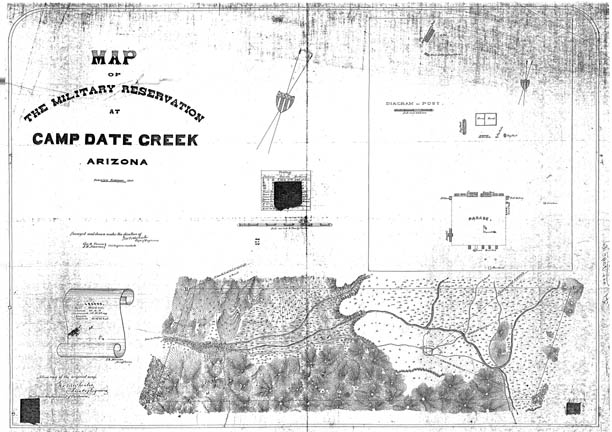
- A map of Camp Date Creek and the adjoining Hualapai reservation in 1869.
Date	1865–1870
Location	Arizona Territory
Result	United States victory

Belligerents
United States: Mohave Scouts	Hualapai; Yavapai; Havasupai

Commanders and leaders
William Hardy; William Redwood Price	Anasa †; Wauba Yuba †; Sherum; Leve Leve; Hitchi Hitchi; Hualapai Charley

Strength
Unknown	~250 warriors

The Hualapai War, or Walapai War, was an armed conflict fought from 1865 to 1870 between the Hualapai native Americans and the United States in Arizona Territory. The Yavapai also participated on the side of the Hualapai and Mohave scouts were employed by the United States Army. Following the death of the prominent Yavapai leader Anasa in April 1865, the natives began raiding American settlements which provoked a response by the United States Army forces stationed in the area. By the spring of 1869 disease forced the majority of the Hualapais to surrender though some skirmishing continued for almost two more years.

== War ==
Tensions between the Hualapai people and settlers began with encroachment of Indian lands. The Hualapai lived in the area between the Grand Canyon and the Bill Williams River. In 1857 Edward Fitzgerald Beale carved a road through Hualapai territory, leading to Needles, California, and in 1863, gold was discovered in the Prescott Valley. The gold rush brought a steady flow of miners and other settlers to the area so in 1864 Captain William Hardy built a toll road through Hualapai territory between Prescott and Bull Head City, which was then known as Hardyville. The road later spread out, leading to other places such as Fort Mohave and the Colorado River ports. Relations with the natives were generally peaceful and Hardy was able to acquire a fortune by building a ferry across the Colorado River and by taxing the settlers who used his road. However, in April 1865, drunken settlers killed Anasa during a meeting which led the Yavapai to wage war. The Hualapai called on their Havasupai and Yavapai allies to help them fight and they accepted, warriors under Chief Leve Leve (half-brother to Sherum and Hualapai Charley, both Chiefs of the Middle Mountain People subtribe) of the Amat Whala Pa'a (Mad hwa:la Ba:' – "Hualapai Mountains band") of the Yavapai Fighters subtribe assembled. In all there were about 250 Hualapai warriors, and an unknown number of Yavapai and Apache allies, facing hundreds of United States Army troops and militia. At the time, there was no distinction between the Yavapai and the Western Apache people. Due to their close relationship with tribes such as the Tonto Apache, the word Yavapai was not then in use so the Yavapai was considered as Tonto Apaches, or Apache-Mohaves. The actual fighting took the form of guerrilla warfare, in which small bands of natives cut off Hardy's road and raided using hit and run tactics. It was not until Captain Hardy negotiated a peace treaty with the Hualapai at Camp Beale's Spring that the raids were ceased. Nine months later, during another meeting with the Hualapai chiefs, settlers killed Wauba Yuma which renewed the hostilities.

Men of the 8th Cavalry Regiment, from Fort Whipple, and men of the 14th Infantry Regiment, under William Redwood Price, responded by counter raiding into Hualapai territory. The soldiers fought several small battles with the natives and burned many of their rancherías. They also built posts, including Camp Date Creek, in January 1867, and Camp Hualapai, in May 1869. Camp Date Creek was located along Date Creek and the road between Prescott and La Paz. Camp Hualapai was located north of Prescott, southeast of Aztec Pass, along Walnut Creek and Captain Hardy's toll road. Both of the posts greatly improved the military's ability to defeat the natives but disease would conquer the Hualapai first. The war is generally recorded as having ended in December 1868 due to an outbreak of dysentery and whooping cough that caused many of the natives to surrender, however, Chief Leve Leve did not surrender until 1869 and Chief Sherum continued to lead his followers until 1870. Many of the Hualapais were moved to a reservation at Camp Beale's Spring but three years later moved to the Colorado River Reservation near La Paz. Some went to a temporary reservation at Camp Date Creek but by 1874 the post was closed. Conditions at the reservations led to starvation and disease so in 1875 some of the Hualapai escaped to their traditional lands, only to find that it had already been settled by others. The Hualapais then either went back to the reservation or took up work in mines or on ranches. In 1882, a 900,000 acre reservation was established for the Hualapai but it was described as poor land, either because of weather, or from the ranchers whose cattle destroyed many of the indigenous plants that were vital to the Hualapais' source of food. It is estimated that one-third of the Hualapai population was lost between 1865 and 1870.

== See also ==
- Apache Wars
- Yavapai Wars
- Navajo Wars
