= William Redwood Price =

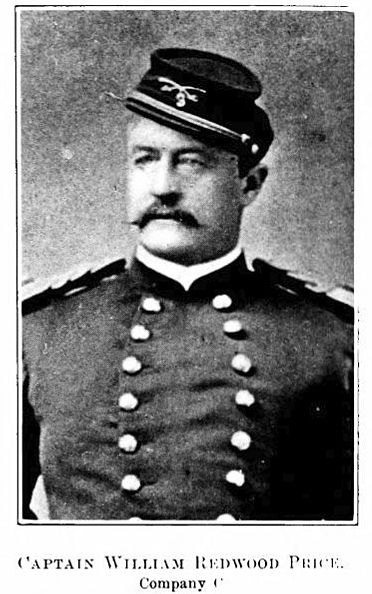
- Born: May 20, 1836; Cincinnati, Ohio, United States
- Died: December 30, 1881 (aged 45); Germantown, Philadelphia, Pennsylvania, United States
- Burial place: Laurel Hill Cemetery, Philadelphia, Pennsylvania
- Military career
- Allegiance: United States; Union
- Branch: United States Army; Union Army
- Service years: 1861 — 1874
- Rank: Lieutenant Colonel; Brevet Brigadier General
- Units: 3rd Pennsylvania Cavalry; 6th U.S. Cavalry Regiment
- Conflicts: American Civil War; Hualapai War

William Redwood Price (1836-1881) was an American military officer who participated in the American Civil War on the Union side and later in the Hualapai War.

== Biography ==
Price was born in Cincinnati on May 20, 1836, and entered military service when the American Civil War broke out by joining the Union Army as a captain in the 3rd Pennsylvania Cavalry. He was the Assistant Commissary of Musters of the staff of William W. Averell. Due to his skills in administration he was reassigned to Washington D.C. where he served as an Assistant Adjutant-General and then as Assistant Inspector-General in the Cavalry Bureau. He was brevetted Brigadier General on March 13, 1865. Staying in the army; he became Lieutenant Colonel of the 6th U.S. Cavalry Regiment. In 1867 Price organized a garrison of men from the 8th U.S. Cavalry Regiment and the 14th U.S. Infantry Regiment, stationed in Fort Whipple, to launch raids against the Hualapai during the Hualapai War. Price retired in 1874 and died on December 30, 1881, in Germantown, Philadelphia. He was buried at the Laurel Hill Cemetery.

== See also ==
- List of American Civil War brevet generals (Union)
