= Sylvester Mowry =

American pioneer, founder of Mowry, Arizona (1833–1871)

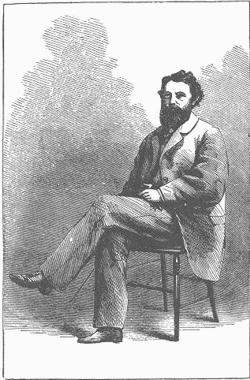
- An 1864 drawing of Sylvester Mowry by John R. Browne.
- Born: January 17, 1833; Providence, Rhode Island
- Died: October 17, 1871 (aged 38); London, England
- Military career
- Allegiance: United States
- Branch: United States Army
- Service years: 1852–1858
- Rank: First Lieutenant
- Nickname: Prince of the Desert
- Unit: 3rd Artillery Regiment
- Conflicts: Apache Wars
- Other work: Miner, author, politician

Sylvester Mowry (January 17, 1833 – October 17, 1871) was an American politician, miner, and land speculator. He is best remembered as an early advocate for establishing the Arizona Territory. He was also a West Point graduate and officer of the United States Army who was later arrested as a traitor during the American Civil War.

== Early years ==
Mowry was born January 17, 1833, in Providence, Rhode Island, the son of Charles C. Mowry and Celia E. (Aldrich) Mowry. As a child Mowry was described as big for his age and "inclined to be wild." He entered West Point in 1848 at 16 and graduated in 1852, finishing 16th out of 43 classmates. Well educated, he spoke Latin and later became the author of the 1863 book The Geography and Resources of Arizona and Sonora.

After graduation from the military academy, Lieutenant Mowry was sent to the West Coast and assigned to the Pacific Railroad Survey near the Columbia River, serving under Isaac Ingalls Stevens, the governor of Washington Territory and a fellow West Pointer. During the winter of 1854–55 he served under Lieutenant Colonel Edward Steptoe in Utah. Steptoe had been sent to investigate the massacre of John W. Gunnison and his survey party the previous year. While stationed there, Mowry seduced the married niece of Brigham Young. When Young learned of this, he was furious with Mowry and threatened his life. Steptoe hastily ordered Mowry to leave Utah and lead a detachment of soldiers southwest through the Great Basin to Fort Tejon, California, a difficult journey across 750 miles of desert and mountains.

== Arizona ==
In August 1855 he was stationed at Fort Yuma, a remote outpost on the California side of the Colorado River. While at Fort Yuma, Mowry became interested in the potential mining opportunities in the land acquired from Mexico as part of the Gadsden Purchase. In 1856 a convention was held in Tucson to draft a petition asking Congress to separate Arizona from New Mexico to create a new territory. At that time, Arizona was defined as all the land stretching along the Mexican border between California and Texas below the 34th parallel. Mowry became an enthusiastic proponent of this initiative.

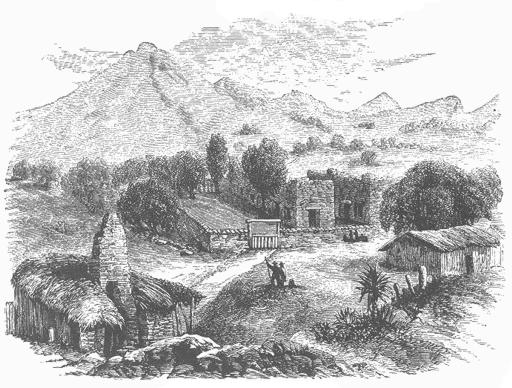
Mowry Mines, Arizona by John R. Browne.

In 1856, Mowry was elected as a delegate to advocate before Congress for the creation of the Arizona Territory. The Army granted him leave but Congress refused to recognize him when he arrived in Washington in May 1857. Nevertheless, Mowry worked unofficially with Congress members and appealed to the public, writing articles for publication and making speeches to support creating an Arizona Territory. In 1857 he printed a pamphlet titled Memoir on the Proposed Territory of Arizona; it was the first publication dealing solely with Arizona.

He was successfully re-elected to the position of delegate in late 1857 but Congress again failed to recognize him. Mowry eventually resigned his Army commission on July 31, 1858, and continued to push for recognition of an Arizona Territory. Returning to Arizona in September 1858, he was re-elected by a nearly unanimous vote to serve a third term as a delegate to Congress In 1859 he published the first edition of Arizona and Sonora, describing the "geography, history and resources" of the region. His third and final edition, published in 1864 was significantly expanded in length.

After leaving the Army Mowry traveled regularly between the East Coast and Arizona, involving himself in politics and mining deals. While in Tubac on July 8, 1859, he fought a duel with Edward E. Cross, an editor for the Weekly Arizonian who had questioned the viability of an Arizona state and called the territory worthless. The men were armed with rifles and allowed four shots each. Cross fired his four shots to no effect and Mowry spent three shots but declined to use his final shot. So the duel ended without bloodshed and the two apologized to each other. Mowry subsequently purchased the Arizonian newspaper and relocated it to Tucson where it became a voice for the Democrats in the region.

In 1860 Mowry resigned his position as delegate and accepted an appointment to serve as a Commissioner for the United States to establish an eastern boundary for California. A year later he was removed from the position. During his time as commissioner, Mowry began looking for an opportunity to purchase a silver mine. With the backing of wealthy investors from Rhode Island, Mowry pursued various opportunities until April 1860 when he successfully acquired the Patagonia silver and lead mine just southeast of the Santa Rita Mountains in southern Arizona. After renaming it the Mowry Mines, he and his brother Charles Mowry began constructing a mill and a smelter for extracting metal from the ore.

== Civil War ==
In early 1861 Mowry was crisscrossing the Territory, holding meetings to promote the Confederate cause. Though a northerner from the reliably pro-Union and anti-slavery state of Rhode Island, Mowry was a supporter of both secession and slavery. This attitude was not uncommon in the territory at the time and Mowry may also have been influenced by family members who owned a plantation in South Carolina. In July 1861, soon after the start of the Civil War, American forts in southern Arizona were evacuated as Union troops redeployed to fight the Confederates. Without protection from hostile Indians in the region, many miners abandoned their mines and fled for their safety. Mowry remained however, erecting a stockade in hopes of protecting his mine. He also wrote to government officials pleading for protection from the Apaches and when no help was forthcoming he wrote to Confederate officers with no better results. In desperation he wrote:

There is only one way to wage war against the Apaches. A steady, persistent campaign must be made, following them to their haunts—hunting them to the fastnesses of the mountains. They must be surrounded, starved into coming in, surprised or inveigled—by white flags, or any other method, human or divine—and then put to death. If these ideas shock any weak-minded individual who thinks himself a philanthropist, I can only say that I pity without respecting his mistaken sympathy. A man might as well have sympathy for a rattlesnake or a tiger.

Meanwhile, a secessionist convention was held in Arizona to establish the Confederate Arizona Territory. Mowry was a firm supporter of the new territory, as were many others in Arizona. After several battles between Union and Confederate forces, the California Column began their advance across Confederate Arizona in 1862 from Fort Yuma. Led by General James H. Carleton the Union captured Tucson on May 20, 1862, effectively putting the territory back in Union hands. In an effort to maintain control, Carleton ordered the arrest of several Confederate sympathizers who had remained after the Confederate retreat. On June 13, 1862, Lieutenant Edward Banker Willis proceeded to arrest Mowry at his mine. He was accused of treason for selling ammunition to rebel forces and sharing military information in letters to various Confederate officials including Jefferson Davis, Brigadier General Henry Hopkins Sibley and Captain Sherod Hunter.

Mowry was detained at Fort Yuma while his case was considered by a military commission. The mine was put under receivership and continued operations on behalf of Mowry. Contrary to some of his later assertions, the Army did not confiscate Mowry's mine at this time. By the end of the summer, Confederate forces had retreated to Texas and most of those arrested by Carleton were released on the grounds that they could no longer do any harm. Likewise, Mowry's case was reviewed by a Board of Officers and Mowry was released from custody on November 8, 1862.

After release, Mowry returned to his mine to find it had been shut down because the operator lacked sufficient funds to pay wages. For the remainder of the war, Mowry traveled between Arizona, San Francisco and New York in a tangled effort to run the mine, raise capital from investors, and seek redress from the government for perceived wrongs. Many of Mowry's statements were contradictory, telling potential investors that the mine was still a lucrative ongoing venture but then complaining that government intervention had cost him dearly. In particular, Mowry was bitterly angry with Carleton, claiming that his arrest was result of a grudge that the general held against him for some past incident. Carleton denied any such grudge and it is unlikely that they had ever met prior to Mowry's arrest in Arizona.

None of his lawsuits or government petitions ever came to fruition. Finally in November 1864 Mowry sold his mine to a group of San Francisco investors and returned to Arizona to operate it on their behalf.

== Later career ==
After leaving Arizona Mowry spent most of his time in New York City where he was involved in various speculative deals in the mining industry. He enjoyed the prosperous lifestyle of a successful businessman. At some point he became involved with Lillie Hitchcock the daughter of a wealthy doctor in San Francisco. When the doctor learned of Mowry's intent to marry, he forced her to break off their relationship. By the end of the year Lillie went on to marry B.H.Coit and when she died a bequest she left to San Francisco was used by the city to build Coit Tower.

In 1870 Mowry returned to Arizona to run again for the position of territorial delegate. When his candidacy failed to gain support, he convinced Peter R. Brady to run in his place. After a bitter campaign Brady's opponent won handily with two-thirds of the vote. Brady blamed Mowry for his defeat, saying that Mowry was a "heavy load" whose "support was a positive damage."

In June 1871 Mowry became seriously ill while in Washington DC. In September, when he had recovered sufficiently to travel, Mowry went to London to consult a specialist. Shortly after his arrival, his health deteriorated and he became bedridden. An old friend, Charles D. Poston was in London at the time and stayed at his side until his death on October 17, 1871. The cause of death was reported as Bright's disease.

== Legacy ==
Mowry was a controversial figure. During his lifetime he was most recognized for his work as a territorial delegate, bringing national attention to the promise and challenges in the Arizona region. However, public opinion had soured on him by 1870 when one Arizona newspaper commented, "He quit the Territory having sustained his reputation as an egotist, braggart and shameless liar." Obituaries written shortly after his death noted his contributions to Arizona but also criticized him for his failure to support the Union during the Civil War. His most enduring legacy is the village that grew up around his silver mine after his death. It was abandoned in the 1930s but the ghost town still bears his name.

== See also ==
- Charles D. Poston
