= Charles Symmonds =

United States Army general (1866–1941)

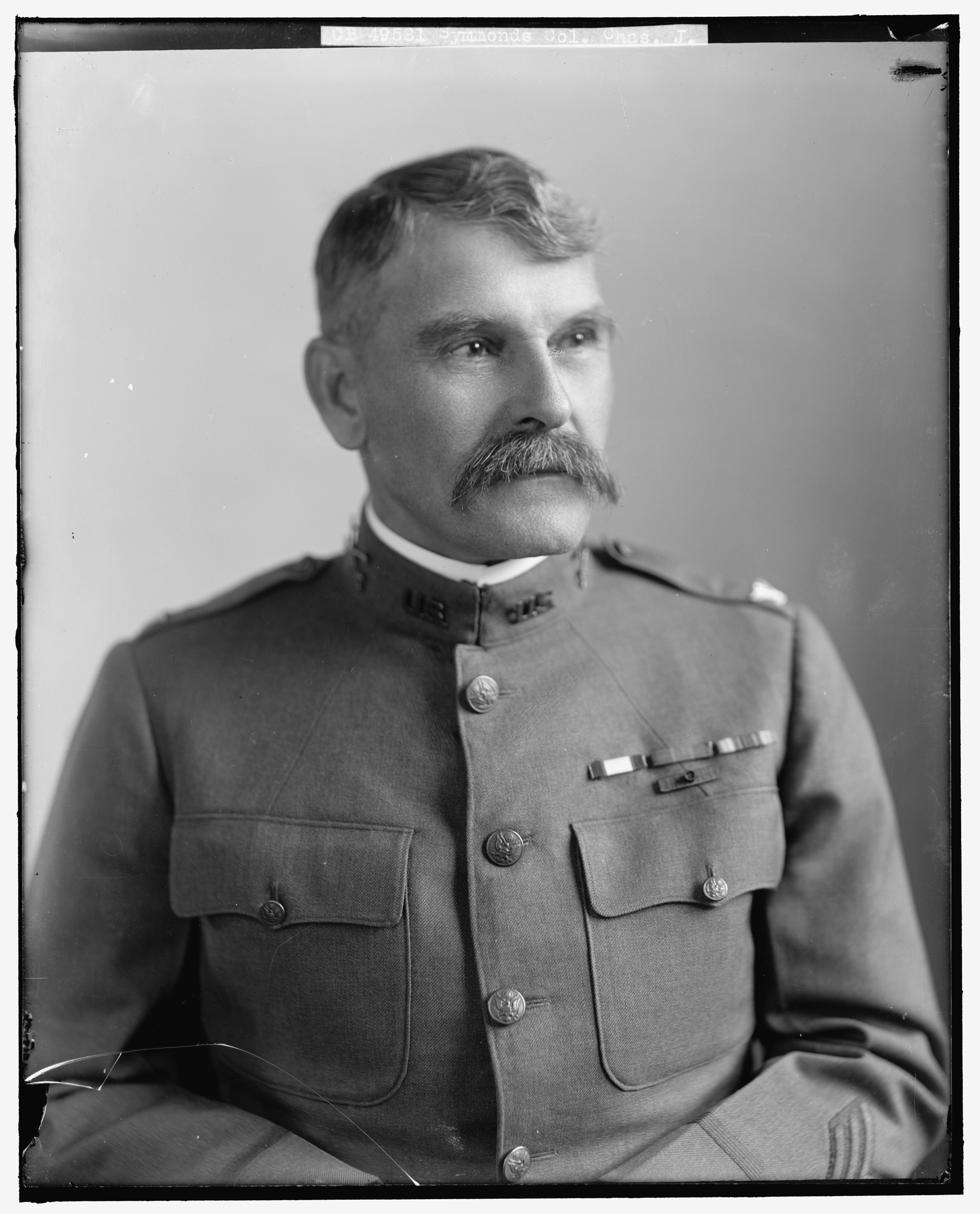
- Born: Charles Jacobs Symmonds; October 6, 1866; Holland, Michigan
- Died: July 16, 1941 (aged 74); Chevy Chase, Maryland
- Burial place: Arlington National Cemetery
- Education: United States Military Academy
- Military career
- Allegiance: United States
- Branch: United States Army
- Service years: 1890–1930, 1931
- Rank: Brigadier General
- Commands: 1st Cavalry Division; U.S. Army Cavalry School; 2nd Brigade, 1st Cavalry Division; 7th Cavalry Regiment; General Intermediate Storage Depot, Gièvres; Big Bend District, Texas
- Conflicts: Spanish–American War; World War I
- Awards: Distinguished Service Medal

Charles J. Symmonds (October 6, 1866 – July 16, 1941) was a brigadier general in the United States Army. He served during the Spanish–American War and World War I, and was awarded the Army Distinguished Service Medal.

His award citation reads:

The President of the United States of America, authorized by Act of Congress, July 9, 1918, takes pleasure in presenting the Army Distinguished Service Medal to Colonel (Cavalry) Charles Jacobs Symmonds, United States Army, for exceptionally meritorious and distinguished services to the Government of the United States, in a duty of great responsibility during World War I. Colonel Symmonds Commanded for many months the important Intermediate Storage Depot at Gievres. He successfully administered a large personnel and supervised the growth of Gievres as a storage depot. He organized the system of supply from that station so efficiently that there were not shortages, either for food or material, at the regulating stations dependent upon Gievres for supply during all the active operations.

== Biography ==
Symmonds was born in Holland, Michigan in 1866 and appointed to the United States Military Academy from Wisconsin in 1886. His official residence was listed as Kenosha, Wisconsin. He graduated from the United States Military Academy in June 1890 and was commissioned as an infantry officer. Transferred to the cavalry in March 1891, Symmonds was assigned to the 7th Cavalry Regiment.

Serving in the Arizona Territory from May 1895 to September 1898, Symmonds did not participate in combat during the Spanish–American War. After receiving quartermaster training in Huntsville, Alabama until November 1898, he was deployed to Puerto Principe, Cuba until November 1899. Symmonds contracted yellow fever there in August 1899. After an assignment in Washington, D.C. until January 1900, he returned to Cuba until August 1901.

Promoted to captain and reassigned to the 12th Cavalry Regiment, Symmonds served in Texas until April 1903. He was then sent to the University of Maine as a professor of military science and tactics until September 1906. After various assignments with the 12th Cavalry and promotion to major, Symmonds was transferred back to the 7th Cavalry in August 1914 and deployed to the Philippines until November 1916. Promoted to lieutenant colonel and reassigned to the 6th Cavalry Regiment, he served as commander of the Big Bend District at Marfa, Texas from February to October 1917.

Symmonds received a temporary promotion to colonel in August 1917 and was deployed to France in February 1918, where he served as commander of the General Intermediate Storage Depot at Gièvres until July 1919. He was awarded the Army Distinguished Service Medal in March 1919 and made an officer of the Legion of Honour by Marshal Philippe Pétain in April 1919. His promotion to colonel was made permanent in July 1919.

After the war, Symmonds held various staff positions and also served as commander of the 7th Cavalry Regiment at Fort Bliss, Texas from April to December 1920. He was promoted to brigadier general in November 1923. Symmonds was assigned to Camp Stotsenburg in the Philippines from March 1924 to June 1926. He commanded the 2nd Brigade, 1st Cavalry Division at Fort Bliss from August 1926 to May 1927. Symmonds was then commandant of the U.S. Army Cavalry School at Fort Riley, Kansas for two years until September 1929. His next assignment was back at Fort Bliss commanding the 1st Cavalry Division from September 1929 to October 1930. On October 31, 1930, he retired from active duty, having reached the mandatory retirement age of sixty-four.

In June 1928, Symmonds applied for a patent on folding or stowable tables. In May 1931, he was briefly recalled to active duty at the Jeffersonville Depot in Indiana where they were manufacturing tables according to his design. Symmonds was eventually awarded eight United States patents between September 1931 and September 1940.

Symmonds died at his home in Chevy Chase, Maryland. He is buried at Arlington National Cemetery.

== Family ==
Symmonds was married to George Crook Thomas (1875–1959), the daughter of Brigadier General Earl Dennison Thomas. They were the parents of two children, Captain Robert Earl Symmonds (1894–1918) and Phillis Symmonds Riggs (1910–1994).
