= Edward Banker Willis =

- Born: January 9, 1831; New York City
- Died: December 7, 1879 (48); Fontenelle, Iowa
- Military career
- Allegiance: United States of America
- Branch: United States Army
- Service years: 1861 – 1866
- Rank: Lieutenant Colonel
- Conflicts: American Civil War: Capture of Tucson; Navajo Wars Apache Wars
- Other work: Civil engineer

Edward Banker Willis (January 9, 1831 – December 7, 1879) was a United States military officer during the American Civil War. He participated in the Trans-Mississippi Theater, fighting rebels and hostile native Americans in the frontier of Arizona and New Mexico.

== Biography ==
Willis was born on January 9, 1831, in New York City and when he was nineteen he traveled west for the California Gold Rush. On August 24, 1861, he mustered into the service of the Union Army, becoming a first lieutenant and later a captain of Company A, 1st California Infantry. From San Diego, Willis marched with James H. Carleton's expedition across New Mexico Territory and was involved in the capture of Tucson, an old Spanish presidio defended by a handful of militia. After that he headed south for the mining town of Mowry in order to arrest a suspected traitor named Sylvester Mowry. For his conduct in the Civil War, Willis was promoted to major on May 5, 1863. In September, Willis led a scouting party against the Navajo and later was on the board to determine where to build Fort Whipple. Leaving Fort Wingate on November 7, 1863, he went to Little Chino Valley, north of Prescott, and opened the new fort on December 23. However, the fort was moved on May 11, 1864, to its present location near Prescott. On June 30, 1864, Willis fought a small engagement with Apaches along the Salt River. On September 5, he mustered out of the 1st California Infantry and joined up with the 1st New Mexico Infantry at Santa Fe, becoming a lieutenant colonel on February 5, 1865. In January 1866 Willis was in command of Fort Selden when he heard a rumor that a large band of Apaches had sacked the Janos presidio in Chihuahua. Hastily he organized an expedition of fifty infantrymen and twenty-five cavalrymen to march to the aid of the Mexican citizens there. But when the column arrived, ten days later, Willis learned that the citizens had successfully fought the Apaches for two days. The rest fled into the surrounding mountains. Willis was honorably discharged at Santa Fe on November 1, 1866. He then became a civil engineer in New Mexico, Arizona California, Oregon, Washington and Oklahoma Territory before retiring to Omaha, Nebraska. Willis died at Fontenelle, Iowa on December 7, 1879, leaving a wife but no children.
