= Robert Alexander (United States Army officer) =

United States Army general (1863–1941)

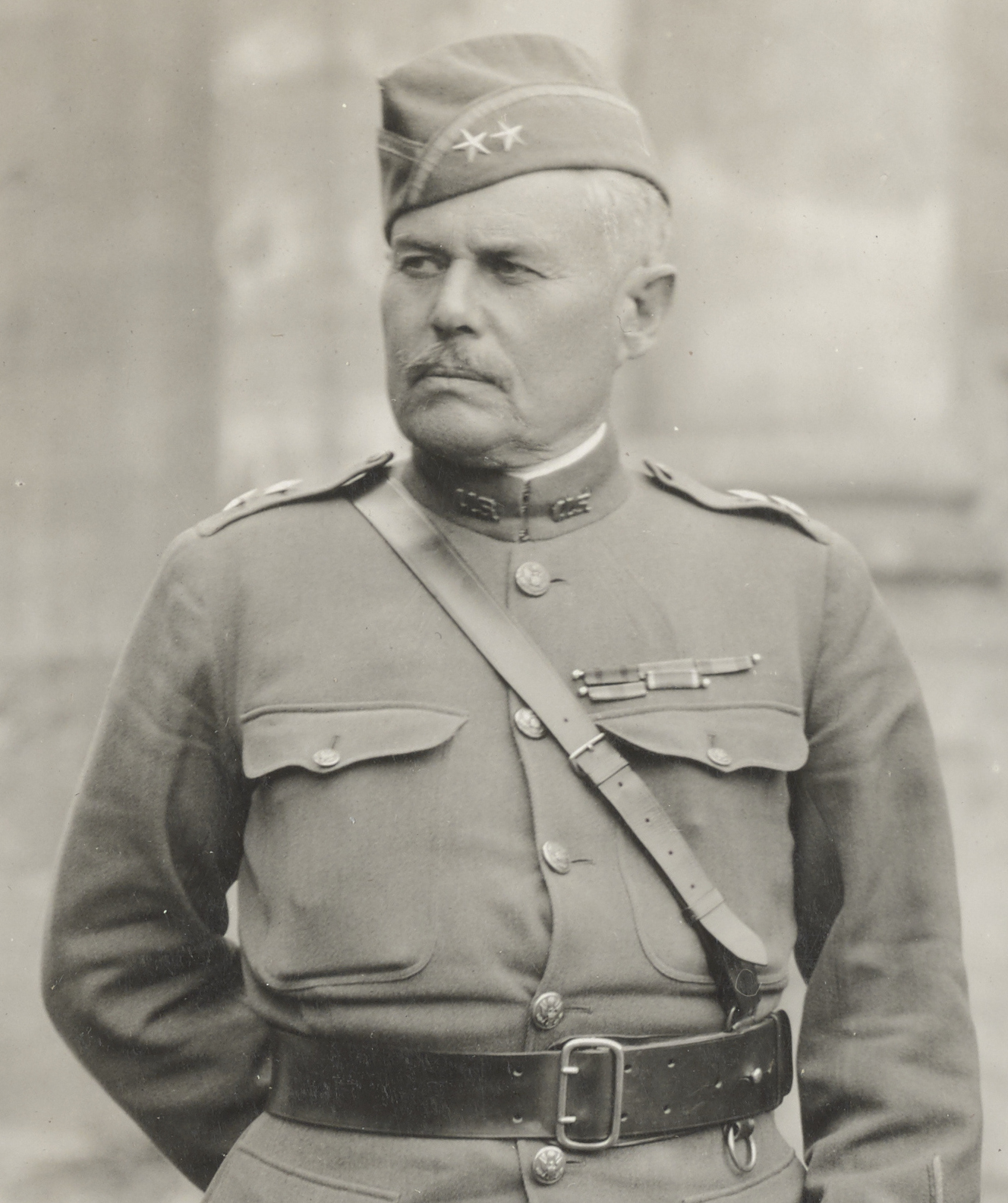
- Robert Alexander, wearing the two stars of a major general, pictured here in 1918.
- Born: October 17, 1863; Baltimore, Maryland, U.S.
- Died: August 25, 1941 (aged 77); The Bronx, New York, U.S.
- Burial place: Arlington National Cemetery, U.S.
- Spouse: Mollie Augur Alexander (nee Thomas)
- Military career
- Allegiance: United States
- Branch: United States Army
- Service years: 1886–1927
- Rank: Major General
- Service number: 0-282
- Unit: Infantry Branch
- Commands: 41st Division; 63rd Brigade; 77th Division; 3rd Field Artillery Brigade; 3rd Division; Fort Lewis, Washington
- Conflicts: American Indian Wars; Spanish–American War; Philippine–American War; Pancho Villa Expedition; World War I
- Awards: Distinguished Service Cross, Croix de Guerre

Major General Robert Alexander (October 17, 1863 – August 25, 1941) was a senior United States Army officer. He served in World War I, where he commanded the 77th Infantry Division, in which the famous Lost Battalion served, on the Western Front in 1918.

== Early life ==
Robert Alexander was born in Baltimore, Maryland, on October 17, 1863. His parents were Judge and Mrs. William Alexander. His father had been Justice of the Circuit Court of Baltimore City and the Court of Appeals of the State of Maryland.

Alexander studied law in the offices of J. B. and Edwin H. Brown in Centreville, Maryland. He attained admission to the bar, but decided against a legal career, instead enlisting in the United States Army's 4th Infantry Regiment as a private on April 7, 1886.

== Military career ==
In 1887, he became the first sergeant of his company, and in 1889 received a promotion to second lieutenant.

As he rose through the ranks he took part in the American Indian Wars, served in Puerto Rico during the Spanish–American War. He was with the 11th Infantry in 1901 when it was ordered to the Philippines during the Philippine–American War, and he served at Carigara on the island of Leyte. In 1902, he took part in combat against Filipino insurgents on Leyte and Samar, and in one engagement he was wounded by a bolo. During the Pancho Villa Expedition, Alexander served on the Texas–Mexico border. He was a distinguished graduate of the Army School of the Line in 1909 and graduated from the Army Staff College in 1910.

When the United States joined the Allied forces in World War I, Alexander proved his valor and was able to rise through the ranks. He was also given the responsibility of inspector general in the Zone of Communications from November 1917 to February 1918. Alexander was promoted to brigadier general in February 1918 and then to major general in August 1918.

From the headquarters of the 77th Division in France, Alexander was one of the officers who reported on the Lost Battalion incident. A group of around 500 soldiers, in nine companies, had disappeared after going into the Argonne Forest expecting American and French Allied troops to meet them. This had followed an American attack on German forces and, with Major Charles White Whittlesey leading the group, the men found that the French troops had been stalled. As a result, the battalion was cut off by the Germans who surprised them and suffered large losses with only 197 men coming out of the ravine. In the report he states:

"General Order Number 30:

I desire to publish to the command an official recognition of the valor and extraordinary heroism in action of the officers and enlisted men of the following organizations: Companies A, B, C, E, G, H 308th Infantry Company K 307th Infantry Companies C, D 306th Machine Gun Btln. These organizations, or detachments therefrom, comprised the approximate force of 550 men under command of Major Charles W. Whittlesey, which was cut off from the remainder of the Seventy-Seventh Division and surrounded by a superior number of the enemy near Charlevaux, in the Forest d'Argonne, from the morning of October 3, 1918, to the night of October 7, 1918. Without food for more than one hundred hours, harassed continuously by machine gun, rifle, trench mortar and grenade fire, Major Whittlesey's command, with undaunted spirit and magnificent courage, successfully met and repulsed daily violent attacks by the enemy. They held the position which had been reached by supreme efforts, under orders received for an advance, until communication was re-established with friendly troops. When relief finally came, approximately 194 officers and men were able to walk out of the position. Officers and men killed numbered 107. On the fourth day a written proposition to surrender received from the Germans was treated with the contempt which it deserved. The officers and men of these organizations during these five days of isolation continually gave unquestionable proof of extraordinary heroism and demonstrated the high standard and ideals of the United States Army.

Robert Alexander, Major General, US Army Commanding"

April 15, 1919

In France, he commanded the 41st Division, 63rd Infantry Brigade, and the 77th Division. He commanded the 77th from August 1918 onwards, including during the Meuse–Argonne offensive, where he was awarded the Distinguished Service Cross (DSC) in October for heroism at Grandpré, Ardennes. The medal's citation reads:

The President of the United States of America, authorized by Act of Congress, July 9, 1918, takes pleasure in presenting the Distinguished Service Cross to Major General Robert Alexander, United States Army, for extraordinary heroism in action while serving with 77th Division, A.E.F., near Grand Pre, France, 11 October 1918. During the advance in the Argonne Forest and at a time when his forces were fatigued by the stress of battle and a long period of active front-line service, Major General Alexander visited the units in the front line, cheering and encouraging them to greater efforts. Unmindful of the severe fire to which he was subjected, he continued until he had inspected each group. His utter disregard of danger and inspiring example resulted in the crossing of the Aire and the capture of Grand Pre and St. Juvin.

He was also awarded the Croix de Guerre (France), two citations and was made a Commander of the Legion of Honor (France).

After the war, which ended on November 11, 1918, he returned to his permanent rank of colonel and commanded the 3rd Field Artillery Brigade.

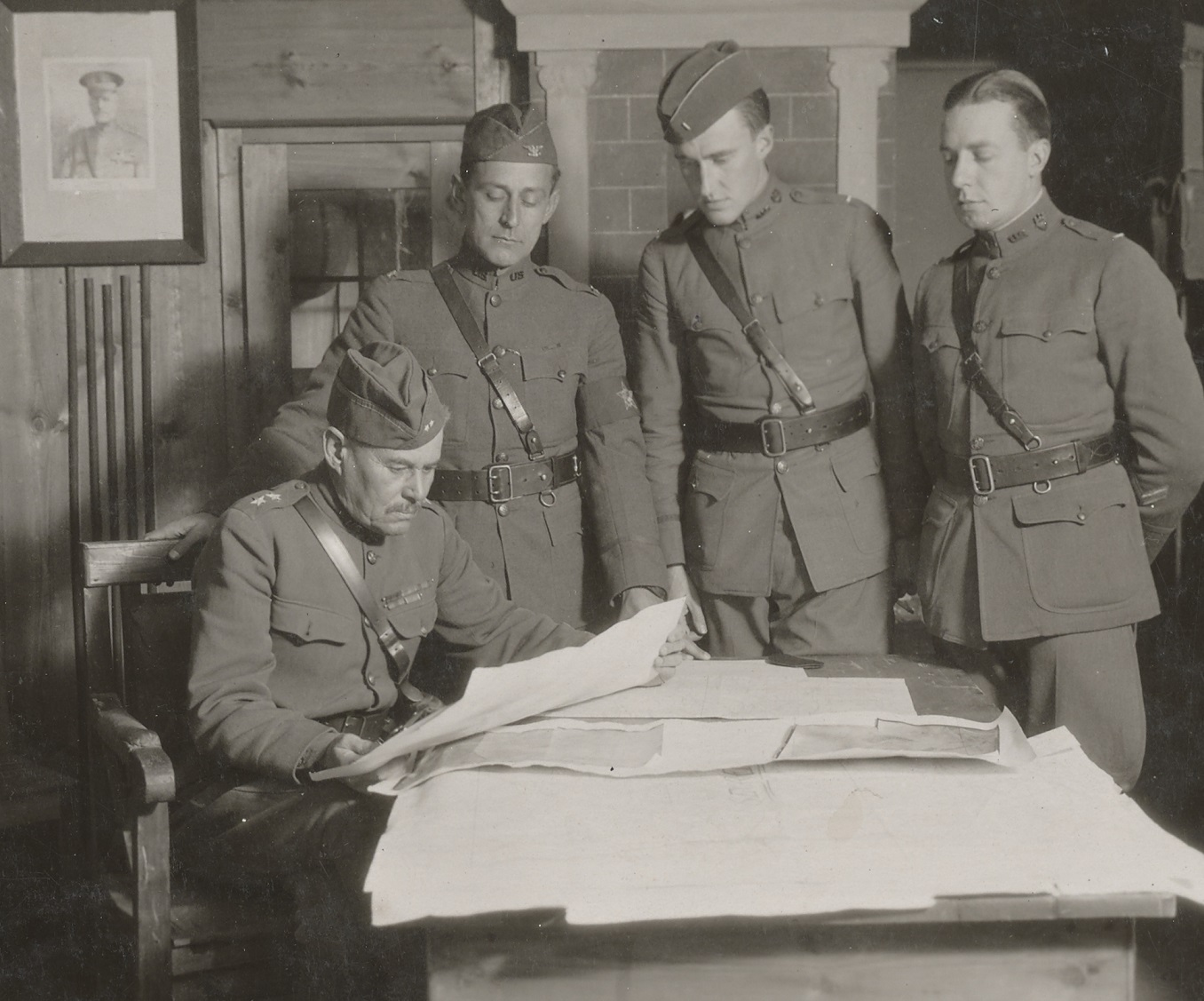
Major General Robert Alexander studying reconnaissance data with his aides near Varennes-en-Argonne in October 1918.

In 1919, Alexander received the honorary degree of LL.D. from St. John's College of Annapolis, Maryland.

Alexander later commanded the 3rd Division and Fort Lewis, Washington. He retired in 1927 at the rank of major general.

He authored a memoir, 1931's Memories of the World War, 1917–1918. Also in 1931, Alexander received an honorary LL.D. from the College of Puget Sound.

In 1933, Alexander was a delegate to the Washington state convention that ratified the Twenty-first Amendment to the United States Constitution. He was a candidate for chairman of the convention but after a deadlock he withdrew in favor of a compromise choice. On the ratification question, Alexander was in the majority, which voted to enact the Twenty-first amendment by a vote of 94 to 4.

== Personal life ==
In 1892, Alexander married Mollie Augur Thomas (1871–1953), the daughter of Brigadier General Earl D. Thomas. They were the parents of two sons, both of whom served in the army. William Dennison (1893–1978) attained the rank of colonel and Robert Jr. became a lieutenant colonel.

Alexander was active in freemasonry. In 1931, he attained the 33rd degree of the Scottish Rite.

He died at the Veterans Administration Hospital in The Bronx on August 25, 1941, and is buried at Arlington National Cemetery, in Arlington, Virginia.

== Effective dates of promotion ==
The dates and ranks of Alexander's promotions were:

- Private and Sergeant, Company G, 4th United States Infantry, April 7, 1886 – January 29, 1890
- Second Lieutenant, December 17, 1889
- First Lieutenant, January 7, 1897
- Captain, October 2, 1899
- Major, March 11, 1911
- Lieutenant Colonel, July 1, 1916
- Colonel, August 26, 1917
- Brigadier General (temporary), February 9, 1918
- Major General (temporary), August 26, 1918
- Colonel, July 31, 1919
- Brigadier General (permanent), April 30, 1921
- Major General (permanent), August 26, 1927
- Major General (retired), October 17, 1927

== Bibliography ==
- Davis, Henry Blaine Jr. (1998). Generals in Khaki. Raleigh, NC: Pentland Press. ISBN 1571970886. OCLC 40298151.
- Zabecki, David T.; Mastriano, Douglas V., eds. (2020). Pershing's Lieutenants: American Military Leadership in World War I. New York, NY: Osprey Publishing. ISBN 978-1-4728-3863-6.

Military offices
Preceded by Edward Vollrath	Commanding General 41st Division; February–August 1918	Succeeded by Richard Coulter Jr.
Preceded by Evan M. Johnson	Commanding General 77th Division; 1918–1919	Succeeded by Post deactivated
