= Fort Date Creek =

Historic place in Yavapai County, Arizona

- Yavapai County, Arizona
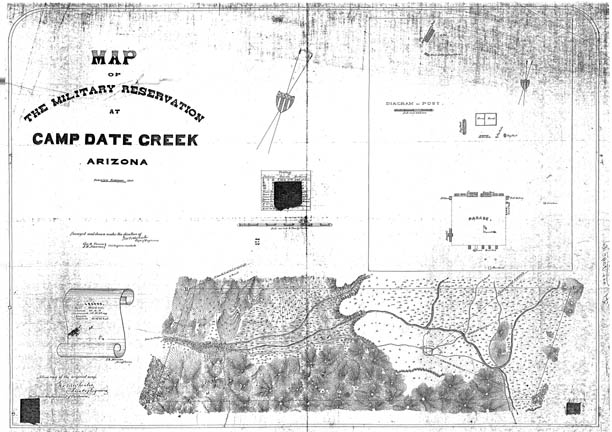
- An 1869 map of Camp Date Creek and the adjoining Hualapai reservation.

Site information
- Type: Army post
- Controlled by: Arizona

Location
- Coordinates: 34.2641906°N 112.9251849°W

Site history
- Built: 1867
- Built by: United States
- In use: 1867 - 1874
- Battles/wars: Hualapai War

Garrison information
- Occupants: United States Army

- Camp Date Creek
- U.S. National Register of Historic Places
- Location within Arizona Location within the United States
- Location: near Hillside, Arizona
- Coordinates: 34.2641906°N 112.9251849°W
- Built: 1867
- Architectural style: Adobe
- NRHP reference No.: 95001361
- Added to NRHP: March 22, 1996

Fort Date Creek, also known as Camp McPherson or Camp Date Creek, was a United States Army post established in 1867 sixty miles south of Prescott, Arizona. It was built to safeguard American settlers in Yavapai County.

== History ==
Fort Date Creek is located along Date Creek near the OX Ranch and was originally named Camp McPherson for General James B. McPherson at its founding on January 23, 1867. The fort was initially a temporary base protecting the road from La Paz to Prescott during the Hualapai War. Just after being founded, it was abandoned for a new post named Camp Skull Valley, twenty-five miles to the north in March 1867. On May 11, 1867, the fort was reopened and renamed Camp Date Creek and later Fort Date Creek. The fort itself was moved a short distance twice, but always remained along the creek. In 1868 the garrison included two infantry companies from the 14th Regiment and beginning in 1869, the area became an important center for fighting hostile native Americans. A temporary reservation was established at the fort in 1869 for the Hualapai people but by 1874 the United States Secretary of War declared that it was no longer needed for military purposes. Fort Date Creek then became a settlement for American pioneers for several years. As of today a few adobe buildings and a cemetery mark its location.
