= Aztec Pass =

Gap in Yavapai County, Arizona, US

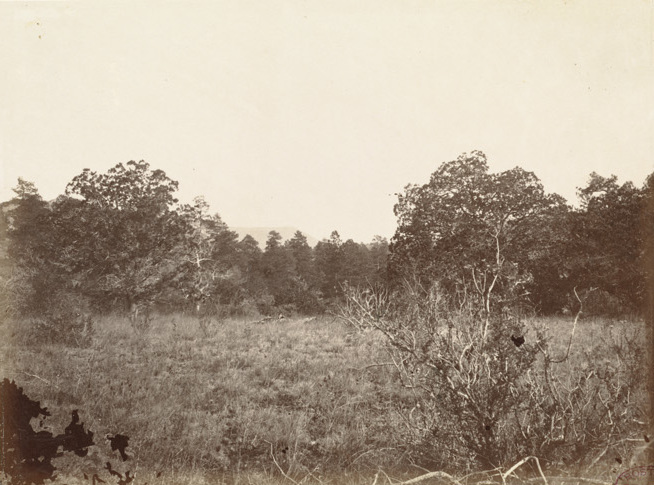
- "Aztec Pass," Western Arizona, 1,330 miles from Missouri River, c. 1867–1868. Boston Public Library

- Location within Arizona
- Elevation: 6,232 feet (1,900 m)

Third Approach
- Location: Yavapai County, Arizona, United States
- Range: Juniper Mountains and Santa Maria Mountains
- Coordinates: 34°56′12″N 112°58′12″W

Aztec Pass is a gap and a valley between the Juniper Mountains and Santa Maria Mountains in Yavapai County, Arizona, United States. The summit of the pass is at an elevation of 6,232 feet, at 34°56′12″N 112°58′12″W, the divide between Muddy Wash on the west and Walnut Creek on the east. The eastern entrance to the pass is at the mouth of the valley of Walnut Creek where it emerges from the hills on the west side of Chino Valley at 34°58′54″N 112°38′04″W at an elevation of 4,583 feet / 1,397 meters. The western entrance to the pass is at the top of the valley of Muddy Wash at the foot of the Juniper Mountains, located at 34°58′30″N 113°02′03″W.

== History ==
Aztec Pass was the route of the wagon toll road, known as the Hardyville - Prescott Road, built by William Harrison Hardy in 1864, from his steamboat landing at Hardyville to new Arizona territorial capital of Prescott, through the Juniper and Santa Maria Mountains. The western entrance was the location of a campground known as Oaks and Willows on Muddy Wash. The eastern entrance of the road into the pass was the location of the Old Toll Gate 6 miles east of the summit. The toll gate was moved 3 miles eastward after Hardy improved the route through the pass. Camp Hualpai at 34°55′49″N 112°50′27″W was built near that second tollgate along Walnut Creek where the road entered the pass from the south from Williamson Valley.
