= Fort Whipple, Arizona =

Former US Army installation in Yavapai County, Arizona

Fort Whipple
- Prescott, Arizona
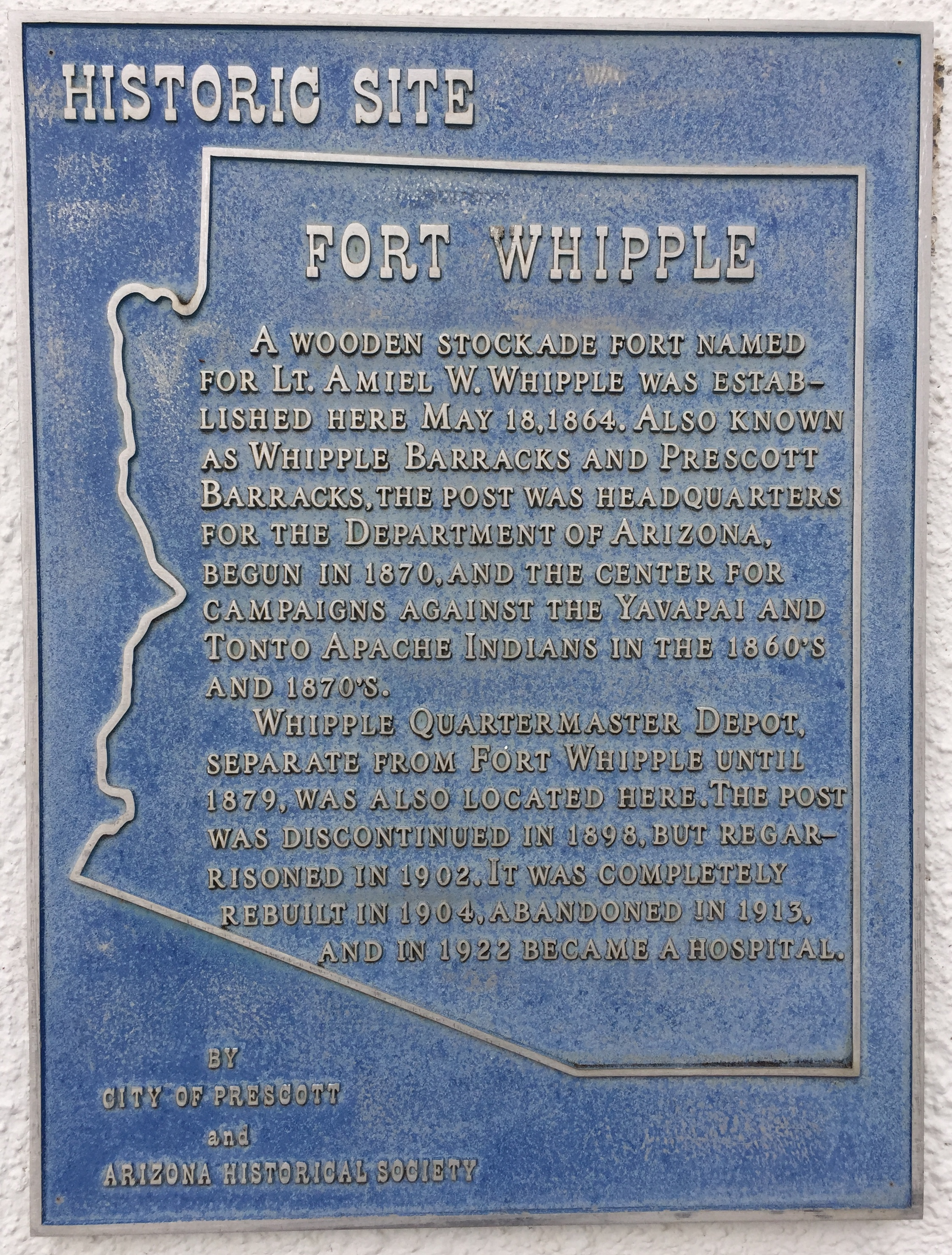
- Fort Whipple historic plaque located on the grounds of the VA Hospital in Prescott, Arizona

Site information
- Type: Army fortification
- Controlled by: Arizona
- Condition: Medical treatment facility

Location
- Location within Arizona Location within the United States
- Coordinates: 34°33′17″N 112°27′10″W

Site history
- Built: 1863
- Built by: United States
- In use: 1863–1913

Garrison information
- Occupants: United States Army

Fort Whipple is a former United States (U.S.) Army post that was temporarily established at Del Rio Springs, north of present-day Chino Valley, Arizona, and later relocated to a permanent site near present-day Prescott, Arizona.

== History ==
The initial location of the post was established by Major Edward Banker Willis and Captain Nathaniel J. Pishon on December 23, 1863. They led Companies C and F of the First California Volunteers and set up the post under General Order #27 issued by General James Henry Carleton. Only tents and huts were in place, no permanent buildings were constructed at the Del Rio Springs site. The post was named Fort Whipple, after Amiel Weeks Whipple, an American military officer and topographical engineer. He served as a brigadier general in the American Civil War, and was mortally wounded on May 7, 1863, at the Battle of Chancellorsville in Virginia.

The Whipple Expedition led by Lieutenant A.W. Whipple between 1853 and 1854 was to survey a transcontinental railroad route along the 35th parallel north from Fort Smith, Arkansas to Los Angeles, California. Along the expedition's route, Whipple spotted the fields of gamma grass in the Del Rio Springs area and called the region "Val de China".

The Governor's Party arrived at Fort Whipple on January 22, 1864. Consisting of most of the officials of the new territorial government of Arizona, Governor John Noble Goodwin used the fort as the temporary government headquarters while he visited the territory to determine a permanent location for the fort and territorial capital.

In mid-May 1864, Major Willis under instructions from Colonel Nelson H. Davis, selected and implemented the relocation of the fort twenty-one miles south, near a miner's tent settlement on the east bank of Granite Creek. This permanent location for the fort was recommended by Governor Goodwin. Its placement was on higher ground, had better access to lumber, and the military could better protect the miners and pioneers in the Bradshaw Mountains area. The fort was a large rectangular pine-log stockade. At the same time, Whipple Depot was established as part of the fort. In late May, Prescott (approximately 1½ miles west of the fort) was designated as the permanent capital of the Arizona Territory. The town was named after William H. Prescott, historian. The town's name was suggested by then Secretary Richard Cunningham McCormick of the Arizona Territory, whom had read Hickling's books.

In setting up the territorial government, Goodwin's administration oversaw the first election of members to the 1st Arizona Territorial Legislature in July 1864. In September 1864, they met in Prescott and adopted the Howell Code, which was the first set of statutory laws to govern the territory. The legislature also enacted legislation establishing the Arizona Historical Society, creation of mail routes, and establishing a public education system, which included a public university (the University of Arizona). The legislature's meeting in Prescott made it the de facto capital of the territory.

The old site at Del Rio Springs continued to be used by scouting parties and was called Camp Clark, in honor of John A. Clark, Surveyor General of the New Mexico Territory. The camp site was later sold, becoming Postle's Ranch.

Fort Whipple served as a tactical base for detachments of several regiments involved in the American Indian Wars between 1864 and 1886. Fort Whipple became headquarters of the Military Department of Arizona from 1870 to 1886 when Colonel George Crook was assigned to Fort Whipple. He was responsible for having a new fort built to replace the decrepit palisade fort. Between 1869 and 1872, the old fort stockade was razed and the majority of new construction occurred up until 1877.

Whipple Depot was destroyed by fire in April 1872 and rebuilt by July 1872. In 1878, Whipple Depot was renamed Prescott Barracks. In May 1879, under General Orders #53, Prescott Barracks and Fort Whipple were consolidated to become Whipple Barracks.

From May 1885 to July 1886, Fort Whipple was home to Colonel Benjamin Grierson and Troop B of the 10th Cavalry Regiment (United States), also known as Buffalo Soldiers. By 1895, the fort was dilapidated and in 1897 was scheduled for deactivation.

In April 1898 when the United States declared war on Spain, the U.S. Army reopened Whipple Barracks as a point of muster for Arizona volunteers. 200 volunteers were recruited and called the “Arizona Cowboy Regiment”. They departed on May 4, 1898, to assemble in San Antonio, Texas. Officially called the 1st U.S. Volunteer Cavalry, they were nicknamed the “Rough Riders” and fought in Cuba.

Whipple Barracks was inactive between 1899 and 1902, and then reactivated in April 1902 to house and medically treat troops returning from the Spanish–American War and Philippine–American War. New barracks, buildings and quarters were constructed between 1903 and 1908. Four companies (about 500 soldiers' total) moved in.

The Prescott and Mount Union Railway operated an electric trolley passenger service between downtown Prescott and Fort Whipple from 1905 to 1911.

Arizona became a state in 1912. Troops stationed at Whipple Barracks were reassigned to other locations, and in 1913 Whipple Barracks was placed in a caretaker/un-garrisoned post status in 1913, and overseen by a small maintenance crew.

In 1918 during World War I, the U.S. Army reactivated Whipple Barracks as U.S. Army General Hospital #20. The hospital was designed to treat soldiers with respiratory illnesses, primarily tuberculosis (TB). Construction of new wards and other auxiliary buildings took place, including buildings for the American Red Cross and Young Men's Christian Association (YMCA) organizations.

In 1920 the property was loaned to the U.S. Public Health Service (USPHS) and operated under a permit from the War Department. The hospital was designated Hospital #50, Whipple Barracks, Arizona. The hospital retained its primary function in treating former soldiers with tuberculosis. The USPHS operated Whipple Barracks until Executive Order 3669 was signed on April 29, 1922. This executive order transferred the permit and functions of the hospital to the newly established U.S. Veterans Bureau. The facility became one of the most complete sanatoriums for the treatment of tuberculosis in the country.

On July 3, 1930, Public Law Number 536 authorized President Hoover by executive order to consolidate the U.S. Veterans Bureau along with several agencies focused on the treatment of veterans to become the Veterans Administration (VA). March 4, 1931, was the official date transferring the Whipple Barracks title and property from the United States Department of War, also called the War Department to the newly established Veterans Administration.

In 1935, 75 acres of the former Fort Whipple were set aside as a reservation for the Yavapai-Prescott Tribe.

The main hospital building (Building 107) was constructed between 1938 and 1939, and opened to receive patients in October 1939.

Continued pressure from the Yavapai-Prescott Tribe resulted in an additional 1320 acres being conferred on the tribe in 1956.ref name="Ortiz (1983)"/>

In July 1959, the VA re-designated Whipple VA hospital as a general medical and surgical hospital, in part due to the decline of tuberculosis patient load and increase of medical and surgical load.

On May 17, 1964, The Veterans Administration celebrated the 100-year anniversary of Fort Whipple. Medical Center Director Kenneth .J. O’Brien presided over the ceremony.

In February 1970, Yavapai College dedicated its first buildings in Prescott on a 100-acre (0.40 km^{2}) site that was once part of Fort Whipple.

In March 1989, the Veterans Administration became a cabinet-agency and was renamed as the United States Department of Veterans Affairs (VA).

During 1995, a reorganization of the entire agency occurred to refocus and address a variety of veteran's healthcare needs. The VA hospital in Prescott along with the other VA clinics that served the northern Arizona region was officially named the Northern Arizona VA Health Care System (NAVAHCS).

On April 17, 2004, the VA hospital/medical center complex at Prescott, Arizona, was renamed the Bob Stump Department of Veterans Affairs Medical Center, after Congressman Stump, Chairman of the House Armed Services Committee.

On July 29, 2005, as part of the 75th anniversary celebration of the Veterans Administration/Department of Veterans Affairs (VA), a time capsule was buried near the main circle in front of the main hospital building. The time capsule will be opened in July 2030 during the 100th anniversary celebration of the VA.

Significant expansion and construction has occurred since the time the VA acquired Whipple Barracks. Notable buildings include the Community Living Center (Building 148), which was built in two phases, Phase 1 between 1987 and 1989, and Phase 2 between 1995 and 1997; the Domiciliary (Building 151) built between 1988 and 1990; the new Outpatient Mental Health building (Building 161) built between 2014 and 2015; the new Pharmacy/Laboratory building built between 2016 and 2018.

In April 2020, Gorman & Company and U.S. Vets were selected to build and manage affordable housing for senior, homeless, and at-risk veterans on the Prescott campus of the Northern Arizona VA Health Care System (NAVAHCS). Renovation of six former Officer's quarters and the construction of a four-story building commenced in December 2024. One and two-bedroom apartments will be constructed in the former Officer's quarters, and eighty one-bedroom apartments constructed in a new four-story building. The project started in December 2024. Renovation of the former quarters were completed in January 2026, and the construction of the new four-story apartment building titled "The Post at Fort Whipple" was completed in July 2026. To date, all apartments are occupied.

Certified on the National Register of Historic Places in 1999 by the National Park Service, the historic name of Fort Whipple is listed as "Fort Whipple/Department of Veterans Affairs Medical Center Historic District."

== Fort Whipple Museum and other historic structures ==
Former military officer's quarters, Building 11 is now Fort Whipple Museum. The museum opened in 2004 and is painted light yellow and dark green. Fort Whipple Museum has artifacts and historical displays about the fort and hospital, including medical instruments, Army weaponry, the Buffalo Soldiers, maps, and photographs. The museum is operated as a joint project of the Sharlot Hall Museum and the Northern Arizona VA Health Care System, Bob Stump VA Medical Center in Prescott, Arizona. The museum is currently open on Fridays only from 10 a.m. to 4 p.m.. Plans to add additional days will be based on demand and volunteer staffing.

Also pictured are the historic buildings that were built between 1903 and 1908:

- The Fort Whipple Officers' Quarters
- The Fort Whipple NCO Quarters
- The Fort Whipple Army Barracks
- The Fort Whipple Post Headquarters
- The Fort Whipple Post Hospital
- The Fort Whipple Theater
- The Fort Whipple Guardhouse
Fort Whipple Museum

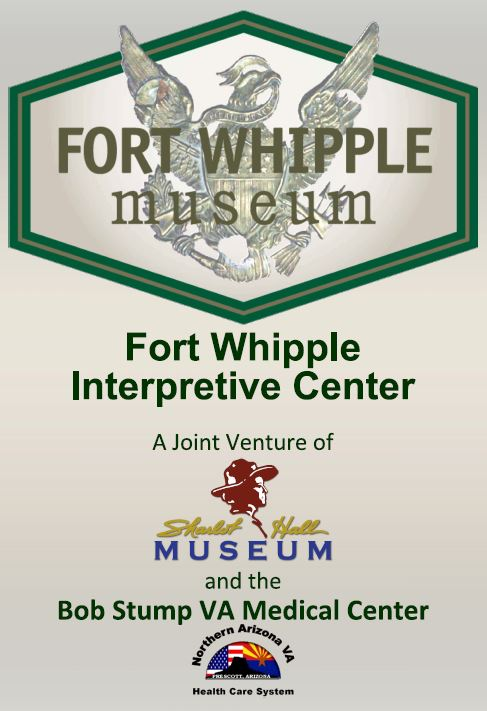
Fort Whipple Museum

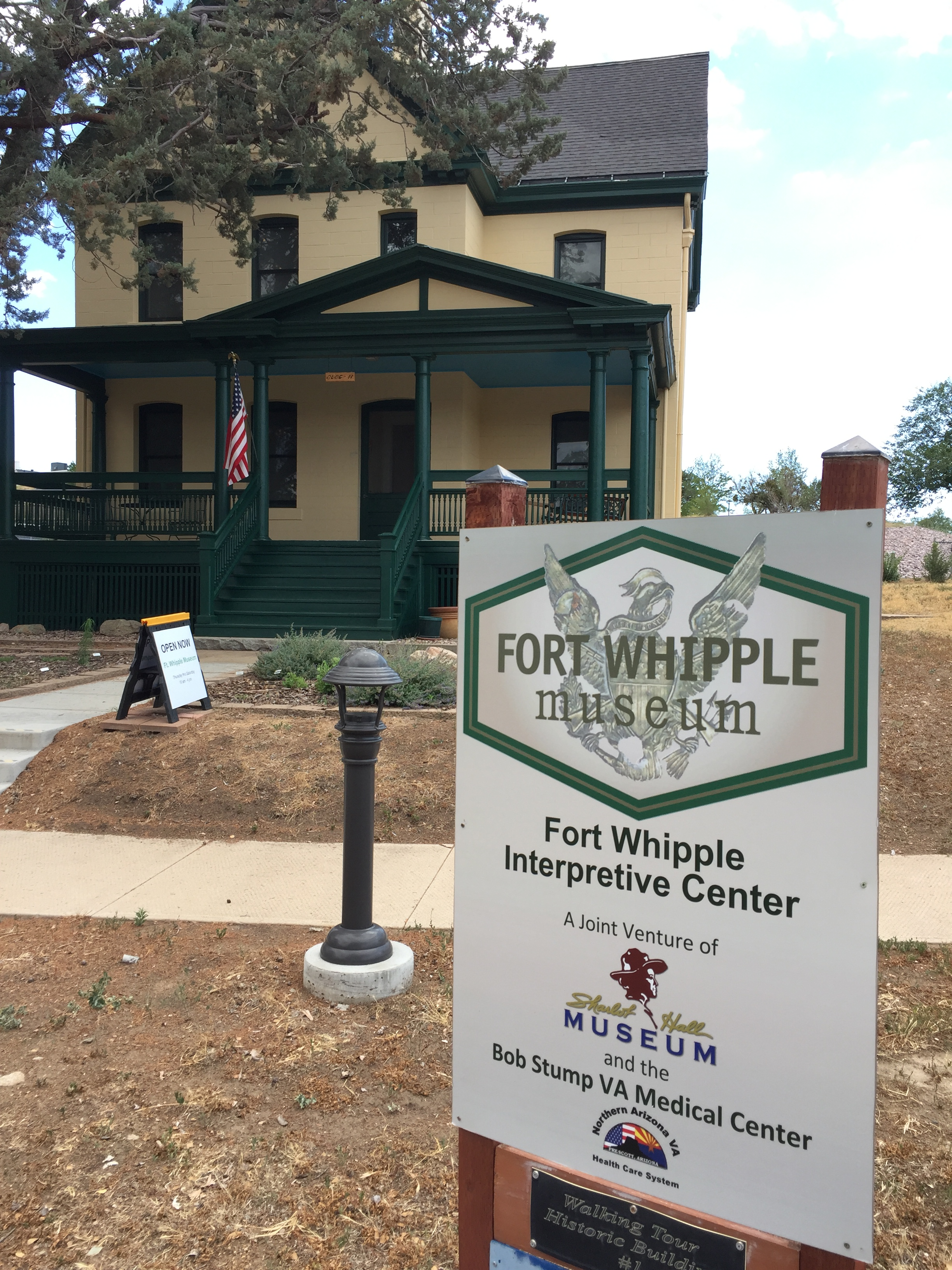
Fort Whipple Museum, Building 11

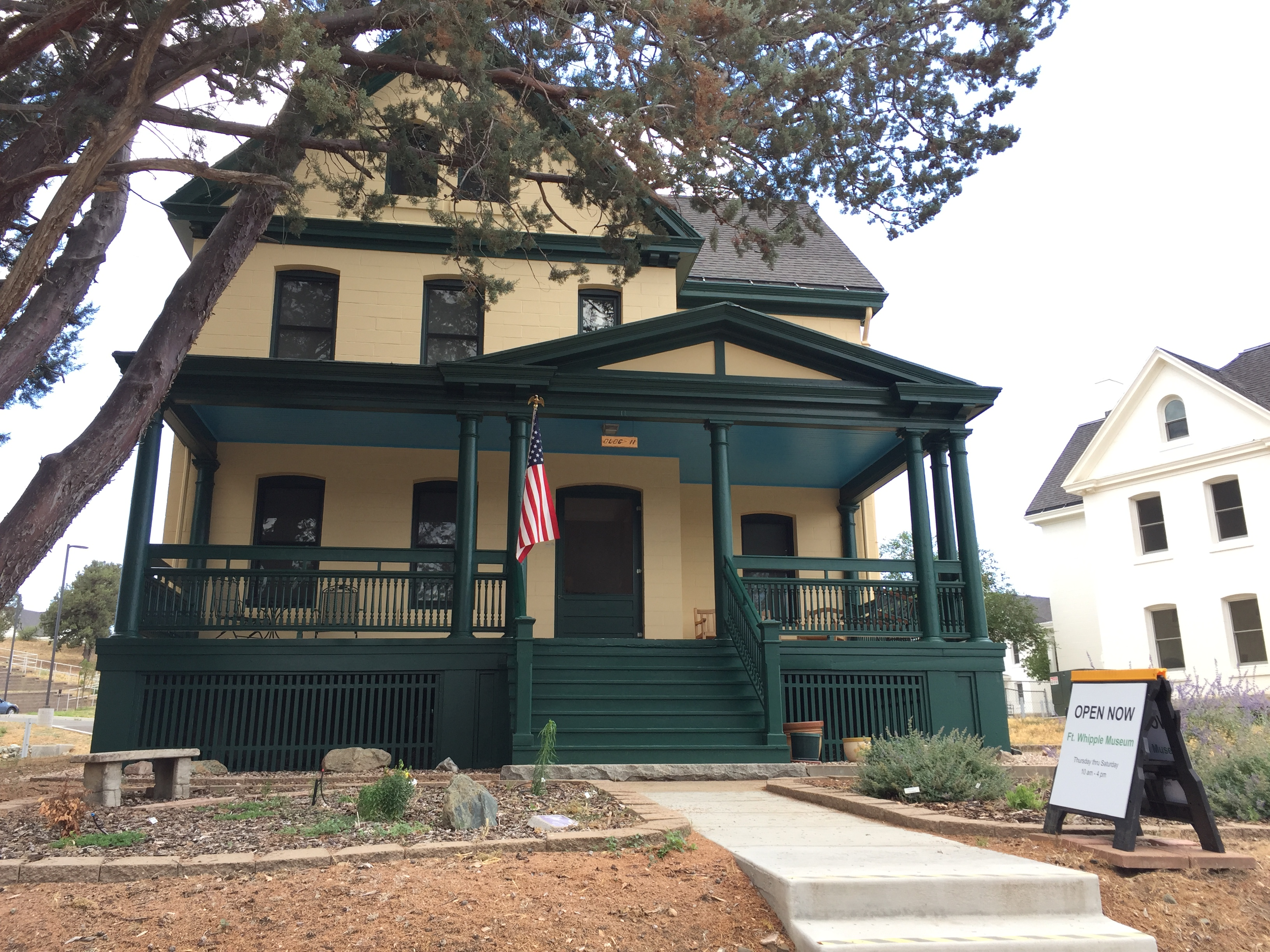
Fort Whipple Museum, Building 11

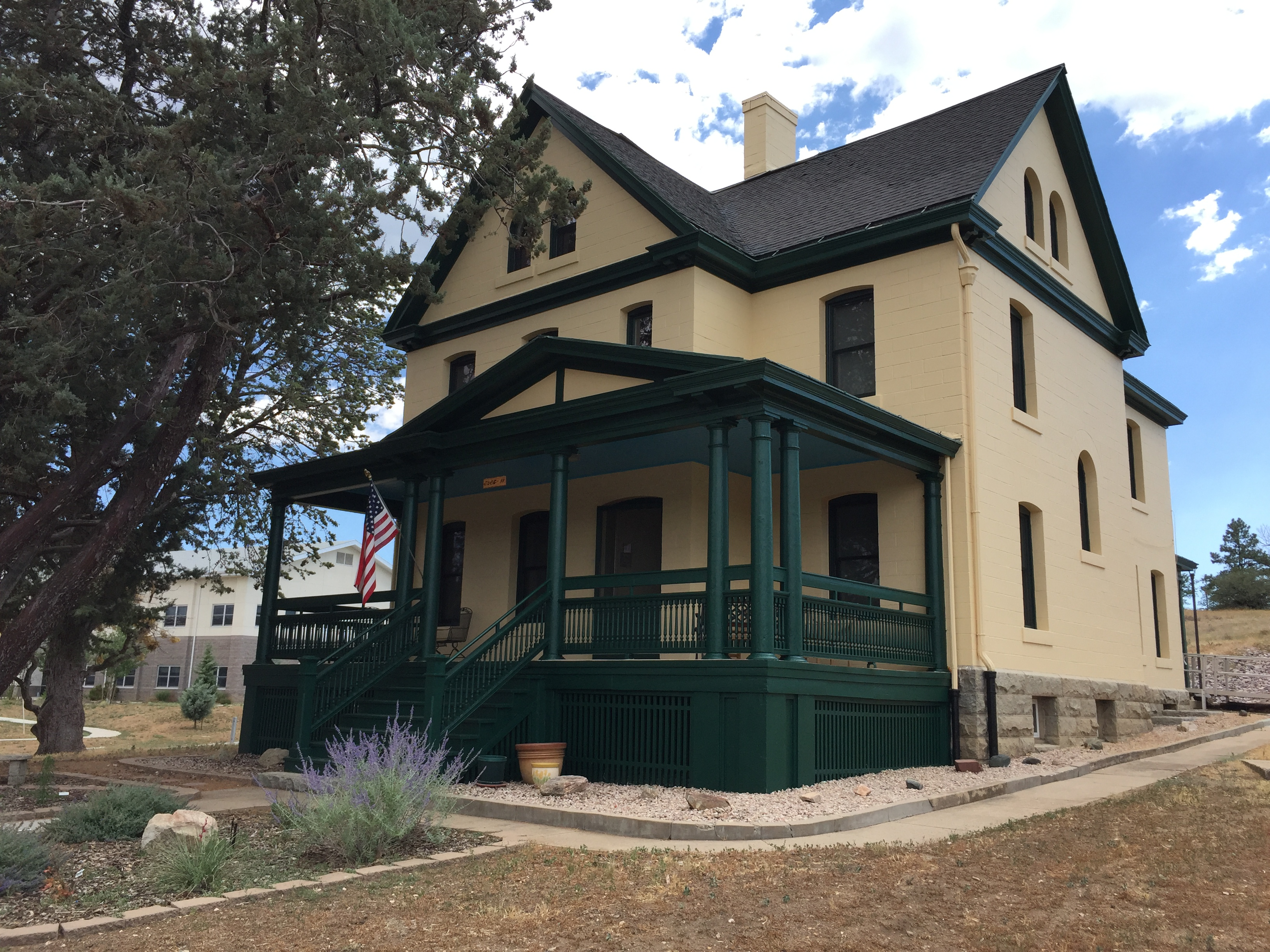
Fort Whipple Museum, Building 11

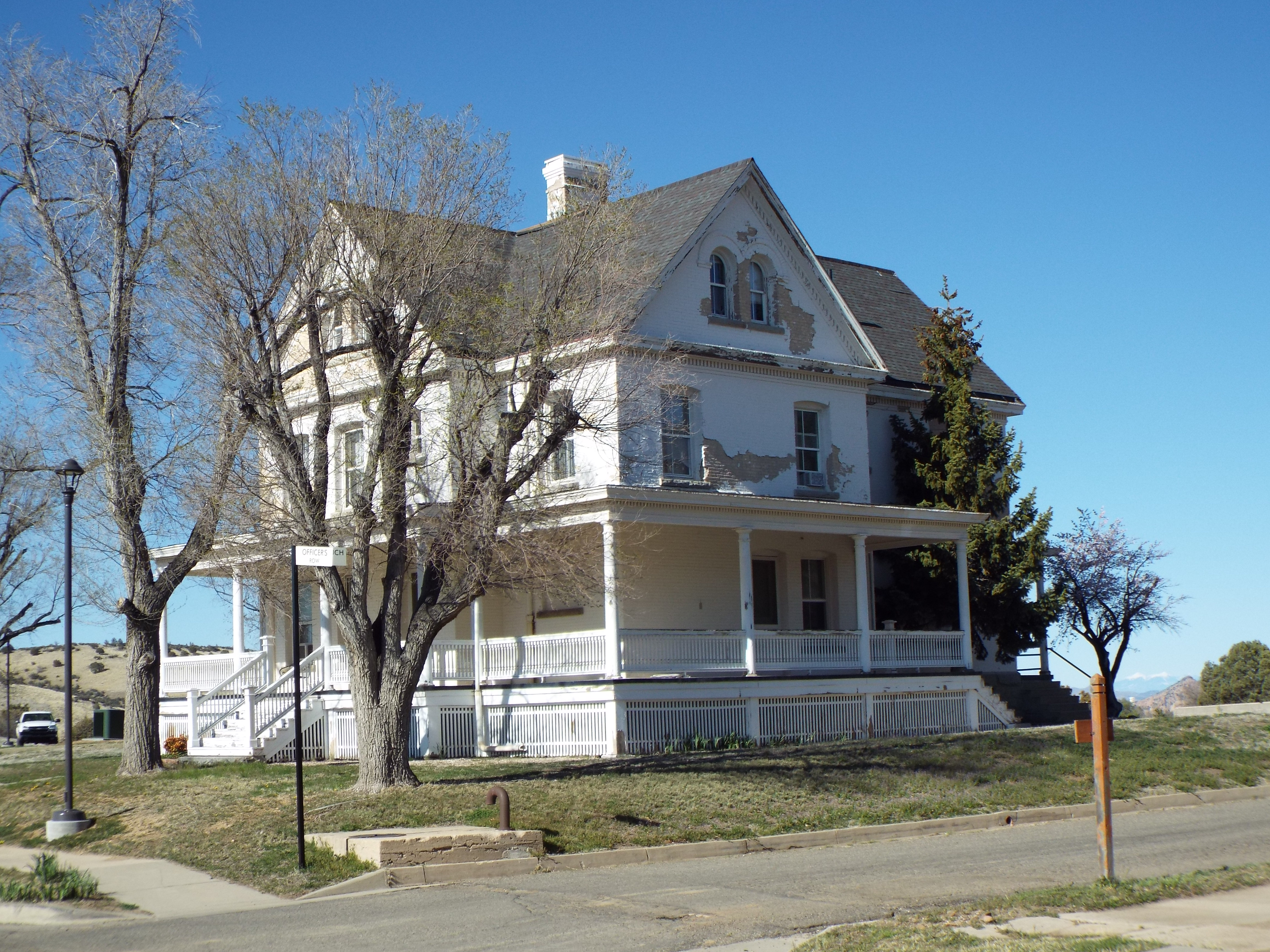
Fort Whipple Officers Quarters

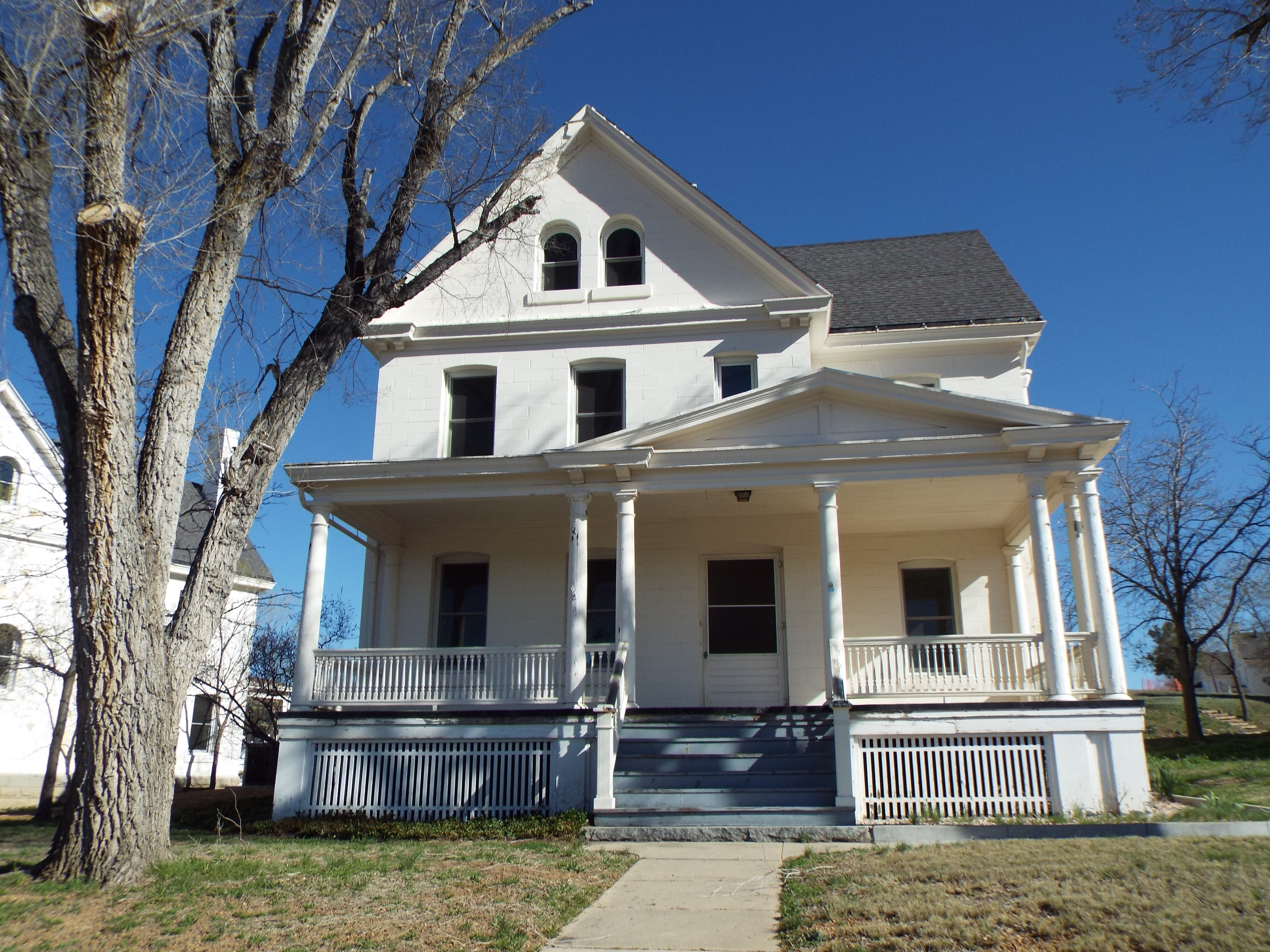
Fort Whipple Officers Quarters in Officer's Row

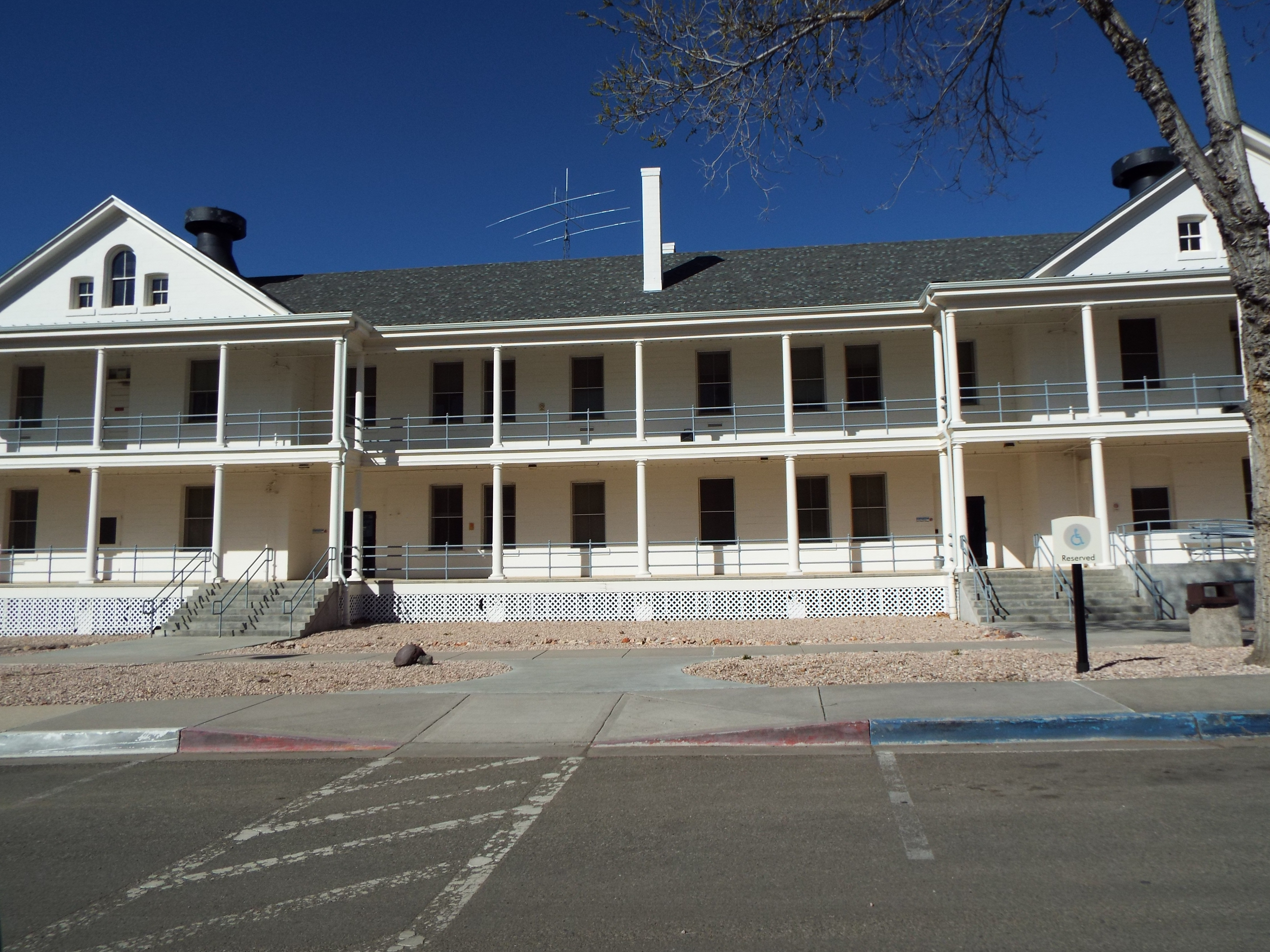
Fort Whipple Army Barracks

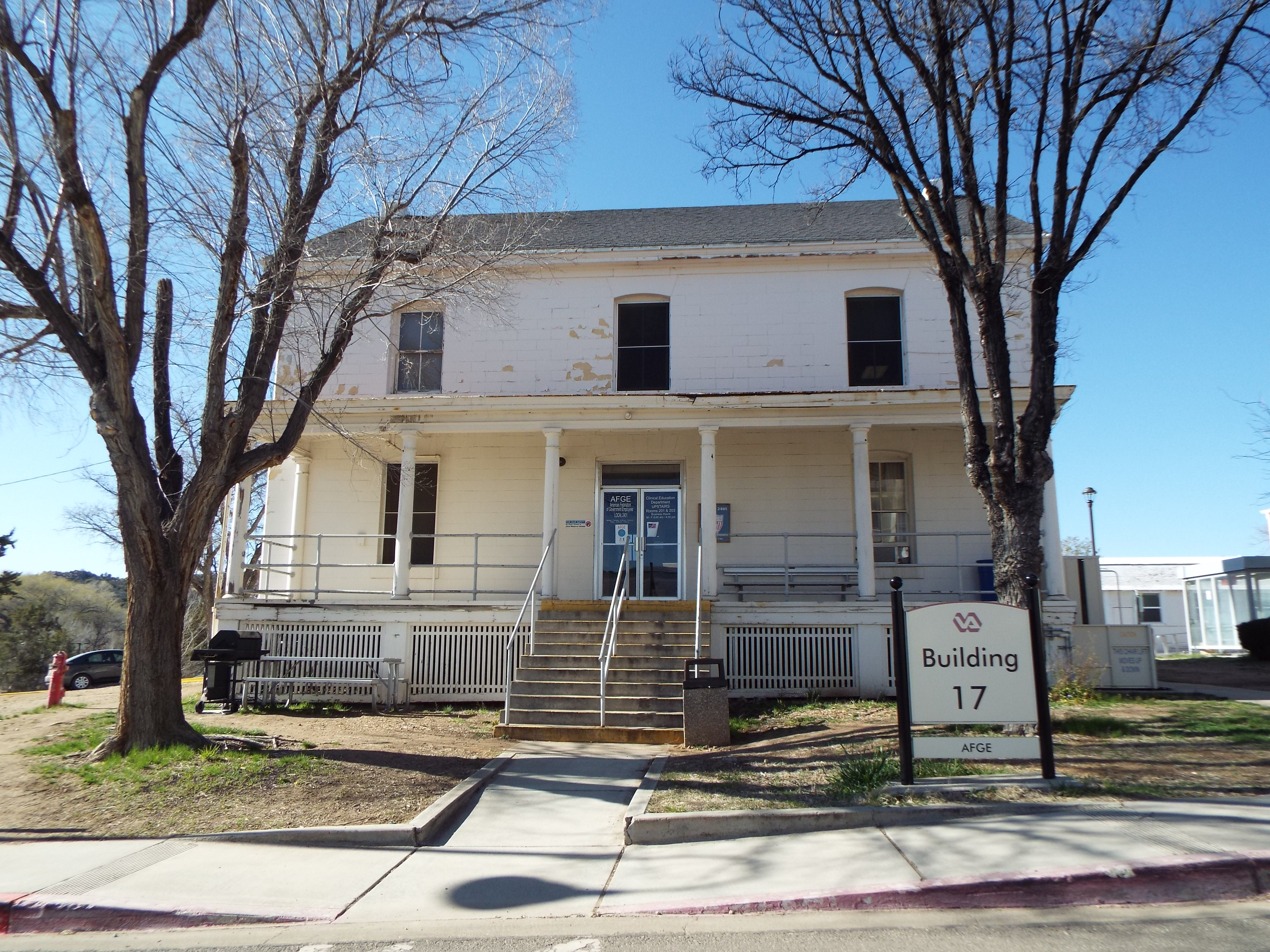
Fort Whipple Post Headquarters

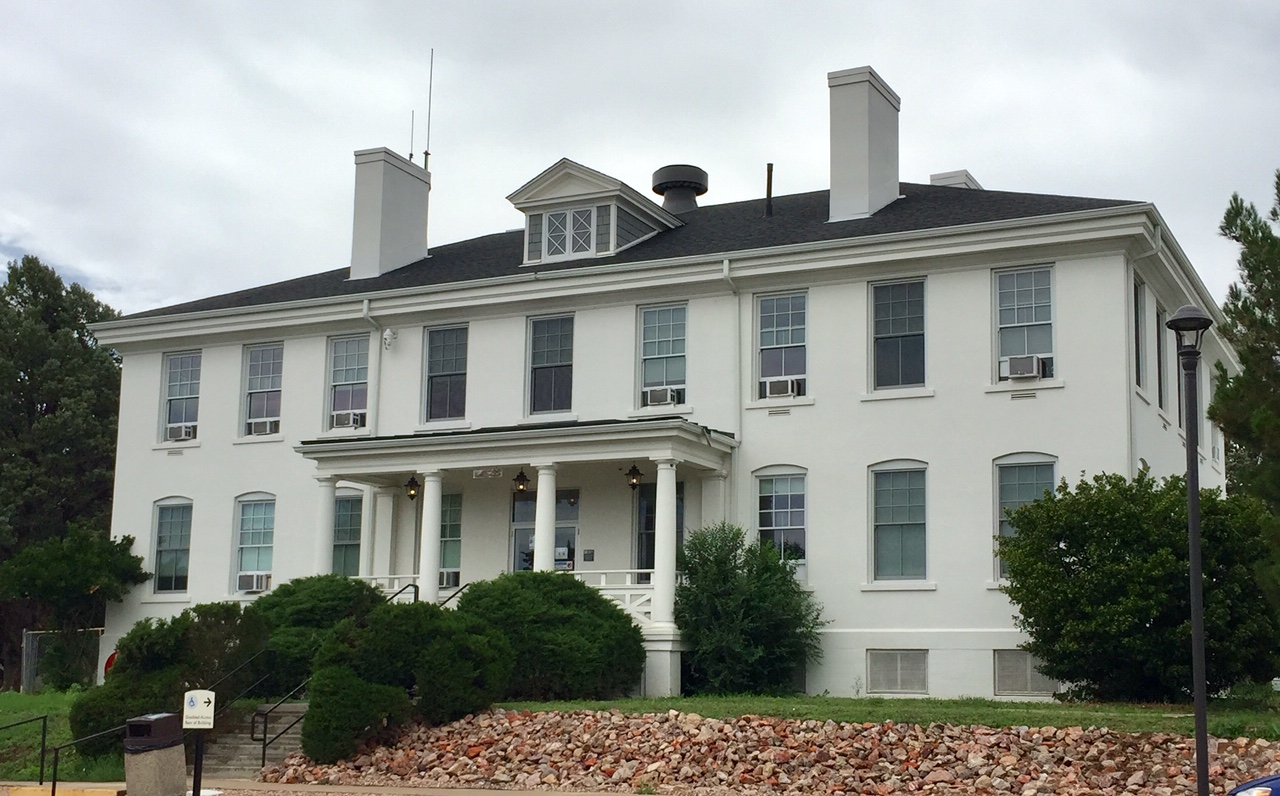
Fort Whipple Post Hospital

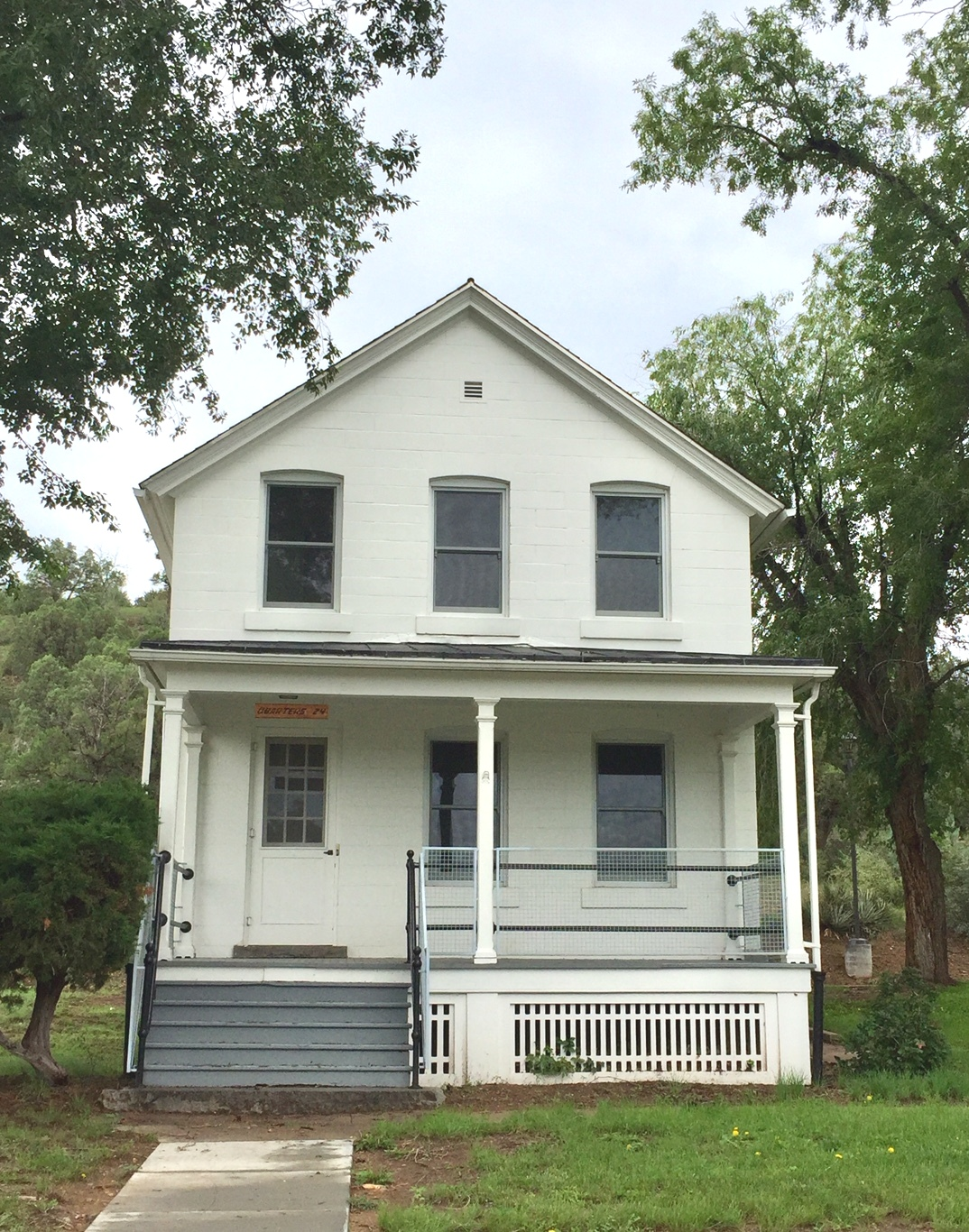
Fort Whipple Non-commissioned Officers' Quarters

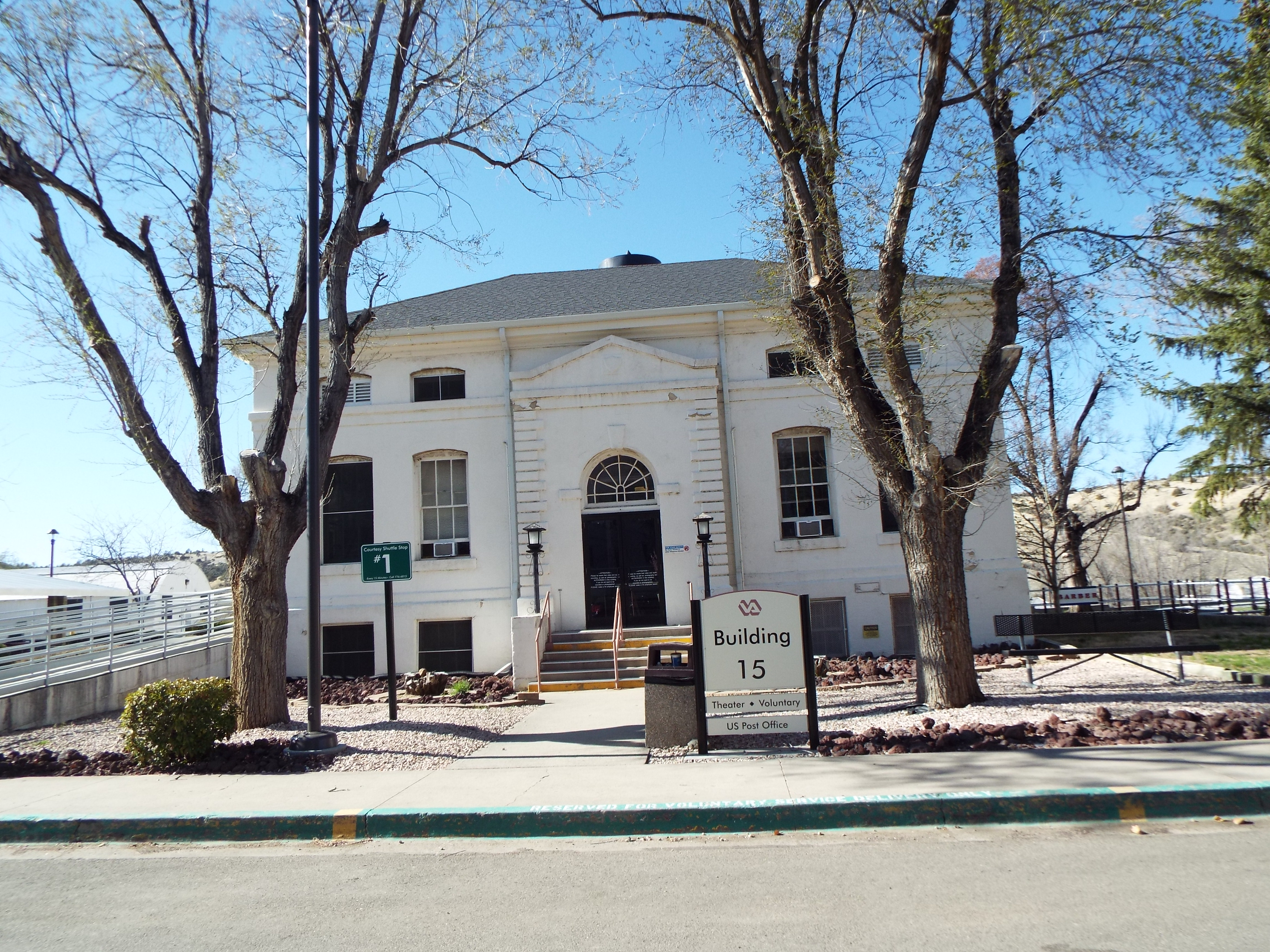
Fort Whipple Theater

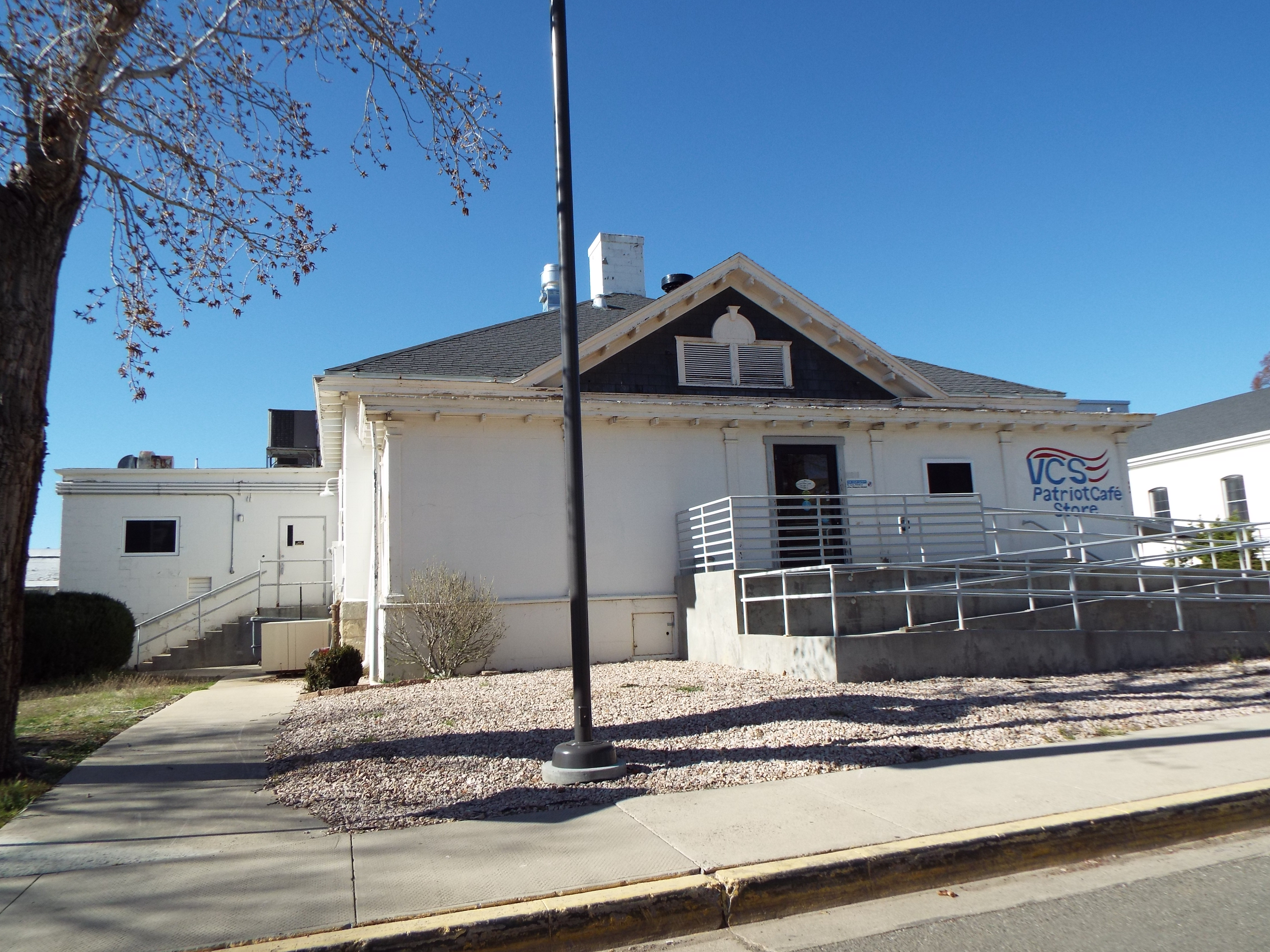
Fort Whipple Guardhouse

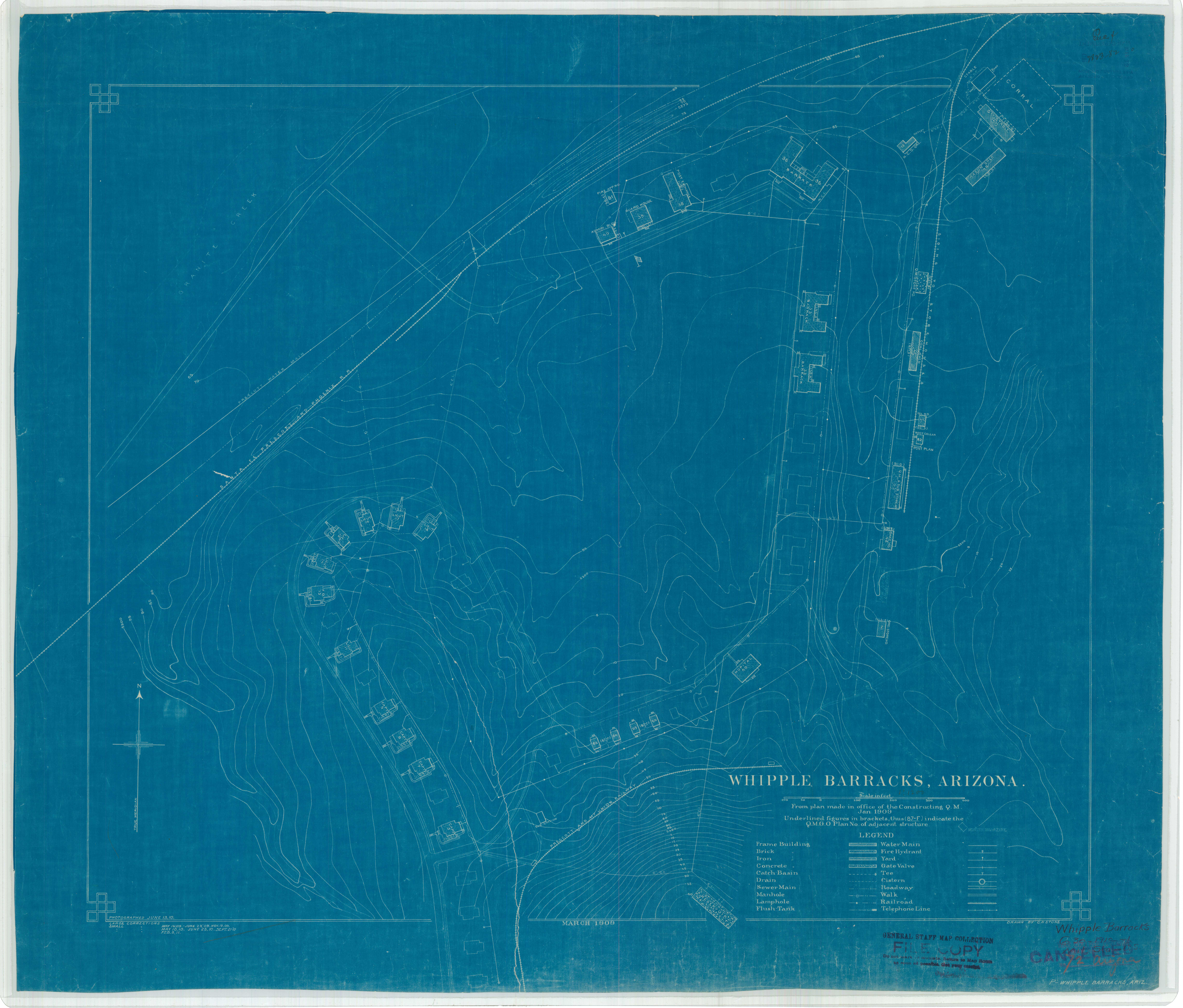
Whipple Barracks map, March 1909 (National Archives ID 103396459)

== Original location ==
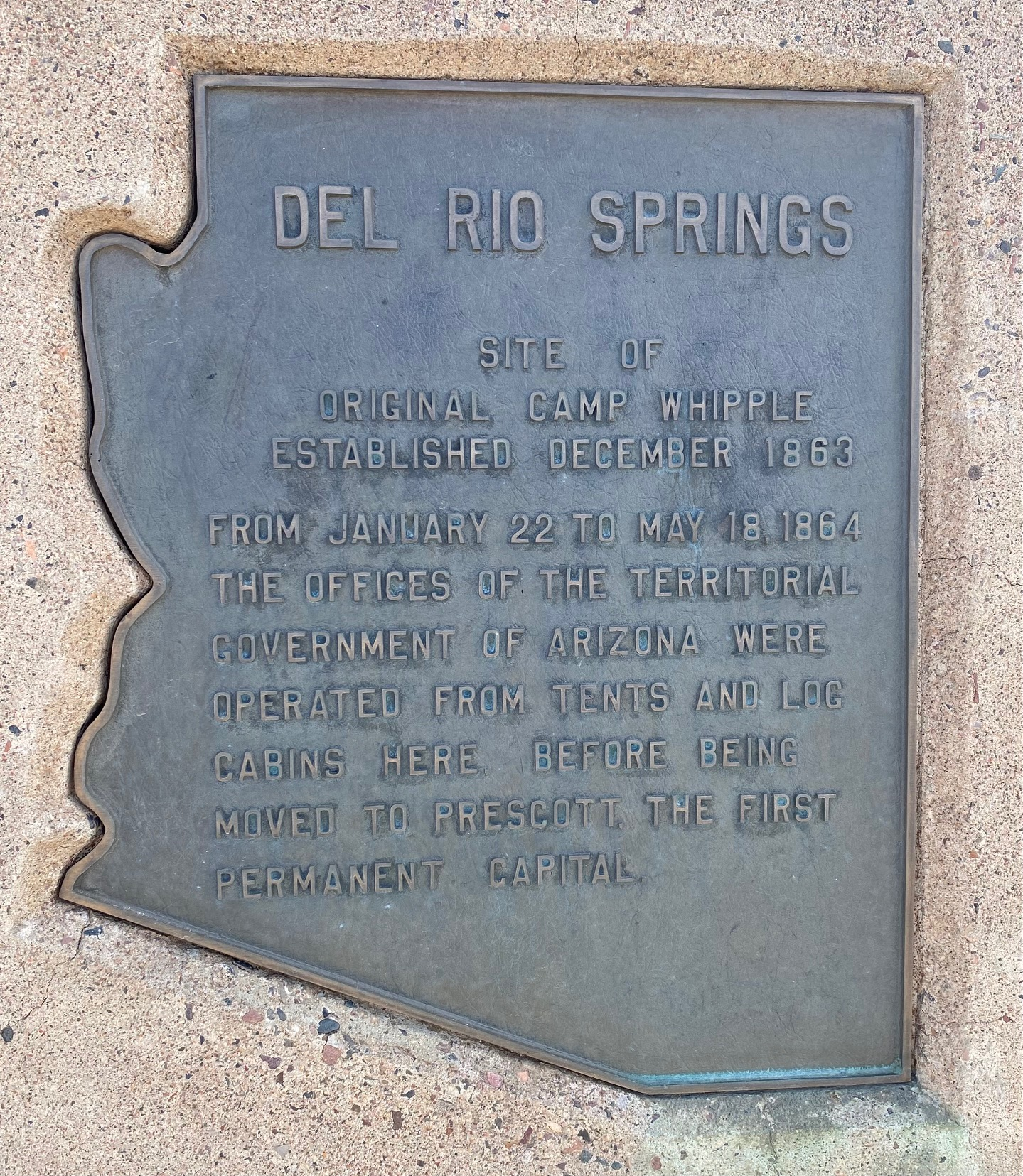
Del Rio Springs (north of Chino Valley, Arizona) historical marker. This site is where Fort Whipple was originally established

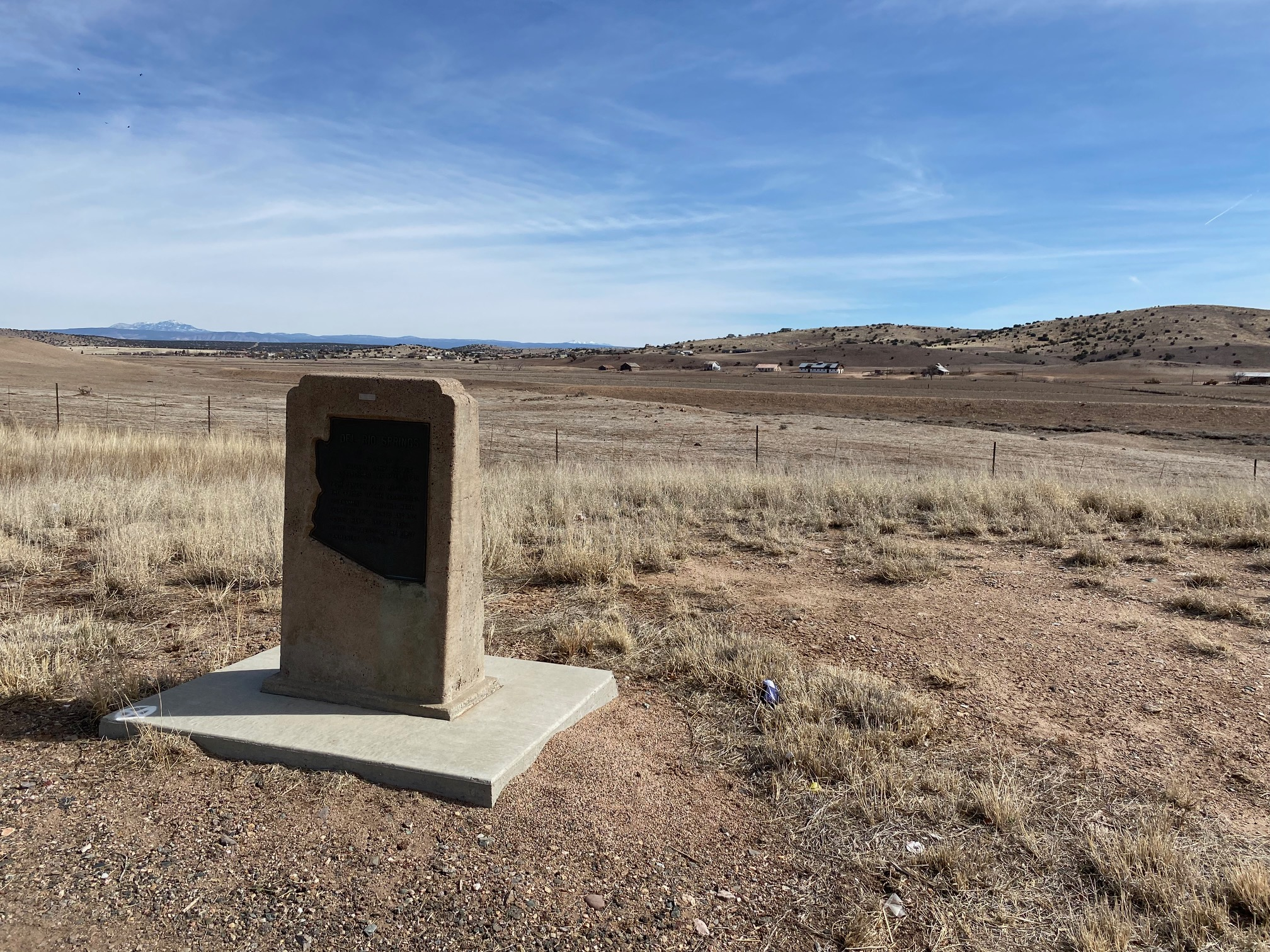

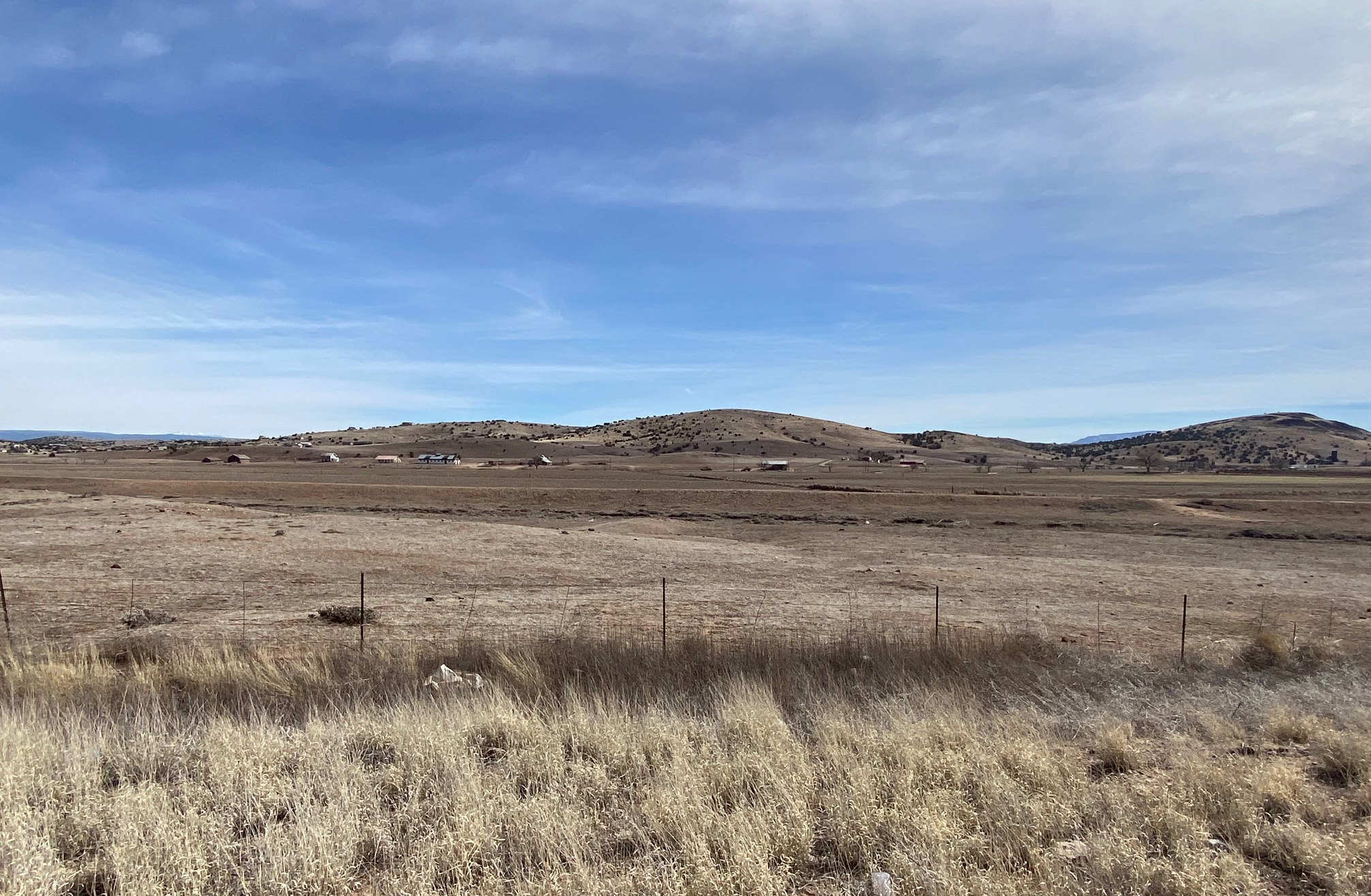

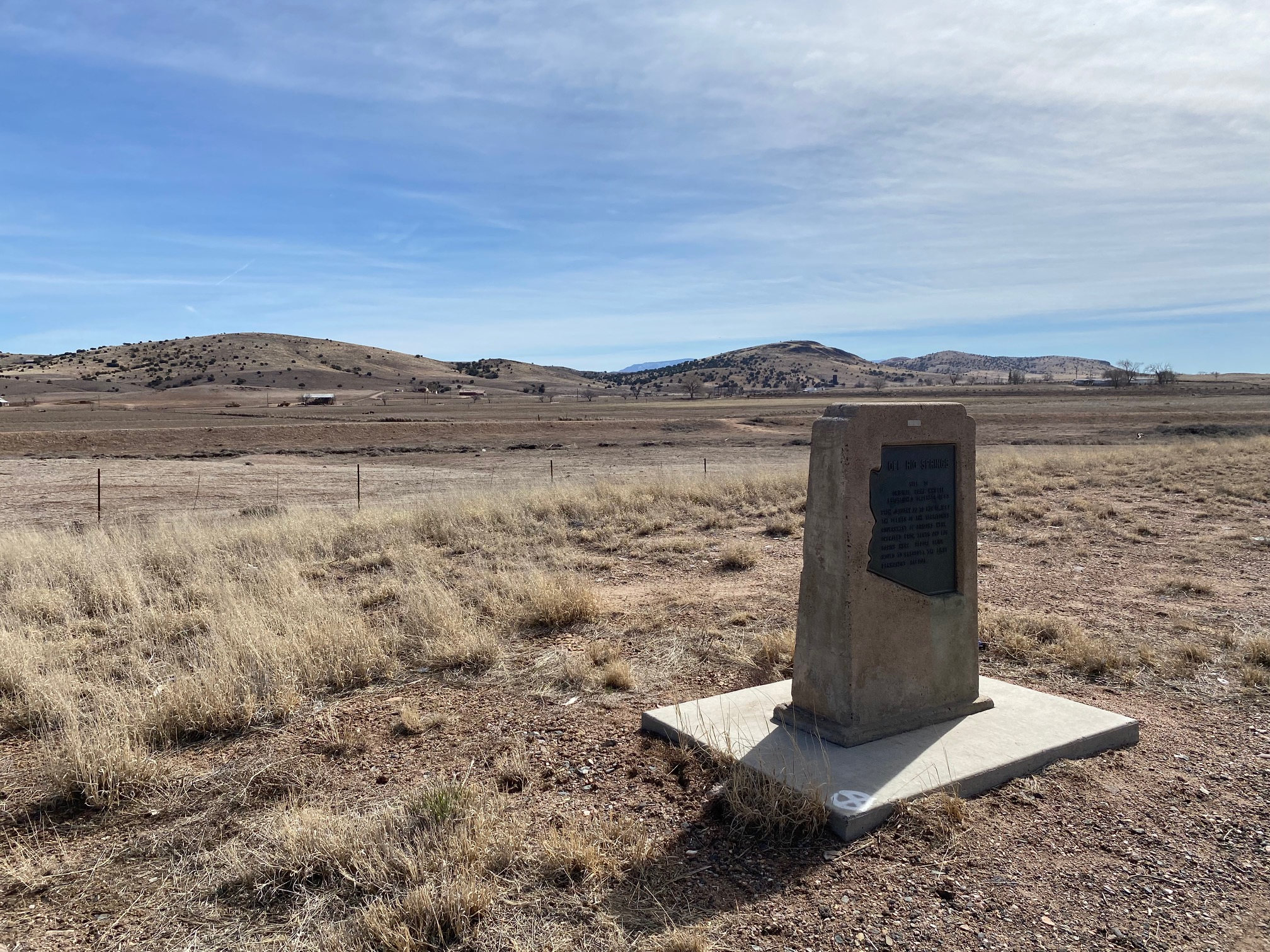
