= Alfred Pollard =

Alfred Pollard may refer to:

- Alfred W. Pollard (1859–1944), English writer, bibliographer and painter
- Al Pollard (Alfred Lee Pollard, 1928–2002), American football player
- Alfred Oliver Pollard (1893–1960), English Army Officer, decorated World War I hero and author
