= Robin Hunter =

Robin Hunter may refer to:

- Robin Hunter (actor) (1929–2004), English actor
- Robin Hunter (psychiatrist) (1919–1987), Canadian psychiatrist
- Robin Hunter (British Army officer) (1919–2016)

== See also ==
- Robin Hunter-Clarke, British Reform UK politician and solicitor
