= Ranger Regiment (United Kingdom) =

Special Operations unit of the British Army

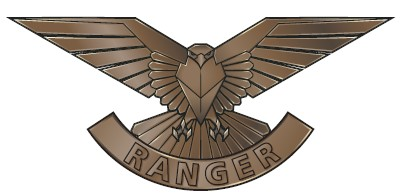
- Cap badge of the Ranger Regiment
- Active: 1 December 2021 – present
- Country: United Kingdom
- Branch: British Army
- Type: Special operations forces
- Size: Four battalions of ≈ 250 personnel; ≈ 1,000 personnel in total
- Part of: Land Special Operations Force
- Motto: By All Means

Commanders
- Current commander: Brigadier Gus Fair As of 25 November 2021
- Colonel: Lieutenant-General Sir Ralph Wooddisse

The Ranger Regiment is a regiment and a special operations force of the British Army which was formed on 1 December 2021 under the Future Soldier reform. It is intended to be used primarily in an unconventional warfare and foreign internal defence capacity in a similar manner to the US Army Special Forces.

== History ==
On 22 March 2021, the Defence in a Competitive Age paper was released underlining the future of the British Armed Forces. As part of a wider reorganisation of the British Army, the following was announced:

A new four-battalion Ranger Regiment will be formed in August 2021, seeded from the Royal Scots Borderers, 1st Battalion Royal Regiment of Scotland; 2nd Battalion, Princess of Wales's Royal Regiment; 2nd Battalion, Duke of Lancaster's Regiment; and 4th Battalion, The Rifles. The new regiment will sit within the redesignated Specialised Infantry Group, becoming the Army Special Operations Brigade.

— British Army, Army Special Operations Brigade

Initially, the regiment is planned to be "based on four Infantry Battalions but selecting personnel from across the Army". The regiment's task will be as follows: "[It will be] designed to support and conduct special operations discreetly in high-risk environments". According to a reporter of Forces News, the regiment will "conduct missions traditionally carried out by United Kingdom Special Forces (Special Air Service and Special Boat Service)". During an interview with the (then) Chief of the Defence Staff, General Sir Nick Carter, the rangers will be "special forces" and will "go beyond training, advising, and assisting" to "support local operations". He also stated the Ranger's functions will be similar to the "Green Berets" (US Army Special Forces).

The regiment was initially due to form in August 2021, but this was subsequently postponed to 1 December 2021. In early 2022 soldiers from the regiment deployed as part of a UK government support package to Ukraine. In February 2022 soldiers from the regiment deployed to Ghana to conduct training with the Ghanaian Special Operations Brigade, in preparation for a major exercise as well as to help them eliminate threats originating from their border regions.

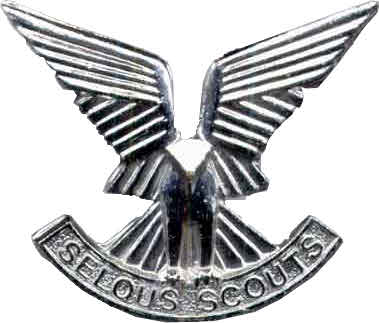
The cap badge of the Selous Scouts, which some officers believed bore a resemblance to the badge of the Ranger Regiment.

After it was revealed to the public, some army officers were concerned that the cap badge of the Ranger Regiment bore a resemblance to the badge of the Selous Scouts, a special forces unit of the Rhodesian Army which operated during the Rhodesian Bush War. The British Army rejected the claims, stating that the badge was designed around the peregrine falcon, not the osprey in the Selous Scouts' cap badge.

Elements of the Ranger Regiment deployed to Ukraine in 2022 to provide anti-tank training. In October 2022 elements of the 3rd Battalion conducted exercises with the 193rd Jägarbataljonen, part of the Swedish Norrland Dragoon Regiment, specialised arctic light infantry.

In March 2024, the Armed Forces Minister, James Heappey, said that the Ranger Regiment had deployed 691 times since 2021 and that, as of 1 January 2024, it consisted of 1,040 regular Army personnel.

== Regimental organisation ==
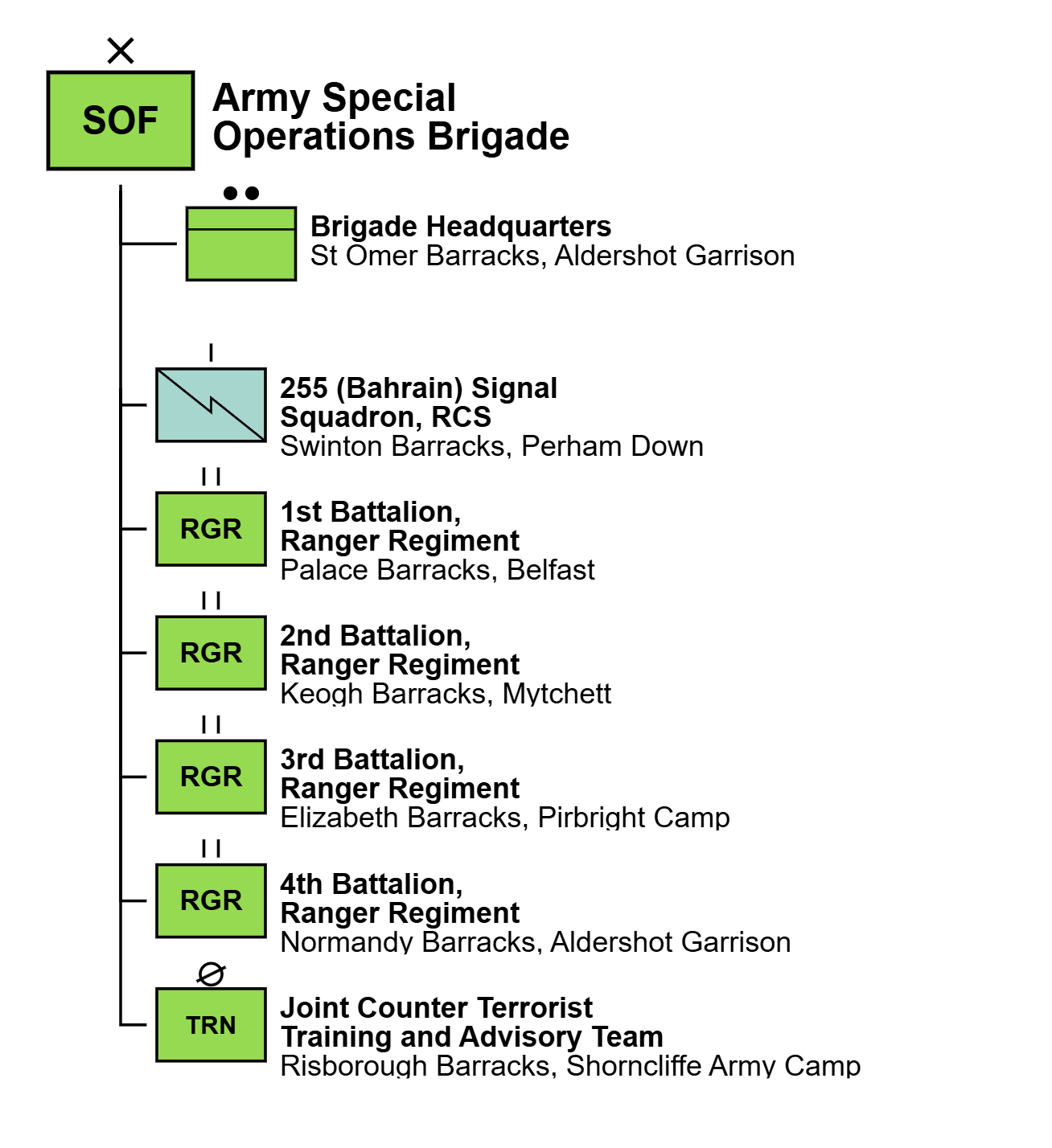
Organisational structure of the Army Special Operations Brigade, which includes the Ranger Regiment.

The regiment was formed on 1 December 2021 through the renaming of four of the existing Specialised Infantry battalions. All four battalions were formed on 1 December 2021 and fall under the Army Special Operations Brigade, operationally they are aligned to regions around the globe.

A gun-metal grey beret and stable belt are worn by the Regiment. The four battalions of the Ranger Regiment each consist of ≈ 250 personnel.

=== 1st Battalion ===
The 1st Battalion, Ranger Regiment (1 RANGER) was formed by the personnel of the disbanded Royal Scots Borderers, 1st Battalion, Royal Regiment of Scotland. The battalion is based at Palace Barracks in Belfast, Northern Ireland. It is regionally aligned to Southern Europe.

=== 2nd Battalion ===
The 2nd Battalion, Ranger Regiment (2 RANGER) was formed by the personnel of the disbanded 2nd Battalion, Princess of Wales's Royal Regiment (Queen's and Royal Hampshires). The battalion is based at Keogh Barracks, Ash Vale, Surrey. It is regionally aligned to Africa.

=== 3rd Battalion ===
The 3rd Battalion, Ranger Regiment (3 RANGER) was formed by the personnel of the disbanded 2nd Battalion, Duke of Lancaster's Regiment (King's, Lancashire and Border). The battalion is currently based at Elizabeth Barracks, Pirbright, but will move to Keogh Barracks in 2027. It is regionally aligned to Northern Europe.

=== 4th Battalion ===
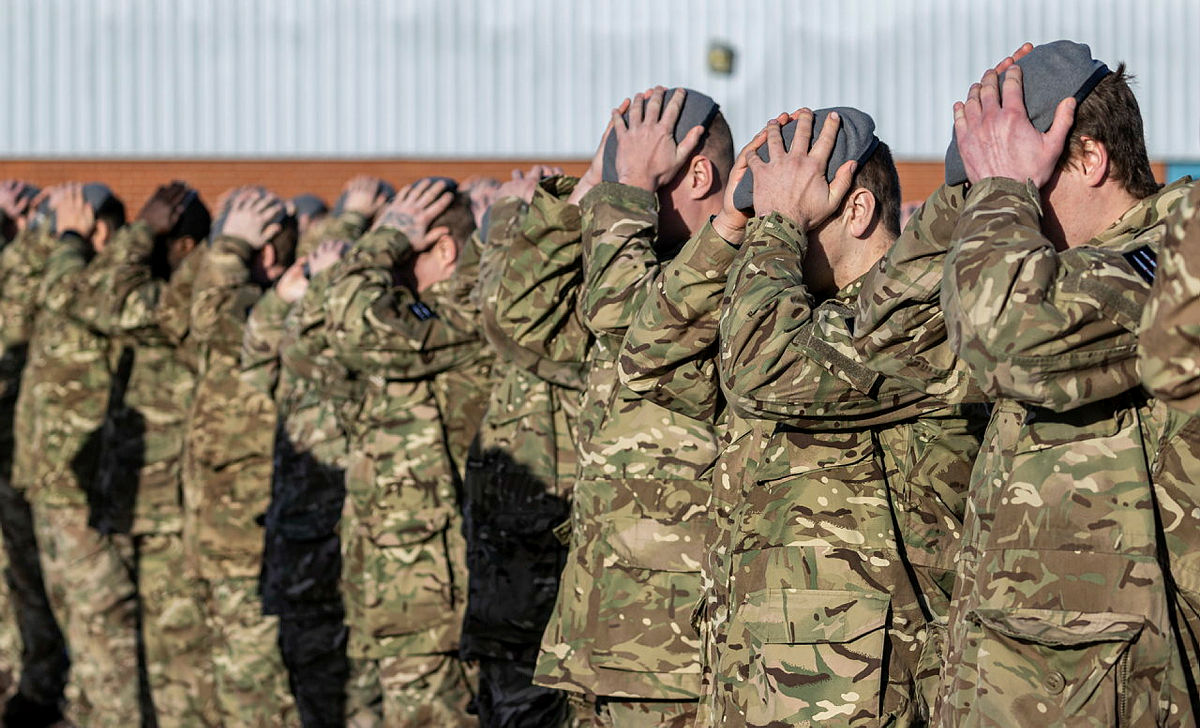
4th Rangers receiving their new berets in 2021. The battalion is now earmarked for Middle East activities.

The 4th Battalion, Ranger Regiment (4 RANGER) was formed by the personnel of the disbanded 4th Battalion, The Rifles. The battalion is based at Normandy Barracks, Aldershot Garrison. It is regionally aligned to the Middle East and Indo-Pacific.

=== Reinforcement companies ===
The regiment also includes a trio of Gurkha reinforcement companies. These were raised as part of the plan to reform the 3rd Battalion, Royal Gurkha Rifles, which would be the fifth battalion assigned to the Specialised Infantry Group. A (Coriano) Company was formed on 31 January 2020 as the first sub-unit of the new battalion. The formation of the new battalion's second company was planned for 18 November 2021, but prior to this taking place, the formation of the new battalion was cancelled, with the two companies instead to be used as independent units attached to other battalions of the new Ranger Regiment. Upon the formation of the Rangers, the second formed company, F (Falklands) Company, was attached to 2 RANGER, while the original company, renamed as G (Coriano) Company, was attached to 4 RANGER. A third company, A (Krithia) Company, was formed in September 2024, to operate as part of 1 RANGER, becoming the first Gurkha unit to be stationed in Northern Ireland.

== Team organisation ==
The Ranger Regiment is organised into "teams" of 11 personnel similar to United States Army Special Forces ODAs, which consist of 12 soldiers, each of whom has a particular specialist role.

== Training and selection ==
The Ranger battalions were planned to be "all-arms" battalions and thus be open to anyone serving in the Army, providing that they have served for 18 months from completing basic training. All applicants to the ranger regiment have to undertake a two-week Ranger assessment cadre (RAC), followed by a ten week All Arms Ranger course (AARC) before joining their battalion. Brigadier Gus Fair, then commander of the Ranger Regiment, said the RAC involves "protracted periods of time under duress" and seeks to select applicants with emotional intelligence, resilience, calmness and self-awareness.
