= Army Special Operations Brigade =

British Army special operations formation

- Brigade flash
- Active: 2021 – 14 April 2026
- Country: United Kingdom
- Branch: British Army
- Type: Special operations-capable
- Role: Special Operations; Unconventional Warfare; Security Force Assistance; Foreign internal defence Counterinsurgency
- Size: Brigade
- Part of: Land Special Operations Force

The Army Special Operations Brigade, previously called the Specialised Infantry Group, was a formation of the British Army, initially created as a result of the Army 2020 Refine reorganisation, intended to train foreign forces. Its name and role was adapted after the Defence in a Competitive Age reforms, to a unit that not only trains partner nations, but also fights alongside them in "complex high-threat environments". The brigade was disbanded in spring 2026 and its units assigned to Land Special Operations Force.

== History ==
=== Specialised Infantry Group ===
The group was formed to work alongside partner forces, a role which has similarities to that of the US Army Security Force Assistance Brigades. Officially formed in October 2017 with the 4th Battalion, The Rifles (4 Rifles) and Royal Scots Borderers, 1st Battalion, Royal Regiment of Scotland (1 Scots). in July 2018, the 2nd Battalion, Princess of Wales' Royal Regiment was added to the Group. and in January 2019, a fourth battalion, the 2nd Battalion, Duke of Lancaster's Regiment, was added and this was followed by the 3rd Battalion, The Royal Gurkha Rifles in 2020.

In August 2017, Team 5 from B Company 1 Scots were the first team to deploy on operations under the Specialised Infantry Group. Being deployed to Somalia, training the Somalia National Army for their ongoing fight against Al-Shabaab. In February 2018, 4 Rifles deployed for the first time to Kuwait to work with the Kuwait Army and Kuwait National Guard. R Company, It also trained the Afghan Army and forces in Iraq and Afghanistan. In July 2018, C Company from the 2 PWRR was dispatched to Nigeria, where 1 Scots also trained the Nigerian Army for their fight against Boko Haram.

=== Army Special Operations Brigade ===
In August 2021 the group was re-designated as the Army Special Operations Brigade consisting of the four battalions of the newly created Ranger Regiment, two reinforcement companies of the Royal Gurkha Rifles, 255 Signal Squadron under command, and 1 Squadron Honourable Artillery Company attached to provide long-range surveillance patrols.

The mentoring and training role previously undertaken by the Specialised Infantry Group was taken on by a new brigade formed through the conversion of the 11th Infantry Brigade into the 11th Security Force Assistance Brigade.

The inaugural Brigade Commander was Brigadier Angus Fair DSO* OBE who formerly commanded the Specialised Infantry Group.

By 2024, the brigade had been transferred from the disbanded 6 (UK) Division to the Land Special Operations Force set up in 1 December 2023 under Field Army Troops.

== Structure ==
=== Former Structure (2021) ===
The structure of the Specialised Infantry Group in March 2021 was as follows:

- Group Headquarters at Saint Omer Barracks, Aldershot Garrison
  - Royal Scots Borderers, 1st Battalion, Royal Regiment of Scotland (1 SCOTS), at Palace Barracks, Belfast
  - 2nd Battalion, Princess of Wales's Royal Regiment (2 PWRR), at Keogh Barracks, Mytchett
  - 2nd Battalion, Duke of Lancaster's Regiment (2 LANCS), at Elizabeth Barracks, Pirbright Camp
  - 4th Battalion, The Rifles (4 RIFLES), at Normandy Barracks, Aldershot Garrison
  - 3rd Battalion, The Royal Gurkha Rifles (3 RGR), at Aldershot Garrison

=== Future Structure (2030) ===
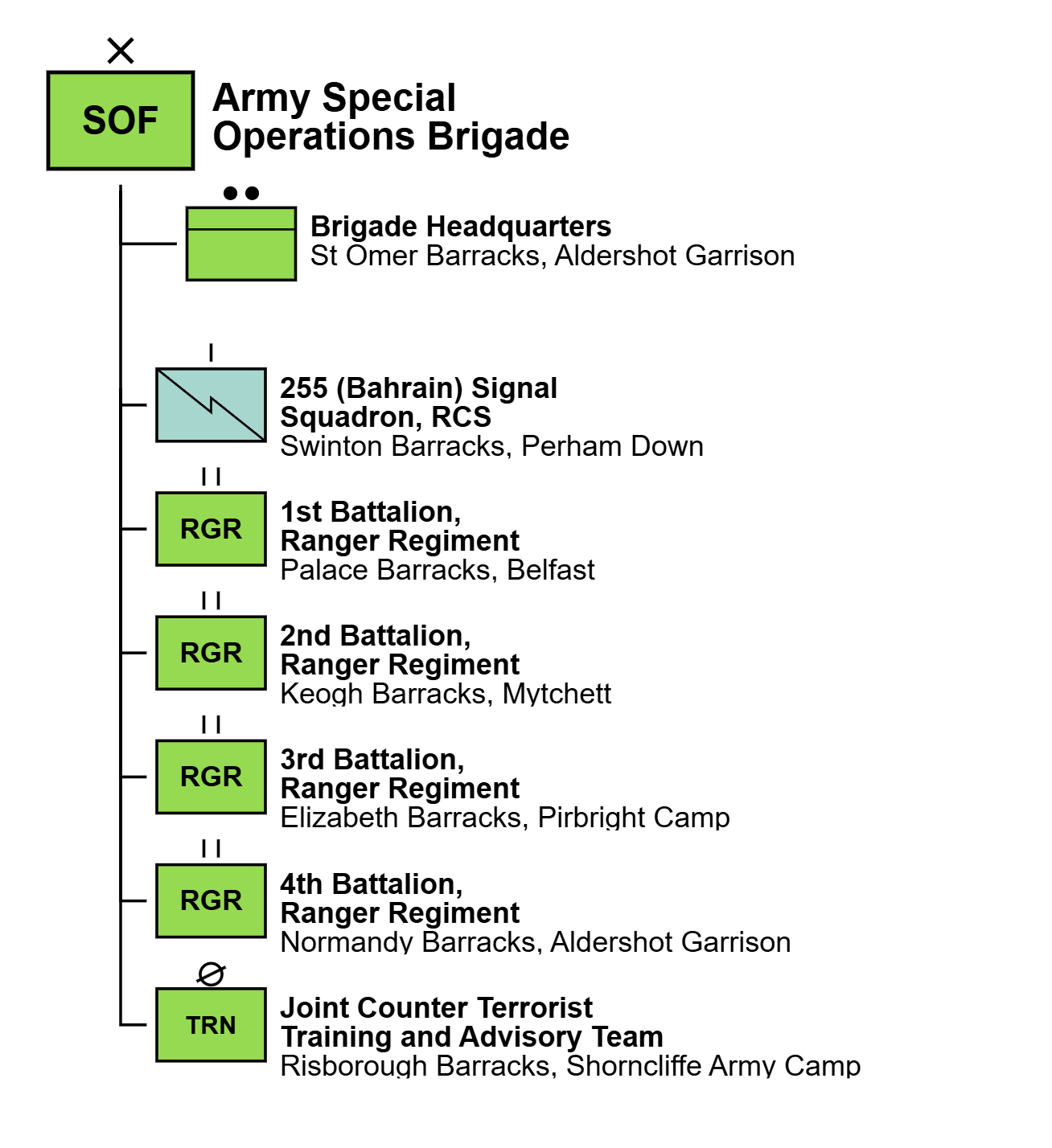
Graphic representing the structure of the new brigade.

The future structure of the brigade (by 2030) will be:

- Brigade Headquarters at Saint Omer Barracks, Aldershot Garrison
  - 255 Signal Squadron, Royal Corps of Signals, at Swinton Barracks, Perham Down (Aldershot from 2027)
  - 1st Battalion, Ranger Regiment (1 RANGER), at Palace Barracks, Belfast
    - A (Krithia) Company, The Royal Gurkha Rifles
  - 2nd Battalion, Ranger Regiment (2 RANGER), at Keogh Barracks, Mytchett
    - F (Falklands) Company, The Royal Gurkha Rifles
  - 3rd Battalion, Ranger Regiment (3 RANGER), at Elizabeth Barracks, Pirbright Camp
  - 4th Battalion, Ranger Regiment (4 RANGER), at Normandy Barracks, Aldershot Garrison
    - G (Coriano) Company, The Royal Gurkha Rifles
  - Joint Counter Terrorist Training and Advisory Team, at Risborough Barracks, Shorncliffe Army Camp
  - 1 Squadron, Honourable Artillery Company will provide Special Patrols to the Brigade.
