= Land Special Operations Force =

Formation of the British Army

- Active: 1 December 2023 – present
- Country: United Kingdom
- Branch: British Army

The Land Special Operations Force (Land SOF or LSOF) is subordinate to Commander Field Army.

== Structure ==
The LSOF is commanded by a Major General and originally comprised 11th Brigade, 77 Brigade, and the Army Special Operations Brigade. 77 Brigade and HQ Army Special Operations Brigade were subsequently disbanded.

In a subsequent Freedom of Information response, the Ministry of Defence stated that LSOF comprises the following:

- 1st Battalion, Ranger Regiment
- 2nd Battalion, Ranger Regiment
- 3rd Battalion, Ranger Regiment
- 4th Battalion, Ranger Regiment
- Joint Counter Terrorism Training & Advisory Team
- 6 Military Intelligence Battalion
- 5 Information Warfare Battalion
- 101 Information Warfare Battalion
- Honourable Artillery Company
- 4/73 Battery Royal Artillery
- 255 Signal Squadron
- 235 Electronic Warfare Signal Squadron
- LSOF Deep Strike Squadron
- Land Special Operations Training Centre

== Dress and insignia ==
Personnel serving within LSOF wear the LSOF grey beret with their parent cap badge and the LSOF flash on the left shoulder. The insignia of their unit or parent brigade is worn on the right shoulder. The four Ranger battalions, JCTTAT and 255 Signal Squadron have unit-specific authorised tactical recognition flashes. RANGER-qualified personnel also wear the RANGER qualification badge.

As of September 2026, personnel of 5 Information Warfare Battalion and 101 Information Warfare Battalion who had completed the mandated initial trade training would be authorised to wear an Information Warfare badge. The Ministry of Defence stated that the design had not yet been formally endorsed, but that the intention was for it to become a new tactical recognition flash.
