= Alfred Oliver Pollard =

Recipient of the Victoria Cross

Captain Alfred Oliver Pollard VC MC* DCM
- Born: 4 May 1893; Wallington, Surrey
- Died: 5 December 1960 (aged 67); Bournemouth, Dorset
- Military career
- Allegiance: United Kingdom
- Branch: British Army; Royal Air Force
- Rank: Captain
- Units: Honourable Artillery Company
- Conflicts: World War I
- Awards: Victoria Cross; Military Cross & Bar; Distinguished Conduct Medal
- Other work: Author

Alfred Oliver Pollard, VC, MC & Bar, DCM (4 May 1893 – 4 December 1960) was an English recipient of the Victoria Cross (VC), the highest and most prestigious award for gallantry in the face of the enemy that can be awarded to British and Commonwealth forces. He later became a prolific author of crime and mystery books, usually credited as Captain A. O. Pollard.

== Military service ==
Pollard was born in Wallington, Surrey, and was educated at St. Olave's Grammar School and Merchant Taylors' School, 1906–1908. He had volunteered for service in the British Army on 8 August 1914, enlisting in the Honourable Artillery Company (HAC). Up to that date, he had worked as a clerk at an insurance company.

He spent most of the First World War on the Western Front and was twice wounded, on both occasions returning to his unit after recovering. In September 1915 while a sergeant, he received the Distinguished Conduct Medal (DCM) for bravery in Sanctuary Wood, in the Ypres Salient. In January 1916 he was commissioned as a second lieutenant in the Honourable Artillery Company, twice earning the Military Cross (MC) before he was awarded the VC for the following action:

"On 29 April 1917 at Gavrelle, France, the troops of various units had become disorganised owing to the heavy casualties from shell fire and a subsequent determined attack with very strong forces caused further confusion and retirement. Second Lieutenant Pollard realised the seriousness of the situation and with only four men he started a counter-attack with bombs, pressing it home until he had broken the enemy attack and regained all that had been lost and much ground in addition. This officer's splendid example inspired courage into every man who saw him."

Pollard's bravery during the war earned him the highest (and largest number of) awards to a soldier in his unit. He received his VC and MC and bar at Buckingham Palace on 21 July 1917.

His Victoria Cross is held by the Honourable Artillery Company in London, with a copy on display in its Medal Room.

== Post 1918 ==
After the war, Pollard found it hard to settle and took a variety of jobs. In June 1924 he entered the Royal Air Force as a pilot, but resigned as a flying officer in December 1926. He then became a professional writer, including an autobiography, Fire-Eater: the Memoirs of a VC published in 1932, which recounts his experience of the war, from joining the HAC on the outbreak of war up to the armistice. It depicts a man who was able to deal with the violence and huge loss of life by rationalising it as a necessary evil to destroy the enemy. His other works – about 60 over three decades – were mainly mystery, murder or spy novels. He also worked as a columnist for a number of London and provincial newspapers and undertook some broadcasting for BBC radio.

According to the author John Lewis-Stempel post-war, Pollard attempted to pawn his VC in apparent disillusionment. There is no citation for this in the book.

Pollard died aged 67 on 5 December 1960 in Bournemouth, where he was cremated at Bournemouth Crematorium.

== Family ==
His elder brother, Frank, was also a member of the HAC but, when he believed he would not be sent to the front, deserted and joined the Grenadier Guards. He was killed in action in September 1916, just before he was to be sent back to England on an officers' commissioning course.

In 1918, Pollard married Mary Ainsley of Trefilan, Purley, the marriage ended in divorce in 1924. In September 1925 he married Violet Irene Swarbrick. There were no children by either marriage.

== Works ==
From British Library catalogue (Accessed August 2010).

- Rum Alley (1931)
- Murder. Hide-and-Seek (1931)
- Fire-Eater. The memoirs of a VC (1932)
- The Death Flight (1932)
- The Cipher Five (1932)
- The Havenhurst Affair (1933)
- The Riddle of Loch Lemman (1933)
- The Royal Air Force. A concise history ... With 24 illustrations (1934)
- The Phantom 'Plane (1934)
- The Secret of Castle Voxzel (1935)
- The Boy's Romance of Aviation. (1935)
- Murder in the Air (1935)
- The Death Game (1936)
- Unofficial Spy (1936)
- Romantic Stories of Air Heroes (1937)
- The Murder Germ (1937)
- Hidden Cypher (1937)
- Air Reprisal (1938)
- Black Out (1938)
- Flanders Spy (1938)
- The Secret Formula (1939)
- Murder of a Diplomat (1939)
- The Boys Romance of Aviation...New Edition Revised (1939)
- The Secret Pact (1940)
- Leaders of the Royal Air Force (1940)
- Epic Deeds of the R.A.F. (1940)
- A.R.P. Spy (1940)
- Bombers Over the Reich. [Account of the work of the R.A.F., Bomber Command and the Fleet Air Arm]. (1941)
- The Secret Weapon (1941)
- Wanted by the Gestapo (1942)
- The Death Squadron (1943)
- Invitation to Death (1944)
- Gestapo Fugitive (1944)
- The Fifth Freedom (1945)
- Blood Hunt (1946)
- Double-Cross (1946)
- A Deal in Death (1947)
- The Iron Curtain (1947)
- The Death Game (1947)
- The Murder Germ (1947)
- The Death Curse (1948)
- David Wilshaw, Air Detective, Investigates (1949)
- Dead Man's Secret (1949)
- The Secret Vendetta (1949)
- Red Hazard (1950)
- The Poisoned Pilot (1950)
- The Golden Budda (David Wilshaw Investigates) (1951)
- Death Intervened (1951)
- The Death Parade (1951)
- The Dead Forger (1952)
- Counterfeit Spy (1952)
- The Buckled Wing (David Wilshaw Investigates) (1953)
- Criminal Airman (1953)
- Homicidal Spy (1954)
- The Missing Diamond (1955)
- Sinister Secret (1956)
- Smuggler's Buoy (1958)
- The Secret Pact (1958)
- Wrong Verdict (1960)
- Forged Evidence (1962)
