= Honourable Artillery Company =

Oldest regiment of the British Army

- Crest and motto of the Honourable Artillery Company
- Active: 1087; chartered 25 August 1537
- Allegiance: United Kingdom
- Branch: British Army
- Role: Infantry (1537–1973); Artillery (1780–2005); Light Cavalry (1861–1890); Surveillance and target acquisition (1973–2026); Special Operations (2026–date); Parachute artillery (2017–date)
- Size: One regiment; 470 personnel
- Part of: Land Special Operations Force
- Garrison/HQ: London
- Mottos: Arma pacis fulcra (Latin: "Armed Strength for Peace") (Note: A loose translation, more literally "Arms (hold the) balance of peace")
- March: Quick – The British Grenadiers; Slow – The Duke of York; Canter – Bonnie Dundee; Trot – The Keel Row; Walk – The Duchess of Kent

Commanders
- Captain General: Charles III
- Royal Honorary Colonel: Prince Michael of Kent
- Colonel Commandant: General Sir Roland Walker
- Notable commanders: Lieutenant Colonel Sir Edward Heath; General Sir Richard O'Connor

Insignia
- Tactical Recognition Flash: Only worn by Corps of Drums
- Plume: None (Bearskin cap)
- Abbreviation: HAC

The Honourable Artillery Company (HAC) is the reserve regiment in the British Army's Land Special Operations Force. Incorporated by royal charter in 1537 by King Henry VIII, it is the oldest regiment in the British Army and is considered the second-oldest military unit in the world. Today, it is also a charity whose purpose is to attend to the "better defence of the realm", primarily through supporting the HAC regiment. The word "artillery" in "Honourable Artillery Company" does not have the current meaning that is generally associated with it, but dates from a time when in the English language that word meant any projectile, for example arrows shot from a bow. The equivalent form of words in modern English would be either "Honourable Infantry Company" (Note: "Infantry" today is closer to the meaning of "artillery" then than is "military" because "military" includes in its scope today's usage of "artillery" and also mounted troops, whereas "infantry", like the HAC when founded, did not include these.) or "Honourable Military Company".

In the 17th century, its members played a significant part in the formation of both the Royal Marines and the Grenadier Guards. More recently, regiments, battalions and batteries of the Company fought with distinction in both World Wars and its current regiment, which forms part of the Army Reserve contribution to the Land Special Operations Force, is the oldest surviving regiment in the British Army, and the second most senior in the Army Reserve. (Note: After the Royal Monmouthshire Royal Engineers (Militia). Reserve units take precedence after regular units.) Members of the regiment are drawn, for the most part, from young men and women working in and around the City and Greater London. Those leaving the active units may become Veteran Members and remain within the fraternity of the company.

== History ==
=== Early history ===
"The British Grenadiers"
"The British Grenadiers", the official Regimental Quick March of the Honourable Artillery Company, performed by the United States Army Band Strings ensemble

The HAC can trace its history back as far as 1087, but it received a royal charter from Henry VIII on 25 August 1537, when Letters Patent were received by the Overseers of the Fraternity or Guild of St George authorising them to establish a perpetual corporation for the defence of the realm to be known as the Fraternity or Guild of Artillery of Longbows, Crossbows and Handgonnes. This body was known by a variety of names until 1658, when it was first referred to as the Artillery Company. It was initially referred to as the Honourable Artillery Company in 1685 and officially received the name from Queen Victoria in 1860. However, the Archers' Company of the Honourable Artillery Company was retained into the late 19th century, though as a private club. Founded in 1781 by Sir Ashton Lever, it met at Archers' Hall, Inner Circle, Regent's Park, London. The Archers' Company remained a part of the regiment operated from 1784 to the late 1790s, along with Matross, Grenadier (established on 11 August 1686) and Light Infantry companies/divisions, with a Rifle or Yager Company introduced around 1803.

The regiment has the rare distinction of having fought on the side of both Parliament and the Royalists during the English Civil War 1642 to 1649. From its formation, the Company trained at a site it had occupied at the Old Artillery Ground in Spitalfields and at the Merchant Taylors' Company Hall. In 1622, the Company built its first Armoury House at the site of the Old Artillery Gardens.

In 1638, Sir Maurice Abbot granted the Company use of lands at its current site south of Bunhill Fields Burial Ground on City Road, which in 1649 consisted of twelve acres enclosed by a brick wall and pale. In 1657, it sold its old Armoury House in Spitalfield to Master Gunner Richard Woolaston for £300. In 1656, the Grenadier Guards were formed from gentlemen of the Honourable Artillery Company who had taken the then heir to the throne, Prince Charles (later Charles II), to Europe for his safety during the English Civil War.

On 28 October 1664, in the New Artillery Gardens, the body of men that would become the Royal Marines was first formed with an initial strength of 1,200 infantrymen recruited from the London Trained Bands as part of the mobilisation for the Second Anglo-Dutch War. James (later King James VII & II), the Duke of York and Albany, Lord High Admiral and brother of King Charles II, was Captain-General of the Honourable Artillery Company, the unit that trained the Trained Bands.

1798 engraving of a regimental private

1890 painting of a regimental cavalryman

The Company served in Broadgate during the Gordon Riots of 1780 and in gratitude for its role in restoring order to the city, the Corporation of London presented "two brass field-pieces", which led to the creation of an HAC Artillery Division. (These guns are on display in the entrance hall of Armoury House.) In 1860, control of the company moved from the Home Office to the War Office and in 1889, a Royal Warrant gave the Secretary of State for War control of the company's military affairs. In 1883, Queen Victoria decreed that the HAC took precedence next after the Regular Forces and therefore before the Militia and Yeomanry in consideration of its antiquity.

=== South Africa 1900–1902 ===
Members of the Company first served as a formed unit overseas in the South African War (1899–1902). Almost two hundred members served; the majority in the City of London Imperial Volunteers (CIV) as infantry, mounted infantry and in a Field Battery that was officered, and for the most part manned, by members of the company.

=== Territorial and Reserve Forces Act 1907 ===
In 1907, the Company became part of the newly formed Territorial Force with the passing of the Territorial and Reserve Forces Act. The HAC Infantry was due to become part of the newly formed London Regiment as the "26th (County of London) Battalion", but instead managed to retain its own identity as the Honourable Artillery Company Infantry Battalion. The HAC also had its property and privileges protected by the Honourable Artillery Company Act 1908.

=== First World War ===
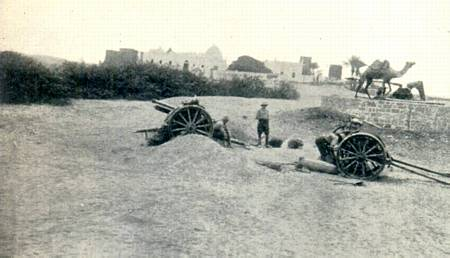
A QF 15 pounder of B Battery, Honourable Artillery Company, at Sheik Othman, Aden.

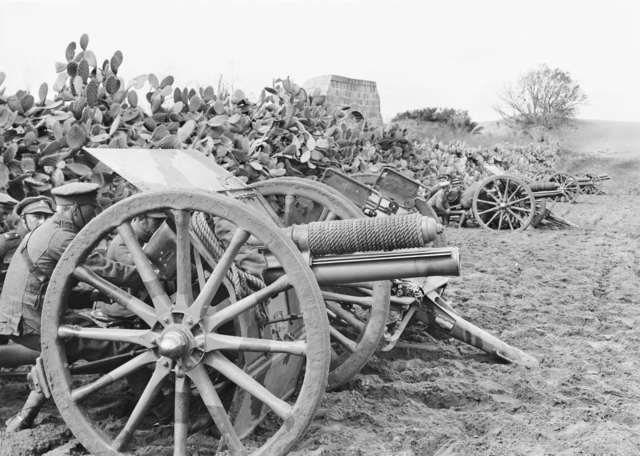
Gunners of A Battery, the Honourable Artillery Company, attached to the 4th Australian Light Horse Brigade, crouch between their 13 pounder quick fire field guns and a cactus hedge near Belah, Palestine, in March 1918.

The HAC expanded to three infantry battalions and seven artillery batteries during the First World War. Second Lieutenants Reginald Leonard Haine and Alfred Oliver Pollard, of the 1st Battalion HAC, were awarded Victoria Crosses for their actions at Gavrelle in 1917. In total 1,650 men from the HAC were killed during the war.

In September 1914, the 1st Battalion followed the British Expeditionary Force to France and fought in the 1st Battle of Ypres. After the fighting at the Battle of the Ancre in 1916 and the Battle of Arras in 1917, it became an officer training battalion and provided demonstration platoons. Elements of the battalion were used to help quell the Étaples Mutiny. The 2nd Battalion HAC was raised in August 1914; it was in France by October 1916 and in action on 25 February 1917 at Bucquoy. They fought at the Battle of Arras in May and the 3rd Battle of Ypres in October. In November 1917, the battalion moved to the Italian Front under the command of Lieutenant-Colonel Sir Richard O'Connor. In the Battle of Vittorio Veneto, in October 1918, they led a force of Italians, Americans and British that compelled the garrison of the strategic island of Papadopoli (in the main channel of the River Piave) to surrender. For this remarkable feat of arms, the HAC was awarded two Distinguished Service Orders, five Military Crosses, three Distinguished Conduct Medals and 29 Military Medals.

Both A Battery and B Battery went to Suez in April 1915. In July, B Battery fought in the recapture of Sheikh Othman (key to the water supply to Aden) from the Turks as part of the Aden campaign. In February 1917, both batteries took part in the Palestine Campaign, were in action at the First and Second Battle of Gaza and entered Jerusalem in December 1917. In the German counter-attack during the Second action of Es Salt on 1 May 1918, A Battery was forced to make a rapid withdrawal under heavy fire, which resulted in the loss of all its guns. Both A and B Batteries took part in the Battle of Megiddo in September.

The 2nd Line batteries – 2/A Battery and 2/B Battery – were formed in 1914 and served on the Western Front in 1917 and 1918 as part of an Army Field Artillery Brigade; the 3rd Line batteries – A (Reserve) Battery and B (Reserve) Battery – were formed in 1915 to provide trained replacements for the 1st and 2nd Line batteries.

A seventh battery, the 309th (HAC) Siege Battery RGA, went to France in April 1917 and saw action at the Battle of Messines and the Battle of Amiens.

In 1919, Lieutenant-Colonel Edward Lisle Strutt, arranged for a detachment of the 2nd Battalion to form a Guard of Honour at Imst Station to give a final Royal Salute on the departure of the Imperial State Train for Charles I, the last Austro-Hungarian Emperor-King, to safety in Switzerland, after having served as the family's protector at Eckartsau on the personal initiative of King George V.

=== Interwar ===
When the Territorial Force was reconstituted as the Territorial Army (TA) in 1920, the HAC infantry battalion was reformed, while A and B Batteries formed a composite RHA unit with the City of London Yeomanry (Rough Riders) (one battery) as 11th (HAC and City of London Yeomanry) Brigade, RHA. The TA began to expand rapidly at the time of the Munich Crisis in 1938, and the Yeomanry left to form a separate light anti-aircraft regiment leaving 11th Regiment RHA (HAC). Subsequently, the HAC formed the 12th (1939) and 13th Regiments RHA (HAC) (1940) and the 86th (HAC) Heavy Anti-Aircraft Regiment (1939).

=== Second World War ===
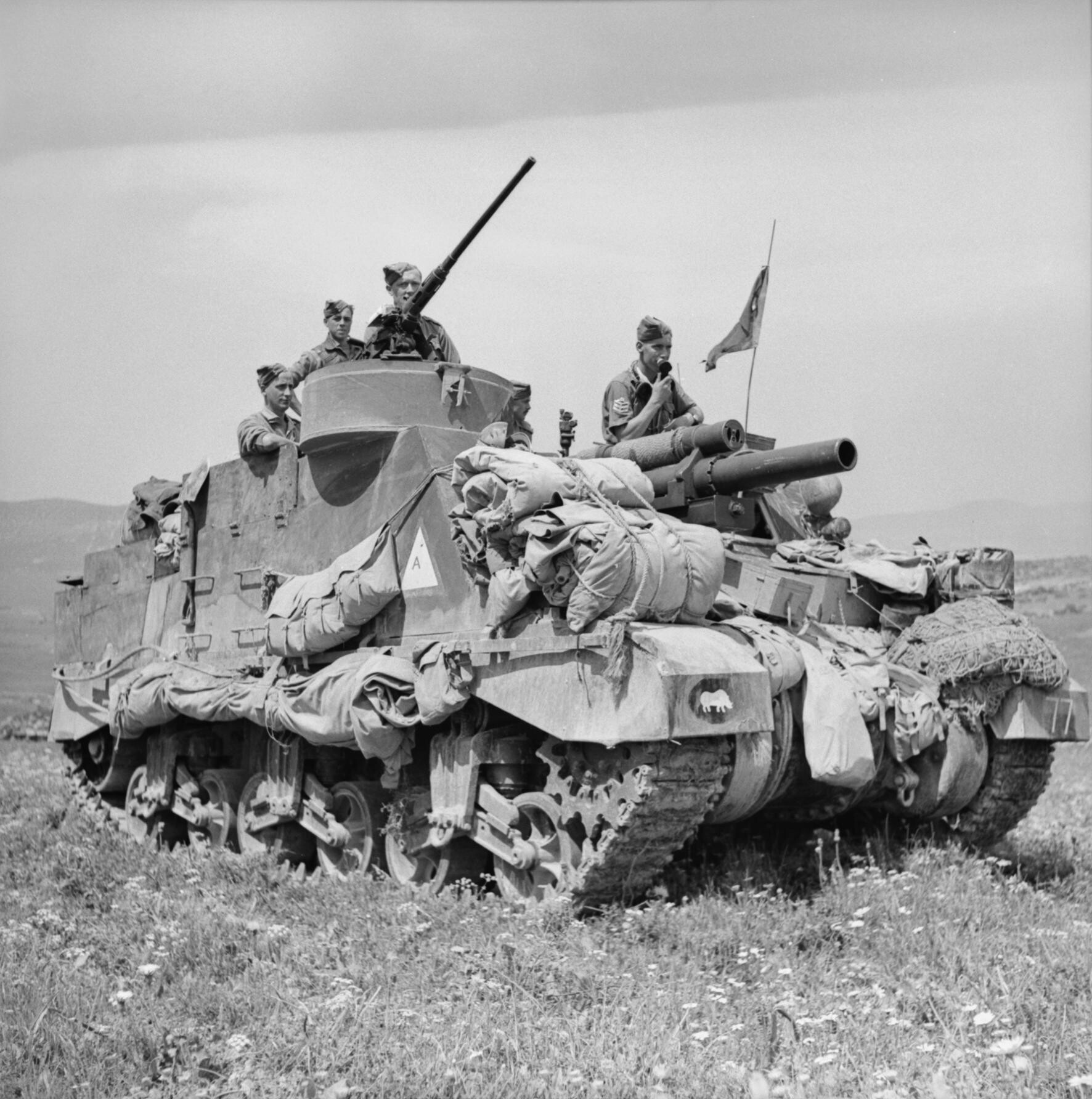
An M7 Priest of the 11th (HAC) Regiment Royal Horse Artillery in Tunisia, 1943.

==== Infantry Battalion ====
In 1939, the Infantry Battalion became 162 (HAC) Officer Cadet Training Unit, this was the Officer Training Unit of the Reconnaissance Corps. In 1942, 101 RAC OCTU amalgamated with 162 Reconnaissance Corps OCTU to form 100 RAC OCTU based at the Royal Military College, Sandhurst.

==== 11th (HAC) Regiment, RHA ====
The 11th (HAC) Regiment RHA served in North Africa at the Battle of Knightsbridge with 25-pounder guns and, after re-equipping with the M7 Priest self-propelled gun, in the Second Battle of El Alamein where it was commanded by Bill Leggatt. The regiment's guns were the first guns ashore in the invasion of Sicily; then they took part in the Allied invasion of Italy and the Italian Campaign.

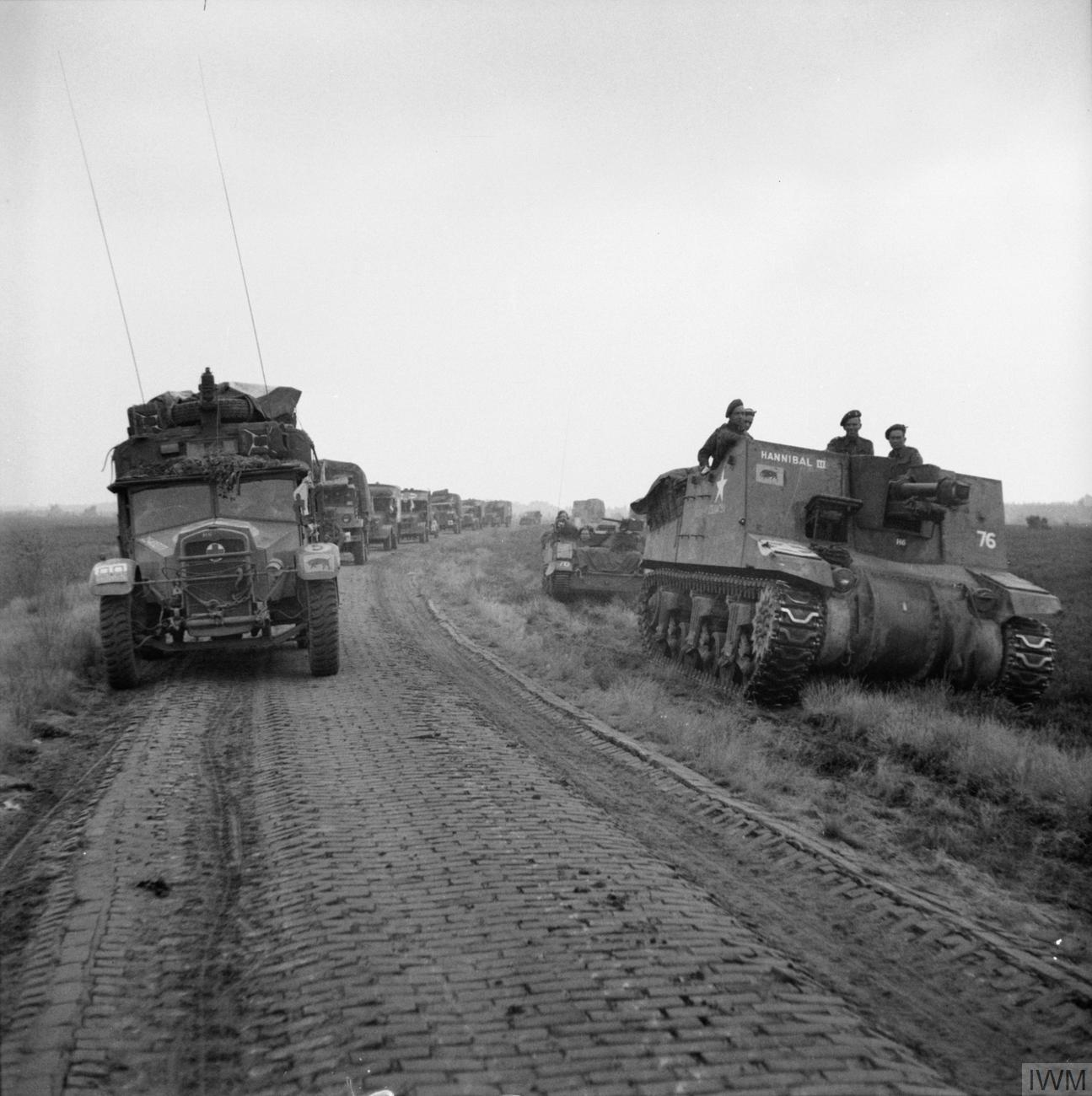
11th Armoured Division vehicles during the advance in Holland, 22 September 1944. On the right is a Sexton self-propelled gun of 13th (HAC) Regiment Royal Horse Artillery.

==== 12th (HAC) Regiment, RHA ====
The 12th (HAC) Regiment RHA took part in the Operation Torch landings and were in action at Thala in February 1943, where they halted a German advance following the Battle of the Kasserine Pass. After re-equipping with Priests, they too moved on to Italy in March 1944 and fought at Monte Cassino.

==== 13th (HAC) Regiment, RHA ====
The 13th (HAC) Regiment RHA equipped with Sexton self-propelled guns fought in Normandy, the Netherlands and across the Rhine into Germany as part of 11th Armoured Division.

==== 86th (HAC) HAA Regiment, RA ====
The regiment formed part of 26th (London) Anti-Aircraft Brigade defending the London Inner Artillery Zone. Anti-Aircraft Command mobilised on 24 August 1939, and so 86th (HAC) HAA Rgt was already manning static gunsites at places like Primrose Hill and Finsbury Park when war was declared on 3 September. The regiment served in the defence of the capital throughout The Blitz. It became a mobile unit in 1942 and was one of the first units to land on D-Day, with Regimental Headquarters commanding a composite AA Assault Group on Juno Beach. During the Normandy Campaign and subsequent advance into Belgium the regiment's 3.7-inch HAA guns were sometimes used to engage ground targets. During the winter of 1944–45 its guns and radar defended Brussels and Antwerp against V-1 flying bombs (known as 'Divers').

Over seven hundred members of the Company lost their lives during the Second World War.

=== Post-war ===
In 1947, the Company was reorganised as follows:

- Infantry battalion
- 1st Regiment HAC, RHA, of self-propelled artillery (from 11th (HAC) RHA Regiment)
- 2nd Regiment HAC (HAA) of heavy anti-aircraft artillery (from 86th (HAC) HAA Regiment; disbanded 1955)
- G Locating Battery (from 12th (HAC) RHA Regiment; disbanded 1961)

In 1973, the Regiment was reorganised again. It was given the role of providing 'stay behind' observation posts (OPs) for the British Army of the Rhine as one of the three Territorial Army units making up the Corps Patrol Unit (alongside 21 and 23 SAS). The three sabre squadrons, each consisting of four- to six-man patrols, provided surveillance and target acquisition capabilities to the headquarters of 1st Artillery Brigade (HQ Sqn HAC), 1st Armoured Division (I Sqn HAC), 4th Armoured Division (II Sqn HAC), and 1 BR Corps (III Sqn HAC). The new structure was:

- Three patrol squadrons (1, 2 and 3, or I, II and III) – a fourth patrol squadron was formed for a short period in the 1980s
- Headquarters Squadron, including Training Wing and Medical Wing
- The Gun Troop (a battery of six 25-pounder guns and not part of the OP role)
- The band and the Corps of Drums

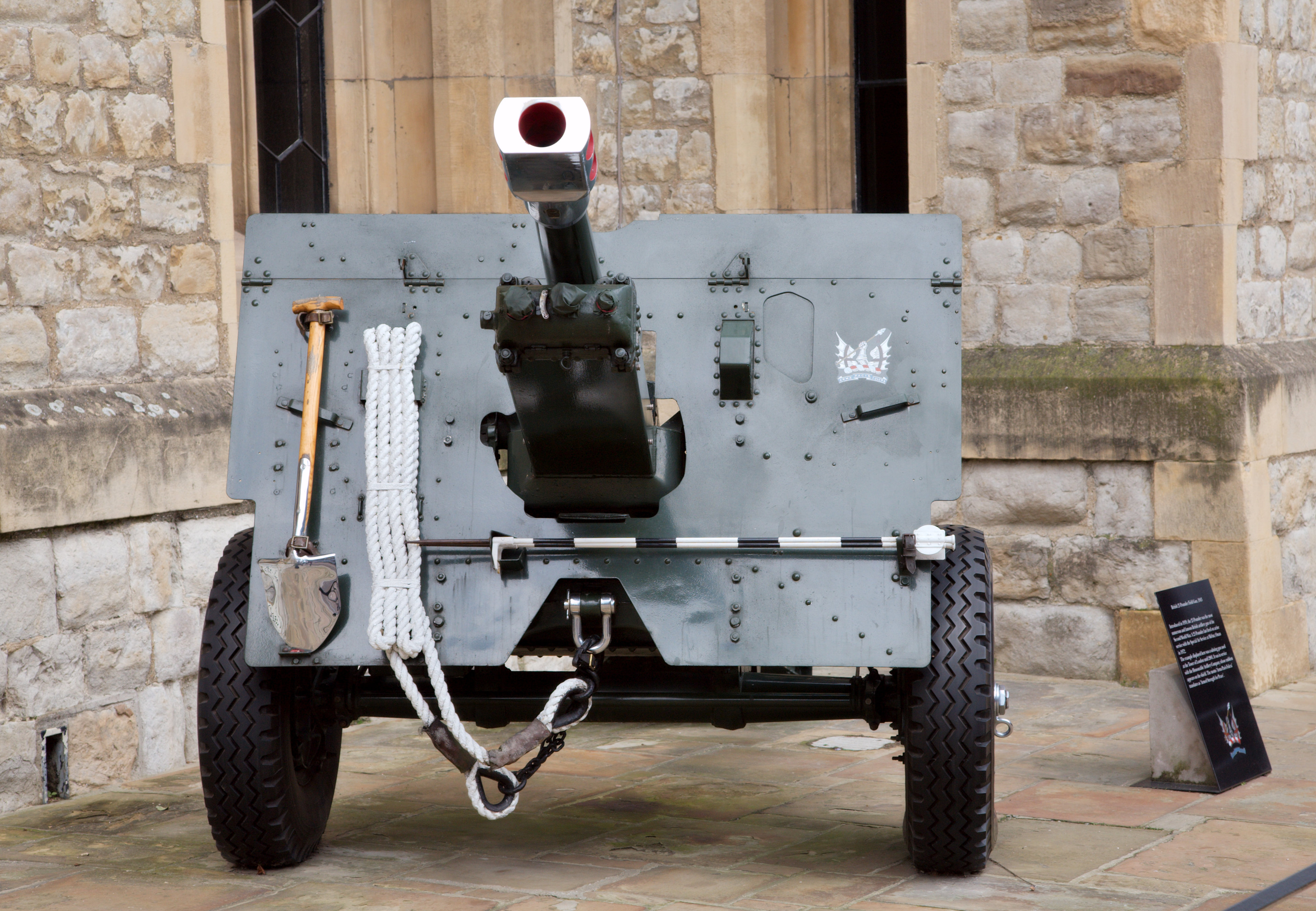
A former HAC 25-pounder gun, preserved at the Tower of London

In 1992, the signals troops that had been integrated into the patrol squadrons were brought together to form the Signal Squadron; they were subsequently re-integrated with the patrol squadrons in 2010. In 1992, on Salisbury Plain, the HAC was the last British Army unit to fire the 25-pounder in the field as the Gun Troop retrained onto the 105 mm Light Gun. The 25-pounder continued to be fired ceremonially until it was replaced by the Light Gun.

In 1996, the first formed unit of the Regiment to be mobilised for active service since the Second World War was called up for Operation Resolute with the NATO IFOR in Bosnia and Herzegovina. The regiment participated in the celebration of the Queen's Golden Jubilee on 4 June 2002 by firing a 62-gun salute at the Tower of London, and by providing a Guard of Honour (including the Regimental Band and the Massed Corps of Drums of the 1st Bn Grenadier Guards and the HAC) at St Paul's Cathedral. In December of that year, the Captain-General visited and dined with the Company to commemorate her Golden Jubilee as Captain-General.

In 2005, the guns were withdrawn from Gun Troop, which was renamed Liaison Troop.

In 2006, the HAC was the first major unit of the Territorial Army to convert to the Bowman communications system. When Bowman was temporarily withdrawn from the Territorial Army in 2008/09, the HAC was one of the few units to retain the equipment.

In 2016, Queen Elizabeth II became the longest-serving Captain-General of the HAC, surpassing 64 years of service.

In 2017, A Battery (1st City of London) Honourable Artillery Company was re-formed to provide gunners in support of 7th Parachute Regiment Royal Horse Artillery.

In 2026 the Regiment less A Battery was transferred to the Land Special Operations Force. Lance Corporal Grace Cussons of the HAC became first female reservist to pass All Arms Pre-Parachute Selection.

== Current role and organisation ==
=== Current role ===
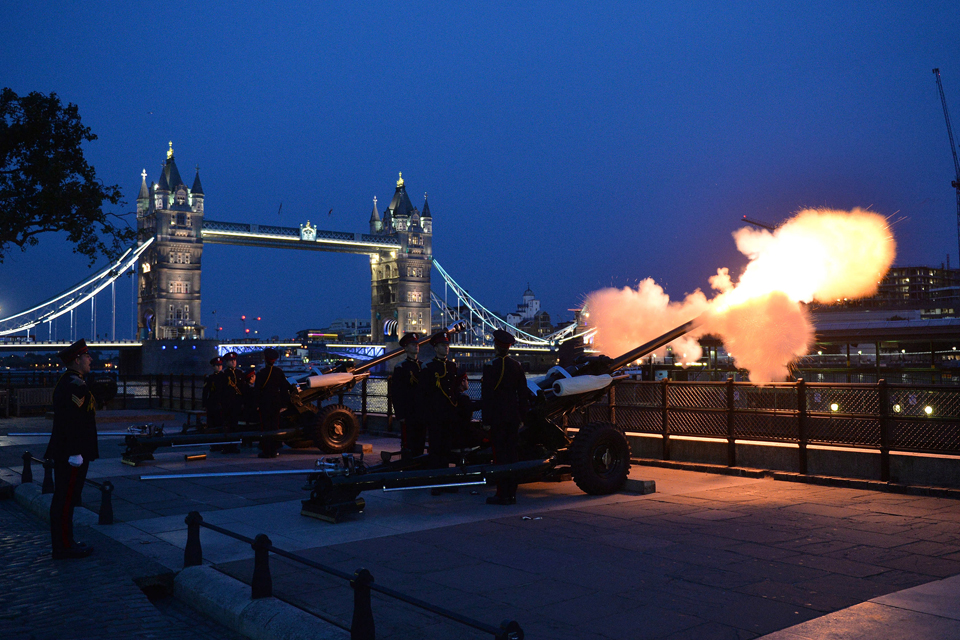
The HAC on duty at the Tower of London: firing minute guns to mark the centenary of the start of World War I.

The HAC has a role within the Land Special Operations Force.

The HAC also has a ceremonial role in providing guards of honour at the Guildhall in the City of London during state visits and, since 1924 (when the Royal Artillery ceased to be stationed at the Tower), has provided the saluting battery at the Tower of London for state occasions.

=== Training ===
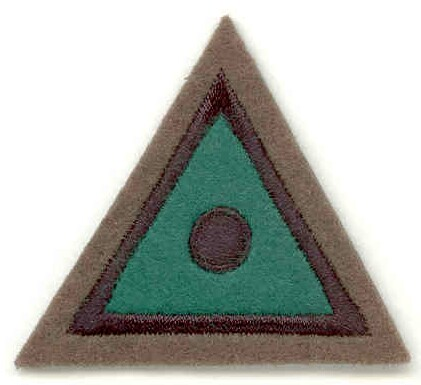
Special Observer Badge, worn by Soldiers who have passed the SR Patrol Course

The HAC is one of two Army Reserve units (the other being the Parachute Regiment) to deliver its own Phase 1 training, to a more demanding standard than that provided by most Army Reserve units. Unlike most Army Reserve units, which are required to train only to sub-unit (company or squadron) level, the HAC is required to train at regimental level.

Those wishing to serve in 1 Squadron are required to undertake the Surveillance and Reconnaissance Patrols Course (SRPC), an arduous course with a 10% pass rate. Service as a Special Observer qualifies personnel for additional pay and specialist courses and is open to personnel from all arms and services. In 2026, only six of the 50 personnel who started the course passed, this was described as the "most successful SRPC (Special Recce Patrol Course) (R) recorded".

=== Organisation ===
The HAC is not part of the Royal Regiment of Artillery, being an older and separate regiment with its own uniform, insignia and colours. As there is no regular HAC its permanent staff instructors are drawn from across the armed forces including from the Foot Guards and SAS. The regiment forms part of the Land Special Operations Force (having previously been part of 1st Intelligence Surveillance and Reconnaissance Brigade then 77th Brigade) with A Battery supporting 16 Air Assault Brigade Combat Team. Prior to the move to Land Special Operations Force, the sub units of the HAC were:

- Headquarters Squadron.
  - The Corps of Drums. The last remaining sub-unit from the infantry battalions and still wearing the grenade beret badge, Foot Guards belt, beret badge backing and tactical recognition flash. As with an infantry battalion corps of drums, the drummers are 'soldiers first' and regularly deploy soldiers on operations as well as fulfilling their ceremonial role. The Corps of Drums forms part of HQ Squadron and is a separate entity from the Band, who are primarily musicians. They provide personnel for A Battery whilst still maintaining their ceremonial drumming role.
  - The Medical Wing, commanded by the Surgeon Major, who is a Royal Army Medical Service officer, provides medical support to the Regiment for peacetime training and on deployment. Combat medical technicians within the Medical Wing undergo additional specialist medical training with the Defence Medical Services.
  - CIS Troop, a troop to provide communications information systems capability to the HAC and other units.
  - Sicily Troop. The enablers of the Regiment, providing logistics and motorised capability to the HAC and other units.
- A (1st City of London) Battery, Honourable Artillery Company, a battery of 105mm light guns.
- 1 Squadron (Special Operations), comprising two troops of surveillance and reconnaissance patrols. 1 Squadron provides long-range surveillance, reconnaissance and a joint-fires capability as formed surveillance and target acquisition patrols to support the Army Special Operations Brigade, following the Integrated Review, 2021.
- 2 Squadron, composed of a squadron headquarters, and three troops (Knightsbridge, El Hamma and El Alamein) of light ISR Detachments.
- III Squadron, composed of a squadron headquarters, and three troops (Aden, Gaza and Rhine) of light ISR Detachments.

In 2026, 2 and III Squadrons were conducting helicopter reconnaissance, mapping tasks and partner-force integration, supplying trained Human Terrain Analysts to operations in Kosovo, the UK and the USA, and delivering substantial specialist output in intelligence, PSYOPS, reconnaissance and irregular warfare.

Under the Future Soldier programme, A Battery provided two guns to each battery of 7 (Para) RHA and 1 Squadron provided Special Patrols to the Army Special Operations Brigade.

== Operations ==
The Regiment has had individuals or sub-units on active service at all times since 1996; with the personnel serving in a wide variety of roles in Northern Ireland, Bosnia, Kosovo, Iraq, Afghanistan and various countries in Africa. Commitments included the deployment of individuals to human intelligence roles in the Balkans (including as part of Joint Commission Observer teams) and then formed patrols to Bosnia, Kosovo and Iraq; independent sub-units to Operation Telic 4 and 5 in Iraq and L Troop to Operation Telic 9; as well as individual and group reinforcements to other infantry and artillery units. In Afghanistan, deployed personnel were divided between operating and maintaining counter indirect fire systems and other high technology equipment and forming part of the Brigade Reconnaissance Force (BRF).

On Tuesday 4 December 2007, Trooper Jack Sadler, who was serving with the BRF, was killed when his vehicle was hit by a blast north of Sangin, in Helmand Province. Two other soldiers were injured in the attack. In 2008, the Runner-up for the Cobra Trophy for Volunteer Reservist of the year was Trooper Adam Cocks of 2 Squadron, who was severely injured in Afghanistan when his vehicle struck a mine. While recuperating at Headley Court rehabilitation centre, he and a friend came up with the idea of a rugby match at Twickenham to help raise money for the charity Help for Heroes.

== Regimental museum ==
The Honourable Artillery Company Museum is located at Armoury House.

== Dress ==
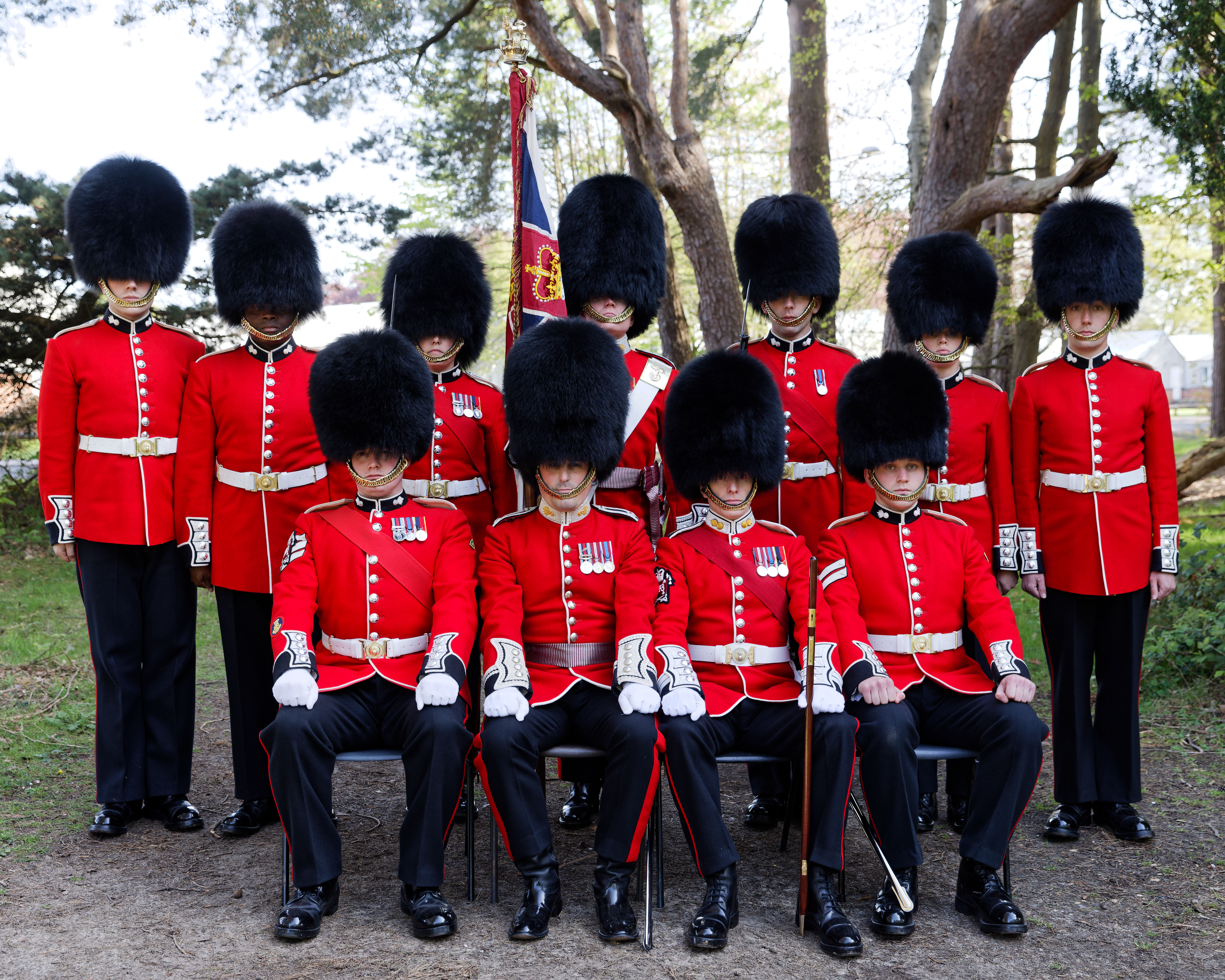
A contingent from the Honourable Artillery Company which paraded as part of the Coronation of Charles III and Camilla. For this occasion, the full dress uniform of the regiment was worn, which is otherwise rarely worn by the regiment outside the Band and Corps of Drums.

In 1830, King William IV ordered that the uniform of the HAC should be based on that of the Grenadier Guards, except that where the Grenadiers wear gold, the HAC were to wear silver. This tradition is continued today by the wearing of the silver coloured grenade in the forage cap similar to the brass one of the Grenadiers, and the buttons and lace on HAC dress uniforms being silver coloured instead of gold.

=== Berets ===
Until May 2026, the HAC wore a khaki beret with the HAC's beret badge ("short arms") in white metal on a black backing. Officers and warrant officers wore an embroidered cloth version of the same badge. The Corps of Drums and Regimental Band wore the HAC infantry grenade on a blue red blue backing, which was superficially identical to that of the Grenadier Guards. In July 2008, members of 4/73 (Sphinx) Special OP Battery, part of 5th Regiment Royal Artillery, the HACs paired regular regiment, adopted the khaki beret to mark their close working relationship.

From 5 May 2026 A Battery adopted the Airborne Forces maroon beret whilst the rest of the regiment wears the gunmetal grey beret of LSOF.

Headdress badges of the HAC

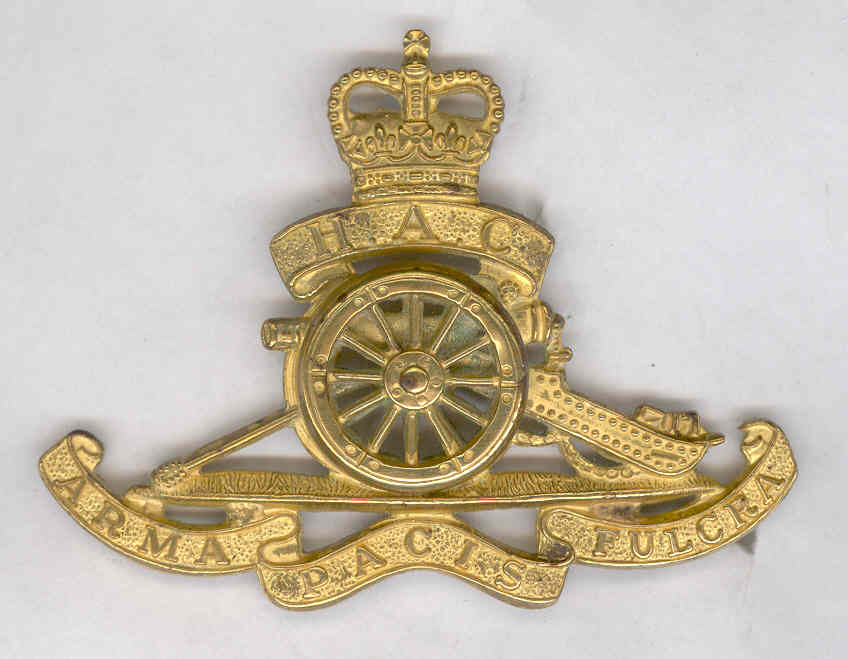
HAC Gunner Badge worn by Officers in No 1 Dress (Gunner) on artillery ceremonial duties

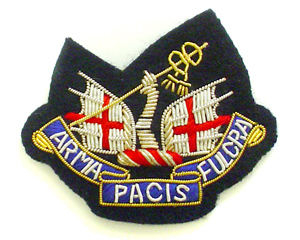
Officer's and warrant officer's beret badge

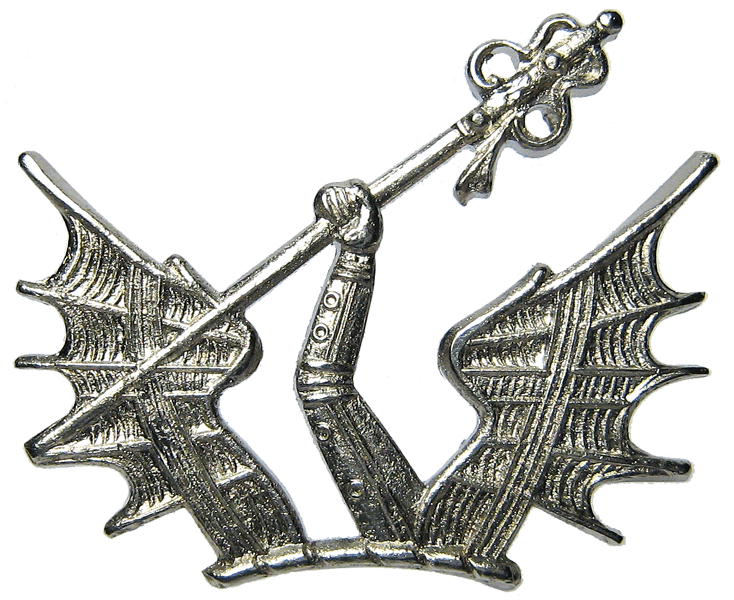
Other ranks beret badge

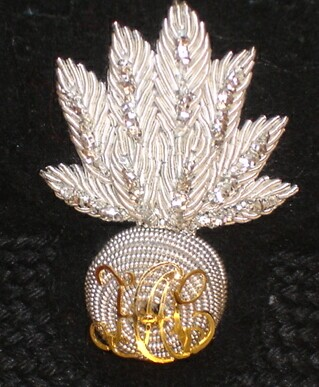
Officer's forage cap badge (Infantry)

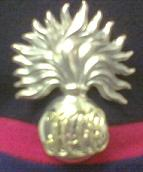
Grenade worn by SNCOs of all sub units in forage cap, and Band and Drums in the beret

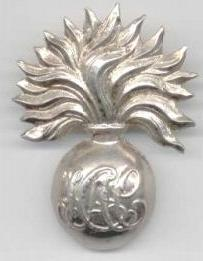
Grenade worn by ranks below sergeant in the forage cap, and by the Band and Corps of Drums in the beret

=== Other headdress ===
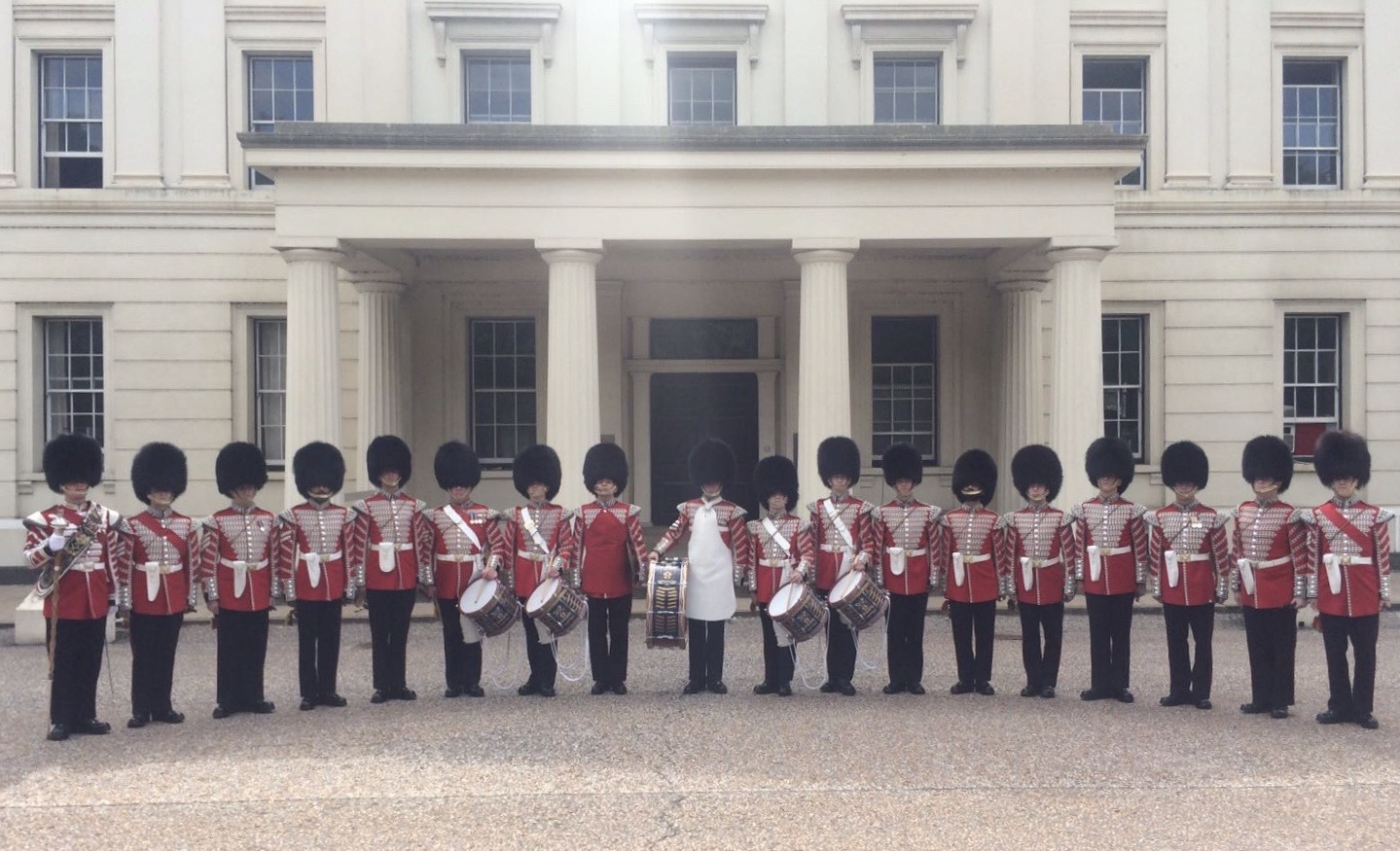
The Corps of Drums of the Honourable Artillery Company at Wellington Barracks, wearing bearskin caps.

On the forage cap, the HAC infantry grenade (white metal) is worn by junior ranks of all subunits of the regiment. Sergeants and Warrant Officers wear a different version of the grenade, which has the letters HAC in brass on the ball of the grenade. Officers wear an embroidered silver grenade on their forage caps in No 1 Dress (Infantry) and on the Service Dress forage cap but when in No 1 Dress (Gunner) they wear the HAC Artillery cap badge. The latter is similar to that of the Royal Artillery but with "HAC" and "Arma Pacis Fulcra" replacing "Ubique" and "Quo Fas et Gloria Ducunt". In Full Dress (normally only worn by the Band and Corps of Drums), the Bearskin is worn without a plume.

=== Badges of rank ===
HAC officer's rank stars. Combat, Service and Mess Dress

In No 2 dress, Soldiers wear the larger Foot Guards badges of rank and qualification. Lance Corporals wear two chevrons and Lance Sergeants three. In Full Dress and Number 1 dress, WO2's wear a large colour badge of the same pattern as the Grenadier Guards, but in silver rather than gold. Officers' crowns and stars are of the same pattern as those of the Grenadiers (Order of the Garter), woven for combat uniforms but in silver for Service and Barrack Dress.

=== Stable belts ===
Each Squadron wears a different stable belt:

- A (City of London) Battery – Light blue with narrow yellow stripe through the middle. (Identical to the Royal Horse Artillery)
- Headquarter Squadron and Band – red and blue edged with narrow yellow stripes
- I Squadron – red
- II Squadron – green (Identical to that worn by The Rifles)
- III Squadron – blue
- Training Wing – black
- Corps of Drums – blue red blue (Identical to that worn by the Foot Guards)

Honourable Artillery Company

(RHQ, HQ squadron, and Band)

Honourable Artillery Company

(1 Squadron)

Honourable Artillery Company

(II Squadron)

Honourable Artillery Company

(III Squadron)

Honourable Artillery Company

(Training Wing)

Honourable Artillery Company

(Corps of Drums)

=== Other distinctions ===
HAC ribbon

In 1906, King Edward VII gave the HAC the distinction of a special ribbon for the Volunteer Officers' Decoration and Volunteer Long Service Medal. The ribbon, based on The King's personal colours (in turn taken from the Royal Standard), is red and blue edged with narrow yellow stripes. This ribbon has been carried forward to subsequent Territorial long service medals awarded to HAC members.

B Battery HAC supported the 10th Hussars during the Second World War and, in 1972, the Captain General approved the Battery wearing a 10th Hussar button as the top button on Numbers 1, 2 and 10 dress. This privilege is carried on by Number II Squadron following the 1973 re-organisation.

Each year, the Captain General awards a prize to the member of the regiment who is deemed to have made an outstanding contribution to the Regiment. Holders of this prize, known as the King's or Queen's Prize wear a badge incorporating the Captain General's cypher and the year of award on Numbers 1, 2, 10 and 13 Dress.

=== Coat of arms ===
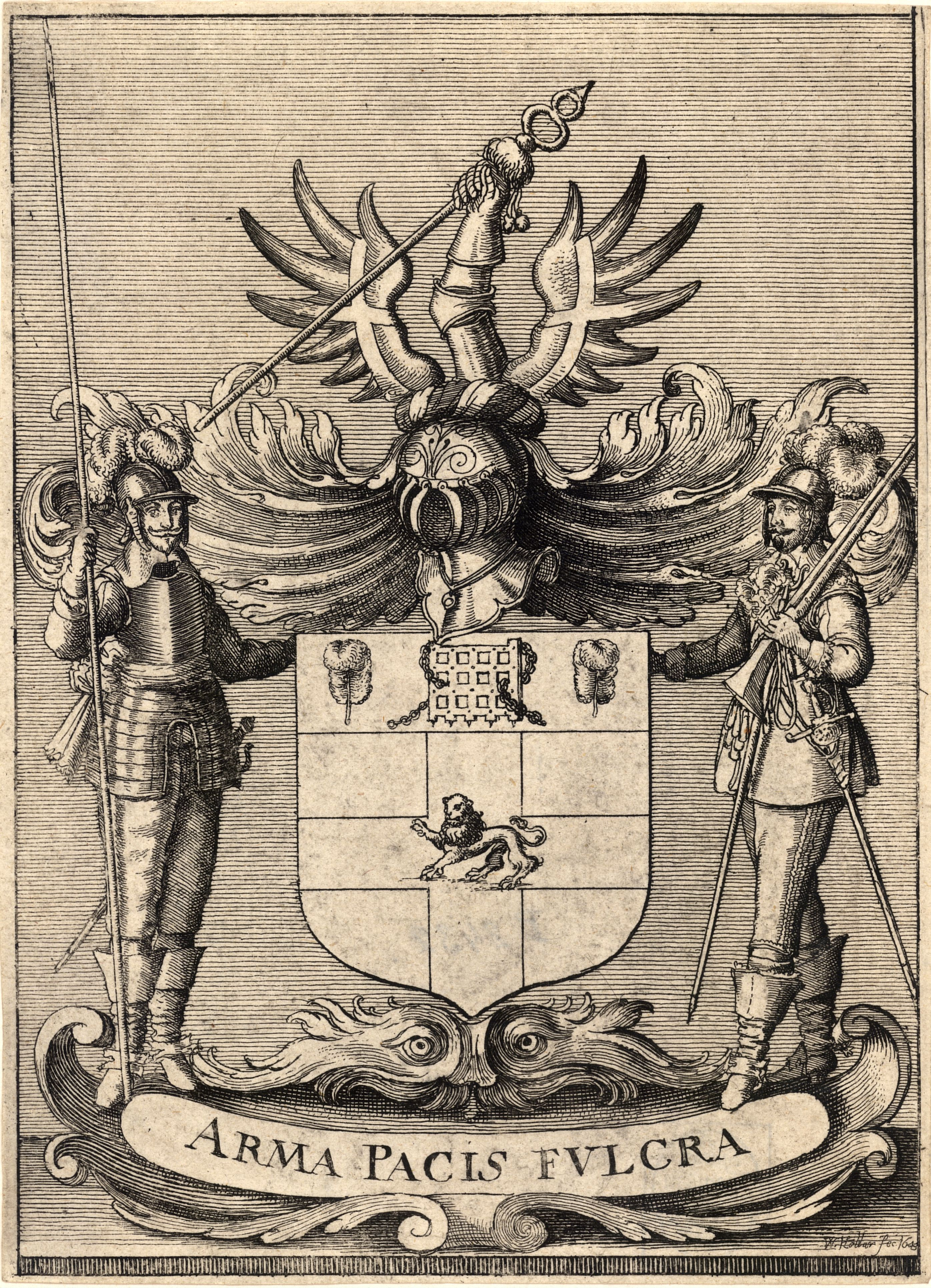
Coat of arms of Artillery Company in the 17th century by Wenceslaus Hollar

The coat of arms of the company is a Shield of Arms, helm, mantling and crest with as supporters a Pikeman and a Musketeer and the motto 'Arma Pacis Fulcra', Unlike other regiments of the British Army, the HAC is incorporated and is therefore eligible to bear and use a Coat of arms. It is believed to date from circa 1615 and the coat of arms appears on a military manual published in 1629.

== Battle honours ==
The regiment's battle honours are as follows:

- **South Africa 1900–02** (Second Boer War).
- The Great War (3 Bns and 7 Btys): **Ypres 1915 '17**, **Somme 1916 '18**, Ancre Heights, **Ancre 1916**, **Arras 1917 '18**, Scarpe 1917 '18, Arleux, **Bullecourt**, Pilckem, Polygon Wood, Broodseinde, Poelcappelle, **Passchendaele**, Amiens, Albert 1918, Bapaume 1918, Drocourt-Quéant, Hindenburg Line, Épèhy, St. Quentin Canal, Cambrai 1918, Selle, Sambre, **France and Flanders 1914–18**, Piave, **Vittorio Veneto**, Italy 1917–18, Rafah, Egypt 1915–17, **Gaza**, El Mughar, **Jerusalem**, Jordan, Megiddo, Sharon, Damascus, Palestine 1917–18, Aden.
- The Second World War: Bourguébus Ridge, Antwerp, Le Havre, **Rhine, North-West Europe 1944–45**, **Knightsbridge, El Alamein, El Hamma**, Sbiba, **Thala, Tunis**, North Africa 1941–43, **Sicily 1943, Cassino II, Coriano**, Senio, Italy 1944–45.

The battle honours listed were awarded for services of both infantry and artillery units of the HAC. Those in bold are borne on the Colours.

== Colours ==
The HAC is unique within the British Army in having two types of Colours. The HAC has its ceremonial Guns (which are considered Colours in Artillery regiments), but also carries a stand of traditional Colours of the Infantry. These Colours follow the pattern of line infantry regiments: the King's Colour being a version of the Union Flag, the Regimental Colour being blue with the HAC Coat of Arms in the centre. The last four occasions that new Colours have been presented to the Regiment were in 1928 by Edward, Prince of Wales (later Edward VIII), and in 1955, 1980 and on 18 May 2007 by HM Queen Elizabeth II, the regiment's Captain General.

== City of London Police Special Constabulary ==
In 1919, following a decision to increase the strength of the Metropolitan Police Reserve Force, the Home Secretary approached the HAC to form a Division of Special Constabulary. Some 150 members, mostly Great War veterans, rallied to the call and joined the Division, forming the HAC Detachment. At the outbreak of the Second World War, the Detachment was integrated into G Division of the Metropolitan Police and then later with Islington Division. Following reorganisation, the Detachment was part of the City of London Police Special Constabulary, its administrative base having been Armoury House.

In 2010, the Ferrers Trophy was awarded to Special Constable Patrick Rarden of the detachment for using his banking skills and experience to help train colleagues and provide invaluable assistance to solve fraud cases.

As of May 2026, the Detachment remains suspended, following a decision by the City of London Police to discontinue the role they provided.

== "The Company" ==
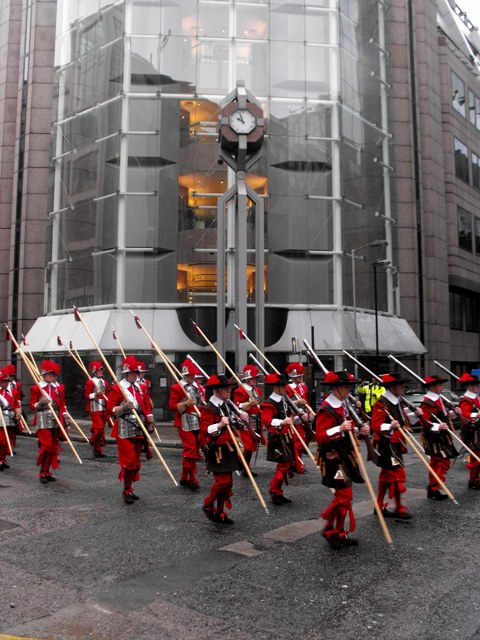
Musketeers and Pikemen Lord Mayor's Parade

As well as the Army Reserve Regiment and Specials (the "Active Units"), the HAC exists as a separate charitable organisation—often colloquially referred to as "The Company" or "The House". The Company owns Armoury House and the regiment's current grounds and, in addition to supporting the Active Unit, provides the basis for a social calendar. There are two distinct classes of member of the company. The first, Regimental Members, are those who are currently serving or who have previously served in the HAC Regiment or City of London Special Constabulary. The second, Members, must have served at least two years in Regular or three years in Volunteer units of the Crown or in the Police. Some members are people who have reached senior rank (for example Major General The Duke of Westminster) and they provide some 17% of the overall membership of the company.

Since 1633, the company has been governed by a Court of Assistants, like many of the City Livery Companies. The first Court for which a record can be found was held in January 1657.

=== Pikemen and Musketeers ===
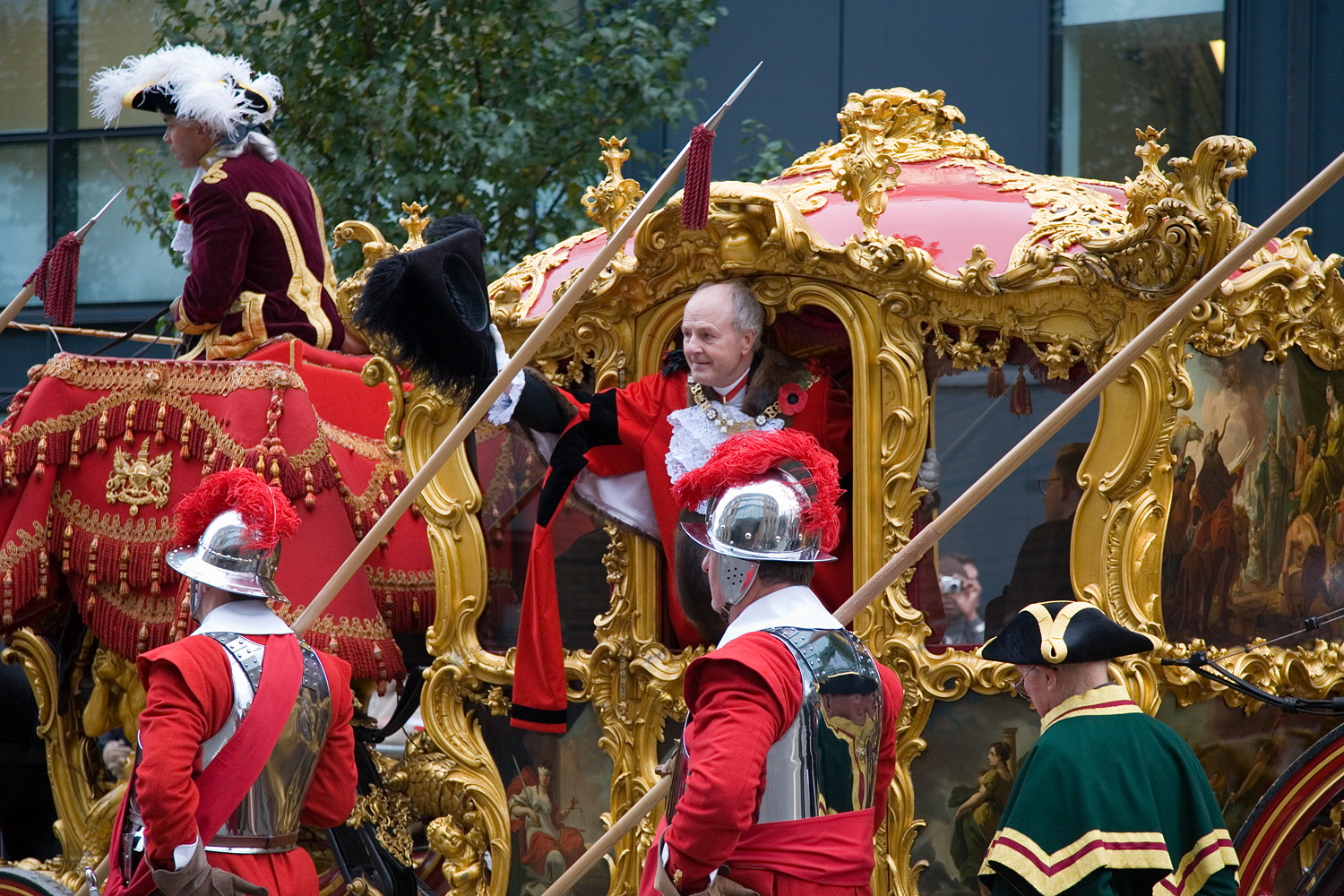
Pikemen escorting John Stuttard, Lord Mayor of the City of London during the 2006 Lord Mayor's Show

The Pikemen and Musketeers (formed 1925, given a Royal Warrant 1955) are made up of veteran members of the Active Units. They are the personal bodyguard of the Lord Mayor of the City of London and form his Guard on ceremonial occasions.

=== Light Cavalry ===
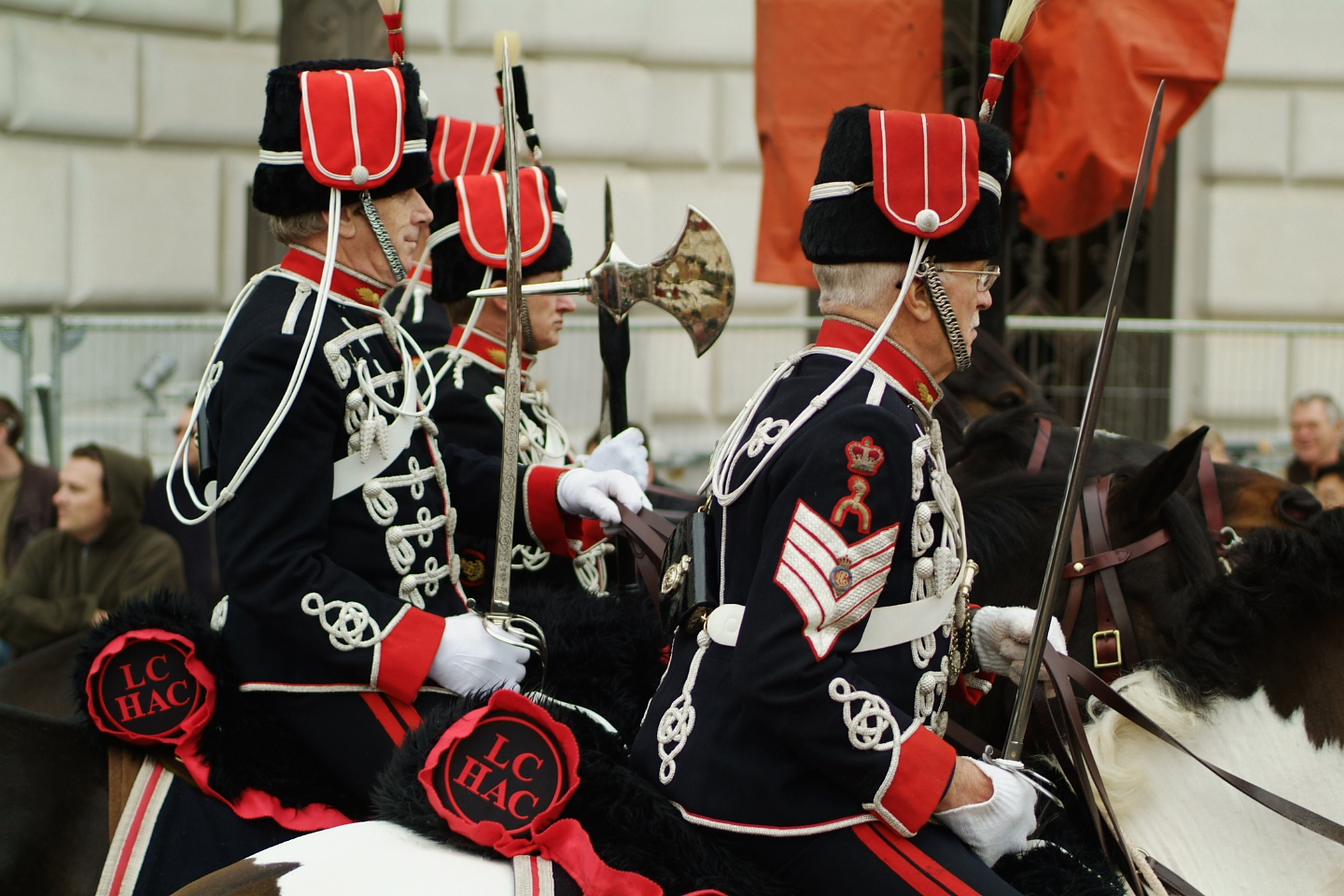
Light Cavalry HAC at the Lord Mayor's Show

The Light Cavalry Troop (formed 1979, granted Royal Warrant 2004) is open to both Regimental and Non-Regimental members of the company. They escort the Lady Mayoress, and in particular provide her 'Travelling Escort' at the Lord Mayor's Show.

=== Grounds ===
==== Site ====
From 1538 to 1658, the HAC occupied and trained at the Old Artillery Ground in Spitalfields on the site of the outer precinct of the dissolved Priory and Hospital of St Mary Spital. In 1658, following disputes over use of the Ground with the Gunners of the Tower, it moved to its current site south of the Bunhill Fields Burial Ground continuing to the south as far as Chiswell Street. This area is described in a map of the area of 1677 as the 'New Artillery Garden' and has variously been referred to as the Artillery Ground and the Artillery Garden. This current site now falls in the London Borough of Islington, and is just north of the City of London, the main entrance being in City Road. During the aftermath of the 7 July 2005 London bombings on the London transport system, the Artillery Garden was used as a temporary mortuary.

==== Armoury House ====
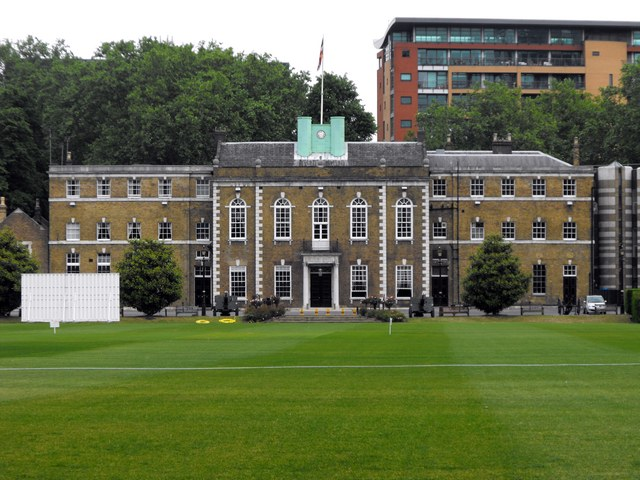
Armoury House

Armoury House stands at the north of these grounds, and is the home of the HAC. It was built to replace a smaller 17th-century armoury; the central portion being completed in 1735 to designs by Thomas Stibbs financed in part by a gift of £500 from King George I. Subscriptions were received from members of the company and from the Court of Lieutenancy for the City of London. The building cost £1,332.

In 1802, a distinctive flag tower was added to the roof. The East and West Wings were built in 1828, replacing much smaller buildings on either side of Armoury House. A cottage, originally for the Sergeant Major, was built against the West Wing in 1850. 1862 saw the completion of a Victorian drill hall attached to the rear. The Albert Room, as it was called, featured an iron trussed roof and was named in honour of the then recently deceased Prince Albert.

On 9 June 1990, the hall was bombed by the Provisional IRA whilst a 21st birthday party was in progress, injuring 17 civilians.

In recent years, parts of the building have been available on a private hire basis for events.

==== Finsbury Barracks ====
Royal London Militia Act 1855
- Act of Parliament
- Parliament of the United Kingdom
- Long title: An Act to amend an Act of the First Year of the Reign of King George the Fourth, Chapter 100, to enable Her Majesty's Commissioners of Lieutenancy for the City of London to purchase certain Lands and Houses for building more convenient and requisite Head Quarters, Storehouses, and other proper Accommodation for the Royal London Militia, and to confer certain other Powers.
- Citation: 18 & 19 Vict. c. cxlv

Dates
- Royal assent: 16 July 1855
Other legislation
Amends	Militia (City of London) Act 1820

Text of statute as originally enacted

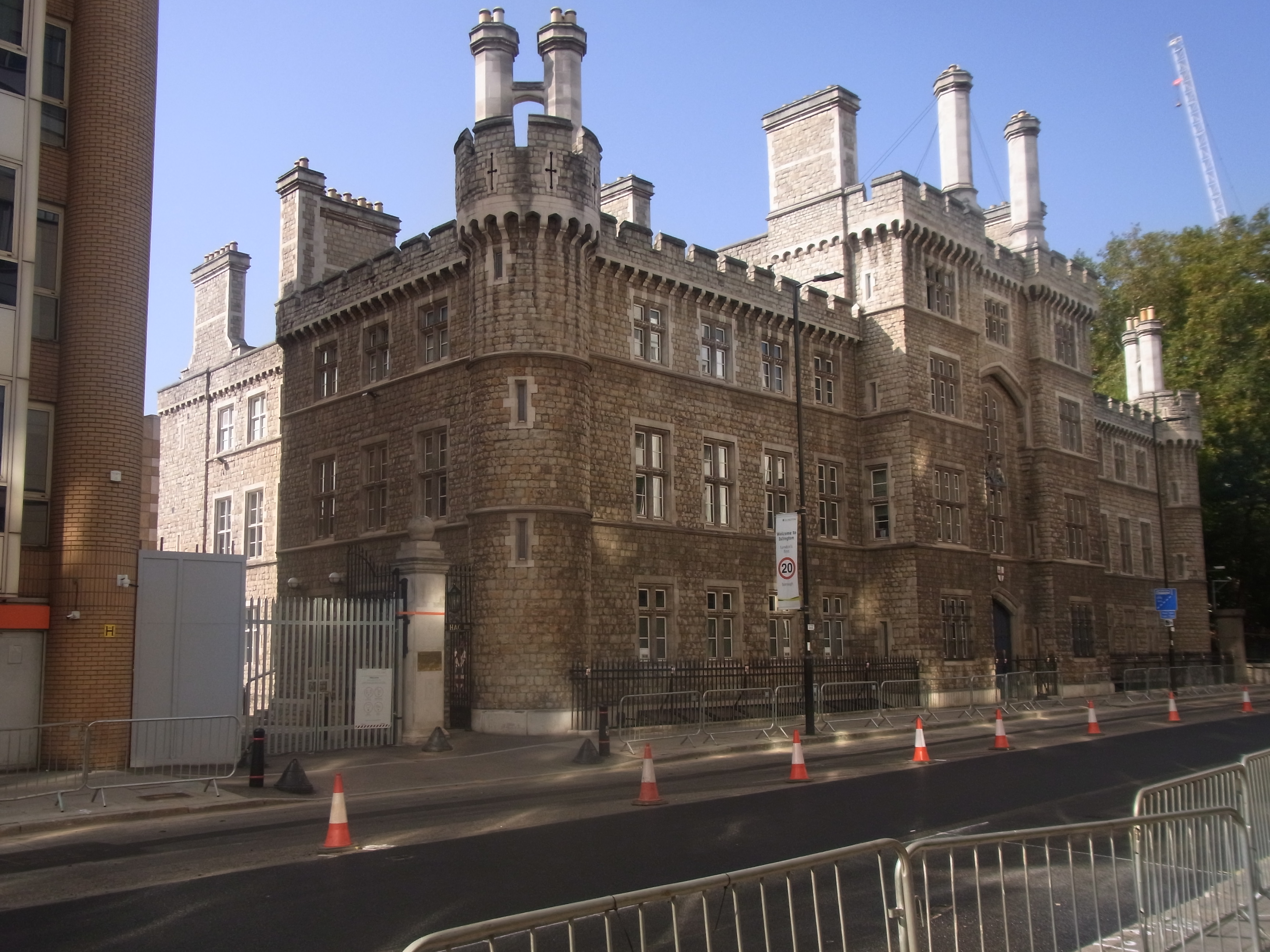
Finsbury Barracks

Finsbury Barracks is the regiment's headquarters and is leased by London RFCA from the HAC itself. Authorised by the Royal London Militia Act 1855 (18 & 19 Vict. c. cxlv) and completed for the Royal London Militia in 1857, it was designed by the architect Joseph Jennings and built in Kentish ragstone. An extension, faced in striped stone and granite, linking Finsbury Barracks to Armoury House was designed by Arnold & Boston and added in 1994. Finsbury Barracks was refurbished in the same year and was re-opened by the Captain General in 1996.

==== The HAC Shooting Lodge / "Bisley Hut" ====
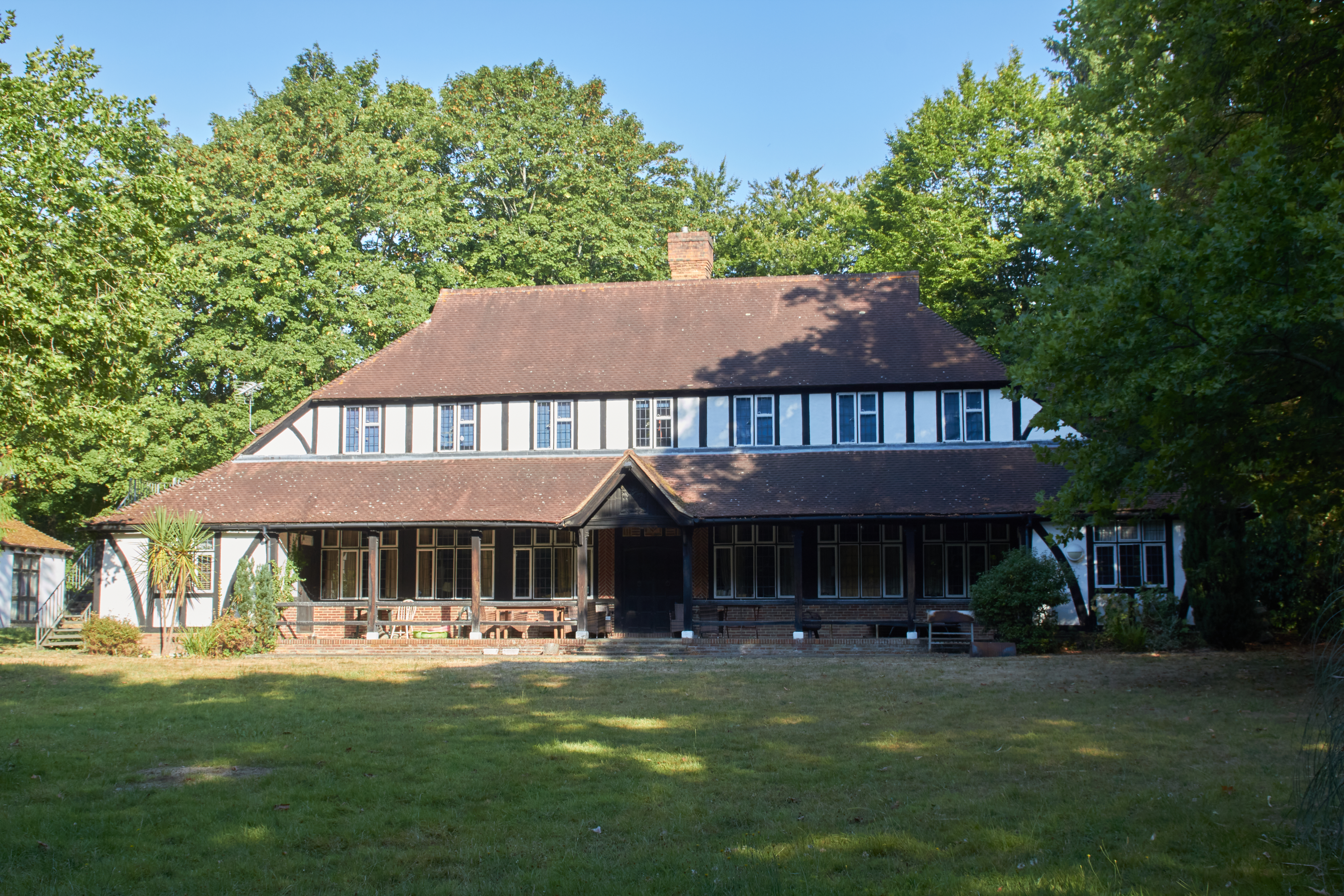
Former HAC Lodge, National Shooting Centre

The lodge was built in 1928 on land leased from the National Rifle Association at Bisley and replaced the original hut on the site. The building was funded by donations, including some in memory of the fallen of the First World War. HAC vacated the lodge in 2012 following the expiry of their lease and now affiliates to the London & Middlesex Rifle Association.

==== Pencelli Estate ====
In 1999, the company acquired the Welsh Pencelli Estate near Brecon as an area that could be used by the regiment for military and adventure training. The historic estate lies in the heart of the Brecon Beacons National Park and comprises approximately 14,000 acres (57 km^{2}) of hill land.

== Notable members of the HAC ==
Captains General of the HAC
Appointed	Incumbent	Reference
1657	Major General Philip Skippon	
1660	James II	
1690	William III	
1702	Prince George of Denmark and Norway, Duke of Cumberland	
1715	George II	
1766	George IV	
1830	William IV	
1837	Prince Augustus Frederick, Duke of Sussex	
1843	Prince Albert, the Prince Consort	
24 July 1863	Edward VII	
7 May 1910	George V	
1 February 1936	Edward VIII	
10 December 1936	George VI	
6 February 1952	Elizabeth II	
10 August 2023	Charles III	

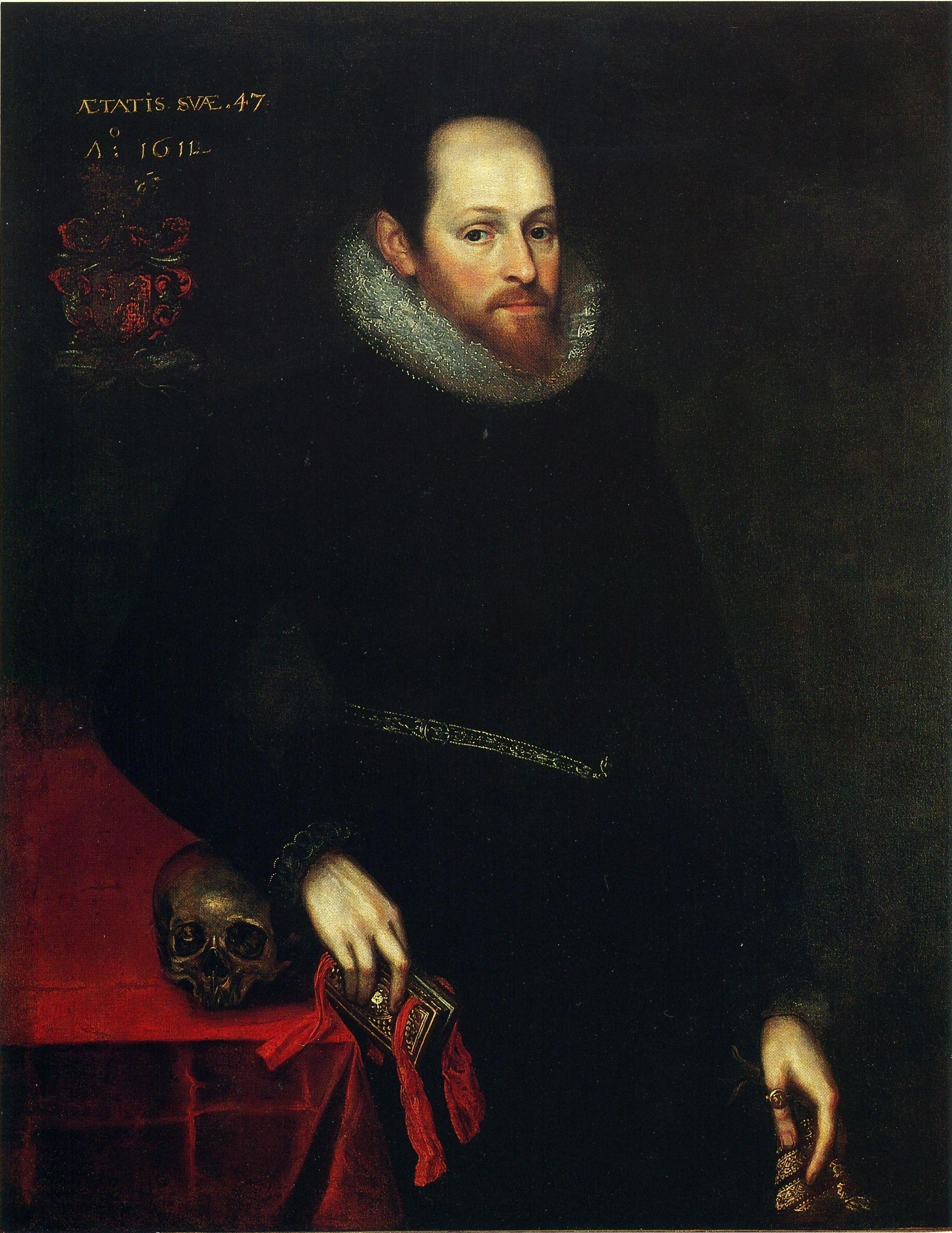
Lord Mayor of London Hugh Hamersley, Commander of the HAC 1619, 1633

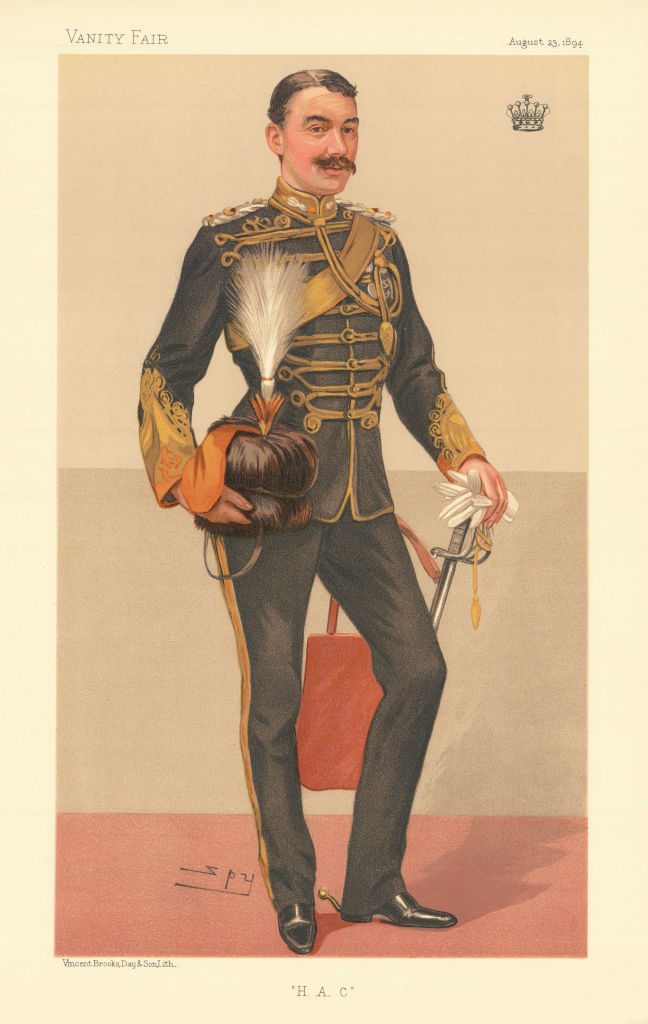
The Earl of Denbigh in HAC Uniform as caricatured by Spy (Leslie Ward) in Vanity Fair, August 1894

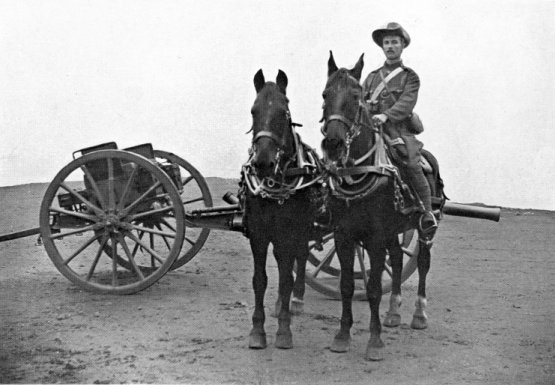
Driver Childers, Honourable Artillery Company

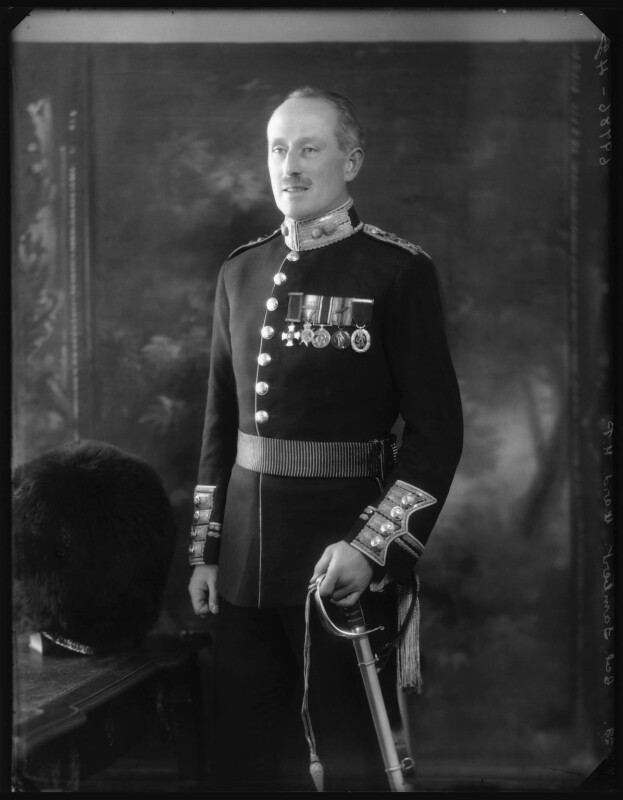
Lt Col Sir Albert Lambert Ward CVO DSO DL TD HAC

Colonels Commandant

- Colonel Rudolph Feilding, 9th Earl of Denbigh (1903–1933)
- Colonel George Monckton-Arundell, 8th Viscount Galway (1933–1935)
- Colonel Hugh Fortescue, 5th Earl Fortescue (1935–1943)
- Field Marshal John Vereker, 6th Viscount Gort (1943–1946)
- Field Marshal Alan Brooke, 1st Viscount Alanbrooke (1946–1954)
- Major General Sir Julian Gascoigne (1954–1959)
- General Sir Richard Goodbody (1959–1966)
- General Sir Rodney Moore (1966–1976)
- General Sir Victor FitzGeorge-Balfour (1976–1984)
- General Sir Richard Trant (1984–1992)
- General Sir Michael Wilkes (1992–1998)
- General Sir Alexander Harley (1998–2003)
- General Sir Timothy Granville-Chapman (2003–2010)
- Lieutenant General Sir Barney White-Spunner (2010–2013)
- General Sir Richard Barrons (2013–2019)
- General Sir Patrick Sanders (2019–2024)
- General Sir Roland Walker (2024–present)

Others

- Major Tom Addington, an outstanding all-rounder: sportsman, Commando, paratrooper and horse gunner, he was awarded an MC in the Netherlands.
- Jock Airlie (Seton), Association Football Player
- Kevin Alderton, holder of the blind speed ski world record
- Edward John Amoore, Olympic gold and bronze medalist for shooting at 1908 Olympics
- Major General Dennis Beckett, appointed a Companion of the Distinguished Service Order at the Battle of Monte Cassino
- Prince Rupert of the Rhine
- George Monck, 1st Duke of Albemarle
- Gregory Barker
- Nigel Bruce, actor. Served with the Regiment 1914–1915
- Bertram Bowyer, 2nd Baron Denham, a British Conservative politician, hereditary peer, writer and former member of the House of Lords. He was one of the few people to serve in the governments of five different Prime Ministers.
- Major Robert Cain, recipient of the Victoria Cross at the battle of Arnhem
- Sir James Carreras, British film producer, who, with William Hinds, founded the legendary British film company Hammer Film Productions
- Leo Cooper, publisher
- John Laurie, actor
- Edward Leigh, member of parliament
- Charles Greenwood, earned a Military Cross at Monte Cassino
- Sir Edward Heath, former Prime Minister
- Colonel Robert Dow Hunter – Army officer who knocked out two Tiger tanks in Germany
- LGen Andrew Leslie, former Chief of Land Staff, Canadian Forces
- Major David Liddell
- Guy Liddell, one of Britain's principal wartime spymasters
- Gilbert McMicking, Scottish Liberal Party politician
- Vincenzo Lunardi, honorary member
- General Sir Richard O'Connor
- Richard Owen, English biologist, comparative anatomist and palaeontologist.
- Sir Robert Peake, printer-publisher and later a Royalist army officer in the English Civil War, became vice-president of the Company during the 1660s, until his death in 1667.
- Kenneth Powell, Olympic hurdler
- Hugh Pritchard, Olympic biathlete at the 2002 games
- Prince Henry, Duke of Gloucester
- Sir Marmaduke Roydon (1583–1646) an English merchant-adventurer and colonial planter, known also as a Royalist army officer
- Patrick Shovelton, one of Whitehall's most formidable international negotiators
- John Talbot, awarded the MC in Normandy in 1944
- John Venn an English politician who sat in the House of Commons from 1641 to 1650. He was one of the regicides of King Charles I.
- Sir Lambert Ward, 1st Baronet, Conservative Party politician
- Basil Williams, historian
- Evelyn Wellings (1909–1992) Egyptian-born English cricketer and journalist, who played for the University of Oxford and Surrey
- Sir John Wraight, diplomat

== Affiliations ==
- South Africa – Sandfontein Artillery Regiment
- United States – Ancient and Honorable Artillery Company of Massachusetts

=== Schools affiliation ===
In 1995, six public schools (Eton, Harrow, Marlborough, Radley, Rugby and Wellington) became affiliated to the company. The rationale behind these affiliations is to facilitate communication with the schools and to inform students of the opportunities available to them within the HAC.

=== Cadet force ===
The HAC established a Cadet Battalion in 1942 during the Second World War which continued until 1958. During the War and until 1948, members of the Cadet Battalion fired salutes and provided guards of honour whilst members of the HAC were away on active service. In 2012, the HAC sponsored and helped establish a cadet unit at the City of London Academy Islington and, in 2018, another at Mossbourne Community Academy.

== See also ==
- Honourable Artillery Company Museum
- Transvaal Horse Artillery
- Ancient and Honorable Artillery Company of Massachusetts

== Order of precedence ==
Preceded by Royal Monmouthshire Royal Engineers	Order of Precedence	Succeeded by Army Reserve

== Sources ==
- Goold Walker, G. (1986). The Honourable Artillery Company, 1537–1987. London: Honourable Artillery Company.
- Litchfield, Norman E.H. (1992). The Territorial Artillery 1908–1988: Their Lineage, Uniforms and Badges. Nottingham: Sherwood Press. ISBN 0-9508205-2-0.
- Money Barnes, Major R. (1963). The Soldiers of London. London: Seeley Service.
- Routledge, Brigadier N.W. (1994). History of the Royal Regiment of Artillery: Anti-Aircraft Artillery 1914–55. London: Royal Artillery Institution/Brassey's. ISBN 1-85753-099-3.
