= Security force assistance =

Military term for adviser assistance to foreign forces

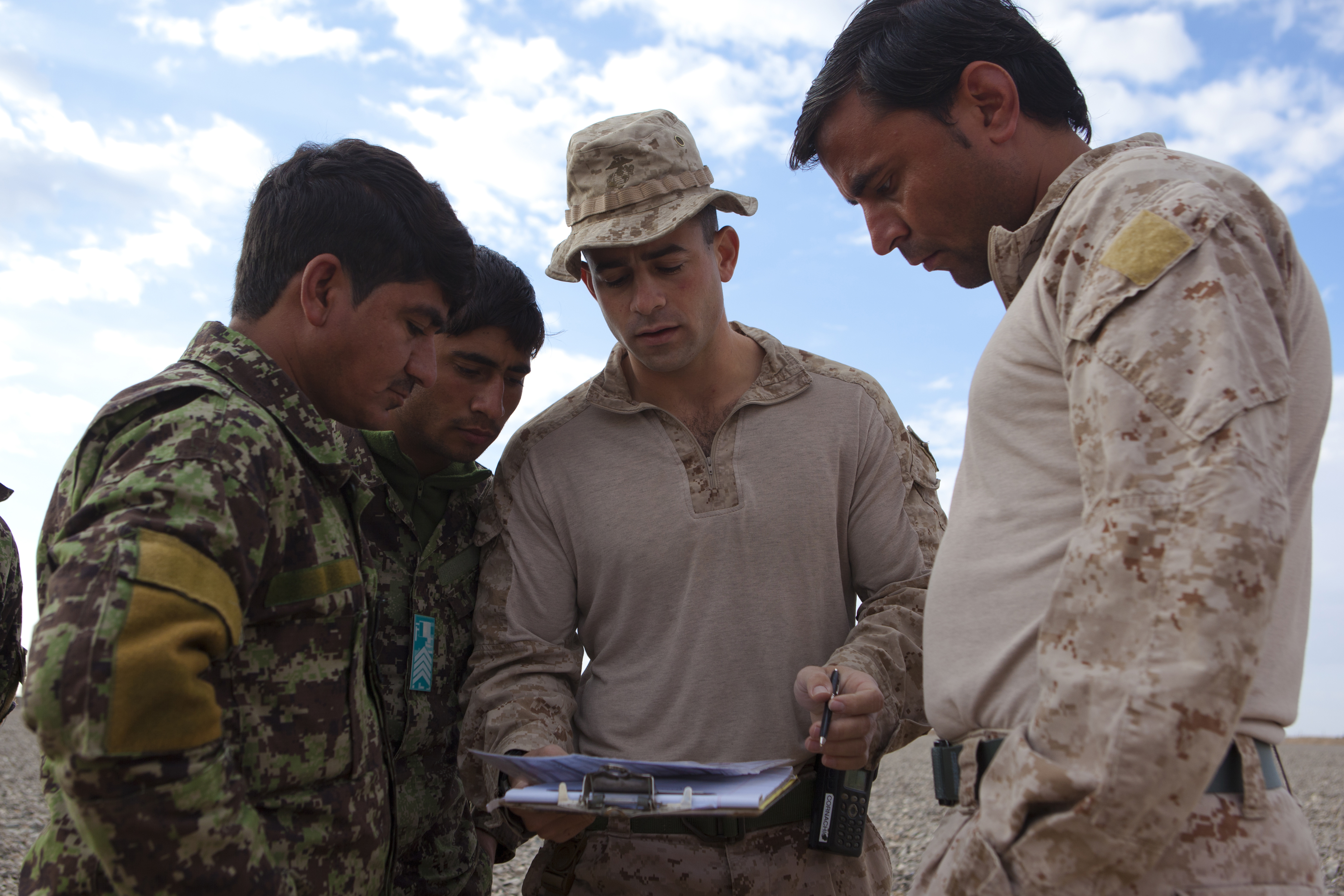
American advisers teaching mortar firing techniques to Afghan soldiers during the War in Afghanistan

Security Force Assistance (SFA) a term originating in the United States Armed Forces for military adviser assistance with "training, equipping and advising allied or 'partner' militaries to enable them to defend themselves without 100,000 Americans on the ground to do it for them."

SFA is used when improving the security of the host country aligns with the national interests of the donor country. It may be used alongside or instead of larger commitments of the donor country's military personnel and matériel. This means SFA can provide an alternative to large-scale operations if a war becomes controversial or politically difficult.

Given the ending of the wars in Afghanistan and Iraq, with US-led multinational missions to train and equip both states for counterinsurgency, the United States Army has begun returning to its constant preoccupation of large-scale regular warfare ("Large Scale Combat Operations" is the current jargon). What SFA efforts remain are being much more directed towards helping partners with regular warfare training.

== Definitions ==
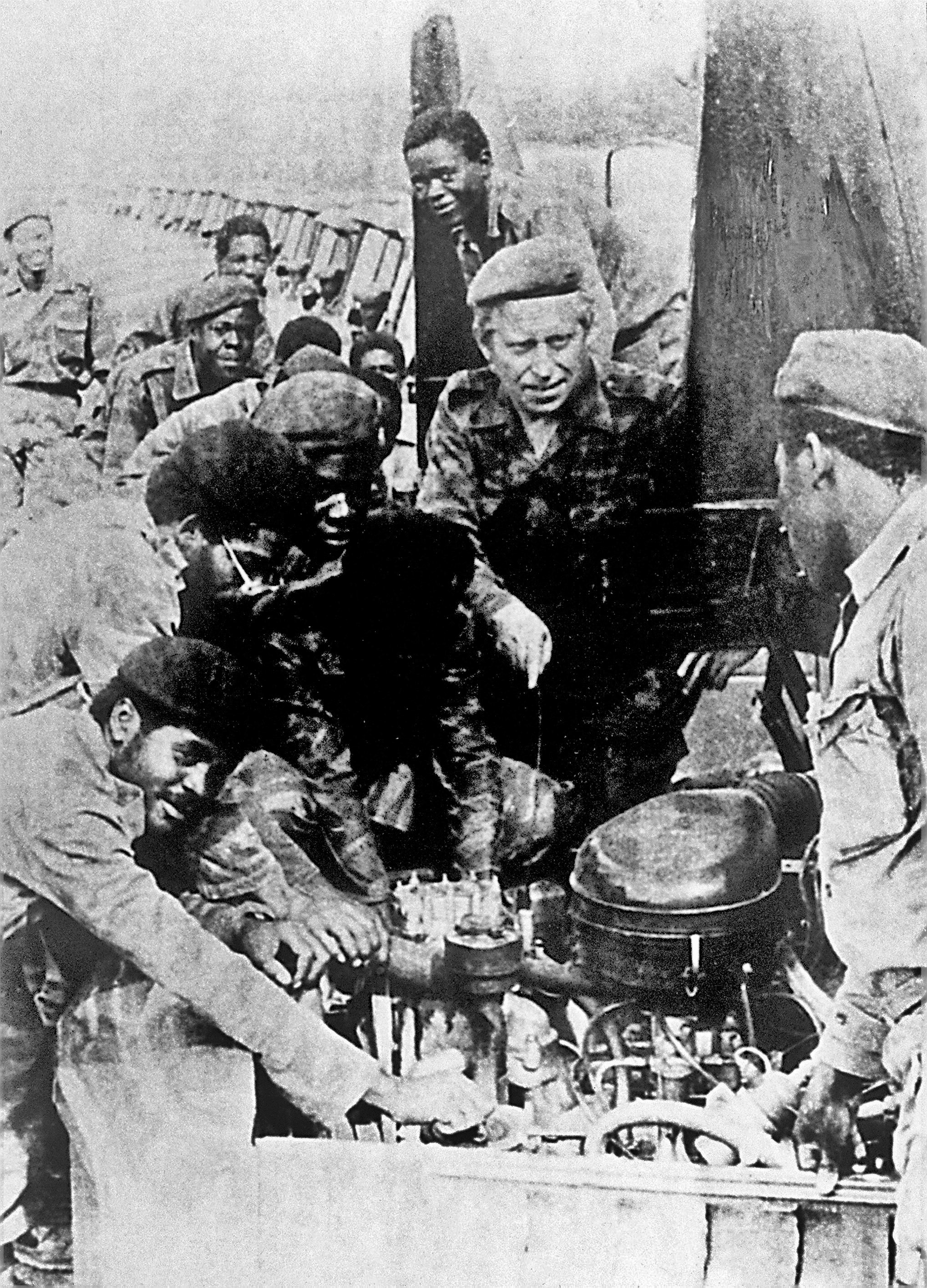
Eastern Bloc and Soviet Union military advisers during the Angolan Civil War

US Army Field Manual 3-07.1 defines SFA as:

Security force assistance is the unified action to generate, employ, and sustain local, host-nation or regional security forces in support of a legitimate authority.

— Field Manual 3-07.1: Security Force Assistance, 2009

Allied Joint Publication-3.16 defines SFA as:

Security force assistance (SFA) includes all NATO activities that develop and improve, or directly support, the development of local forces and their associated institutions in crisis zones. Local forces comprise indigenous, non-NATO military security forces...

— Allied Joint Doctrine for Security Force Assistance (AJP-3.16), 2016

Joint Publication 3-20, Security Cooperation, defines SFA as:

Security force assistance is the set of Department of Defense security cooperation activities that contribute to unified action by the United States Government to support the development of the capacity and capabilities of foreign security forces and their supporting institutions, whether of a partner nation or an international organization (e.g., regional security organization), in support of US objectives.

— Joint Publication 3-20, Security Cooperation, 2017

== Distinction ==
SFA is linked to, though distinct from, Foreign Internal Defense (FID). It is a common misconception that the two are the same. One difference between the two is that FID is chiefly smaller-scale and the domain of Special Operations Forces (SOF), and SFA is chiefly larger-scale and the domain of conventional forces, but neither exclusively so. Differences may also be found in that FID is a tactical mission of irregular warfare (IW), giving focus on the local population facing internal threats, whereas SFA is an operational or strategic mission that falls under conventional warfare and focuses on state-level forces that may be both internal and external. Where FID was carried out for decades by special operations forces during the Cold War, the United States developed SFA beginning in about 2006.

== History ==
Although SFA is relatively new as a concept within western military doctrine, it has been practiced as long as states have had the technology and power to carry it out. Historical examples of SFA are the role of France in the American Revolutionary War and the Cuban intervention in Angola. The modern concept of SFA, however, is intrinsically linked to the International Security Assistance Force in the War in Afghanistan and the NATO Training Mission of the Iraq War. These conflicts gave rise to the current understanding of SFA, and the strategies employed within them also led to the need to define SFA and how to approach it within US military doctrine.

FID, which can be seen as the tactical-level equivalent to the strategic-level SFA, also has a long history. It was employed often during the Cold War by units such as United States Army Special Forces. This can be seen in Project 404 and the role of the 8th Special Forces Group in assisting Bolivia to fight the Ñancahuazú Guerrilla. The US Army Special Forces were enlarged and directed to focus on FID by President John F. Kennedy to counter the global influence of the Soviet Union and to prevent Communist insurgencies gaining power abroad, motivated by thinking based upon domino theory. In fact, FID has been a core part of the role of modern SOF units since they came into being.

Following their initial invasions, both the War in Afghanistan and the Iraq War developed into guerrilla wars, with the US-led allies in both conflicts primarily carrying out counterinsurgency and nation-building thereafter. The importance of SFA in the subsequent strategy of the Western forces can be seen in the respective formation of the International Security Assistance Force and NATO Training Mission – Iraq. The key role of SFA in US strategy in the War on Terror and lack of existing SFA doctrine meant that it had to be developed; this began in approximately 2007 to 2008.

The importance of SFA within NATO's approach to the war on terror has led to NATO countries prioritizing the development of their SFA capabilities with dedicated units. For example, the United States Army began to create its Security Force Assistance Brigades (SFABs) within Security Force Assistance Command in 2018. Similarly, the United Kingdom established both the 11th Security Force Assistance Brigade and British Army Ranger Regiment in 2021, both of which specialize in SFA and FID. Finally, the institutionalization of SFA can be best seen with the establishment of the NATO SFA Center of Excellence (Rome, Italy) in 2017, to collect lessons learned and advance conceptual development of SFA best practices, doctrine, education, training, etc.

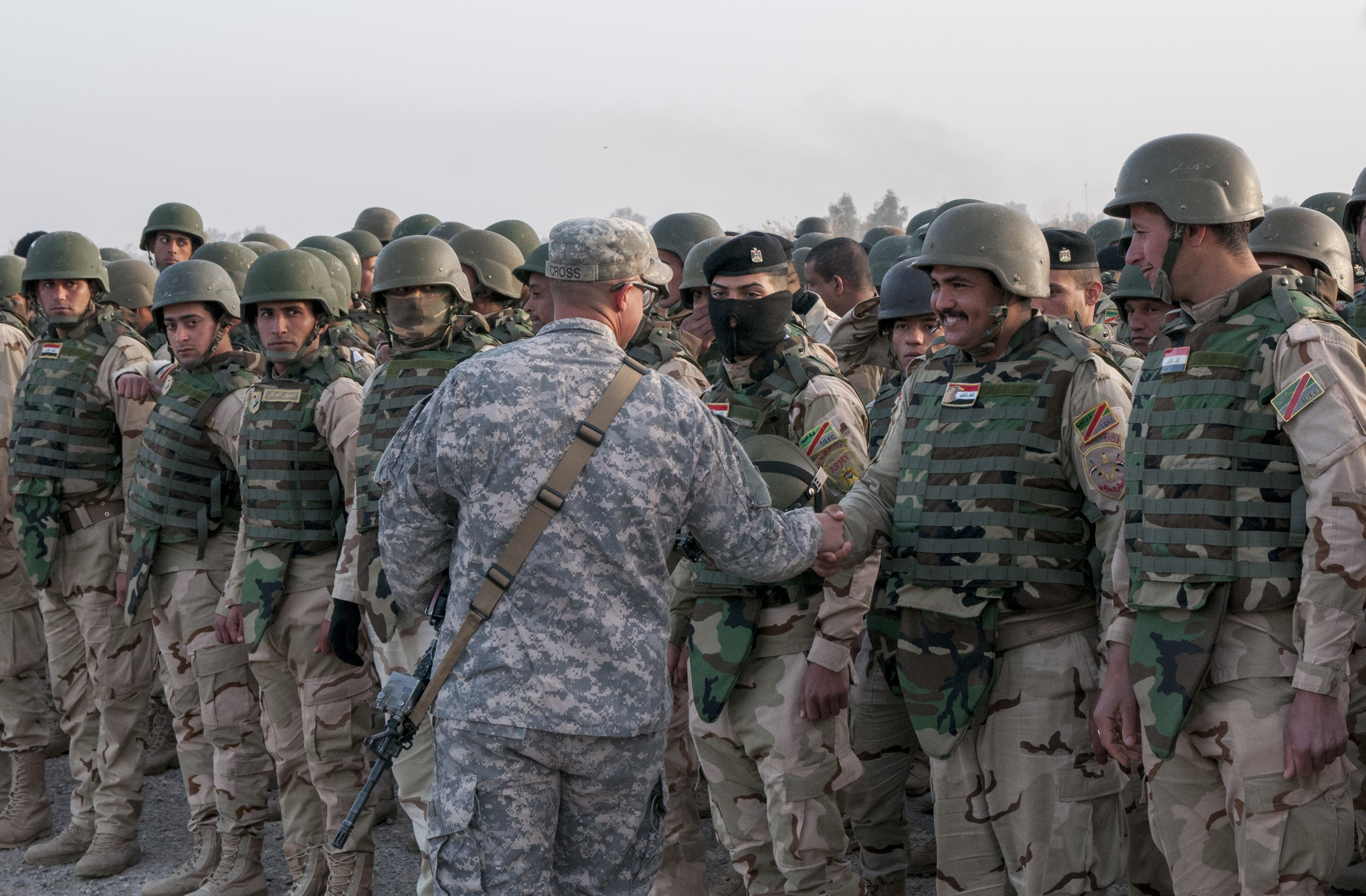
Iraqi army soldiers finish training assisted by American advisers during the Iraq War.

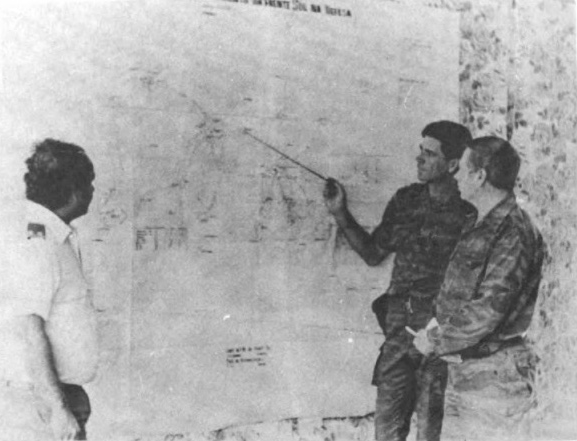
Soviet Armed Forces advisers help plan operations during the Angolan Civil War.

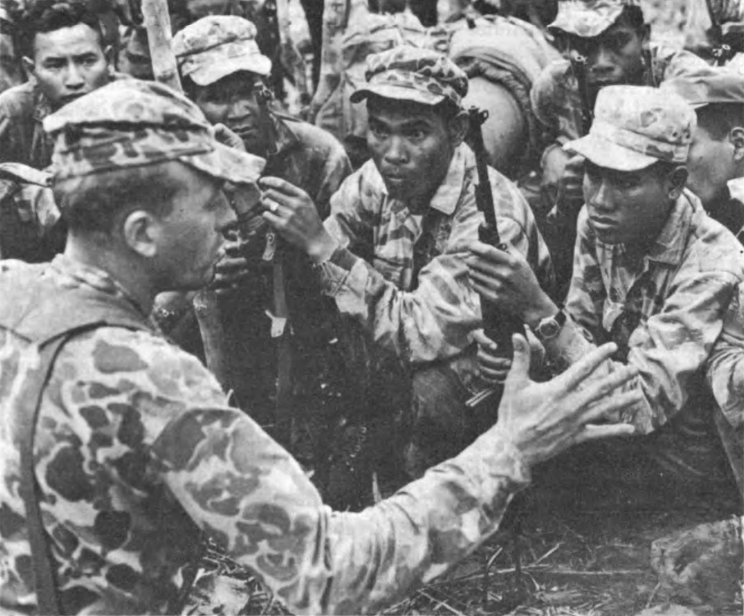
An adviser from United States Army Special Forces briefs members of the Montagnard strike force prior to an operation during the Vietnam War.

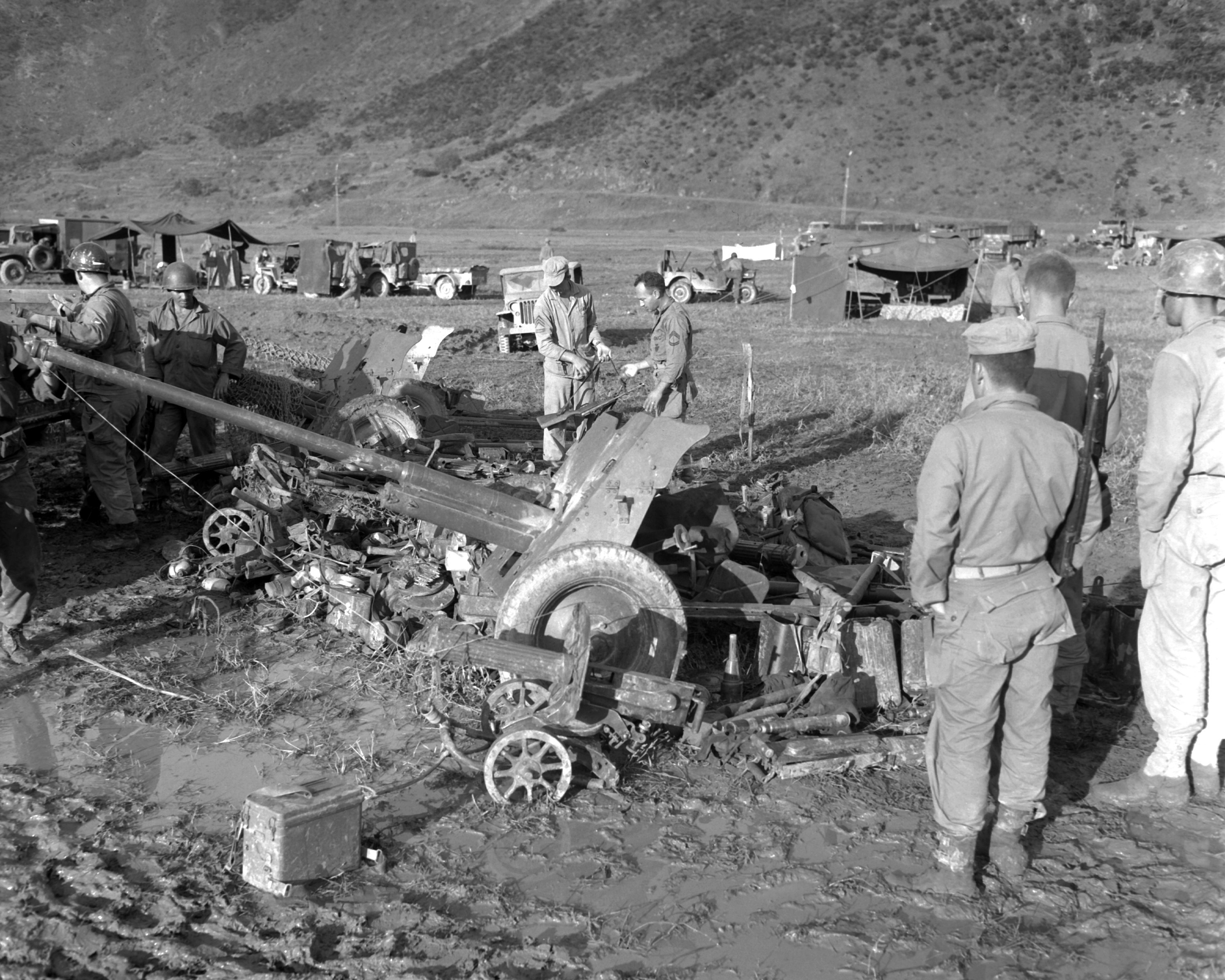
Soviet matériel used by North Korea during the Korean War

== British and U.S. units and formations ==
Below is an incomplete list of units that today specialize in SFA or FID as one part of a wider SFA strategy.

=== United Kingdom ===
- United Kingdom Special Forces
- Army Special Operations Brigade
- 11th Security Force Assistance Brigade

=== United States of America ===
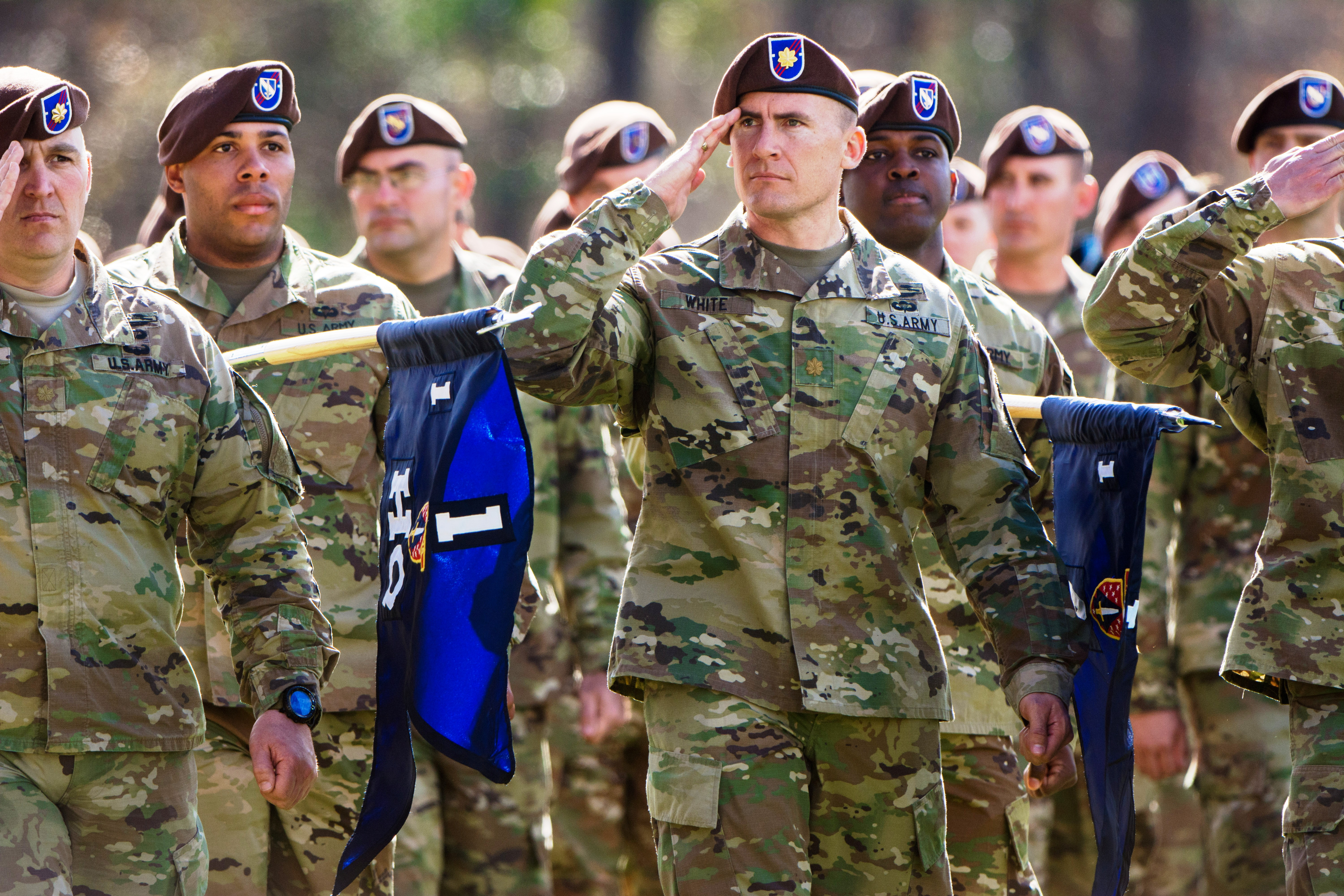
Activation ceremony of the 1st Security Force Assistance Brigade

- Security Force Assistance Brigades
- United States Army Special Forces
- United States Navy SEALs
- Joint Special Operations Command

== See also ==
- Unconventional warfare
- Nation-building
- Military Assistance Advisory Group
- Military adviser
- War on terror
- Lend-Lease
- List of foreign aid to Ukraine during the Russo-Ukrainian War
