= Honourable Artillery Company Museum =

Regimental museum in London, England

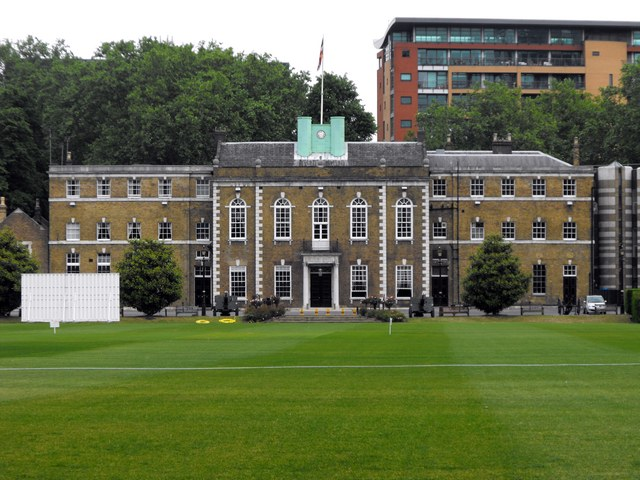
- Armoury House

- Shown in Islington
- Established: 1987 (39 years ago)
- Location: Armoury House, City Road, London
- Coordinates: 51°31′22″N 0°5′18″W
- Type: Military
- Website: www.hac.org.uk

The Honourable Artillery Company Museum opened in 1987 in Armoury House, City Road, London, England. It is associated with the Honourable Artillery Company, the oldest regiment in the British Army, which still maintains an active regiment as a core part of today's Army Reserve.

== History ==
The museum was opened in 1987 when a large volume of archival material and militaria was sorted and put on display. After a complete re-build, it was re-opened by the Duke of Edinburgh on 12 October 2011.

== Contents ==
The collection includes uniforms, armour, silver, medals and decorations, weapons, equipment and applied art. The archives date from 1537 and are of particular interest for 17th- and 18th-century militia and City of London matters.

== Admission ==
The museum is only open to members of the company and their guests.

== Sources ==
- Goold Walker, G. (1986). The Honourable Artillery Company, 1537–1987. London: Honourable Artillery Company.
