= Robin Hunter (British Army officer) =

Robert Hunter
- Born: 6 December 1919; London
- Died: 13 March 2016 (aged 96)
- Military career
- Allegiance: United Kingdom
- Branch: British Army
- Service years: 1939–1946 1948–
- Rank: Colonel
- Service number: 129058
- Conflicts: Second World War
- Awards: Military Cross

Colonel Robert Dow Hunter, OBE, MC (6 December 1919 – 13 March 2016), known as Robin Hunter, was an officer in the British Army during World War II. Whilst a captain commanding an anti-tank platoon of 5th Battalion, King's Own Scottish Borderers, he knocked out two Tiger tanks in Waldfeucht. For this he received the Military Cross.

Born in London and educated at Christ's Hospital, he joined the Honourable Artillery Company in 1939.
