= GSC =

GSC may refer to:

== Business ==
- Game Show Central, an American TV network
- Global Security Challenge, a business competition
- Golden Screen Cinemas, in Malaysia
- Golden Star Resources, a Canadian gold mining company
- Good Smile Company, a Japanese manufacturer of hobby products
- GSC Enterprises, Inc., an American retailer and financial services company
- GSC Systems, a Canadian propeller manufacturer

== Education ==
- Gainesville State College, now a campus of the University of North Georgia, in Oakwood, Georgia, United States
- Glasgow Science Centre, in Scotland
- Glassboro State College, now Rowan University, in Glassboro, New Jersey, United States
- Glenville State College, now Glenville State University, in Glenville, West Virginia, United States
- Global Studies Consortium, an international academic association
- Government Saadat College, in Karatia, Tangail, Bangladesh
- Government Science College (disambiguation)
- Granite State College, in New Hampshire, United States
- Greensboro Science Center, in North Carolina, United States

== Entertainment ==
- Game Show Congress, a conference series
- Granite State Challenge, an American quizbowl television show
- The Great Space Coaster, an American children's television show
- Gunsmith Cats, a Japanese seinen manga
- GSC Game World, a Ukrainian video game developer
- Pokémon Gold, Silver and Pokémon Crystal

== Government and military ==
- Air Force Global Strike Command, a major command of the United States Air Force
- General Secretariat of the Council of the European Union
- General Service Corps, of the British Army
- Geological Survey of Canada

== Science and technology ==
- GSC (gene), encoding the goosecoid protein
- Global Standards Collaboration, in telecoms
- Genomic Standards Consortium
- Group switching centre, a former British telephone exchange
- GSC bus, a computer bus
- Guangzhou Science City, in Guangdong, China
- Guiana Space Centre, in French Guiana
- Guide Star Catalog, an astronomical catalogue
- Google Search Console, a webmasters' tool

== Sports ==
- Game score, a baseball statistic
- Gezira Sporting Club, largest multi-sport facility in Egypt
- Ghana Super Cup, a football competition
- Girls' Sports Club, a women's sports club in Singapore 1929-1996
- Glenmore Sailing Club, in Calgary, Alberta, Canada
- Goslarer SC 08, a German football club
- Gulf South Conference, a college athletic conference in the southeastern United States

== Other uses ==
- Gascon language, spoken in France
- General Santos City, a city in the Philippines
- Glenwood Springs station, a railway station in Colorado, United States
- Greater Sylhet Development and Welfare Council in UK, a British charity
- Green Schools Campaign, a renewable energy campaign in Malaysia
- Guided Self-Change
- Girl Scout Cookies
- Gulf Stream Council, of the Boy Scouts of America
