= Unit cohesion in the United States military =

American military unit concept

Unit cohesion in the United States military has been the subject of dispute and political debate since World War II as the United States military has expanded the categories of citizens it accepts as servicemembers. Unit cohesion is a military concept, defined by one former United States Chief of staff in the early 1980s as "the bonding together of soldiers in such a way as to sustain their will and commitment to each other, the unit, and mission accomplishment, despite combat or mission stress". The concept lacks a consensus definition among military analysts, sociologists, and psychologists.

== Factors affecting unit cohesion ==
Henning 2009, pp. 1–16 has identified some factors in unit cohesion:

- the units (squad, platoon, or company level) are small enough that key NCOs (E5-E9) can influence others,
- the Unit Manning System emphasizes the stability of units and their families at the brigade level, as structured in Army Force Generation ARFORGEN, rather than the Individual Replacement System in use since before the Vietnam era
- in the WWII and Korean War eras, once a soldier was wounded or separated from his unit, there was little chance of returning to his unit and
- the Stop Loss pay provision of $500 per month was instituted to encourage personnel to remain with their units during combat deployments.

== Race ==
Prior to US Executive Order 9981, issued on July 26, 1948 by President Harry S. Truman, the American military was segregated. Opponents of racial integration frequently alleged that integrating the armed forces would have detrimental effects on unit cohesion.

== Women in combat ==
Brian Mitchell, in his article "Women Make Poor Soldiers" (excerpted from his 1989 book "Weak Link: The Feminization of the American Military"), expressed concern that placing women in combat lowers unit cohesion, either due to sexual relationships taking priority over group loyalty, or because men would feel obliged to be more protective of women than other men. Mitchell's view was harshly criticized in a New York Times review, which stated the book was "spoiled by intemperate allegations and a supercilious tone" and lacked sourcing for statements.

== Fraternization ==
Air Force Instruction 36-2909 on Professional and Unprofessional Relationships says:

Dating, courtship, and close friendships between men and women are subject to the same policy considerations as are other relationships. Like any personal [*pg 1038] relationship, they become matters of official concern when they adversely affect morale, discipline, unit cohesion, respect for authority, or mission accomplishment. Members must recognize that these relationships can adversely affect morale and discipline, even when the members are not in the same chain of command or unit. The formation of such relationships between superiors and subordinates within the same chain of command or supervision is prohibited because such relationships invariably raise the perception of favoritism or misuse of position and erode morale, discipline and unit cohesion.

== Sexual orientation ==
Conservative commentary in the U.S. has taken the view that the service of gays in the military is deleterious to essential components of unit cohesion, such as moral and discipline. Urvashi Vaid, criticizing the "Don't ask, don't tell" policy in 1995, called unit cohesion a euphemism for "heterosexual male bonding" and wrote that "the essence of male bonding lay in the forcible suppression of undercurrents of homosexual desire."

== Bibliography ==
- Henning, Charles A. (2009), U. S. Military Stop Loss Program: Key Questions and Answers, Congressional Research Service, ISBN 9781437929621
- Schaub, Gary Jr. (2010). "Unit Cohesion and the Impact of DADT" Strategic Studies Quarterly Vol. 4, No. 3 (Fall 2010), pages 85–101
- Tarak Barkawi, Christopher Dandeker, Melissa Wells-Petry and Elizabeth Kier, "Rights and Fights: Sexual Orientation and Military Effectiveness," International Security, vol. 24, no. 1 (Summer 1999), 181-201
