= GSCC =

GSCC is an initialism. It may refer to:

- Gardner Steel Conference Center, an academic building of the University of Pittsburgh
- General Social Care Council, a former non-departmental public body of the Department of Health in the United Kingdom
- Golden Strip Career Center, a vocational school in South Carolina
- Green Senatorial Campaign Committee, a committee to support the Green Party of the United States's candidates for Senate

== See also ==
- GCSS (disambiguation)
- GSC (disambiguation)
