= HBCT Warfighters' Forum =

The Heavy Brigade Combat Team (HBCT) Warfighters’ Forum (HWfF) is one of three BCT Warfighters’ Forums established at the direction of the Commanding General, United States Army Forces Command (FORSCOM), as a collaborative effort of the United States Army’s three Army Commands - United States Army Forces Command (FORSCOM), Training and Doctrine Command (TRADOC), and Army Material Command (AMC) in 2008 to create web-based knowledge networks that allow brigade combat teams to share their tacit and explicit knowledge in their ongoing preparations for global missions.

== History ==
The Warfighters' Forums (WfF) initiative is a web-based knowledge network established to enhance training, readiness, leader development and collaboration and information sharing among Brigade Combat Teams (BCT) and functional and multifunctional brigades. The program leverages upon the senior mentor roles performed by corps and Center of Excellence (CoE) commanders who integrate the functions of the WfF into staff organizations, internal battle rhythms, and routine interactive sessions with subordinate commanders world-wide. The WfF initiative recognizes the imperative to provide a proactive means to promote collaboration, share ideas, and find solutions to common problems across the Army, and to learn, innovate, decide, and act faster than our adversaries while operating in a condition of persistent conflict.

The HWfF was officially established January 15, 2008, in accordance with the BCT Warfighters’ Forum Charter and FORSCOM directives. The charter frames the concept of the overarching Warfighters’ Forum initiative and is signed by the commanding generals of the three Army Commands.

The mission of each forum, within its respective combat formation, is to enhance BCT leader, leader team, and unit training and operations throughout the Army Force Generation (ARFORGEN) process…^{1}

Over the course of 2008, FORSCOM issued orders further refining the BCT WfF initiative. This included FORSCOM Command Training Guidance-Training under Army Force Generation (ARFORGEN). An amendment to the original charter in December 2008 formally expanded the initiative to encompass forums in the Training and Doctrine Command (TRADOC) that serve an Army-wide audience encompassing functional and multifunctional brigades.

Several WfF working groups and boards were established in December 2008 to formally assist the ACOM commander’s governance and oversight of the FORSCOM, TRADOC and AMC forums.

Warfighters’ Forum Working Group – Each ACOM convenes an internal group of key stakeholders to which their respective WfF is a standing member to address issues, operational concerns and provide routine updates to the ACOM headquarters to which they belong. The HWfF is a standing member of the FORSCOM WfF Action Officer Working Group (AOWG) which meets monthly. The AOWG is chaired by the FORSCOM G3/5/7 Strategic Initiatives Division, Knowledge Management Branch Chief. TRADOC maintains its own similar working group for its functional and multifunctional WfFs.

Warfighters’ Forum Board of Directors (BoD) – A jointly convened, quarterly board chaired by the FORSCOM G3/5/7 Strategic Initiatives Division at the Colonel-level to address concerns raised by the three ACOM working groups and represented by principals from each of the ACOM-level commands (FORSCOM, TRADOC and AMC).

The Warfighters’ Forum Executive Directors’ Steering Committee (EDSC) is a quarterly scheduled council of general officers with oversight of their respective WfF for the purpose of addressing issues, proposed initiatives and resolution of topics of mutual interest nominated by the BoD in advance of the annually held 4-Star Executive Council (EC). Principal attendees include the one and two-star general officers or Senior Executive Service and Chief Knowledge Officers (CKO) from each of the BCT, TRADOC CoE, AMC, and AMEDD-C WfFs.

The Warfighters’ Forum 4-Star Executive Council (EC), held annually, is the principal governing body and the means for ACOM Commanding Generals to be updated on the developmental progress of the WfF initiative, provide ACOM-level guidance to the effort and provide azimuth and intent to shape the initiative's direction.

== Organization ==
The III Corps Commanding General is designated as the HWfF Senior Mentor. His Deputy serves as the HWfF’s Executive Director. The HWfF itself is organized with an Army Colonel as the Director, a Lieutenant Colonel as Deputy Director, Non-commissioned officers and Department of the Army civilians supporting the daily operations.

== Key Features of HWfF ==
The HWfF is mandated to establish and maintain two separate web presences providing HBCT and community members with both unclassified/For Official Use Only and classified web portals. Both portals are accessible to HWfF members through Army Common Access Card (for unclassified/FOUO) or Army provided classified email accounts. General public access is restricted due to the sensitive nature of most of the information found on the HWfF web sites. The portals provide explicit and tacit knowledge exchange as a way to keep the HBCT community informed. HWfF Unclassified Portal (AKO account and Common Access Card required to log in)

A bi-weekly HWfF newsletter is published as a means to provide HBCT community with informational highlights that are of interest to their individual, collective and professional training efforts as well as report on activities, articles and news occurring throughout the HBCT community.

HWfF Senior Mentor Symposium. In its capacity for encouraging HBCT leaders to share their tacit knowledge, unit lessons learned from ongoing and recent deployments, and discussions among operational commanders the HWfF hosts regularly scheduled on-line symposiums hosted by the forum’s senior commander, the III Corps Commanding General or his Deputy, and currently occur every 6-weeks using the Defense Connect Online-Secret (DCO-S) collaborative tools suite.

Post-Combat Leader Interviews (PCLI) were first held in April 2009, with the HWfF endeavouring to interview returning HBCT leadership as one of many ways being used throughout the Army to capture the leaders’ experiences, observations, lessons and professional opinions of how they and their unit performed during their phased movement through the Army Force Generation (ARFORGEN) processes (Reset, Train/ Ready, Available). One to two hour video-taped sessions with brigade, battalion and company-level leaders are conducted by HWfF staff and made available for view or download on the HWfF portal.
