= GCSS =

GCSS may refer to:

- Game Critter Super-Squad!, a comic strip
- GEWEX Cloud System Study, a meteorological study by the Global Energy and Water Exchanges
- Global Combat Support System and GCSS-Army, a framework for managing military logistics
- Government Comprehensive Secondary School, Port Harcourt, Rivers State, Nigeria
- Grand Cross of the Order of St. Sylvester, a class in one of the orders of knighthood of the Holy See
- Gwinnett College - Sandy Springs, Lilburn, Georgia, United States

== See also ==
- GCCS (disambiguation)
- GCS (disambiguation)
- GSCC (disambiguation)
