= Reorganization plan of United States Army =

United States Army modernization and reorganization plan from 2006 to 2016

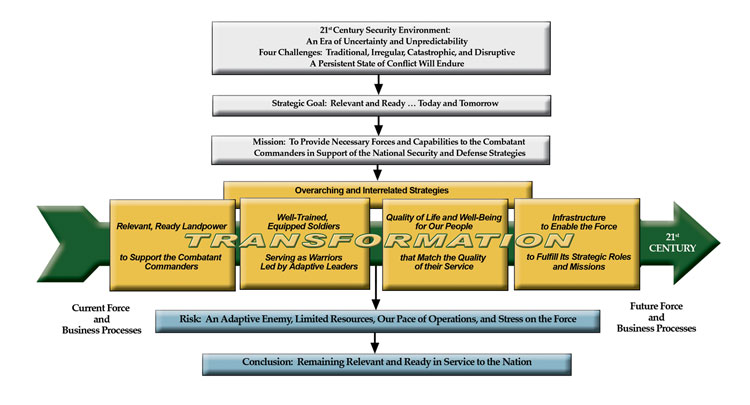
Graphic legend of Army Transformation (Note: In Force modernization, Deputy Chiefs of Staff G-8 and G-3/5/7 sit on the Army Requirements Oversight Council (AROC), to advise the Chief of Staff of the Army (CSA). The commander, AFC is responsible for Force design.: The Army's Force management model begins with a projection of the Future operating environment, in terms of resources: political, military, economic, social, information, infrastructure, physical environment, and the time available to bring the Current army to bear on the situation.; The AROC serves as a discussion forum of these factors.; The relevant strategy is provided by the Army's leadership.; A DOTMLPF analysis models the factors necessary to change the Current force into a relevant Future force.; A JCIDS process identifies the gaps in capability between Current and Future force.; A Force design to meet the materiel gaps is underway.; An organization with the desired capabilities (manpower, materiel, training) is brought to bear on each gap.; AR 5-22 lists the Force modernization proponent for each Army branch, which can be a CoE or Branch proponent leader.; Staff uses a Synchronization meeting before seeking approval —HTAR Force Management 3-2b: "Managing change in any large, complex organization requires the synchronization of many interrelated processes".; A budget request is submitted to Congress.; The resources are "dictated by Congress".; Approved requests then await resource deliveries which then become available to the combatant commanders.)

The reorganization plan of the United States Army was implemented from 2006 to 2016 under the direction of the Brigade Modernization Command. This effort formally began in 2006 when General Peter Schoomaker (the 35th Army Chief of Staff) was given the support to move the Army from its Cold War divisional orientation to a full-spectrum capability with fully manned, equipped and trained brigades; this effort was completed by the end of 2016. It has been the most comprehensive reorganization since World War II and included modular combat brigades, support brigades, and command headquarters, as well as rebalancing the active and reserve components.

The plan was first proposed in 1999 by Army Chief of Staff General Eric Shinseki but was bitterly opposed internally by the Army.

== Origin and initial design ==
In the 1980s the "Army of Excellence" reorganization had been the last fundamental reorganization of the Army's divisions.

Before Schoomaker's appointment, the Army was organized around large, mostly mechanized, divisions of around 15,000 soldiers each, with the aim of being able to fight in two major theatres simultaneously. Under the new plan, the Army would be organized around modular brigades of 3,000–4,000 soldiers, intended to deploy continuously in different parts of the world and to organize the Army closer to the way it fights.

An additional 30,000 soldiers were recruited as a short-term measure to ease the structural changes, although a permanent end-strength change was not expected because of fears of funding cuts. This forced the Army to pay for the additional personnel from procurement and readiness accounts. Up to 60% of the defense budget is spent on personnel; at the time, each 10,000 soldiers cost roughly US$1.4 billion annually.

In 2002, the Belfer Center for Science and International Affairs held a key conference: the "Belfer Center Conference on Military Transformation". Co-sponsored by the United States Army War College and the Dwight D. Eisenhower National Security Series, on November 22 and 23, it brought together present and former defense officials and military commanders to assess the Department of Defense's progress in achieving a "transformation" of U.S. military capabilities.

In 2004, the United States Army Forces Command (FORSCOM), which commands most active and reserve forces based in the Continental United States, was tasked with supervising the modular transformation of its subordinate structure.

In March 2004, a contract was awarded to Anteon Corporation (later a part of General Dynamics) to provide "Modularity Coordination Cells" (MCCs) to each transforming corps, division and brigade within FORSCOM. Each MCC contained a team of functional area specialists who provided direct, ground-level support to the unit. The MCCs were coordinated by the Anteon office in Atlanta, Georgia.

The Secretary of the Army approved implementing "Army Force Generation" (ARFORGEN), a transformational force generation model, in 2006. ARFORGEN model concept development began in the summer of 2004 and received its final approval from the Army's senior leadership in early 2006.

In 2007 a new deployment scheme known as Grow the Army was adopted that enabled the Army to carry out continuous operations. The plan was modified several times including an expansion of troop numbers in 2007 and changes to the number of modular brigades. On 25 June 2013, plans were announced to disband 13 modular brigade combat teams (BCTs) and expand the remaining brigades with an extra maneuver battalion, extra fires batteries, and an engineer battalion.

In 2016, the Army force generation process ARFORGEN was sidelined because it relied mostly on the Active Army, in favor of the total force policy, which includes the Reserve and National Guard; in the new model, the total force could have fallen to 980,000 by 2018, subject to DoD's Defense Strategic Guidance to the Joint Staff. By 15 June 2017, the Department of the Army approved an increase in the Active Army's end-strength from 475,000 to 476,000. The total Army end-strength increases to 1.018 million.

== Planning process, evolution, and transformation ==
The commander-in-chief directs the planning process, through guidance to the Army by the Secretary of Defense. Every year, Army Posture Statements by the Secretary of the Army and the Chief of Staff of the Army summarize their assessment (Note: 2015 Army Operating Concept (AOC): "Win in a Complex World") of the Army's ability to respond to world events, and also to transform for the future. In support of transformation for the future, TRADOC, upon the advice of the Army's stakeholders, has assembled 20 warfighting challenges. These challenges are under evaluation during annual Army warfighting assessments, such as AWA 17.1, held in October 2016. AWA 17.1 was an assessment by 5,000 US Soldiers, Special Operations Forces, Airmen, and Marines, as well as by British, Australian, Canadian, Danish, and Italian troops. For example, reach-back is among the capabilities being assessed; when under attack in an unexpected location, a Soldier on the move might use Warfighter Information Network-Tactical (WIN-T). At the halt, a light Transportable Tactical Command Communications (T2C2 Lite) system could reach back to a mobile command post, to communicate the unexpected situation to higher echelons, a building block in multi-domain operations.

=== Implementation and current status ===
Grow the Army was a transformation and re-stationing initiative of the United States Army which began in 2007 and was scheduled to be completed by fiscal year 2013. The initiative was designed to grow the army by almost 75,000 soldiers, while realigning a large portion of the force in Europe to the continental United States in compliance with the 2005 Base Realignment and Closure suggestions. This grew the force from 42 Brigade Combat Teams (BCTs) and 75 modular support brigades in 2007 to 45 Brigade Combat Teams and 83 modular support brigades by 2013.

On 25 June 2013, 38th Army Chief of Staff General Raymond T. Odierno announced plans to disband 13 brigade combat teams and reduce troop strengths by 80,000 soldiers. While the number of BCTs will be reduced, the size of remaining BCTs will increase, on average, to about 4,500 soldiers. That will be accomplished, in many cases, by moving existing battalions and other assets from existing BCTs into other brigades. Two brigade combat teams in Germany had already been deactivated and a further 10 brigade combat teams slated for deactivation were announced by General Odierno on 25 June. (An additional brigade combat team was announced for deactivation 6 November 2014.) At the same time the maneuver battalions from the disbanded brigades will be used to augment armored and infantry brigade combat teams with a third maneuver battalion and expanded brigades fires capabilities by adding a third battery to the existing fires battalions. Furthermore, all brigade combat teams—armored, infantry and Stryker—will gain a Brigade Engineer Battalion, with "gap-crossing" and route-clearance capability.

On 6 November 2014, it was reported that the 1st Armored Brigade Combat Team, 2nd Infantry Division, currently stationed in South Korea, was to be deactivated in June 2015 and be replaced by a succession of U.S.-based brigade combat teams, which are to be rotated in and out, at the same nine-month tempo as practiced by the Army from 2001 to 2014.

Eleven brigades were inactivated by 2015. The remaining brigades as of 2015 are listed below. On 16 March 2016, the Deputy Commanding General (DCG) of FORSCOM announced that the brigades would now also train to move their equipment to their new surge location as well as to train for the requirements of their next deployment.

By 2018, Secretary of the Army Mark Esper noted that even though the large deployments to Iraq and Afghanistan had ceased, at any given time, three of the Armored Brigade Combat Teams are deployed to EUCOM, CENTCOM, and INDOPACOM, respectively, while two Infantry Brigade Combat Teams are deployed to Iraq, and Afghanistan, respectively.

[At any given time,] there are more than 100,000 Soldiers deployed around the world — Secretary of the Army Mark Esper

In 2019, Esper asserted that the planning efforts, including Futures Command, the SFABs, and the Decisive Action readiness training of the BCTs are preparing the Army for competition with both near-peer and regional powers. The Army and Marine Corps have issued "clear explanations and guidance for the 429 articles of the Geneva Conventions".

The Budget Control Act could potentially restrict funds by 2020. (Note: The 2020 Budget request for defense spending will trigger budget cuts in the face of the threat of sequestration from the Budget Control Act of 2011. This sets up up political clashes over spending caps for fiscal year 2020, triggering tandem increases in both defense spending and domestic spending. The history of government spending since the Budget Control Act of 2011 suggests that the deficit will be increased in response.) By 2024–2025, the Fiscal Year Development Plan (FYDP) will have reallocated $10 billion more into development of the top six modernization priorities, (Note: The capabilities as prioritized by the 39th Chief of Staff, will use subject matter experts in the realms of requirements, acquisition, science and technology, test, resourcing, costing, and sustainment, using Cross Functional Teams (CFTs) for: 1. Improved long-range precision fires (artillery):—(Fort Sill, Oklahoma) Lead: BG John Rafferty ... PEO Ammunition (AMMO); 2. Next-generation combat vehicle—(Detroit Arsenal, Warren, Michigan) Lead: BG Ross Coffman ... PEO Ground Combat Systems (GCS); 3. Vertical lift platforms—(Redstone Arsenal, Huntsville, Alabama) Lead: BG Wally Rugen ... PEO Aviation (AVN); 4. Mobile and expeditionary (usable in ground combat) communications network (Aberdeen Proving Ground, Maryland); 1. Network Command, Control, Communications and Intelligence— Lead: MG Pete Gallagher ... PEO Command Control Communications Tactical (C3T); 2. Assured Position Navigation and Timing— (Redstone Arsenal, Huntsville, Alabama) Lead: William B. Nelson, SES; 5. Air and missile defense—(Fort Sill, Oklahoma) Lead: BG Brian Gibson, ... PEO Missiles and Space (M&S); 6. Soldier lethality; 1. Soldier Lethality—(Fort Benning, Georgia) Lead: BG David M. Hodne ... PEO Soldier; 2. Synthetic Training Environment —(Orlando, Florida) Lead: MG Maria Gervais ... PEO Simulation, Training, & Instrumentation (STRI); Above, 'dotted line' relationship (i.e., coordination) is denoted by a ' ... ') taking those funds from legacy spending budgets.

== Reorganization plans by unit type ==
The Army has now been organized around modular brigades of 3,000–4,000 soldiers each, with the aim of being able to deploy continuously in different parts of the world, and effectively organizing the Army closer to the way it fights. The fact that this modernization is now in place has been acknowledged by the renaming of the 'Brigade Modernization Command' to the "U.S. Army Joint Modernization Command," on 16 February 2017.

By 2021 the Army of 2030 was envisioned to consist of Brigades for the close fight, Divisions for Large scale combat operations, Corps for enduring, sustained operations, and Theater-scale commands. See Transformation of the United States Army

=== Modular combat brigades ===
Modular combat brigades are self-contained combined arms formations. They are standardized formations across the active and reserve components, meaning an Armored BCT at Fort Cavazos is the same as one at Fort Stewart. (Note: One consequence of a standardized BCT is that actions performed by one BCT can be made in behalf of a successor BCT. Thus pre-positioned stocks can aid in the rapidity of deployment:)

Reconnaissance plays a large role in the new organizational designs. The Army felt the acquisition of the target was the weak link in the chain of finding, fixing, closing with, and destroying the enemy. The Army felt that it had already sufficient lethal platforms to take out the enemy and thus the number of reconnaissance units in each brigade was increased. (Note: The Army is introducing drones in its combat aviation brigades in order to increase its reconnaissance capability.) The brigades sometimes depend on joint fires from the Air Force and Navy to accomplish their mission. As a result, the amount of field artillery has been reduced in the brigade design.

The three types of BCTs are Armored Brigade Combat Teams (ABCTs), Infantry Brigade Combat Teams (IBCTs) (includes Light, Air Assault and Airborne units), and Stryker Brigade Combat Teams (SBCTs).

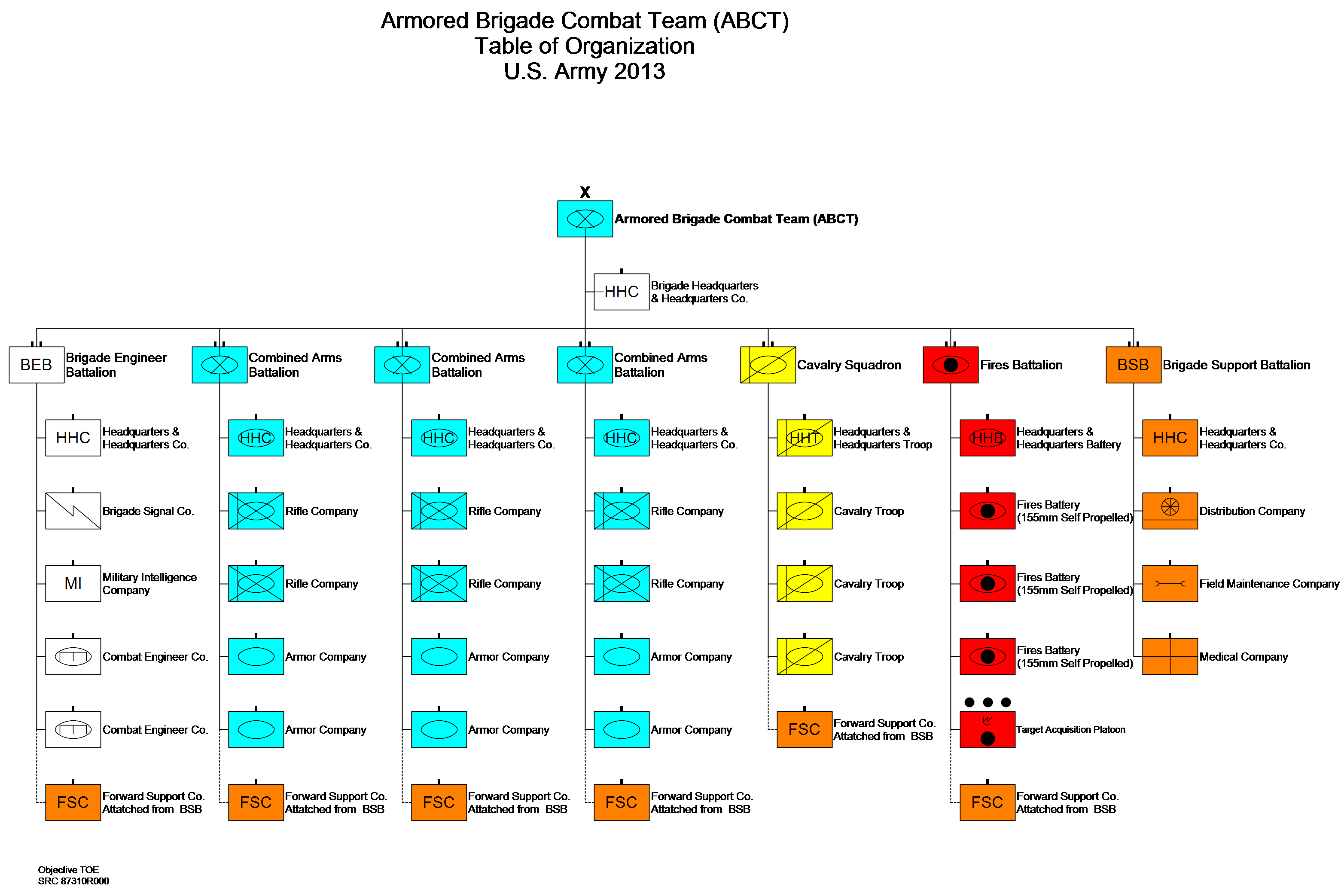
Armored Brigade structure

Armored Brigade Combat Teams, or ABCTs consist of 4,743 troops. This includes the third maneuver battalion as laid out in 2013. The changes announced by the U.S. army on 25 June 2013, include adding a third maneuver battalion to the brigade, a second engineer company to a new Brigade Engineer Battalion, a third battery to the FA battalion, and reducing the size of each battery from 8 to 6 guns. These changes will also increase the number of troops in the affected battalions and also increase the total troops in the brigade. Since the brigade has more organic units, the command structure includes a deputy commander (in addition to the traditional executive officer) and a larger staff capable of working with civil affairs, special operations, psychological operations, air defense, and aviation units. An Armored BCT consists of:

- the brigade headquarters and headquarters company (HHC): 43 officers, 17 warrant officers, 125 enlisted personnel – total: 185 soldiers. The commander and deputy commander each have a personal M2A3 Infantry Fighting Vehicle. (Note: Armored Multi-Purpose Vehicle (AMPV): The AMPV will replace vehicles for: 522 general purpose; 993 mission command; 216 medical treatment; 790 medical evacuation; 386 mortar carrier)
- the Brigade Engineer Battalion (BEB) (formerly Brigade Special Troops Battalion (BSTB)), consisted of a headquarters company, signal company, military intelligence company with a TUAV platoon and two combat engineer companies (A and B company). The former BSTB fielded 28 officers, 6 warrant officers, 470 enlisted personnel – total: 504 soldiers. Each of the combat engineer company fields 13× M2A2 Bradley Fighting Vehicle Operation Desert Storm-Engineer, 1× M113A3 Armored Personnel Carrier, 3× M1150 assault breacher vehicle, 1× M9 armored combat earthmover, and 2× M104 heavy assault bridge.
- a Cavalry (formerly Armed Reconnaissance) Squadron, consisting of a headquarters troop (HHT) and three reconnaissance troops and one armored troop. The HHT fields 2× M3A3 cavalry fighting vehicles and 3× M7A3 Bradley fire support vehicles, while each reconnaissance troop fields 7× M3A3 CFVs. The squadron fields 35 officers and 385 enlisted personnel – total: 424 soldiers.
- three identical combined arms battalions, flagged as a battalion of an infantry, armored or cavalry regiment. Each battalion consists of a headquarters and headquarters company, two tank companies and two mechanized infantry companies. The battalions field 48 officers and 580 enlisted personnel each – total: 628 soldiers. The HHC fields 1× M1A2 main battle tank, 1× M2A3 infantry fighting vehicle, 3× M3A3 cavalry fighting vehicles, 4× M7A3 fire support vehicles and 4× M1064 mortar carriers with M120 120 mm mortars. Each of the two tank companies fields 14× M1A2 main battle tanks, while each mechanized infantry company fields 14× M2A3 infantry fighting vehicles. In 2016, the ABCT's combined arms battalions adopted a triangle structure, of two armored battalions (of two armored companies plus a single mechanized infantry company) plus a mechanized infantry battalion (of two mechanized companies and one armored company). This resulted in the reduction of two mechanized infantry companies; the deleted armored company was reflagged as a troop to the Cavalry Squadron.
- a Field Artillery battalion, consisting of a headquarters battery, two cannon batteries with 8× M109A6 self-propelled 155 mm howitzers each (the changes announced by the U.S. Army on 25 June 2013, include adding a third battery to the FA battalion, and reducing the size of each battery from 8 to 6 guns; these changes also increase the number of troops in the affected battalions and also increase the total troops in the Brigade), and a target acquisition platoon. 24 officers, 2 warrant officers, 296 enlisted personnel – total: 322 soldiers.
- a brigade support battalion (BSB), consisting of a headquarters, medical, distribution and maintenance company, plus six forward support companies, each of which support one of the three combined arms battalions, the cavalry squadron, the engineer battalion and the field artillery battalion. 61 officers, 14 warrant officers, 1,019 enlisted personnel – total: 1,094 soldiers.

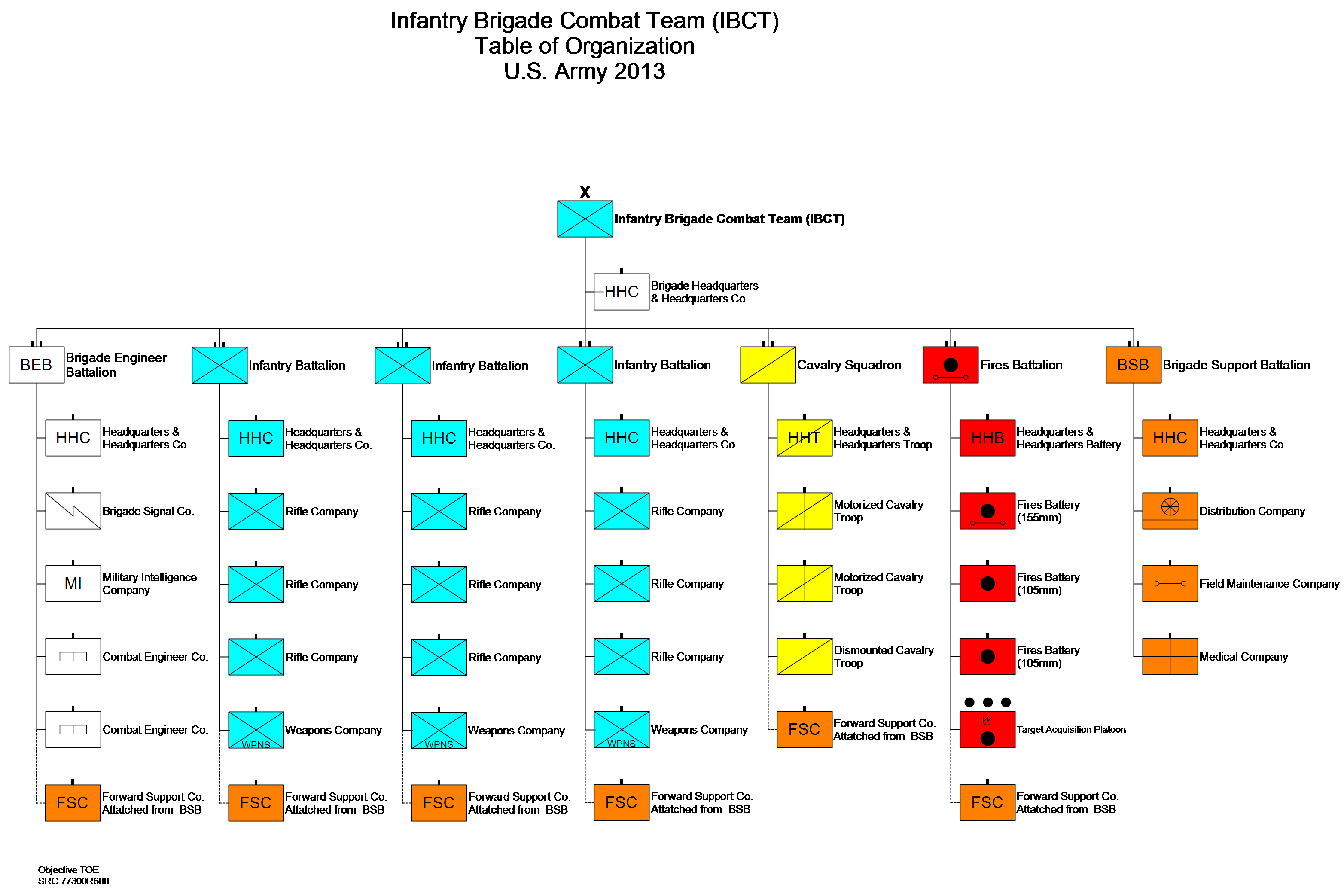
Infantry Brigade structure

Infantry Brigade Combat Team, or IBCTs, comprised around 3,300 soldiers, in the pre-2013 design, which did not include the 3rd maneuver battalion. The 2013 end-strength is now 4,413 Soldiers:

- Special Troops Battalion (now Brigade Engineer Battalion)
- Cavalry Squadron
- (2), later (3) Infantry Battalions
- Field Artillery Battalion
- Brigade Support Battalion

As of May 2025, all IBCTs will covert to Mobile Brigade Combat Teams, equipped with the M1301 infantry squad vehicle to enhance mobility.

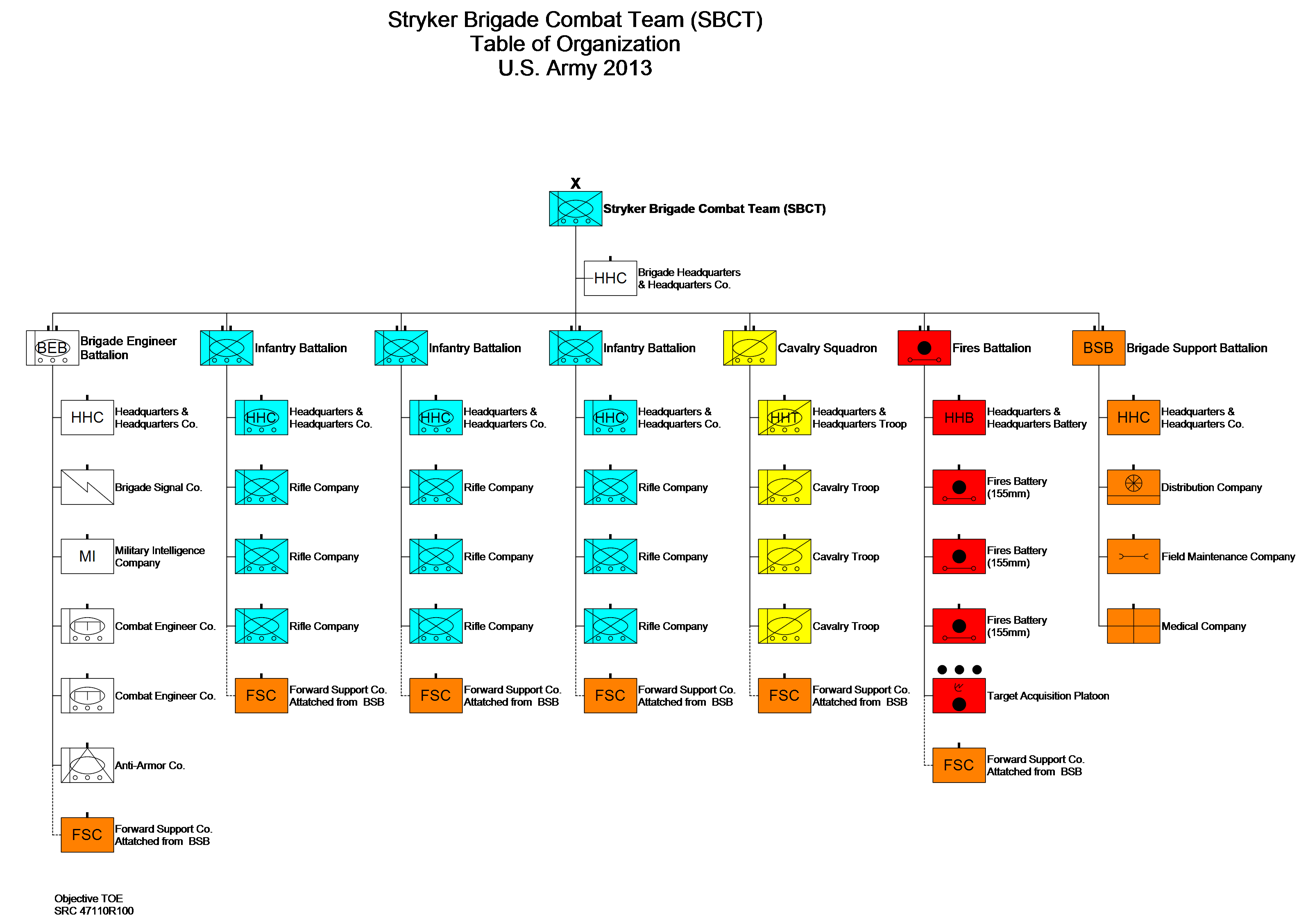
Stryker Brigade structure

Stryker Brigade Combat Team or SBCTs comprised about 3,900 soldiers, making it the largest of the three combat brigade constructs in the 2006 design, and over 4,500 Soldiers in the 2013 reform. Its design includes:

- Headquarters Company
- Cavalry Squadron (with three 14-vehicle, two-120 mm mortar reconnaissance troops plus a surveillance troop with UAVs and NBC detection capability)
- (3) Stryker infantry battalions (each with three rifle companies with 12 infantry-carrying vehicles, 3 mobile gun platforms, 2 120 mm mortars, and around 100 infantry dismounts each, plus an HHC with scout, mortar and medical platoons and a sniper section.)
- Engineer Company (folded into the Brigade Engineer Battalion) [An additional engineer company was added to the battalion in the 2013 reform]
- Signal Company (folded into the Brigade Engineer Battalion)
- Military Intelligence Company (with UAV platoon) (folded into the Brigade Engineer Battalion)
- Anti-tank company (9 TOW-equipped Stryker vehicles) (folded into the Brigade Engineer Battalion)
- Field Artillery Battalion (three 6-gun 155 mm Howitzer batteries, target acquisition platoon, and a joint fires cell)
- Brigade Support Battalion (headquarters, medical, maintenance, and distribution companies)

=== Modular support brigades ===
==== Combat support brigades ====
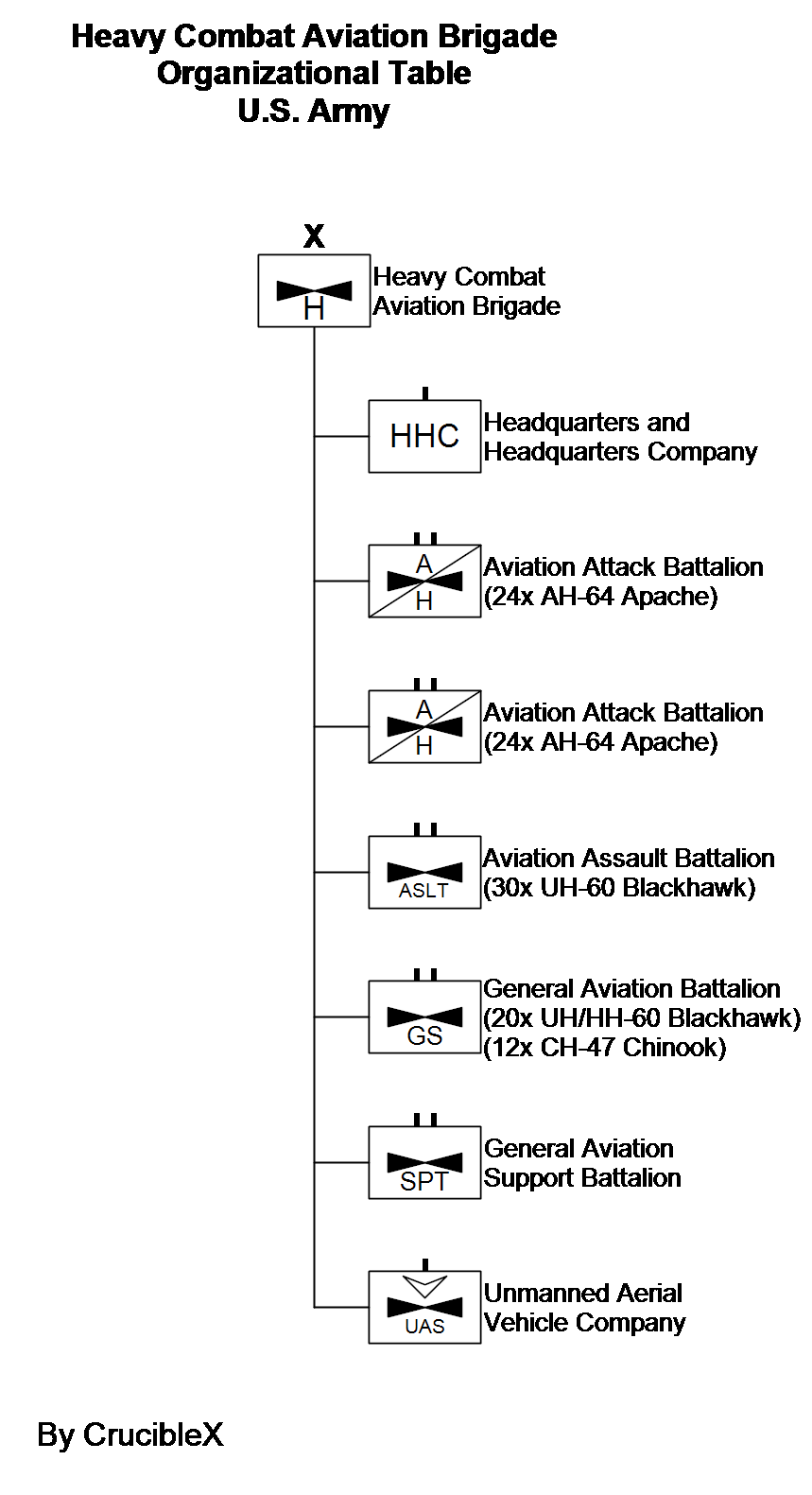
Heavy Combat Aviation Brigade Structure

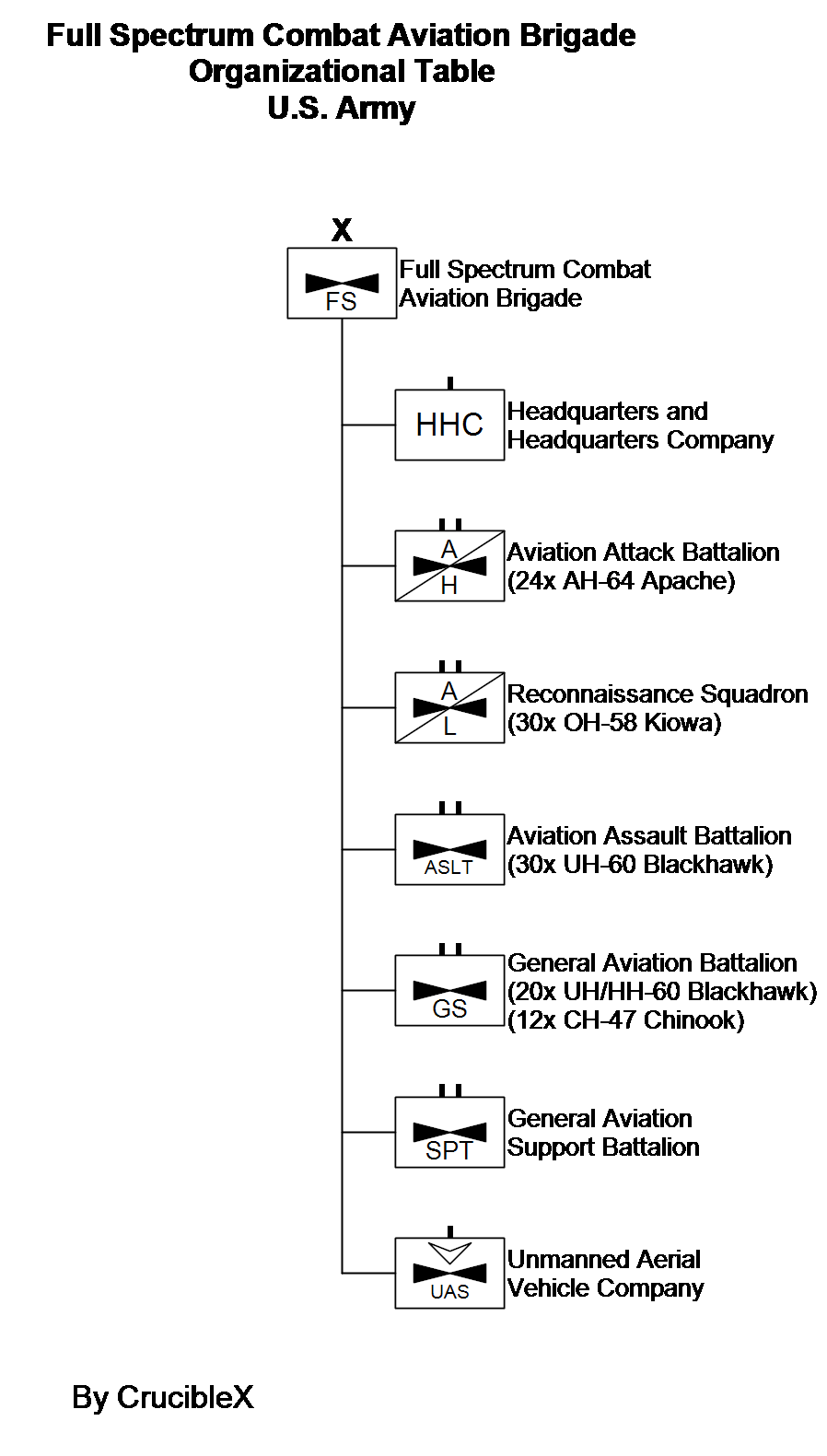
Full Spectrum Combat Aviation Brigade Structure

Similar modularity will exist for support units which fall into five types: Aviation, Fires (artillery), Battlefield Surveillance (intelligence), Maneuver Enhancement (engineers, signal, military police, chemical, and rear-area support), and Sustainment (logistics, medical, transportation, maintenance, etc.). In the past, artillery, combat support, and logistics support only resided at the division level and brigades were assigned those units only on a temporary basis when brigades transformed into "brigade combat teams" for particular deployments.

Combat Aviation Brigades are multi-functional, offering a combination of attack helicopters (i.e., Boeing AH-64 Apache), reconnaissance helicopters (i.e., OH-58 Kiowa), medium-lift helicopters (i.e., UH-60 Black Hawk), heavy-lift helicopters (i.e., CH-47 Chinook), and medical evacuation (MEDEVAC) capability. Aviation will not be organic to combat brigades but will continue to reside at the division-level due to resource constraints.

Heavy divisions (of which there are six) will have 48 Apaches, 38 Blackhawks, 12 Chinooks, and 12 Medevac helicopters in their aviation brigade. These are divided into two aviation attack battalions, an assault lift battalion, a general aviation support battalion. An aviation support battalion will have headquarters, refuelling/resupply, repair/maintenance, and communications companies. Light divisions will have aviation brigades with 60 armed reconnaissance helicopters and no Apaches, with the remaining structure the same. The remaining divisions will have aviation brigades with 30 armed reconnaissance helicopters and 24 Apaches, with the remaining structure the same. Ten Army Apache helicopter units will convert to heavy attack reconnaissance squadrons, with 12 RQ-7B Shadow drones apiece. The helicopters to fill out these large, combined-arms division-level aviation brigades comes from aviation units that used to reside at the corps-level.

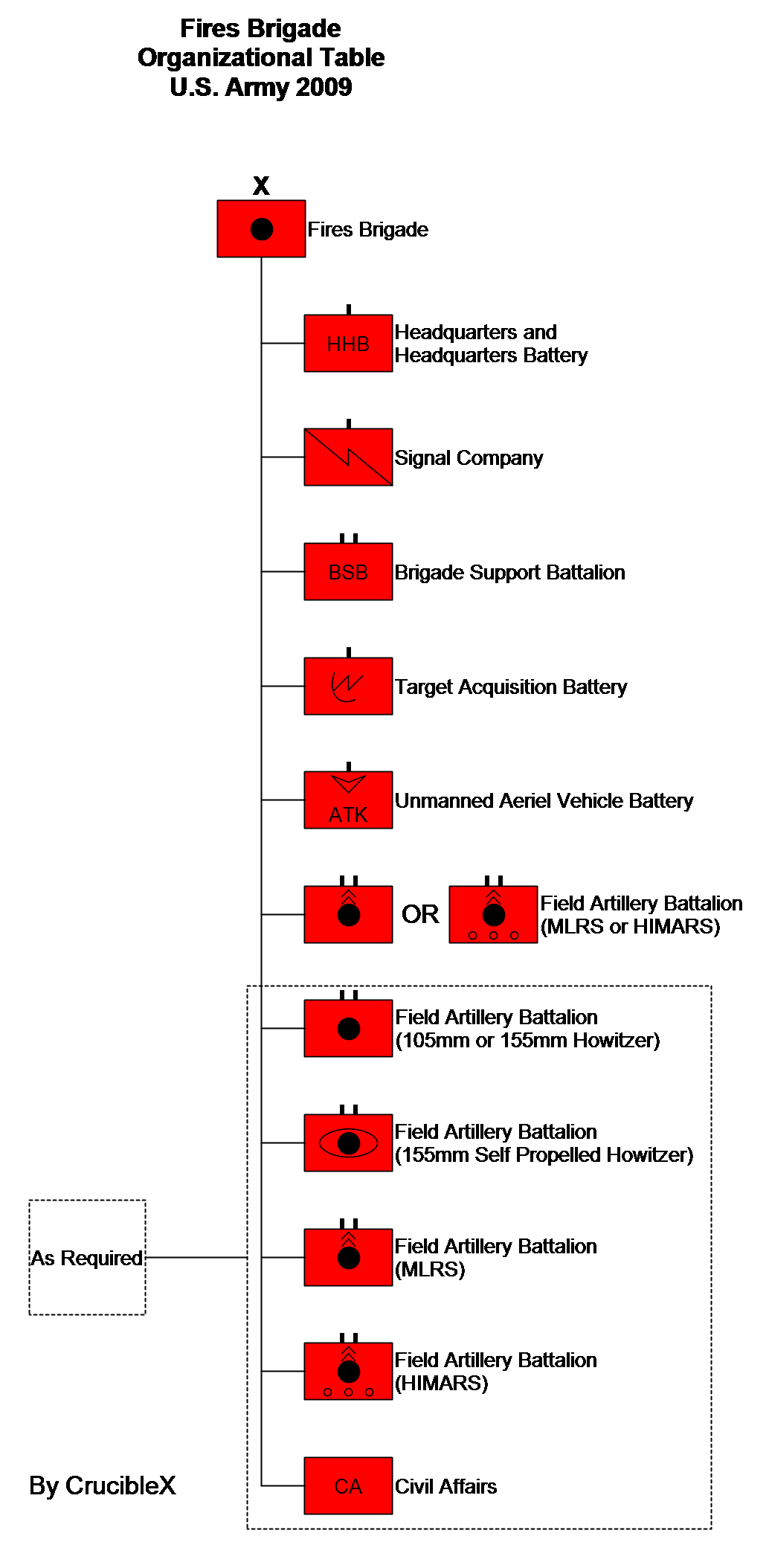
Fires Brigade Structure

Field Artillery Brigades (known as "Fires Brigades" prior to 2014) provide traditional artillery fire (M109 Paladin self-propelled howitzer, M270 MLRS and HIMARS rocket artillery) as well as information operations and non-lethal effects capabilities. After the 2013 reform, the expertise formerly embodied in the pre-2007 Division Artillery (DIVARTY) was formally re-instituted in the Division Artillery (DIVARTY) of 2015, with a colonel as commander. The operational Fires battalions will now report to this new formulation of DIVARTY, for training and operational Fires standards, as well as to the BCT.

Air Defense: The Army was no longer to provide an organic air defense artillery (ADA) battalion to its divisions as of 2007. Nine of the ten active component (AC) divisional ADA battalions and two of the eight reserve (ARNG) divisional ADA battalions will deactivate. The remaining AC divisional ADA battalion along with six ARNG divisional ADA battalions will be pooled at the Unit of Employment to provide on-call air and missile defense (AMD) protection. The pool of Army AMD resources will address operational requirements in a tailorable and timely manner without stripping assigned AMD capability from other missions. Maneuver short-range air defense (MSHORAD) with laser cannon prototypes fielding by 2020. But by 2015 the Division Artillery was restored.

Maneuver Enhancement Brigades are designed to be self-contained, and will command units such as chemical, military police, civil affairs units, and tactical units such as a maneuver infantry battalion. These formations are designed so that they can operate with coalition, or joint forces such as the Marine Corps, or can span the gap between modular combat brigades and other modular support brigades. (Note: In the 2013 reform, the active duty brigades are deactivating by 2015, leaving only the National Guard's, and the Reserve's, maneuver enhancement brigades.)

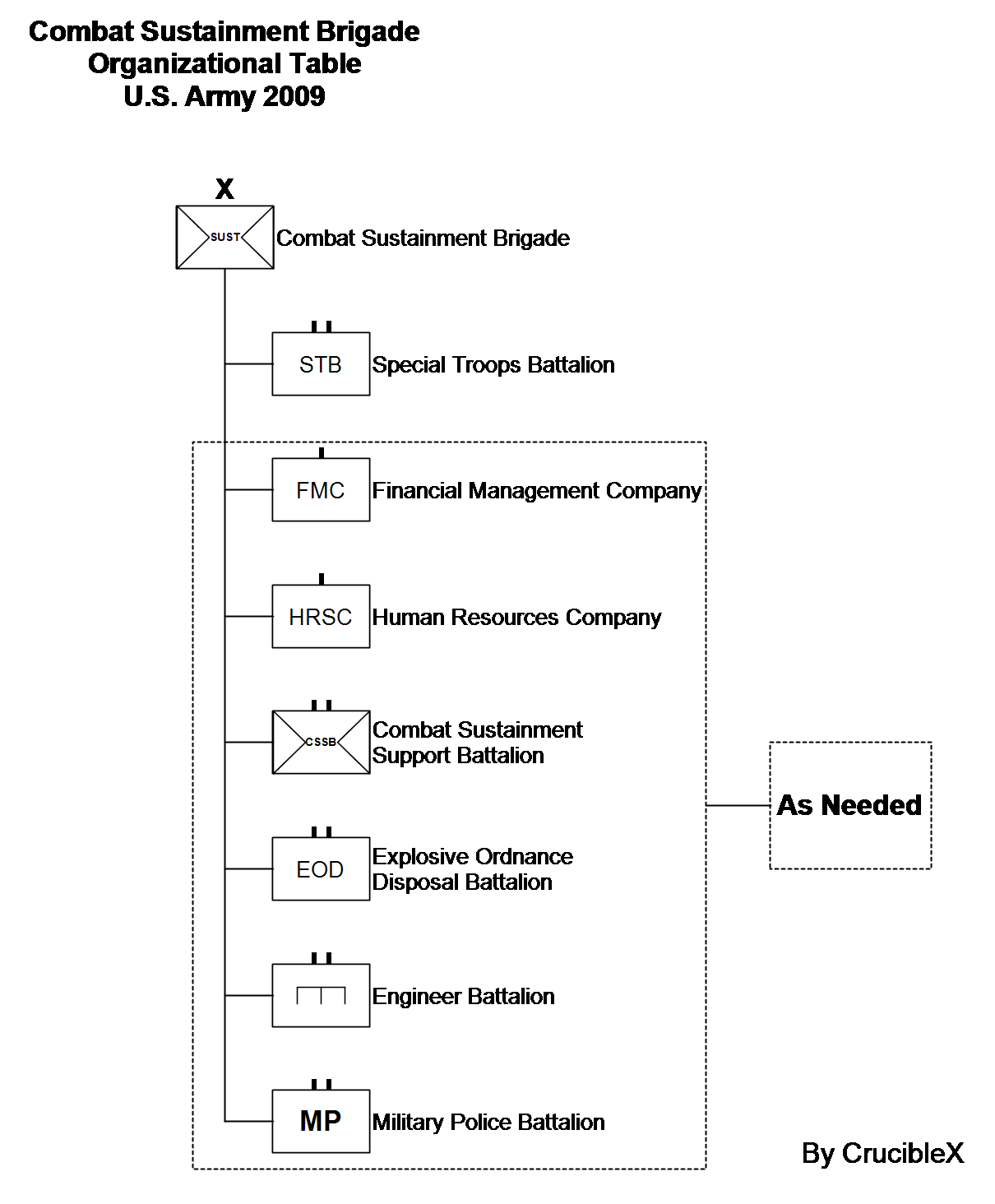
Combat Sustainment Brigade Structure

Sustainment Brigades provide echelon-above-brigade-level logistics. On its rotation to South Korea, 3rd ABCT, 1st Armored Division deployed its supply support activity (SSA) common authorized stockage list (CASL) as well. The CASL allows the ABCT to draw additional stocks beyond its pipeline of materiel from GCSS-A. The DoD-level Global Combat Support System includes an Army-level tool (GCSS-A), which runs on tablet computers with bar code readers which 92-A specialists use to enter and track materiel requests, as the materiel makes its way through the supply chain to the brigades. This additional information can then be used by GCSS-A to trigger resupply for Army pre-positioned stocks, typically by sea. The data in GCSS-Army is displayed on the Commander's Dashboard —Army Readiness-Common Operating Picture (AR-COP); this dashboard is also available to the commander at BCT, division, corps, and Army levels.

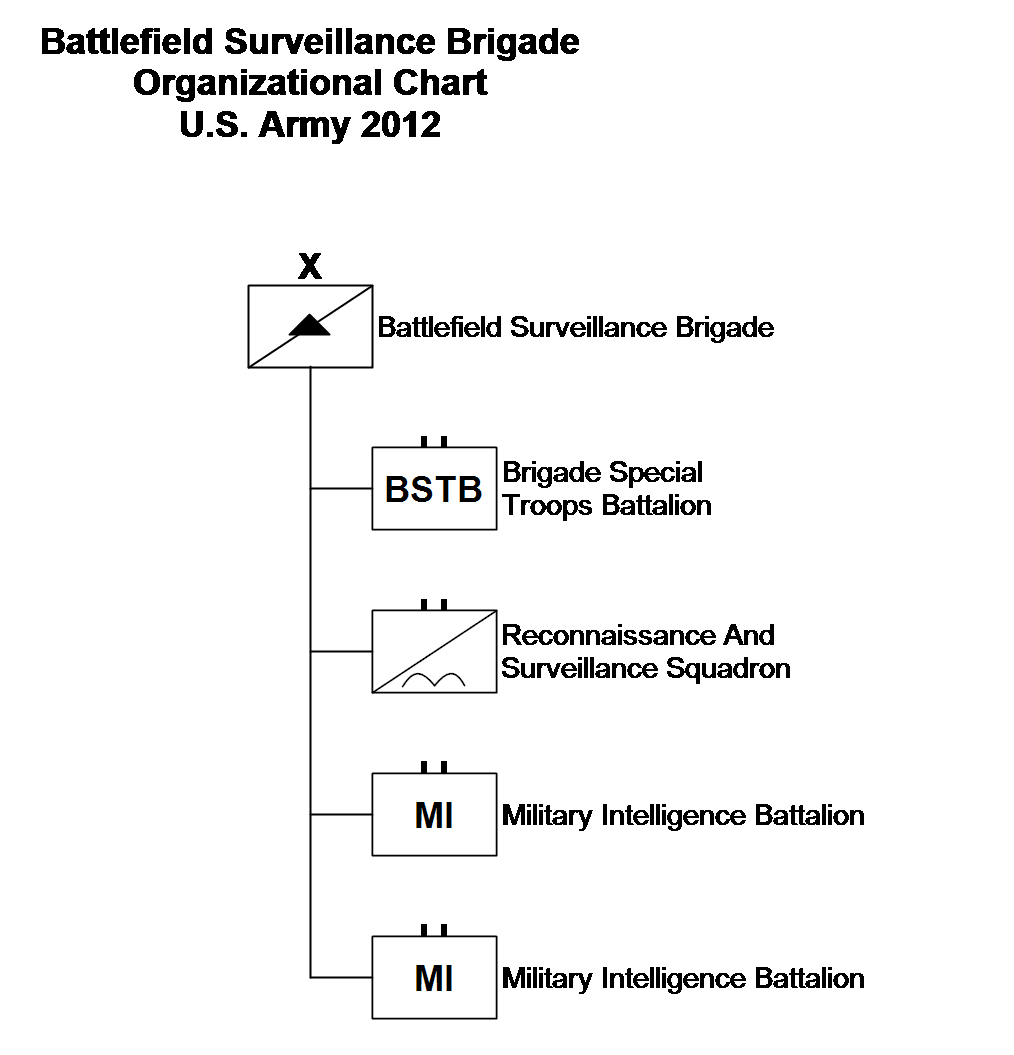
Battlefield Surveillance Brigade Structure

The former Battlefield Surveillance Brigades, now denoted Military Intelligence Brigades (Expeditionary), will offer additional UAVs and long-term surveillance detachments. Each of the three active duty brigades is attached to an Army Corps.

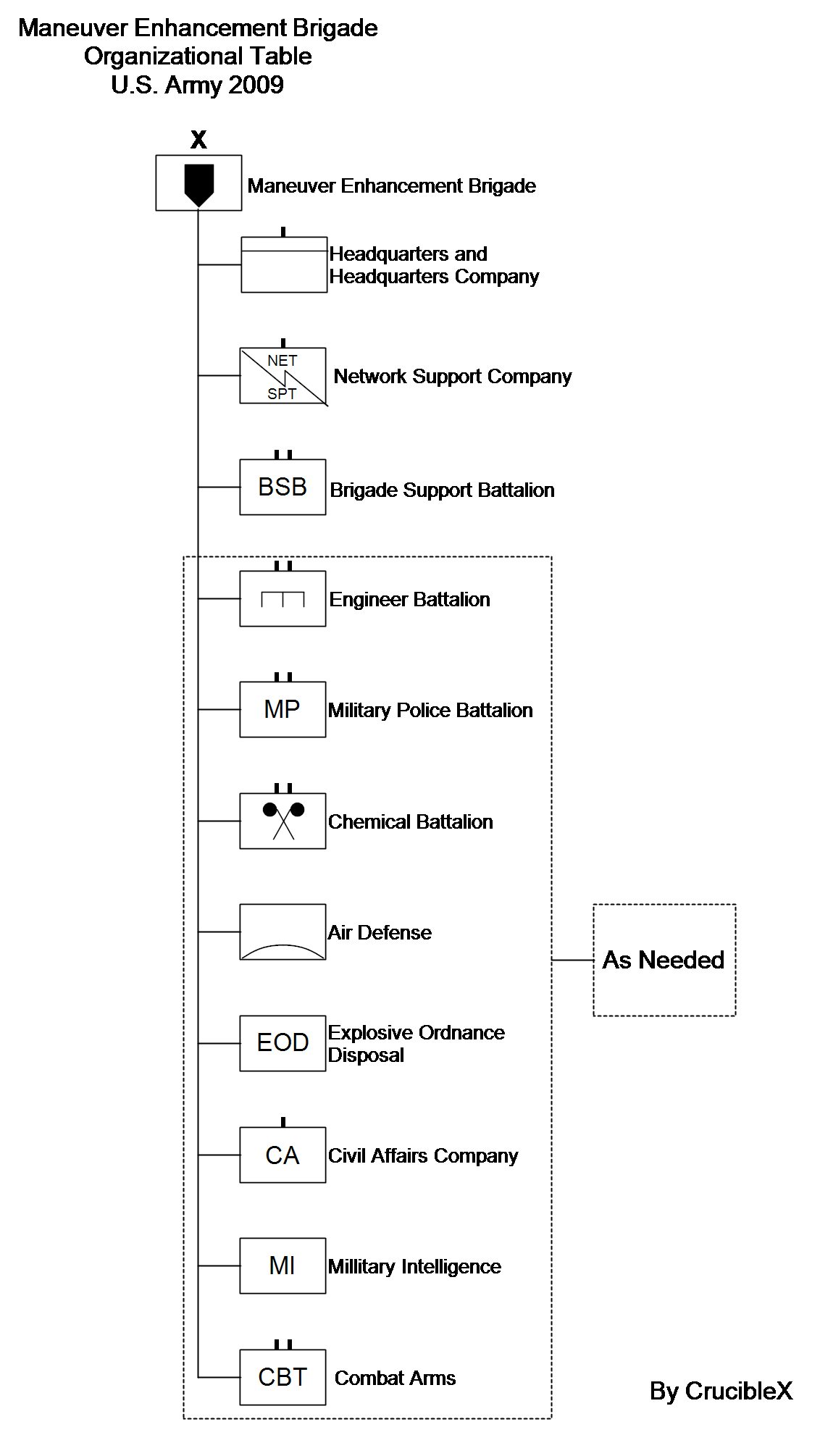
Maneuver Enhancement Brigade Structure

==== Security Force Assistance Brigades ====
Security force assistance brigades (SFABs) are brigades whose mission is to train, advise, and assist (TAA) the armed forces of other states. The SFAB are neither bound by conventional decisive operations nor counter-insurgency operations. Operationally, a 500-soldier SFAB would free-up a 4500-soldier BCT from a TAA mission. On 23 June 2016 General Mark Milley revealed plans for train/advise/assist Brigades, consisting of seasoned officers and NCOs with a full chain of command, but no junior Soldiers. In the event of a national emergency the end-strengths of the SFABs could be augmented with new soldiers from basic training and advanced individual training.

An SFAB was projected to consist of 500 senior officers and NCOs, which, the Army says, could act as a cadre to reform a full BCT in a matter of months. In May 2017, the initial SFAB staffing of 529 soldiers was underway, including 360 officers. The officers will have had previous command experience. Commanders and leaders will have previously led BCTs at the same echelon. The remaining personnel, all senior NCOs, are to be recruited from across the Army. Promotable E-4s who volunteer for the SFAB are automatically promoted to Sergeant upon completion of the Military Advisor Training Academy. A team of twelve soldiers would include a medic, personnel for intelligence support, and air support, as cited by Keller.

These SFABs would be trained in languages, how to work with interpreters, and equipped with the latest equipment such as Integrated Tactical Network (ITN) using T2C2 systems including secure, but unclassified, communications and weapons to support coalition partners, as well as unmanned aircraft systems (UASs). The first five SFABs would align with the Combatant Commands (SOUTHCOM, AFRICOM, CENTCOM, EUCOM, and USINDOPACOM, respectively); an SFAB could provide up to 58 teams (possibly with additional Soldiers for force protection).

Funding for the first two SFABs was secured in June 2017. By October 2017, the first of six planned SFABs (the 1st Security Force Assistance Brigade) was established at Fort Benning. On 16 October 2017, BG Brian Mennes of Force Management in the Army's G3/5/7 announced accelerated deployment of the first two SFABs, possibly by Spring 2018 to Afghanistan and Iraq, if required. This was approved in early July 2017, by the 27th Secretary of Defense and the 39th Chief of Staff of the Army. On 8 February 2018, 1st SFAB held an activation ceremony at Fort Benning, revealing its colors and heraldry for the first time, and then cased its colors for the deployment to Afghanistan. 1st Security Force Assistance Brigade deployed to Afghanistan in spring 2018.

On 8 December 2017, the Army announced the activation of the 2nd Security Force Assistance Brigade, for January 2018, the second of six planned SFABs. The SFAB are to consist of about 800 senior and noncommissioned officers who have served at the same echelon, with proven expertise in advise-and-assist operations with foreign security forces. Fort Bragg was chosen as the station for the second SFAB in anticipation of the time projected to train a Security Force Assistance Brigade. On 17 January 2018 39th Chief of Staff Mark Milley announced the activation of the third SFAB. 2nd SFAB undergoes three months of training beginning October 2018, to be followed by a Joint Readiness Training Center Rotation beginning January 2019, and deployment in spring 2019. The 3rd, 4th, and 5th SFABs are to be stationed at Fort Cavazos, Fort Carson, and Joint Base Lewis-McChord, respectively; the headquarters of the 54th Security Force Assistance Brigade, made up from the Army National Guard, will be in Indiana, one of six states to contribute an element of 54th SFAB. It is likely that these brigades will be seeing service within United States Central Command.

The Security Force Assistance Command (SFAC), a one-star division-level command and all six SFABs will be activated by 2020. The Security Force Assistance Directorate, a one-star Directorate for the SFABs, is part of FORSCOM in Fort Bragg. SFAD will be responsible for the Military Advisor Training Academy as well. The 1st SFAB commander was promoted to Brigadier General in Gardez, Afghanistan on 18 August 2018. The 2nd SFAB commander was promoted to Brigadier General 7 September 2018. SFAC and 2nd SFAB were activated in a joint ceremony at Fort Braggon 3 December 2018. 2nd SFAB deployed to Afghanistan in February 2019. 3rd SFAB activated at Fort Hood on 16 July 2019; 3rd SFAB will relieve 2nd SFAB in Afghanistan for the Winter 2019 rotation.

Security Assistance is part of The Army Strategy 2018's Line of Effort 4: "Strengthen Alliances and Partnerships". The Security Assistance Command is based at Redstone Arsenal (but the SFAC is based at Fort Bragg).

==== Army Field Support Brigades ====
Army Field Support Brigades (AFSBs) have been utilized to field materiel in multiple Combatant Command's Areas of Responsibility (AORs). Initially 405th AFSB prepositioned stocks for a partial brigade; eventually, the 405th was to field materiel for an ABCT, a Division headquarters, a Fires Brigade, and a Sustainment Brigade in their AOR, which required multinational agreements. Similarly, 401st AFSB configured materiel for an ABCT in their AOR as well. The objective has been combat configuration: maintain their vehicles to support a 96-hour readiness window for a deployed ABCT on demand. In addition, 403rd Army Field Support Brigade maintains prepositioned stocks for their AOR.

== Training and readiness ==
Under Schoomaker, combat training centers (CTCs) emphasized the contemporary operating environment (such as an urban, ethnically-sensitive city in Iraq) and stress units according to the unit mission and the commanders' assessments, collaborating often to support holistic collective training programs, rather than by exception as was formerly the case.

Schoomaker's plan was to resource units based on the mission they are expected to accomplish (major combat versus SASO, or stability and support operations), regardless of component (active or reserve). Instead of using snapshot readiness reports, the Army now rates units based on the mission they are expected to perform given their position across the three force pools ('reset', 'train/ready', and 'available'). The Army now deploys units upon each commanders' signature on the certificate of their unit's assessment (viz., Ready). As of June 2016, only one-third of the Army's brigades were ready to deploy. By 2019, two-thirds of the Active Army's brigades and half of the BCTs of the Total Army (both Active and Reserve components) are now at the highest level of readiness. The FY2021 budget request allows two-thirds of the Total Army (1,012,200 Soldiers by 2022) to reach the highest level of readiness by FY2022 —Maj. Gen. Paul Chamberlain.

Soldiers need to be ready (Note: Readiness means: Be informed; Make A Plan; Build a Kit; and Get Involved) 100 percent of the time

— Robert B. Abrams, FORSCOM commander, June 2, 2016

39th Chief of Staff Mark Milley's readiness objective is that all operational units be at 90 percent of the authorized strength in 2018, at 100 percent by 2021, and at 105 percent by 2023. The observer coach/trainers at the combat training centers, recruiters, and drill sergeants are to be filled to 100 percent strength by the end of 2018. In November 2018, written deployability standards (Army Directive 2018–22) were set by the Secretary and the Chief of Staff of the Army; failure to meet the standard means a soldier has six months to remedy this, or face separation from the Army. The directive does not apply to about 60,000 of the 1,016,000 Soldiers of the Army; 70–80 percent of the 60,000 are non-deployable for medical reasons. Non-deployables have declined from 121,000 in 2017. The Army combat fitness test (ACFT) will test all soldiers; at the minimum, the 3-Repetition Maximum Deadlift, the Sprint-Drag-Carry and an aerobic event will be required of all soldiers, including those with profiles (meaning there is an annotation in their record See: PULHES Factor); the assessment of the alternative aerobic test will be completed by 19 October 2019.

=== Soldier and Family Readiness Groups ===
By 2022 surveys of military servicemen, veterans, and spouses and family were indicating that financial and other difficulties were raising questions about the viability of an all-volunteer force.

Soldiers and Army spouses belong to Soldier and Family Readiness Groups (SFRGs), renamed from (FRGs) which mirror the command structure of an Army unit—the spouse of the 40th Chief of Staff of the United States Army has served on the FRG at every echelon of the Army. The name change to SFRG is to be more inclusive of single soldiers, single parents, and also those with nontraditional families. An S/FRG seeks to meet the needs of soldiers and their families, for example during a deployment, or to address privatized housing deficiencies, or to aid spouses find jobs. As a soldier transfers in and out of an installation, the soldier's entire family will typically undergo a permanent change of station (PCS) to the next post. PCS to Europe and Japan is now uniformly for 36 months, regardless of family status (formerly 36 months for families). Transfers typically follow the cycle of the school year to minimize disruption in an Army family. By policy, DoD families stationed in Europe and Japan who have school-aged children are served by American school systems— the Department of Defense Dependents Schools. Noncombatant evacuation operations are a contingency which an FRG could publicize and plan for, should the need arise. In 2021, a new Exceptional Family Member Program (EFMP) is being tested by 300 families who are undergoing a permanent change of station (PCS).

When a family emergency occurs, the informal support of that unit's S/FRG is available to the soldier. (But the Army Emergency Relief fund is available to any soldier with a phone call to their local garrison. Seventy-five Fisher Houses maintain home-away-from-home suites for families undergoing medical treatment of a loved one. The Army, Navy, and Air Force Medical Treatment Facilities (MTFs) are scheduled to complete their transfer to the Defense Health Agency (DHA) no later than 21 October 2021. This has been a ten-year process. The directors of each home installation's Medical treatment facility (MTF) continue to report to the commanders of their respective installations. This change transfers all civilian employees of each Medical treatment facility (MTF) to the Defense Health Agency (DHA).) The name change links Soldier Readiness with Family Readiness. Commanders will retain full responsibility for Soldier sponsorship after a move, especially for first term Soldiers in that move.

In response to Army tenant problems with privatized base housing, IMCOM was subordinated to Army Materiel Command (AMC) on 8 March 2019. By 2020, AMC's commander and the Residential community initiative (RCI) groups had formulated a 50-year plan. The Army's RCI groups, "seven private housing companies, which have 50-year lease agreements" on 98% of Army housing at 44 installations, will work with the Army for long-term housing improvements, and remediation.

In 2020 Secretary McCarthy determined that the Sexual Harassment/Assault Response & Prevention (SHARP) program has failed to meet its mandate, particularly for young unmarried Soldiers at Fort Hood and Camp Casey, South Korea. Missing soldiers were previously classified as Absent without leave until enough time has elapsed to be denoted deserters, rather than victims of a crime; the Army has established a new classification for missing Soldiers, to merit police investigation.

In response to the report of the Fort Hood Independent Review Committee, the Army has established the People first task force (PFTF), an Army-wide task force that is headed by 3 chairs: 1) Lt. Gen. Gary M. Brito, 2) Diane M. Randon, and 3) Sgt. Maj. Julie A.M. Guerra, who are: 1) the deputy chief of staff G-1, 2) the assistant deputy chief of staff G-2, and 3) the assistant deputy chief of staff G-2 Sgt. Maj. respectively. Cohesion assessment teams (CATs), part of the People first task force, work with brigade commanders on their brigade's command climate. The Cohesion assessment team interviews members of that brigade or battalion, to identify any problems. The CAT then works with the unit commanders to address the root causes of those problems. On 13 May 2022 Fort Hood's People First Center opened its doors; the center is to offer immersive experiences for participants over several days, centered on "family advocacy, sexual harassment and assault prevention, equal opportunity, resiliency, substance abuse, suicide [prevention] (The Senate Armed Services Committee is requesting that the military track suicides by MOS.), and spiritual readiness ... all housed at the center with training focused on immersion", collocated with subject matter experts.

=== USAR mobilization ===
Plans are being formulated for mobilization of the Army Reserve (42,000 to 45,000 soldiers) very quickly. For example, 'Ready Force X' (RFX) teams have fielded Deployment Assistance Team Command and Control Cells to expedite the associated equipment to the various ports and vessels which is required for the specific Reserve personnel who have been notified that they are deploying. FORSCOM's mobilization and force generation installations (MFGIs) have fluctuated from two primary installations (2018) to an envisioned eleven primary and fourteen contingency MFGIs, in preparation for future actions against near-peers.

- Capt. Joselyn Sydnor 653rd Regional Support Group was mobilized as the Fort Bliss Mobilization Brigade; the mobilization of 30th ABCT was used to test out the mobilization process of the reserve component of the Army.

=== National Guard training ===
The 29th chief of the National Guard Bureau, as director of the Army National Guard, plans to align existing ARNG divisions with subordinate training formations. This plan increases the number of divisions in the Total Army from 10 to 18, and increases the readiness of the National Guard divisions, by aligning their training plans with large-scale combat operations. Additional advantages of the August 2020 plan are increased opportunity for talent management, from the Company to the Division level, and opportunity for leader development unfettered by geographical restriction.

=== "Associated units" training program ===
The Army announced a pilot program, 'associated units', in which a National Guard or Reserve unit would now train with a specific active Army formation. These units would wear the patch of the specific Army division before their deployment to a theater; 36th Infantry Division headquarters deployed to Afghanistan in May 2016 for a train, advise, assist mission.

The Army Reserve, whose headquarters are co-located with FORSCOM, and the National Guard, are testing the associated units program in a three-year pilot program with the active Army. The program will use the First Army training roles at the Army Combat Training Centers at Fort Irwin, Fort Polk, and regional and overseas training facilities.

The pilot program complements FORSCOM's total force partnerships with the National Guard, begun in 2014. Summer 2016 will see the first of these units.

- Associated units
  - 3rd Infantry BCT, 10th Mountain Division, stationed at Fort Polk, Louisiana, associated with the 36th Infantry Division, Texas Army National Guard
  - 48th Infantry BCT, Georgia ARNG, associated with the 3rd Infantry Division, Stationed at Fort Stewart, Georgia
  - 86th Infantry BCT, Vermont ARNG, associated with the 10th Mountain Division, stationed at Fort Drum, New York
  - 81st Armored BCT, Washington ARNG, associated with the 7th Infantry Division, stationed at Joint Base Lewis-McChord, Washington
  - Task Force 1-28th Infantry Battalion., 3rd Infantry Division, stationed at Fort Benning, Georgia, associated with the 48th Infantry BCT, Georgia Army National Guard
  - 100th Battalion, 442nd Infantry Regiment, USAR, associated with the 3rd Infantry BCT, 25th Infantry Division, stationed at Schofield Barracks, Hawaii
  - 1st Battalion (Airborne), 143rd Infantry Regiment Texas ARNG, associated with the 173rd Airborne BCT, stationed in Vicenza, Italy
  - 1st Battalion, 151st Infantry Regiment, Indiana ARNG, associated with the 2nd Infantry BCT, 25th Infantry Division, stationed at Schofield Barracks
  - 5th Engineer Battalion, stationed at Fort Leonard Wood, Missouri, associated with the 35th Engineer Brigade, Missouri ARNG
  - 840th Engineer Company, Texas ARNG, associated with the 36th Engineer Brigade, stationed at Fort Cavazos, Texas
  - 824th Quartermaster Company, USAR, associated with the 82nd Airborne Division's Sustainment Brigade, stationed at Fort Bragg, North Carolina
  - 249th Transportation Company, Texas ARNG, associated with the 1st Cavalry Division's Sustainment Brigade., stationed in Fort Cavazos
  - 1245th Transportation Company, Oklahoma ARNG, associated with the 1st Cavalry Division's Sustainment Brigade., stationed in Fort Cavazos
  - 1176th Transportation Company, Tennessee ARNG, associated with the 101st Airborne Division's Sustainment Brigade, stationed at Fort Campbell, Kentucky
  - 2123rd Transportation Company, Kentucky ARNG, associated with the 101st Airborne Division's Sustainment Brigade, stationed at Fort Campbell

=== Rifleman training ===
Soldiers train for weapons handling, and marksmanship first individually, on static firing ranges, and then on simulators such as an Engagement Skills Trainer (EST). More advanced training on squad level simulators (Squad Advanced Marksmanship-Trainer (SAMT)) place a squad in virtual engagements against avatars of various types, using M4 carbine, M249 light machine gun and M9 Beretta pistol simulated weapon systems. Home stations are to receive Synthetic training environments (STEs) for mission training, as an alternative to rotations to the National Combat Training Centers, which operate Brigade-level training against an Opposing force (OPFOR) with near-peer equipment.

Some installations have urban training facilities for infantrymen, in preparation for brigade-level training.

A 2019 marksmanship manual TC 3-20.40, Training and Qualification-Individual Weapons (the "Dot-40") now mandates the use of the simulators, as if the soldier were in combat. The Dot-40 is to be used by the entire Army, from the Cadets at West Point to the Active Army, the Army Reserve, and Army National Guard; the Dot-40 tests how rapidly soldiers can load and reload while standing, kneeling, lying prone, and firing from behind a barrier. The marksmanship tests of a soldier's critical thinking, selecting targets to shoot at, in which order, and the accuracy of each shot are recorded by the simulators.

=== Stryker training ===
Up to a platoon-sized unit of a Stryker brigade combat team, and dismounted infantry, can train on Stryker simulators (Stryker Virtual Collective Trainer – SVCT), which are in the process of being installed at eight home stations. The fourth was being completed as of 2019. Forty-five infantrymen (four Stryker shells) or thirty-six scouts (six Stryker shells) can rehearse their battle rhythm on a virtual battlefield, record their lessons learned, give their after-action reports, and repeat, as a team. The Stryker gunner's seat comes directly from a Stryker vehicle and has a Common Remotely Operated Weapon Station (CROWS) and joystick to control a virtual .50 caliber (12.7 mm) heavy machine gun or a virtual 30 mm autocannon and other CROWS configurations are possible.

=== Digital air ground integration ranges (DAGIRs) ===
Live-fire digital air ground integration ranges (DAGIRs) were first conceptualized in the 1990s, and established in 2012, with follow-on in 2019. The ranges initially included 23 miles of tank trails, targets, battlefield effects simulators, and digital wiring for aerial scorekeeping. These ranges are designed for coordinating air and ground exercises before full-on sessions at the National Training Centers.

=== Training against OPFORs ===
Opposing-Forces Surrogate Vehicles (OSVs) undergoing maintenance at Anniston Army Depot

To serve a role as an Opposing force (OPFOR) could be a mission for an Army unit, as temporary duty (TDY), during which they might wear old battle dress uniforms, perhaps inside-out. TRADOC's Mission Command Training Program, as well as Cyber Command designs tactics for these OPFORs. When a brigade trains at Fort Irwin, Fort Polk, Joint Pacific Multinational Readiness Center, or Joint Multinational Training Center (in Hohenfels, Germany) the Army tasks 11th Armored Cavalry Regiment, 1st Battalion, 509th Infantry Regiment (Abn), 196th Infantry Brigade, and 1st Battalion, 4th Infantry Regiment, respectively, with the OPFOR role, and provides the OPFOR with modern equipment (such as the FGM-148 Javelin anti-tank missile) to test that brigade's readiness for deployment. Multiple integrated laser engagement systems serve as proxies for actual fired weapons, and soldiers are lost to the commander from "kills" by laser hits.

=== Training against cyber ===
Deceptive data intended to divide deployed forces are making their way into the news feeds, and are falsely implicating actual soldiers who are deployed at the time of the false social media reports, which are mixing fact and fiction.

The Army now has its tenth direct-commissioned cyber officer: a Sergeant First Class with a computer engineering degree, and a masters in system engineering was commissioned a major in the National Guard, 91st Cyber Brigade, on 30 July 2020.

=== Soldier integration facility ===
PEO Soldier has established a Soldier integration facility (SIF) at Fort Belvoir which allows prototyping and evaluation of combat capabilities for the Army Soldier. CCDC Soldier center in Natick Massachusetts, Night Vision Lab at Fort Belvoir Virginia, and Maneuver Battle Lab at Fort Benning, Georgia have prototyped ideas at the SIF.

=== Applications for Synthetic Training Environment (STE) ===
The Squad Advanced Marksmanship Training (SAMT) system, developed by the STE Cross-functional team from Futures Command, has an application for 1st SFAB. Bluetooth enabled replicas of M4 rifles and M9 and Glock 19 pistols, with compressed air recoil approximate the form, fit and function of the weapons that the Soldiers are using in close combat. For 1st SFAB, scenarios included virtual reality attacks which felt like engagements in a room. The scenarios can involve the entire SFAB Advisor team, and engagements can be repeated over and over again. Advanced marksmanship skills such as firing with the non-dominant hand, and firing on the move can be practiced.

Nine Army sites are now equipped with the SAMT. Over twenty systems are planned for locations in the United States. The Close combat tactical trainers are in use, for example, to train 3rd Infantry Division headquarters for a gunnery training event (convoy protection role), and 2nd BCT/ 82nd Airborne close combat training.

The concept has been extended to the Live, Virtual, Constructive Integrating Architecture (LVC-IA), to integrate the National Guard, and the Reserves, with Active Army.

- "A simulation places leadership teams in a situation akin to a Combat Training Center rotation, an intellectually and emotionally challenging environment that forgives the mistakes of the participants "—Dr. Charles K. Pickar
- "It is important for Soldiers to have an open and clear mind during the simulation so that they learn something from the experience." —Tim Glaspie
- "Repetition increases a team's situational understanding of the tactics they'll use" —Maj. Anthony Clas

Other training environments include MANPADS for SHORAD in the 14P MOS at Fort Sill.

I believe that a training environment .. should be a maneuver trainer, and it should be a gunnery trainer

— Retired Gen. Peter W. Chiarelli, 32nd vice chief of staff of the Army

== Deployment scheme ==
The force generation system, posited in 2006 by General Schoomaker, projected that the U.S. Army would be deployed continuously. The Army would serve as an expeditionary force to fight a protracted campaign against terrorism and stand ready for other potential contingencies across the full-spectrum of operations (from humanitarian and stability operations to major combat operations against a conventional foe).

Under ideal circumstances, Army units would have a minimum "dwell time," a minimum duration of which it would remain at home station before deployment. Active-duty units would be prepared to deploy once every three years. Army Reserve units would be prepared to deploy once every five years. National Guard units would be prepared to deploy once every six years. A total of 71 combat brigades would form the Army's rotation basis, 42 from the active component with the balance from the reserves.

Thus, around 15 active-duty combat brigades would be available for deployment each year under the 2006 force-generation plan. An additional 4 or 5 brigades would be available for deployment from the reserve component. The plan was designed to provide more stability to soldiers and their families. Within the system, a surge capability would exist so that about an additional 18 brigades could be deployed in addition to the 19 or 20 scheduled brigades.

From General Dan McNeil, former Army Forces Command (FORSCOM) Commander: Within the Army Forces Generation (ARFORGEN) model, brigade combat teams (BCTs) would move through a series of three force pools; they would enter the model at its inception, the "reset force pool", upon completion of a deployment cycle. There they would re-equip and reman while executing all individual predeployment training requirements, attaining readiness as quickly as possible. Reset or "R" day, recommended by FORSCOM and approved by Headquarters, Department of the Army, would be marked by BCT changes of command, preceded or followed closely by other key leadership transitions. While in the reset pool, formations would be remanned, reaching 100% of mission required strength by the end of the phase, while also reorganizing and fielding new equipment, if appropriate. In addition, it is there that units would be confirmed against future missions, either as deployment expeditionary forces (DEFs-BCTs trained for known operational requirements), ready expeditionary forces (REFs-BCTs that form the pool of available forces for short-notice missions) or contingency expeditionary forces (CEFs-BCTs earmarked for contingency operations).

Based on their commanders' assessments, units would move to the ready force pool, from which they could deploy should they be needed, and in which the unit training focus would be at the higher collective levels. Units would enter the available force pool when there is approximately one year left in the cycle, after validating their collective mission-essential task list proficiency (either core or theater-specific tasks) via battle-staff and dirt-mission rehearsal exercises. The available phase would be the only phase with a specified time limit: one year. Not unlike the division-ready brigades of past decades, these formations would deploy to fulfill specific requirements or stand ready to fulfill short-notice deployments within 30 days.

The goal was to generate forces 12–18 months in advance of combatant commanders' requirements and to begin preparing every unit for its future mission as early as possible in order to increase its overall proficiency.

Personnel management would also be reorganized as part of the Army transformation. Previously, personnel was managed on an individual basis in which soldiers were rotated without regard for the effect on unit cohesion. This system required unpopular measures such as "stop loss" and "stop move" in order to maintain force levels. In contrast, the new personnel system would operate on a unit basis to the maximum extent possible, with the goal of allowing teams to remain together longer and enabling families to establish ties within their communities.

Abrams 2016 noted that mid-level Army soldiers found they faced an unexpected uptempo in their requirements, while entry-level soldiers in fact welcomed the increased challenge.

=== Readiness model ===
ARFORGEN, "a structured progression of increased unit readiness over time, resulting in recurring periods of availability of trained, ready, and cohesive units prepared for operational deployment in support of geographic Combatant Commander requirements" was utilized in the 2010s. ARFORGEN was replaced by the Sustainable Readiness Model (SRM) in 2017. In 2016 the 39th Chief of Staff of the Army identified the objective of a sustainable readiness process as over 66 percent of the Active Army in combat ready state at any time; in 2019 the readiness objective of the National Guard and Army Reserve units was set to be 33 percent; Total Army readiness for deployment was 40 percent in 2019.

Regionally Aligned Readiness and Modernization Model (ReARMM) is a unit lifecycle model which goes into effect in October 2021. ReARMM was introduced in October 2020. It is a force generation model which uses the total Army, the Reserve components as well as Active component when planning. >Dynamic force employment (DFE) will be used more often. The Operational tempo will decrease, which gives Commanders will more times, 'training windows' during which their units can train, first at the small-unit level, and then at larger-step modernization of their formations. The units can then train at echelon for Large scale combat operations (LSCO) at a more measured pace.

In 2018 39th Chief of Staff Mark Milley's readiness objective is that all operational units be at 90 percent of the authorized strength in 2018, at 100 percent by 2021, and at 105 percent by 2023. The observer coach/trainers at the combat training centers, recruiters, and drill sergeants are to be filled to 100 percent strength by the end of 2018.

The requested strength of the Active Army in FY2020 is increasing by 4,000 additional troops from the current 476,000 soldiers; this request covers the near-term needs for cyber, air & missile defense, and fires (Army modernization).

Organic industrial base (OIB)

The Army's Organic industrial base (OIB) Modernization Implementation Plan got a refresh in 2022, with a review of the "23 depots, arsenals and ammunition plants that manufacture, reset and maintain Army equipment", in light of the 2022 Russian invasion of Ukraine.

The Acting CG of FORSCOM, Lt. Gen. Laura Richardson, has noted that the Sustainable Readiness Model uses the Army standard for maintenance readiness, denoted TM 10/20, which makes commanders responsible for maintaining their equipment to the TM 10/20 standard, meaning that "all routine maintenance is executed and all deficiencies are repaired". But Richardson has also spoken out about aviation-related supplier deficiencies hurting readiness both at the combatant commands and at the home stations.

=== Prepositioned stocks ===
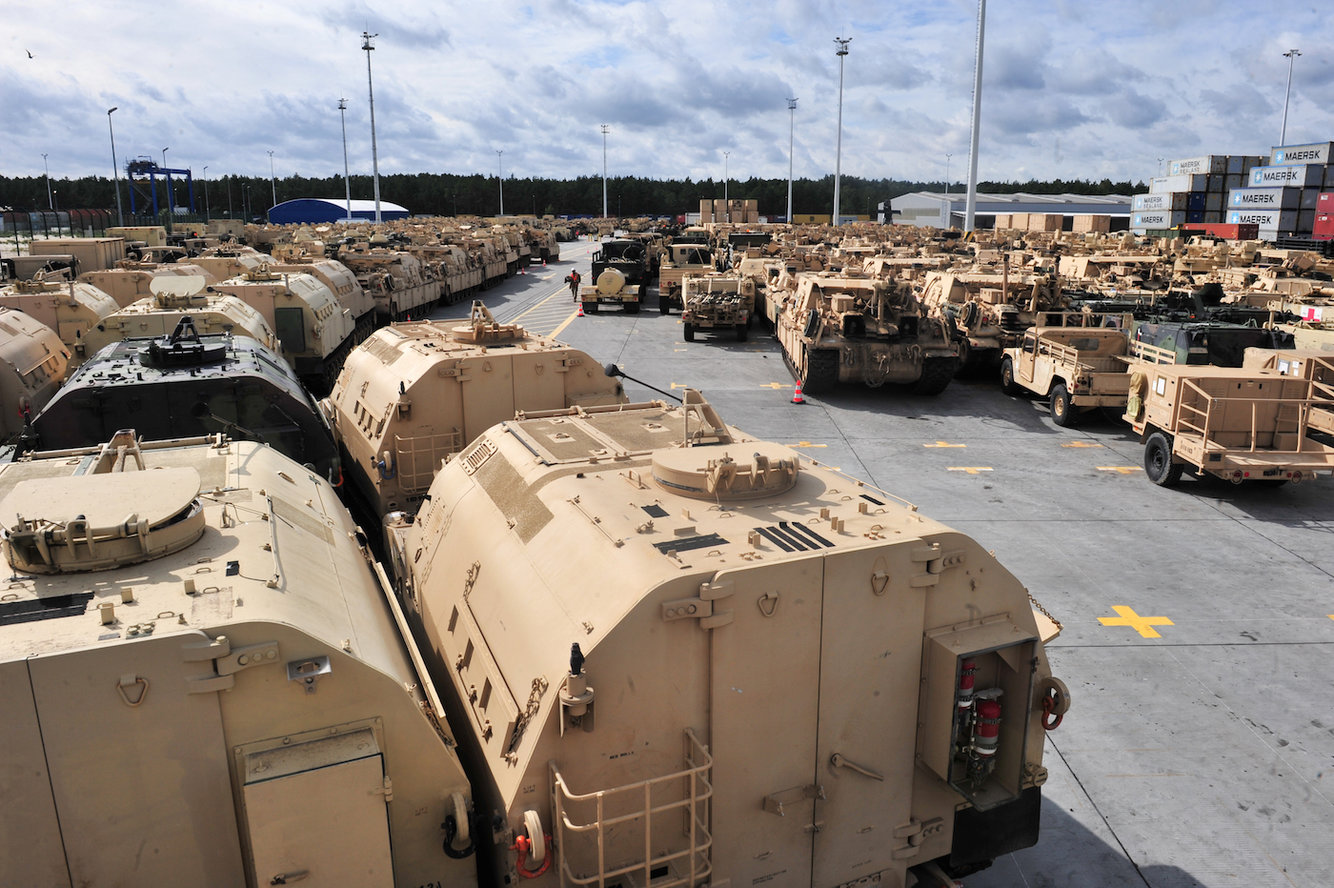
Materiel for 2nd Armored Brigade Combat Team, 1st Infantry Division, arriving in Gdańsk, Poland

United States Army Materiel Command (AMC), which uses Army Field Support Brigades (AFSB) to provision the Combatant Commands, has established Army prepositioned stocks (APS) for supplying entire Brigade Combat Teams (BCTs), at several areas of responsibility (AORs):

- APS-1 is Continental US (CONUS)
- APS-2 in EUCOM, using several sites, will accelerate the flow of up-to-date materiel there, to forward-operating sites.
- APS-3 in Pacific Ocean, uses ocean-going vessels.
  1. The materiel positioning is allocated under the Calibrated force posture:
  2. Some materiel will be drawn by units under the Dynamic force employment (DFE) initiative
  3. Some troop units will be forward deployed
  4. Some troop units will rotate in
  5. Some prepositioned stock is under discussion with specific nations with agreements to be announced (currently classified as of October 2020)
  6. An SFAB is allocated to the Pacific AoR
- APS-4 in NE Asia
- APS-5 in CENTCOM's Camp Arifjan, Kuwait, and SW Asia

By 2020 AMC had seven Army prepositioned stocks.

Medical readiness is being tested by the U.S. Army Medical Materiel Agency, a Life Cycle Management Command (LCMC). The LCMCs are stocking three additional locations in the US (APS-1), as well as APS-2 (EUCOM), and Korea, as of 12 February 2019. For example, during Operation Spartan Shield, the LCMC's relevant AFSB effected the hand-off of prepositioned stocks to 155th Armored Brigade Combat Team (ABCT) within 96 hours. In the same Operation, 155th ABCT was issued an entire equipment set for an ABCT, drawn from APS-5 stocks, over 13,000 pieces.

=== Air Defense Artillery deployments ===
On 27 March 2018 the 678th Air Defense Artillery Brigade (South Carolina National Guard) deployed to EUCOM, Ansbach Germany for a nine-month rotation, for the first time since the Cold War. 10th AAMDC is the executive agent for EUCOM.

In September 2018, the Wall Street Journal reported that four Patriot systems— Two from Kuwait, and one apiece from Jordan and Bahrain are redeploying back to the U.S. for refurbishment and upgrades, and will not be replaced. In June 2021, 8 Patriot batteries and a THAAD battery are being withdrawn from the CENTCOM area to focus on Russia and China. By March 2022 NATO Patriot batteries had begun repositioning to Slovakia, and Poland from the Netherlands, and Germany respectively.

=== Forward-deployed materiel ===
As the U.S. Army's only forward-deployed Airborne brigade, 173rd Airborne Brigade Combat Team, stationed in EUCOM, was supplied with new communications materiel — Integrated Tactical Networks (ITN) in 2018. New ground combat vehicles, the infantry carrier vehicle – Dragoon (M1126 infantry carrier vehicle) are being supplied to 2nd Cavalry Regiment. ICVDs are Strykers with an unmanned turret and 30 mm autocannon (CROWS), and an integrated commander's station, upgraded suspension and larger tires. The Army brigades of EUCOM have been in position for testing materiel, as its elements engaged in a 2018 road march through Europe, training with 19 ally and partner nations in Poland in 2018.

Bulgaria has expressed interest in Strykers.

=== Dynamic force employment ===
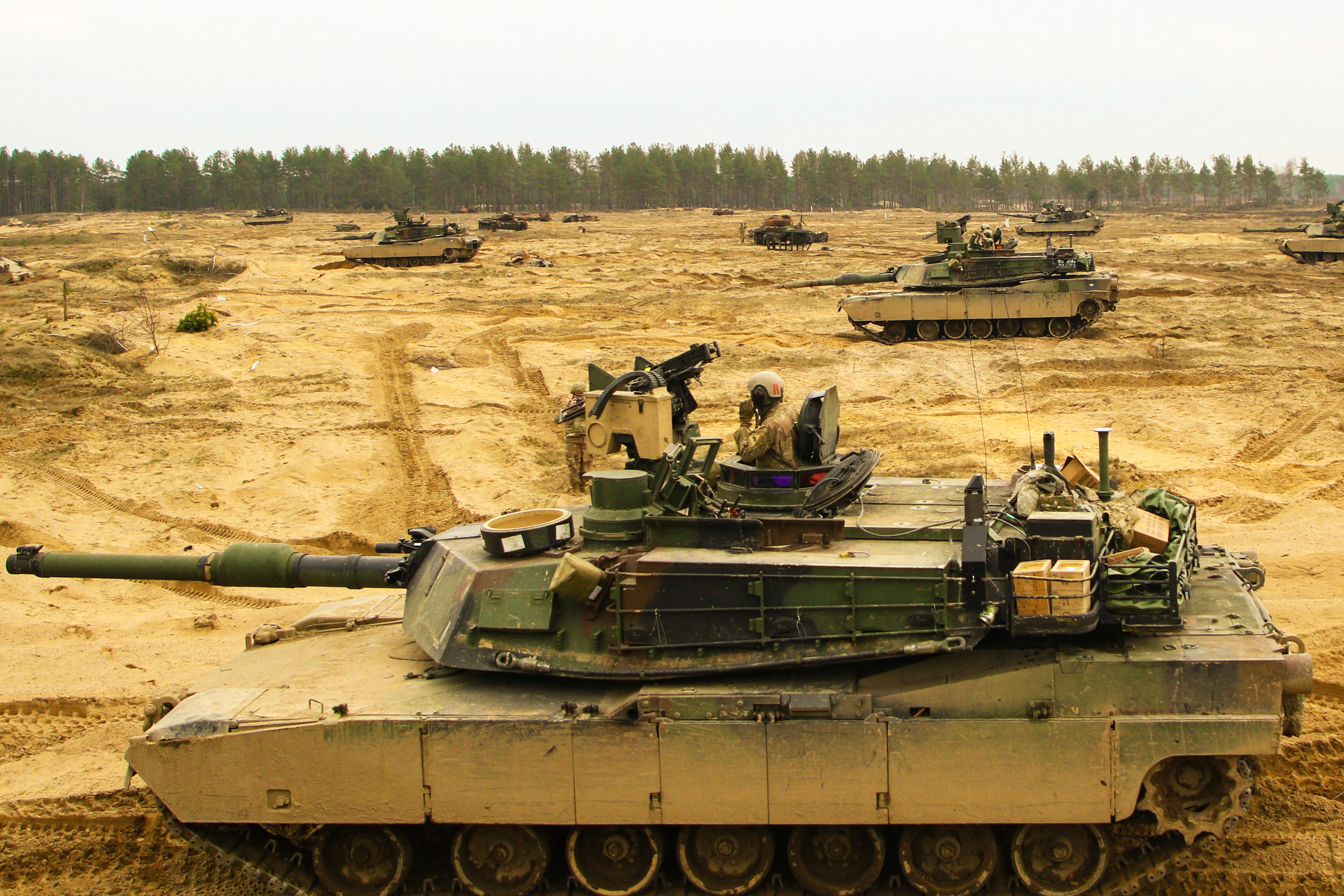
2nd Armored Brigade Combat Team (ABCT), 1st Armored Division (2/1AD) element in a snap deployment from Fort Bliss to Drawsko Pomorskie training area, Poland, 29 March 2019

This initiative, designed by then-DoD-Secretary James Mattis, exercises the ability of selected BCTs to rapidly surge combat-ready forces into a theater, such as EUCOM, on short notice. In several such cases, at the direction of the Secretary of Defense in March 2019, troops were rapidly alerted, recalled and deployed to a forward position, under (simulated) emergency conditions, to prove a capability (such as an ABCT, and a THAAD battery) against near-peers. The ABCT element next participated in a joint live-fire exercise with Polish troops of the 12th Mechanized Brigade, 12th Mechanised Division (Poland) in Drawsko Pomorskie Training Area, Poland. (A Mission Command element of TRADOC served in the role of echelon-above-brigade for the maneuver and interoperability of the joint multi-national armored brigades.) In September 2018, the 278th Armored Cavalry Regiment had already assumed a forward deployment in Poland. Poland and the US are planning for regular rotations going forward. A Combat Aviation Brigade element, an Armored Combat Brigade element, and a Division Headquarters element will rotate in.

Similar initiatives are planned for other alliances.

In August 2020 Poland agreed to pay almost all costs associated with US presence in the country; a forward command post for V Corps in Poland has been codified in an Enhanced Defense Cooperation Agreement between the US and Poland. Poland is buying 250 M1A2 Abrams tanks as of 14 July 2021. Poland ordered an additional 116 used M1A1 Abrams tanks, with faster delivery dates on 15 July 2022. The first 14 of an expected 42 M1A1 Abrams tanks arrived in Poland on 28 June 2023; the 42 will comprise one tank battalion; the 42 tanks are to be the 2023 tranche of 116 M1A1 tanks for Poland.

In addition to tanks, Poland is buying attack helicopters, Patriot missiles, HIMARS, and F-35s. Poland is buying 96 AH-64E Apaches (to equip six squadrons). Naval Strike Missiles, and LTAMDS missile defense radars. Poland is seeking more HIMARS rockets and launchers, with an eye toward local rocket production in the future. In July 2022, six IBCS Engagement Operations Centers attained basic operational capability in Poland, and are a component for JADC2.

FORSCOM exercised its Emergency deployment readiness exercises (EDREs) in 2019 by sending 2nd Brigade Combat Team, 10th Mountain Division to the Joint Readiness Training Center in Fort Polk, Louisiana, by sealift, simultaneously exercising the logistics planners at Fort Drum, the seaports in Philadelphia, Pennsylvania, and Port Arthur, Texas, as well as 2nd BCT. Through the EDRE program, 20 of the ports have been exercised to ready them for sealift deployments. A division-sized move of 20,000 pieces of equipment from the US to Europe began a month-long process in January 2020. In 2020 the pre-COVID-19 plan was "wide-spanning maneuvers will focus on the Baltic States, Poland, and Georgia" (at the time) which would have involved 36,000 troops from 11 countries ranging from the Baltic to the Black Seas, a number still in flux. A number of the Defender-2020 objectives were met in 2020, despite a 60-day travel ban by DoD.

By 2020 the 27th Secretary of Defense signaled that ABMS, its Internet of Military Things, and JADC2 were important parts for Dynamic force employment (DFE) in the Joint All-domain Operations Concept. The Combatant commanders at Eucom, and at IndoPacom sought the AGM-183A (ARRW) hypersonic weapon on the bomber fleet for Dynamic force employment.

In light of the 2022 Russian invasion of Ukraine, thousands more troops have posted or rotated to Europe. As of February 2023 the US is planning a HIMARS training center in Poland. In order to get 31 Abrams tanks to Ukraine, the Army is weighing options with the fastest delivery times, none of which are sooner than year-end 2023. (Note: Poland, Australia, Egypt, Iraq, Kuwait, Saudi Arabia, Morocco, and Taiwan are M1 Abrams customers.)

== Force size and unit organization ==
Overall, the Army would end up with 71 brigade combat teams and 212 support brigades, in the pre-2013 design. The Regular Army would move from 33 brigade combat teams in 2003 to 43 brigade combat teams together with 75 modular support brigades, for a total of 118 Regular Army modular brigades. In addition the previously un-designated training brigades such as the Infantry Training Brigade at Fort Benning assumed the lineage & honors of formerly active Regular Army combat brigades. In 2017 there were 31 brigade combat teams in the Active Army. Within the Army National Guard, there were to be 28 brigade combat teams and 78 support brigades. Within the Army Reserve, the objective was 59 support brigades. Chief of Staff Mark Milley credits Creighton Abrams (Chief of Staff 1972-1974), for placing most of the support brigades in the Reserve and National Guard in order to ensure that the nation would use the total army rather than only the active army in an extended war involving the entire nation.

The Reserve component will be playing an increased role. In the Total Army, eight Army National Guard divisions are to be trained to increase their readiness for large-scale combat operations, making 58 BCTs in the Total Army in 2018, and six SFABs in 2020.

=== Army commands ===
- United States Army Forces Command headquartered at Fort Bragg, North Carolina
- United States Army Transformation and Training Command headquarters in Austin, Texas
- United States Army Materiel Command headquartered at Redstone Arsenal, Alabama

=== Army service component commands ===
- Geographic commands
  - United States Army Central / Third Army headquartered at Shaw Air Force Base, South Carolina
  - United States Army North / Fifth Army headquartered at Joint Base San Antonio, Texas
  - United States Army South / Sixth Army headquartered at Joint Base San Antonio, Texas
  - United States Army Europe and Africa / Seventh Army headquartered at Wiesbaden, Germany
  - United States Army Pacific headquartered at Fort Shafter, Hawaii
- Functional commands
  - United States Army Space and Missile Defense Command headquartered at Redstone Arsenal, Alabama
  - United States Army Special Operations Command headquartered at Fort Bragg, North Carolina
  - Military Surface Deployment and Distribution Command headquartered at Scott Air Force Base, Illinois
  - United States Army Cyber Command headquartered at Fort Gordon, Georgia

=== Army direct reporting units ===
- United States Army Medical Command (MEDCOM)
- United States Army Intelligence and Security Command (INSCOM) headquartered at Fort Belvoir, Virginia
- United States Army Joint Counter-Small Unmanned Aircraft Systems Office
- United States Army Corps of Engineers
- United States Military Academy
- United States Army Military District of Washington (MDW) headquartered at Fort McNair, District of Columbia
- United States Army Criminal Investigation Division (USACID) headquartered at Marine Corps Base Quantico, Virginia
- United States Army Test and Evaluation Command (ATEC)

=== Field armies ===
- First US Army, headquartered at Rock Island Arsenal, Illinois (A component of FORSCOM; responsible for training the reserve components when mobilized for overseas deployment)
- Eighth US Army, headquartered at Camp Humphreys, South Korea (component of United States Forces Korea)

=== Army corps ===
- I Corps headquartered at Joint Base Lewis-McChord, Washington
- III Armored Corps headquartered at Fort Hood, Texas
- V Corps headquartered at Fort Knox, Kentucky
- XVIII Airborne Corps headquartered at Fort Bragg, North Carolina

=== Divisions and brigades ===
Note: these formations were subject to change, announced in 2013 reform

In the post-2013 design, the Regular Army was planned to reduce to 32 BCTs after all the BCTs had been announced for inactivation. The 2018 budget was to further reduce 40,000 active-duty soldiers from 490,000 in 2015 to 450,000 by 2018 fiscal year-end. Thirty installations would have been affected; six of these installations would have accounted for over 12,000 of those to be let go. In early 2015, the plan was to cut entire BCTs; by July 2015, a new plan, to downsize a BCT (4,500 soldiers) to a maneuver battalion task force (1,032 soldiers, with the possibility of upsizing if need be) was formulated. In 2015, a plan was instituted to allow further shrinking of the Army, by converting selected brigades to maneuver battalion task forces. A maneuver battalion task force includes about 1,050 Soldiers rather than the 4,000 in a full BCT. This 9 July 2015 plan, however, would preclude rapid deployment of such a unit until it has been reconstituted back to full re-deployable strength. This is being addressed with the § "Associated units" training program from the Reserve and Guard.

In 2017 the National Defense Strategy and National Security Strategy and a § Sustainable Readiness Model (SRM) managed to halt the cuts. Funding was allocated for two (out of six planned) Security Force Assistance Brigades (SFABs) in 2016 composed of 529 senior officers and senior NCOs (a full chain of command for a BCT). By 2020 all 6 SFABs were activated.

The changes announced so far affect:

- The number of generals and SES's will decrease 25% by 2023, DoD-wide.
- FORSCOM
  - Every HHBN (2-star, and higher, headquarters battalion) reduces by 10%
  - 3rd ABCT, 3rd Infantry Division, Fort Benning
  - 2nd SBCT, 25th Infantry Division, Schofield Barracks
  - 3rd Expeditionary Sustainment Command relocates from Fort Knox to Fort Bragg
  - 1st Theater Sustainment Command relocates from Fort Bragg to Fort Knox
- ARNG
  - 81st Armored Brigade Combat Team, 40th Infantry Division to become an associated unit (SBCT) of 7th Infantry Division (81st's armor assets to be pre-positioned in Europe).

==== Brigade Combat Teams ====
- 1st Armored Division, at Fort Bliss (Texas), regionally aligned with Central Command (CENTCOM)
  - Headquarters and Headquarters Battalion
  - 1st Armored Brigade Combat Team, converted from Stryker BCT on 20 June 2019
  - 2nd Armored Brigade Combat Team
  - 3rd Armored Brigade Combat Team
  - 1st Armored Division Artillery
  - Combat Aviation Brigade
  - Engineer Brigade
  - 1st Armored Division Sustainment Brigade
- 1st Cavalry Division, at Fort Hood (Texas), regionally aligned with European Command (EUCOM)
  - Headquarters and Headquarters Battalion
  - 1st Armored Brigade Combat Team
  - 2nd Armored Brigade Combat Team
  - 3rd Armored Brigade Combat Team
  - 1st Cavalry Division Artillery
  - Combat Aviation Brigade
  - Engineer Brigade
  - 1st Cavalry Division Sustainment Brigade
- 1st Infantry Division, at Fort Riley, (Kansas)
  - Headquarters and Headquarters Battalion
  - 1st Armored Brigade Combat Team
  - 2nd Armored Brigade Combat Team, regionally aligned with African Command (AFRICOM)
  - 1st Infantry Division Artillery
  - Combat Aviation Brigade
  - 1st Infantry Division Sustainment Brigade
- 2nd Infantry Division, at Camp Humphreys (South Korea)
  - Headquarters and Headquarters Battalion
  - 1x Rotation Armored Brigade Combat Team, at Camp Casey, Camp Hovey, and Camp Humphreys, South Korea
  - 2nd Infantry Division Artillery at Camp Humphreys, (South Korea)
  - Combat Aviation Brigade, at Camp Humphreys and K-16 Airfield, South Korea
  - 2nd Infantry Division Sustainment Brigade, at Camp Carroll, Camp Stanley, and Camp Humphreys, South Korea
- 3rd Infantry Division, at Fort Stewart, (Georgia)
  - Headquarters and Headquarters Battalion
  - 1st Armored Brigade Combat Team
  - 2nd Armored Brigade Combat Team
  - 48th Infantry Brigade Combat Team (Georgia Army National Guard)
  - Task Force 1-28: 1st Battalion 28th Infantry Regiment, at Fort Benning, Georgia
  - 3rd Infantry Division Artillery
  - Combat Aviation Brigade, at Hunter Army Airfield, Georgia
  - 3rd Infantry Division Sustainment Brigade
- 4th Infantry Division, at Fort Carson (Colorado), regionally aligned with European Command (EUCOM)
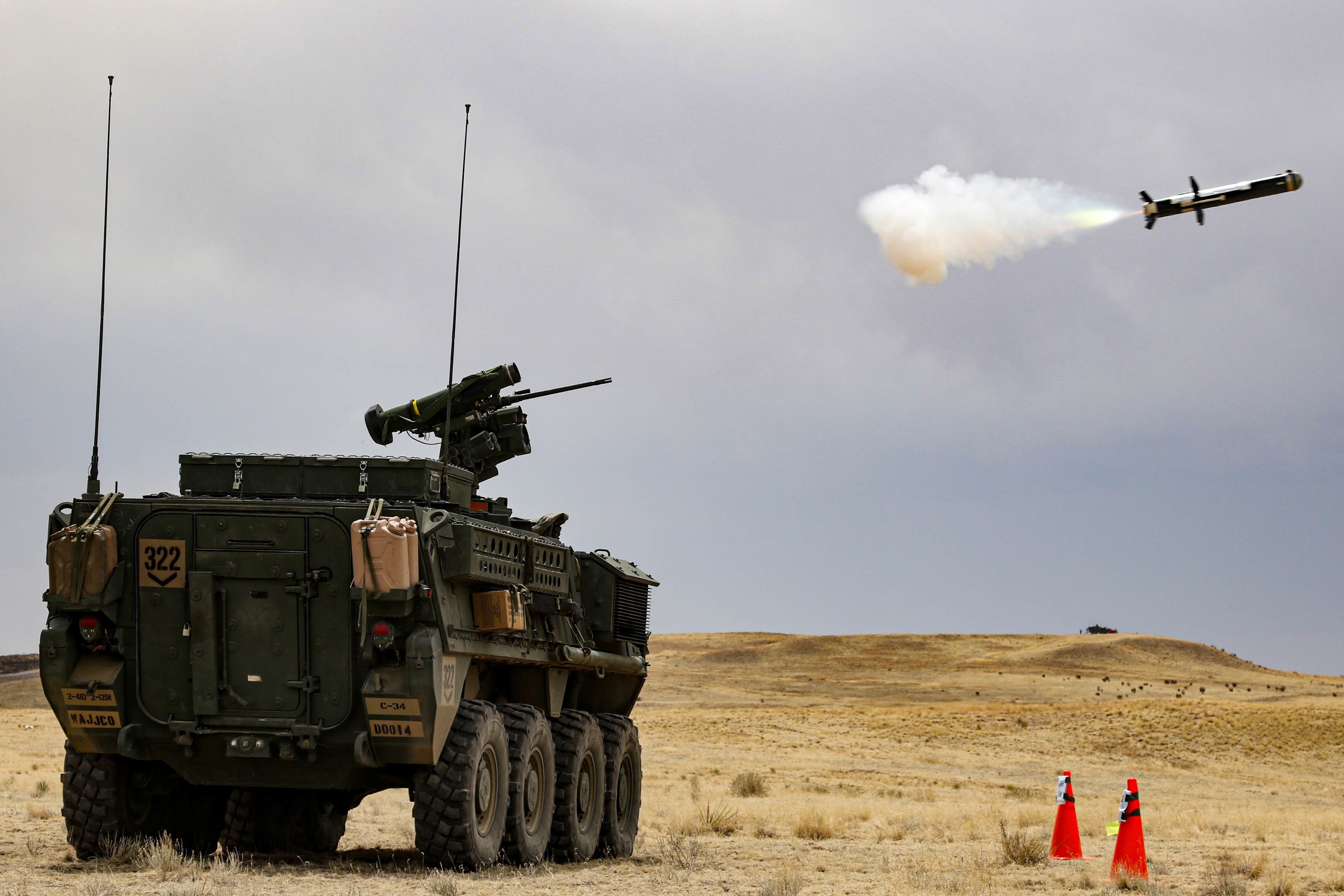
  2nd SBCT/4th ID Stryker fires FGM-148 Javelin, 28 April 2022 at Fort Carson, Colo.
  - Headquarters and Headquarters Battalion
  - 1st Stryker Brigade Combat Team
  - 2nd Stryker Brigade Combat Team
  - 3rd Armored Brigade Combat Team
  - 4th Infantry Division Artillery
  - Combat Aviation Brigade
  - 4th Infantry Division Sustainment Brigade
- 7th Infantry Division (Headquarters only), at Joint Base Lewis-McChord, (Washington)
  - Headquarters and Headquarters Battalion
  - 1st Stryker Brigade Combat Team, 2nd Infantry Division
  - 2nd Stryker Brigade Combat Team, 2nd Infantry Division
  - 81st Stryker Brigade Combat Team (Washington Army National Guard)
- 10th Mountain Division, at Fort Drum, (New York)
  - Headquarters and Headquarters Battalion
  - 1st Infantry Brigade Combat Team
  - 2nd Infantry Brigade Combat Team
  - 3rd Infantry Brigade Combat Team at Fort Polk
  - 10th Mountain Division Artillery
  - Combat Aviation Brigade
  - 10th Mountain Division Sustainment Brigade
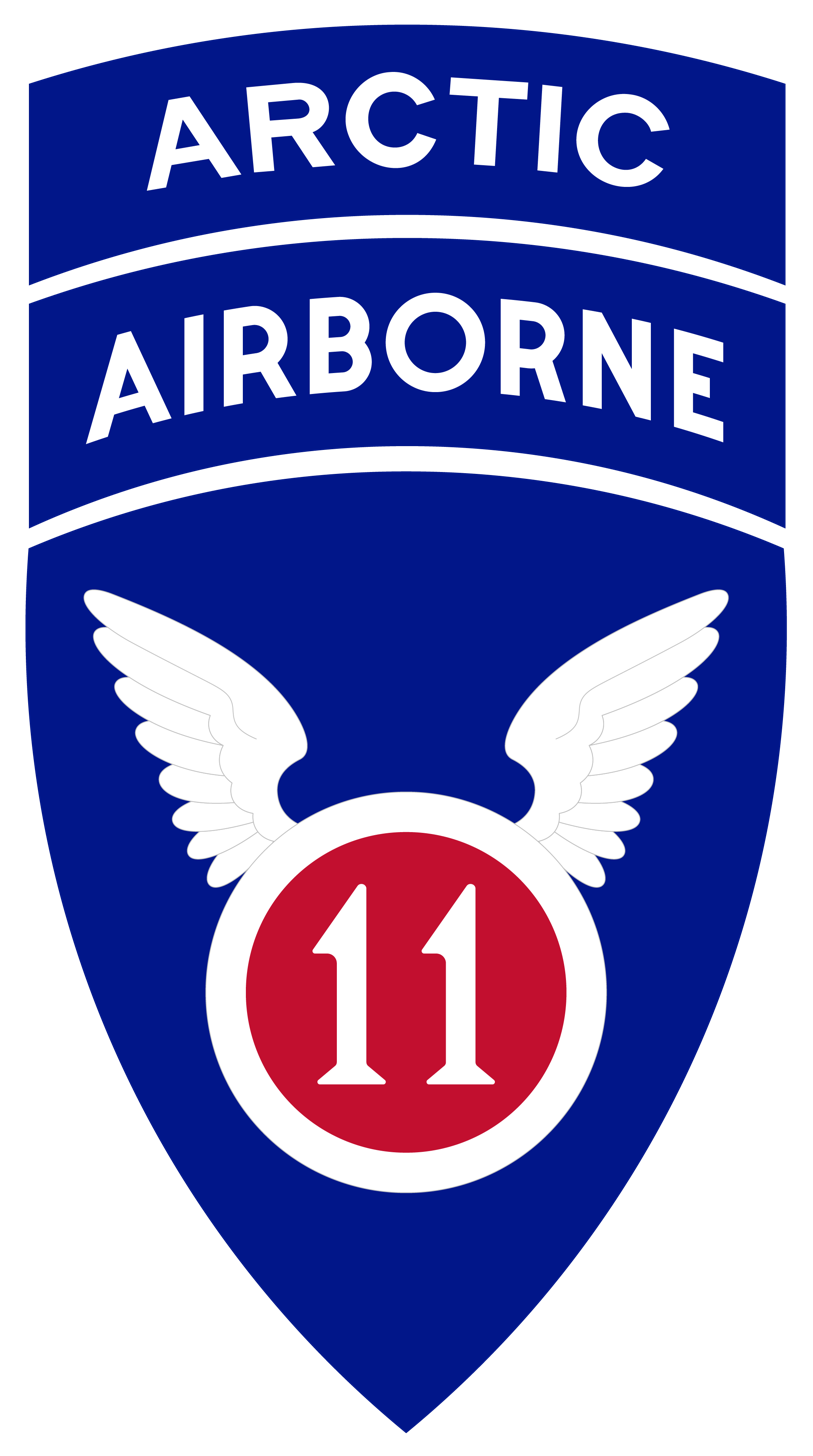
- 11th Airborne Division, at Joint Base Elmendorf-Richardson, (Alaska)
  - Headquarters and Headquarters Battalion
  - 1st Infantry Brigade Combat Team, at Fort Wainwright (Alaska)
  - 2nd Infantry Brigade Combat Team (Airborne), at Joint Base Elmendorf-Richardson, (Alaska)
  - 11th Airborne Division Artillery
  - Arctic Aviation Command
  - Sustainment Brigade
- 25th Infantry Division, at Schofield Barracks (Hawaii)
  - Headquarters and Headquarters Battalion
  - 2nd Infantry Brigade Combat Team
  - 3rd Infantry Brigade Combat Team
  - 25th Infantry Division Artillery
  - Combat Aviation Brigade
  - 25th Infantry Division Sustainment Brigade
- 82nd Airborne Division, at Fort Bragg, (North Carolina)
  - Headquarters and Headquarters Battalion
  - 1st Infantry Brigade Combat Team (Airborne)
  - 2nd Infantry Brigade Combat Team (Airborne)
  - 3rd Infantry Brigade Combat Team (Airborne)
  - 82nd Airborne Division Artillery
  - Combat Aviation Brigade
  - 82nd Airborne Division Sustainment Brigade
- 101st Airborne Division, at Fort Campbell (Kentucky)
  - Headquarters and Headquarters Battalion
  - 1st Infantry Brigade Combat Team (Air Assault)
  - 2nd Infantry Brigade Combat Team (Air Assault)
  - 3rd Infantry Brigade Combat Team (Air Assault)
  - 101st Airborne Division Artillery
  - Combat Aviation Brigade rotates stateside early 2019
  - 101st Airborne Division Sustainment Brigade
- 2nd Cavalry Regiment (Stryker BCT), in Vilseck (Germany)
- 3rd Cavalry Regiment (Stryker BCT), at Fort Hood, (Texas)
- 173rd Airborne Brigade Combat Team, in Vicenza (Italy)

Active-duty divisions

- 11 division headquarters (one division HQ in South Korea)

Active-duty combat brigades: 31 at the end of 2017

- 11 Armored Brigade Combat Teams
  - 1st, 2nd, and 3rd ABCT at Fort Bliss (Texas), part of 1st Armored Division at Fort Bliss (Texas)
  - 1st, 2nd, and 3rd ABCT at Fort Hood (Texas), part of 1st Cavalry Division at Fort Hood (Texas)
  - 1st and 2nd ABCT at Fort Riley (Kansas), part of 1st Infantry Division at Fort Riley (Kansas)
  - 1st and 2nd ABCT at Fort Stewart (Georgia), part of 3rd Infantry Division at Fort Stewart (Georgia)
  - 3rd ABCT at Fort Carson (Colorado), part of 4th Infantry Division at Fort Carson (Colorado)
- 6 Stryker Brigade Combat Teams
  - 1st and 2nd SBCTs at Fort Carson (Colorado), part of 4th Infantry Division at Fort Carson (Colorado)
  - 1st and 2nd SBCT at Fort Lewis (Joint Base Lewis–McChord) (Washington), administratively under the 2nd Infantry Division at Camp Humphreys (South Korea), operationally under the 7th Infantry Division HQ at Joint Base Lewis–McChord (Washington)
  - 2nd Cavalry Regiment (SBCT) at Rose Barracks in Vilseck (Germany), independent SBCT under US Army Europe at Lucius D. Clay Kaserne Barracks (Germany)
  - 3rd Cavalry Regiment (SBCT) at Fort Hood (Texas), independent SBCT under III Corps at Fort Hood (Texas)
- 6 Infantry Brigade Combat Teams (Light)
  - 1st and 2nd IBCT at Fort Drum (New York), part of 10th Mountain Division at Fort Drum (New York)
  - 3rd IBCT at Fort Polk (Louisiana), also part of 10th Mountain Division at Fort Drum (New York)
  - 1st IBCT at Fort Wainwright (Alaska), part of 11th Airborne Division at Joint Base Elmendorf–Richardson (Alaska)
  - 2nd and 3rd IBCT at Schofield Barracks (Hawaii), part of 25th Infantry Division at Schofield Barracks (Hawaii)
- 5 Infantry Brigade Combat Teams (Airborne)
  - 1st, 2nd and 3rd IBCT (Airborne) at Fort Bragg (North Carolina), part of 82nd Airborne Division at Fort Bragg (North Carolina)
  - 2nd IBCT (Airborne) at Joint Base Elmendorf–Richardson (Alaska), part of 11th Airborne Division (Alaska)
  - 173rd Airborne Brigade Combat Team at Caserma Ederle Barracks in Vicenza (Italy), independent brigade under US Army Europe at Lucius D. Clay Kaserne Barracks (Germany)
- 3 Infantry Brigade Combat Teams (Air Assault)
  - 1st, 2nd and 3rd IBCT (Air Assault) at Fort Campbell (Kentucky), part of 101st Airborne Division at Fort Campbell (Kentucky)

See National Guard divisions for the 27 ARNG BCTs

==== Support brigades ====
Active-duty Support Brigades (with reserve-component numbers in parentheses: ARNG/USAR)

- 12 Combat Aviation Brigades (12/2):
  - 12th Combat Aviation Brigade, in Katterbach, (Germany)
  - 16th Combat Aviation Brigade, at Joint Base Lewis-McChord, (Washington)
  - 10 Combat Aviation Brigades as part of active army divisions
- 3 Military Intelligence Brigades (Expeditionary) (2/3):
  - 201st Military Intelligence Brigade, at Joint Base Lewis-McChord, (Washington)
  - 504th Military Intelligence Brigade, at Fort Hood, (Texas)
  - 525th Military Intelligence Brigade, at Fort Bragg, (North Carolina)
- 5 Field Artillery Brigades (8/0):
  - 17th Field Artillery Brigade, at Joint Base Lewis–McChord, (Washington)
  - 18th Field Artillery Brigade, at Fort Bragg, (North Carolina)
  - 41st Field Artillety Brigade, at Grafenwoehr, (Germany)
  - 75th Field Artillery Brigade, at Fort Sill (Oklahoma)
  - 210th Field Artillery Brigade, at Camp Casey, (South Korea)
- 6 Air Defense Artillery Brigades (3/0):
  - 11th Air Defense Artillery Brigade, at Fort Bliss, (Texas)
  - 31st Air Defense Artillery Brigade, at Fort Sill, (Oklahoma)
  - 35th Air Defense Artillery Brigade, at Osan Air Base, (South Korea)
  - 38th Air Defense Artillery Brigade, at Sagami Depot, (Japan)
  - 52nd Air Defense Artillery Brigade, at Sembach, (Germany)
  - 69th Air Defense Artillery Brigade, at Fort Hood, (Texas)
  - 108th Air Defense Artillery Brigade, at Fort Bragg, (North Carolina)
- 5 Engineer Brigades (7/4):
  - 7th Engineer Brigade, Ansbach, (Germany)
  - 20th Engineer Brigade, at Fort Bragg, (North Carolina)
  - 36th Engineer Brigade, at Fort Hood, (Texas)
  - 130th Engineer Brigade, at Schofield Barracks, (Hawaii)
  - 555th Engineer Brigade, at Joint Base Lewis-McChord, (Washington)
- 12 Sustainment Brigades (10/9):
  - 16th Sustainment Brigade, in Bamberg, (Germany)
  - 528th Sustainment Brigade (Special Operations) (Airborne), at Fort Bragg, (North Carolina)
  - Ten Sustainment Brigades as part of active army divisions
- 5 Military Police Brigades (4/4):
  - 8th Military Police Brigade, at Schofield Barracks, (Hawaii)
  - 16th Military Police Brigade, at Fort Bragg, (North Carolina)
  - 18th Military Police Brigade, in Grafenwöhr, (Germany)
  - 42nd Military Police Brigade, at Joint Base Lewis-McChord, (Washington)
  - 89th Military Police Brigade, at Fort Hood, (Texas)
- 1 Transportation Brigade (0/5):
  - 7th Transportation Brigade, at Fort Eustis (Virginia)
- 5 Security Force Assistance Brigades (1/0) 1st in 2017:
  - 1st Security Force Assistance Brigade, at Fort Benning, (Georgia)
  - 2nd Security Force Assistance Brigade, at Fort Bragg, (North Carolina)
  - 3rd Security Force Assistance Brigade, at Fort Hood, (Texas)
  - 4th Security Force Assistance Brigade, at Fort Carson, (Colorado)
  - 5th Security Force Assistance Brigade, at Joint Base Lewis-McChord, (Washington)
- 5 Medical Brigades (0/10):
  - 1st Medical Brigade, at Fort Hood, (Texas)
  - 30th Medical Brigade, in Sembach, (Germany)
  - 44th Medical Brigade, at Fort Bragg, (North Carolina)
  - 62nd Medical Brigade, at Joint Base Lewis-McChord, (Washington)
  - 65th Medical Brigade, at Camp Humphreys, (South Korea)
- 9 Signal Brigades (2/2):
  - 1st Signal Brigade, at Camp Humphreys, (South Korea)
  - 2nd Signal Brigade, in Wiesbaden, (Germany)
  - 11th Signal Brigade, at Fort Hood, (Texas)
  - 22nd Signal Brigade, at Joint Base Lewis-McChord, (Washington)
  - 35th Signal Brigade, at Fort Gordon, (Georgia)
  - 93rd Signal Brigade, at Fort Eustis, (Virginia)
  - 106th Signal Brigade, at Fort Sam Houston, (Texas)
  - 160th Signal Brigade, at Camp Arifjan (Kuwait)
  - 516th Signal Brigade, at Fort Shafter, (Hawaii)
- 1 Chemical Brigade (1/1):
  - 48th Chemical Brigade, at Fort Hood, (Texas)

== See also ==
- Transformation of the Army National Guard
- Revolution in Military Affairs
- Network-centric warfare
