= Government Science College =

Goventment Science College may refer to:

- Government Science College, Bangalore, Karnataka, India
- Government Science College, Jabalpur, Madhya Pradesh, India
- Government Science College, Dhaka, Bangladesh

== See also ==
- Government College of Science, Lahore, Pakistan
