= Unit cohesion =

Military concept

Unit cohesion is a military concept, defined by one former United States Chief of staff in the early 1980s as "the bonding together of soldiers in such a way as to sustain their will and commitment to each other, the unit, and mission accomplishment, despite combat or mission stress". This concept lacks a consensus definition among military analysts, sociologists and psychologists, however.

== History ==
Unit cohesion is a military concept dating back to at least Carl von Clausewitz, if not to antiquity.

Several scholars have cited the influence of Sigmund Freud's thinking on theories of unit cohesion. A number of them noted that Freud wrote of cohesion breakdown among soldiers, asserting that it leads to panic, insubordination, self-interested rather than cooperative reactions to threats, and "a gigantic and senseless dread".

The later development of the concept is strongly informed by the work of Morris Janowitz, who, with Edward Shils, began writing on the topic in the late 1940s. Janowitz continued to work in this area in his sociological work, as the disruptive policy of frequently rotating individual soldiers and officers during the Vietnam War came under scrutiny as a large factor behind low morale.

Following the studies of several World War II armies, sociologists concluded that comradely ties between small combat units is a decisive factor in providing good morale, cohesion, and organization framework.

The defeat of the Western forces by the poorly equipped Chinese People's Liberation Army in the Korean War in 1950 further generated interest on the role of "human elements" on modern battlefields. Although Western armies traditionally created ties between soldiers through informal means such as teamwork or shared hardships instilled by military discipline, the Chinese army relied on formal methods to assimilate recruits into their units. The assimilation process involved features such as coercive persuasion, surveillance, and political control, while military ranks and physical punishments were abolished to allow closer relations between officers and soldiers. The stringent assimilation methods allowed the Chinese to create high morale and cohesion compared to the Western forces. However, high casualty rates and the lack of modern equipment later resulted in a significant erosion of morale and cohesion as the Korean War dragged on. One of the worst cases of this erosion was the partial disintegration of the Chinese army during the spring offensive in May 1951.

In the late 1980s, one researcher stated that, regardless of whether unit cohesion was an actual motivator or merely a stabilizer, what mattered was that unit cohesion "enhanced fighting power", because it reduced "combat inhibitors (stress, fear, isolation)" and promoted "esprit de corps, morale and teamwork". Other research has, however, concluded that there is value in distinguishing the components of social cohesion and "[t]ask cohesion ... the commitment to working together on a shared goal", since some studies conclude that unit effectiveness correlates strongly with task cohesion, not with social cohesion. This debate about the relative importance, or even need for, the concepts of social cohesion and task cohesion is exemplified by an exchange between Anthony King and Guy Siebold in the journal Armed Forces & Society in 2006–2007.

One U.S. military researcher has drawn a distinction between teamwork and unit cohesion—claiming teamwork as being merely "collaboration", while unit cohesion involves a bond that can sustain mutual commitment, not just to the mission, but to each other, and to the group as a whole. This added bond, he argued, enabled teamwork under conditions under which an organization might otherwise break down.

== New uses of unit cohesion in research ==
The concept of cohesion was originally used primarily to examine combat behavior. However, more recently models of cohesion have been applied to other phenomena characterized by stress, uncertainty, and the strategic interaction of groups. Kanesarajah et al. examined the effects of high unit cohesion on mental health outcomes for military personnel and found that higher exposure to traumatic events on deployment was associated with greater risk of PTSD symptoms and that efforts to improve military unit cohesion may help to improve the mental health resilience of military personnel, regardless of their level of traumatic exposure, while Paul Bartone and Amy Adler examined cohesion in a multi-national peacekeeping operation. Terence Lee used a broad concept of cohesion to explain military behavior during events in China in 1989 and Indonesia in 1998 and, in another article, the Philippines in 1986 and Indonesia in 1998.

Lucan Way and Steven Levitsky also used a broad concept of cohesion in order to explain regime maintenance in the former Soviet Union. Jesse Lehrke developed a multi-level model to facilitate the use of both social and task cohesion for examining military behavior during revolutions. Less elaborate versions of this approach can also be seen in work by Dale Herspring and earlier work by Jesse Lehrke.

== See also ==
- Auftragstaktik
- Command (military formation)
- Fragging
- Fraternization
- Unit cohesion in the United States military
