= Greater Sylhet Development and Welfare Council in UK =

- ইউ কে বৃহত্তর সিলেট উন্নয়ন ও কল্যাণ কাউন্সিল
- Abbreviation: GSC
- Formation: 1993
- Type: Voluntary charity
- Purpose: Social welfare
- Headquarters: 135 Commercial Street, Aldgate, Tower Hamlets, London, England
- Region served: United Kingdom
- Official language: Bengali, Sylheti, English
- Chairman: Barrister Ataur Rahman
- General secretary: Khusru Khan
- Treasurer: Saleh Ahmed
- Website: www.gscuk.org

Greater Sylhet Development and Welfare Council in UK (Bengali: ইউ কে বৃহত্তর সিলেট উন্নয়ন ও কল্যাণ কাউন্সিল; often abbreviated as GSC) is a British voluntary charity for the welfare of Sylheti Bangladeshi people living in the United Kingdom.

== Premise ==
Greater Sylhet Development and Welfare Council (GSC) in UK is a voluntary organisation established in 1993, representing Bangladeshis in the UK. It is a nationwide charity working for the welfare of British Bangladeshi people living in the UK who originate from the division of Sylhet, who make up 90% of Britain's 500,000 Bangladeshis.

The organisation is run by an elected National Executive Committee and is governed by a constitution. It has 13 regional committees working with the same charter of welfare for the Bangladeshi community living in various regions throughout the UK. It works towards helping and raising money for charitable causes

== See also ==
- British Bangladeshi
- List of British Bangladeshis
