= Global Combat Support System =

The Global Combat Support System (GCSS) is a web-based automated logistics system, for use by U.S. Department of Defense logistics specialists. This tool aids the specialists as they plan, and provide for, the materiel requirements for combat support.

Northrop Grumman performed the work on the Army version of the system, which is known as GCSS-Army.

This web-based system provides the current status of requisitions. For example, if replenishment supplies were requested, GCSS provides updates of the current location of those supplies, with their expected time of arrival. It replaces SARSS, the standard Army retail supply system interface.

Global Combat Support Systems-Marine Corps (GCSS-MC) has updated its capability with its own software development, in-house.

== Effectiveness ==
A GAO report estimates that the Army will achieve $11.8 billion in savings and financial benefits.

== Tablets for GCSS ==
Tablet computers with bar code readers will be used in the Army GCSS for tracking logistics, supplies, and finances.
