= Security Force Assistance Command =

Division-level command of the U.S. Army

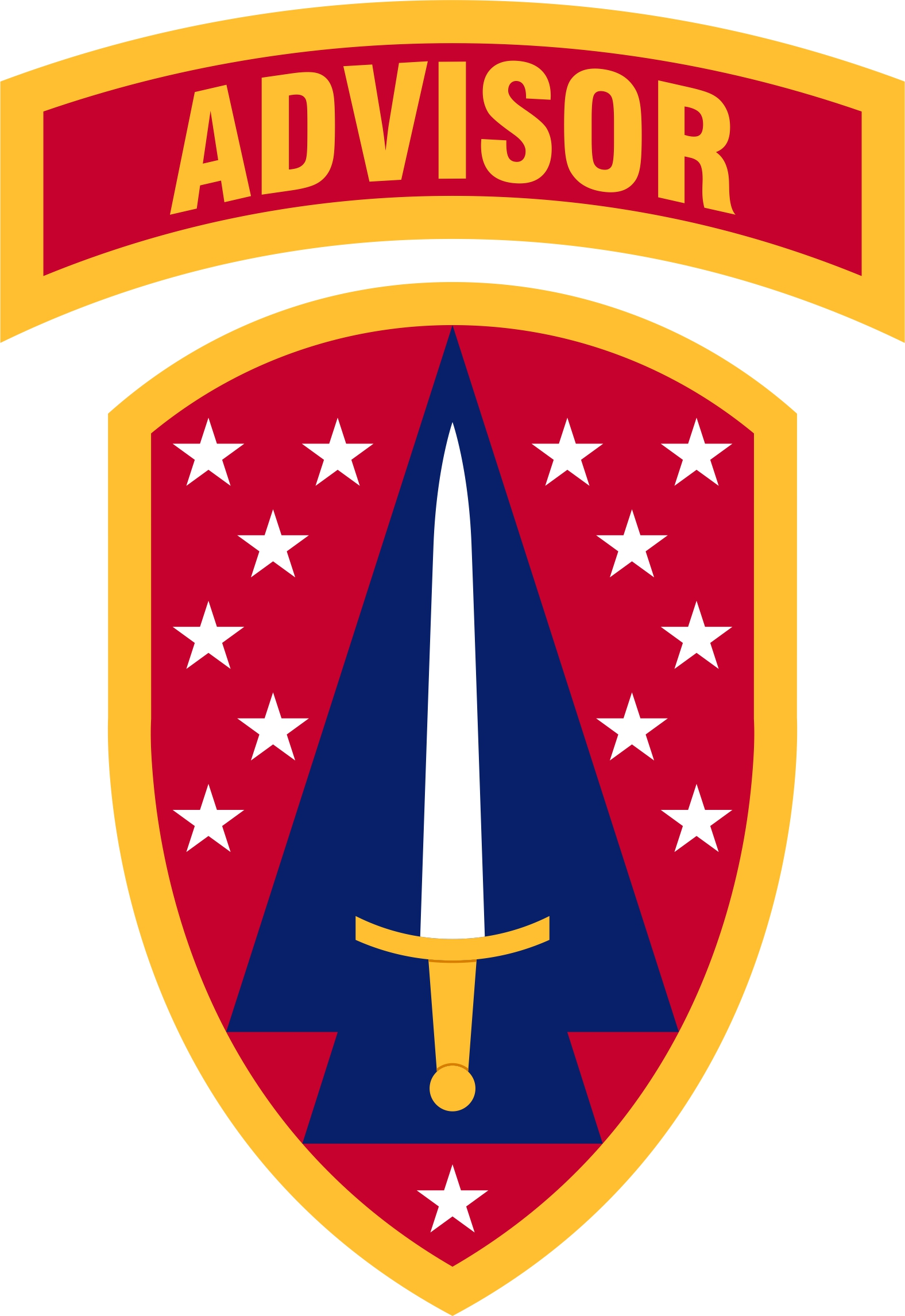
- Shoulder sleeve insignia
- Active: November 2018 – January 2026
- Country: United States of America
- Branch: United States Army
- Type: Division-level command
- Role: Train and advise foreign militaries Security force assistance
- Part of: US Army Forces Command
- Garrison/HQ: Fort Bragg, North Carolina
- Color of berets: Brown
- Website: Official Facebook page

Commanders
- Commanding General: BG Kevin J. Lambert
- Initial commander: BG Mark H. Landes

Insignia
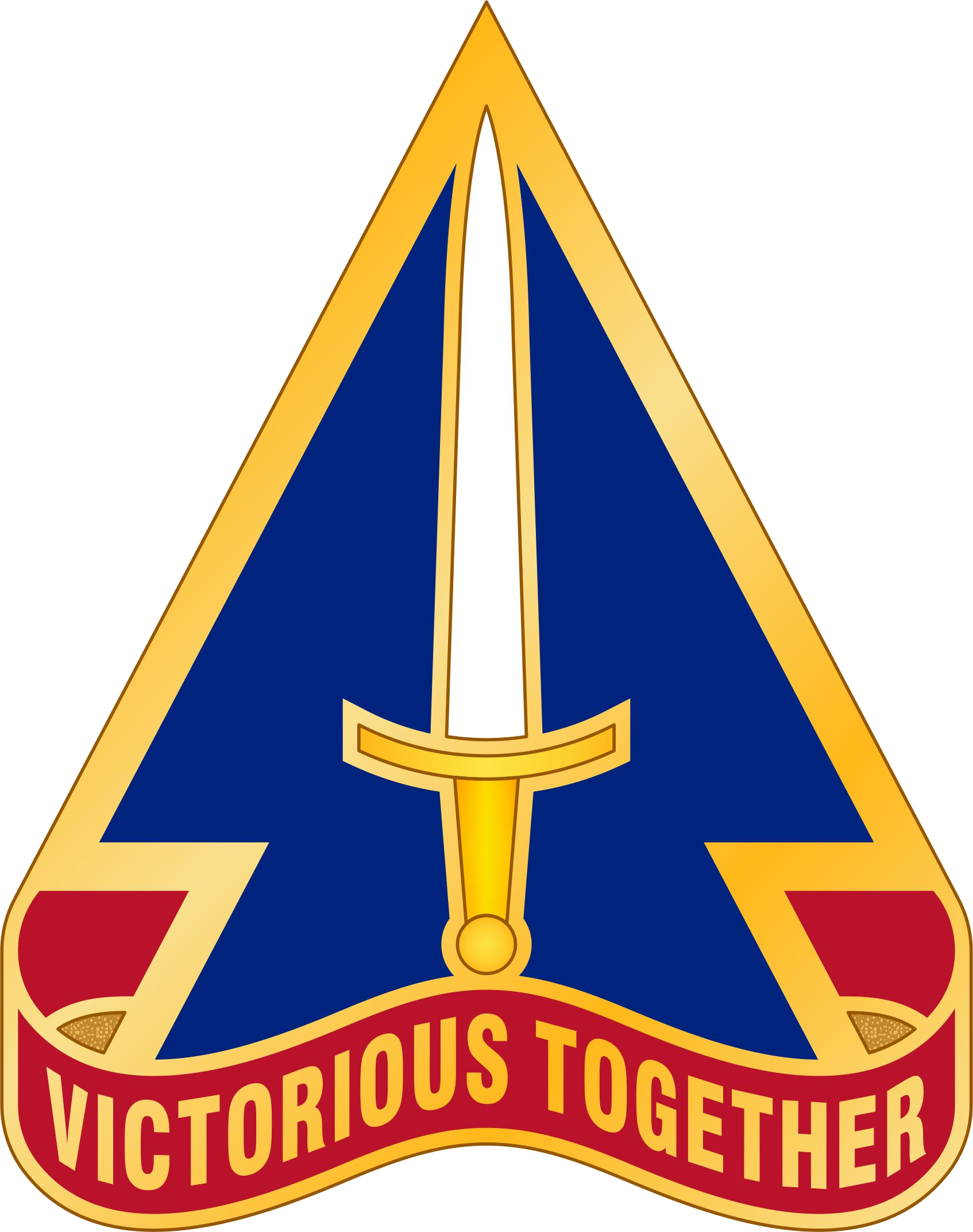
- Distinctive unit insignia

- Beret flash

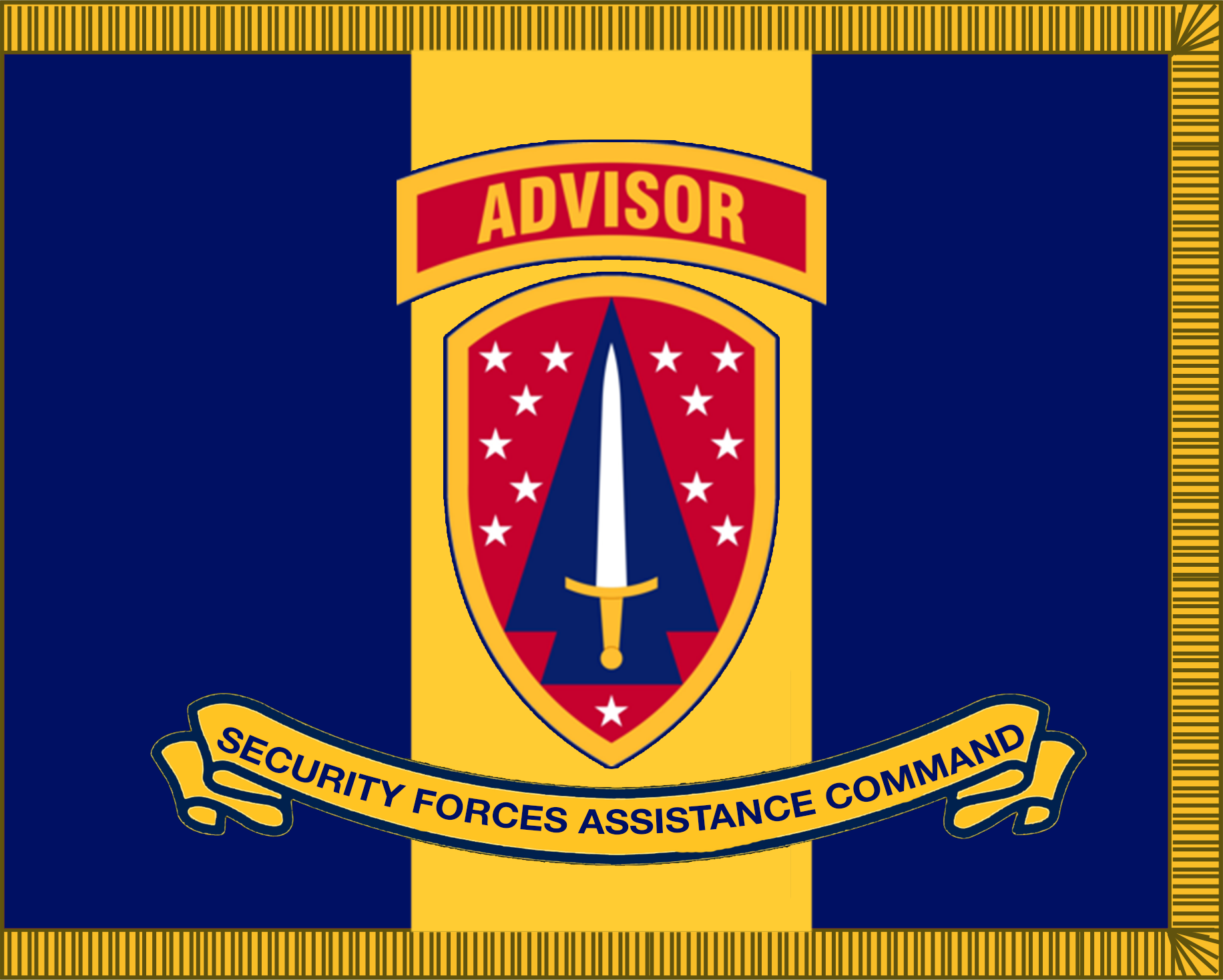
- US Army Security Force Assistance Command Flag

The Security Force Assistance Command (SFAC) was a division-level command element for the United States Army's Security Force Assistance Brigades (SFAB). These units' core mission is security force assistance to conduct training, advising, assisting, enabling and accompanying operations with allied and partner nations.

== History ==
SFAB has its roots in Security Force Assistance training and doctrine. The original Military Assistance Training Advisor (MATA) course was established in 1962 as part of the U.S. Army Special Warfare School. It prepared conventional U.S. Army officers and Non-Commissioned Officers (NCOs) for assignments as advisors to Vietnamese Army units. Instructors were Special Forces NCOs who were trained in conducting advisor missions. One notable feature of the school was the “MATA Mile” – a running course through the woods alongside Gruber Road at Fort Bragg. Students were provided with ST 31-179, MATA Handbook for Vietnam (January 1966). The SFABs carry on the SFA mission of training foreign conventional forces today.

== Overview ==
"Soldiers:" A Security Force Assistance Brigade overview video (4:08)

The SFAC was a U.S. Army command which grouped and coordinated the SFABs. The mission of the SFAB was to carry out train, advise, and assist (TAA) missions overseas with foreign nation military partners. SFABs are the United States Army's latest, and most potent solution to providing dedicated and trained personnel to relieve the brigade combat teams from performing combat advisory missions. Prior to the formation of SFABs, the combat advisory role was filled by NCOs and officers detailed from the brigade combat teams to train host nation military forces; leaving critical leadership billets unfilled. The introduction of the SFAB concept is intended to relieve the brigade combat teams of the combat advisory mission and enable them to focus on their primary combat mission. Operating in units with roughly 800 personnel, SFABs are designed to be versatile and deployable worldwide and are made up exclusively of non-commissioned officers and commissioned officers however E-4s with promotable status are accepted and receive promotion to sergeant (E-5) upon graduation of MATA.

SFABs are conventional units composed of volunteers recruited from units across the Regular Army. Volunteers undergo a week-long assessment and selection program at Fort Benning, GA which evaluates a candidate's physical fitness, decision-making, problem solving, and communications skills as well as their ethics and morals. Candidates that complete the assessment and selection program are assigned to an active SFAB, where they will be scheduled to attend the MATA and other follow on courses specific to their MOS.Trainees may receive additional language training, culture training, foreign weapons training and medical training, among other topics. The SFABs are equipped with secure, but unclassified communications gear, utilizing T2C2 systems.

=== SFAB organizational structure ===
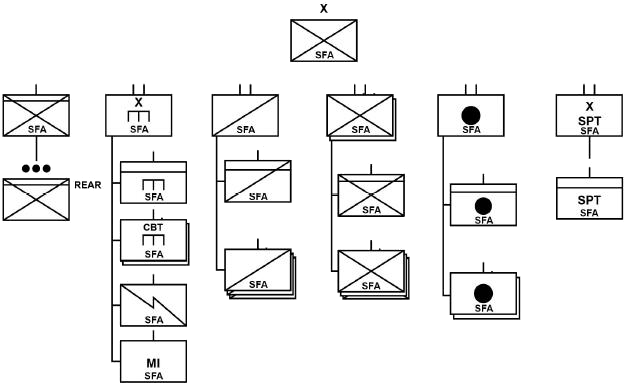
Infantry security force assistance brigade structure

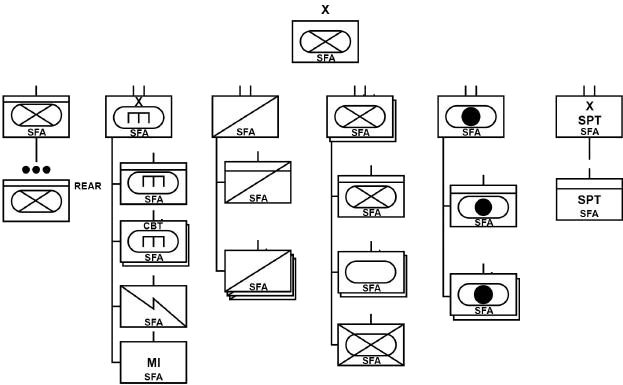
Armored security force assistance brigade structure

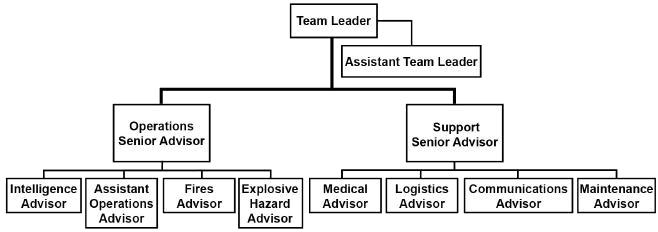
Security force assistance brigade advising team structure

Former Brigades of the Security Force Assistance Command
Unit Name	Shoulder sleeve insignia	Distinctive Unit insignia	Beret flash	Unit Location
1st Security Force Assistance Brigade (reflagged as Army Security Cooperation Group–South)				Fort Benning, Georgia
2nd Security Force Assistance Brigade (deactivated November 2025)				Fort Bragg, North Carolina
3rd Security Force Assistance Brigade				Fort Cavazos, Texas
4th Security Force Assistance Brigade				Fort Carson, Colorado
5th Security Force Assistance Brigade				Joint Base Lewis-McChord, Washington
54th Security Force Assistance Brigade (National Guard)				HHC: Indiana, 1st Battalion: Georgia, 2nd & 3rd Battalions: Florida, 4th Battalion: Texas, 5th Battalion: Ohio, and 6th Battalion: Illinois
