= Security Force Assistance Brigade =

Specialized type of United States Army unit

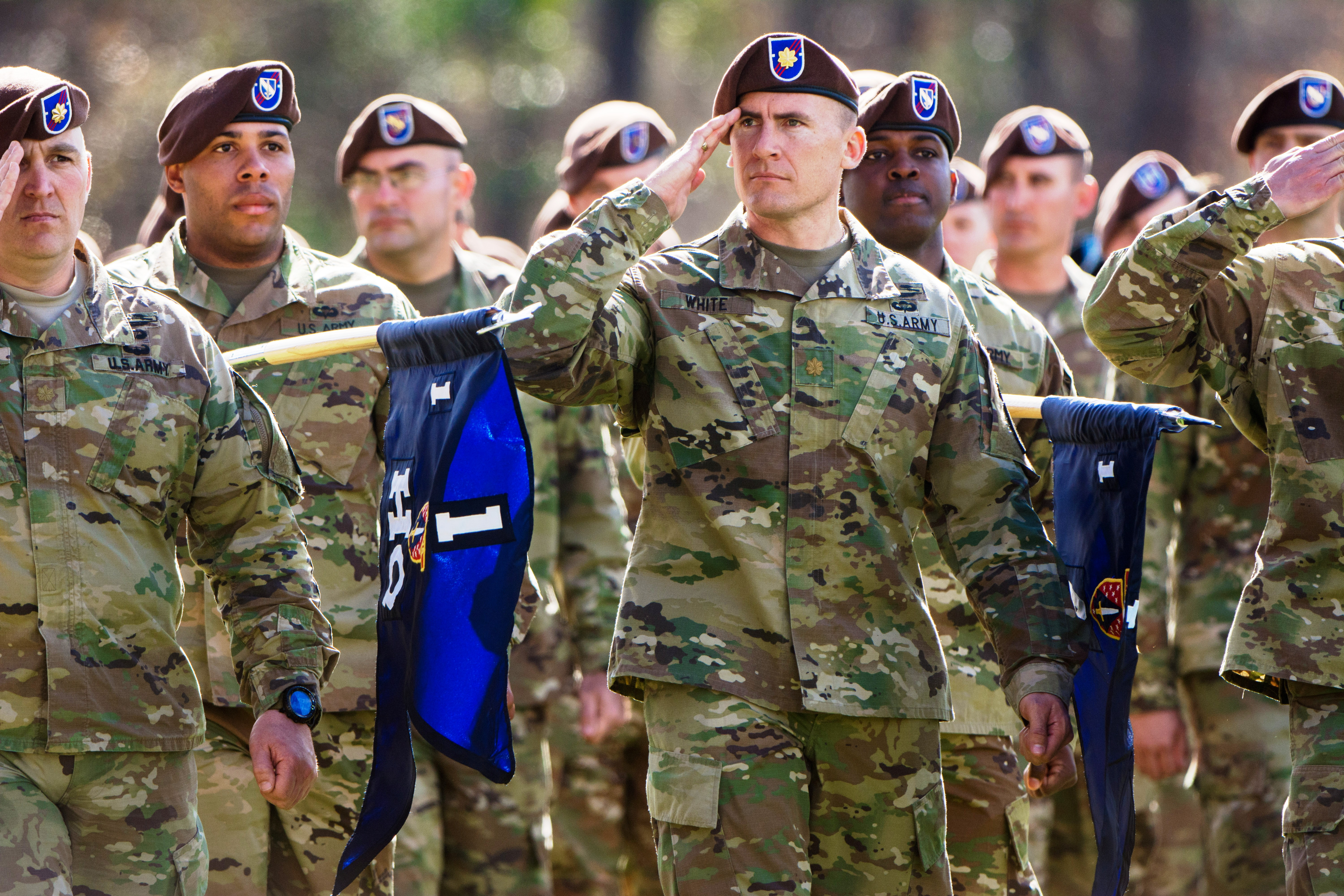
1st Security Force Assistance Brigade activation ceremony

A Security Force Assistance Brigade (SFAB) (pronounced ESS-fab) is a specialized United States Army unit formed to conduct security force assistance (SFA) missions: to train, advise, assist, enable and accompany operations with allied and partner state armed forces. SFABs are intended to reduce the burden of such irregular operations on conventionally focused forces, allowing conventional maneuver divisions and brigades to focus on decisive, regular battle.

Designed on the model of a standard infantry brigade combat team, SFABs are composed of roughly 800 personnel, primarily commissioned and non-commissioned officers selected from regular and Army National Guard units and given additional training at the Military Advisor Training Academy (MATA) at Fort Benning, Georgia.

== History ==
During the War in Afghanistan (2001-2021) and the War in Iraq (2003-2010) the Department of Defense attempted to build foreign armies, other military forces, police forces, and other security forces.

United States MiTTs trained the Iraqi Army and National Police and ETTs did the same in Afghanistan. Training over 350,000 soldiers and police between the two nations MiTTs and ETTs were heavily employed but suffered from a lack of standardization in programs of instructions, force structure, and selection criteria. Trying to draw lessons from these experiences the U.S. Army utilized portions of Brigade Combat Teams (BCTs) as Regionally Aligned Forces (RAF). Utilizing BCTs as RAF as the primary mechanism to deliver training and assistance did improve performance. However, as the primary role of brigade combat teams were seen as winning in conventional regular warfare, rather than irregular operations, RAFs were not seen as sufficient. Therefore, Security Force Assistance Brigades were created as a dedicated answer from 2017.

From August 2017 to May 2020 the Army established six Security Force Assistance Brigades (SFABs). Originally designed to provide advice, assist, and accompany capabilities to Afghan, Iraqi, and Peshmerga Security Forces, the Army reorganized SFABs in 2019 to meet the global challenges inherent to strategic competition. With the completion of global alignment in summer 2021, SFABs transitioned and assumed a role the Secretary and Chief of Staff of the Army described as "the Army's leading edge of campaigning." In addition to providing Combatant Commands' persistent, predictable, and effective capabilities during competition, SFABs help marshal United States allies and partners. SFABs' role in crisis and conflict has not only been tested during Combat Training Center rotations and Warfighter Exercises, it was put to use as part of EUCOM and NATO's assure and deter operations during Russia's invasion of Ukraine in February 2022.

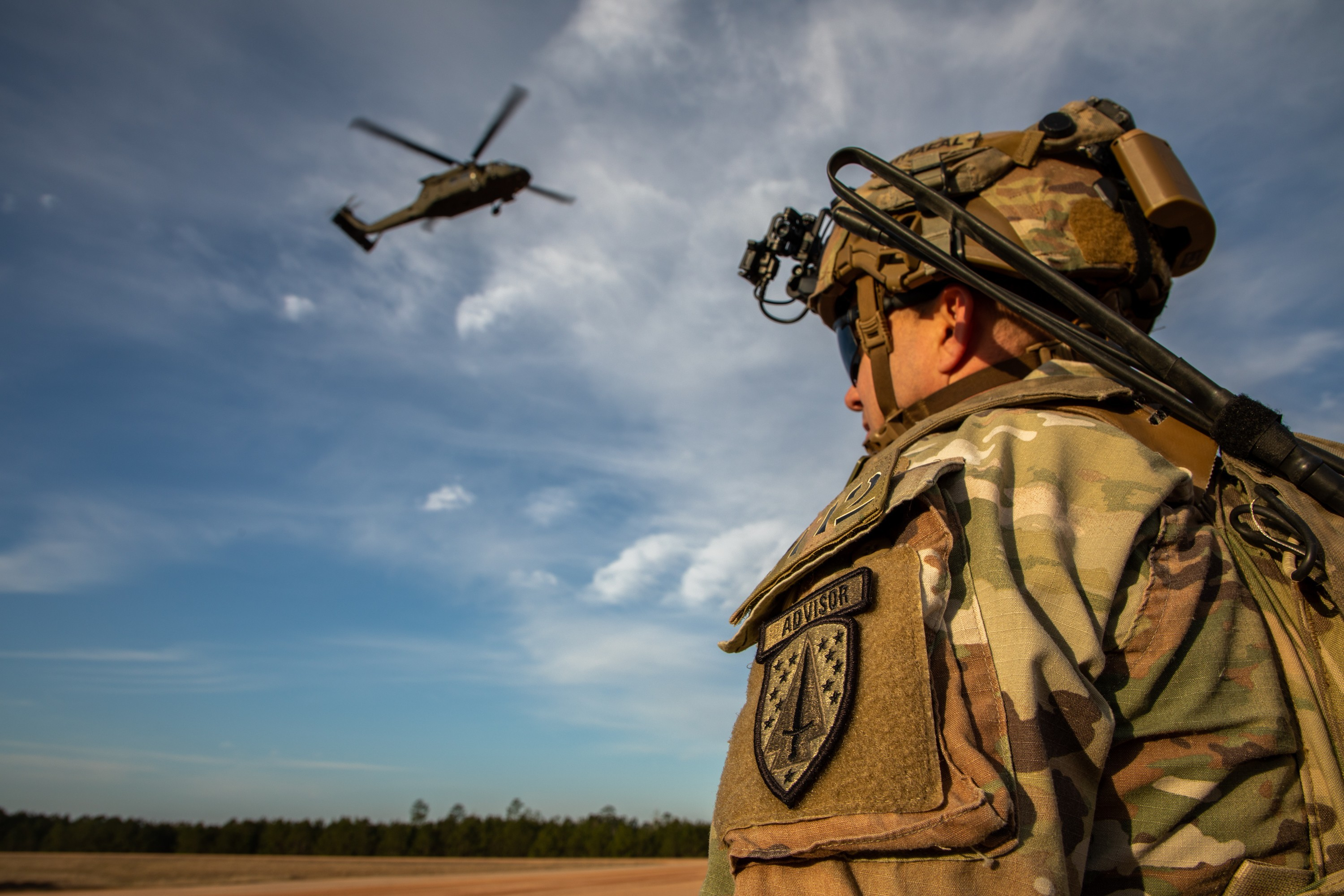
Security Force Assistance Command

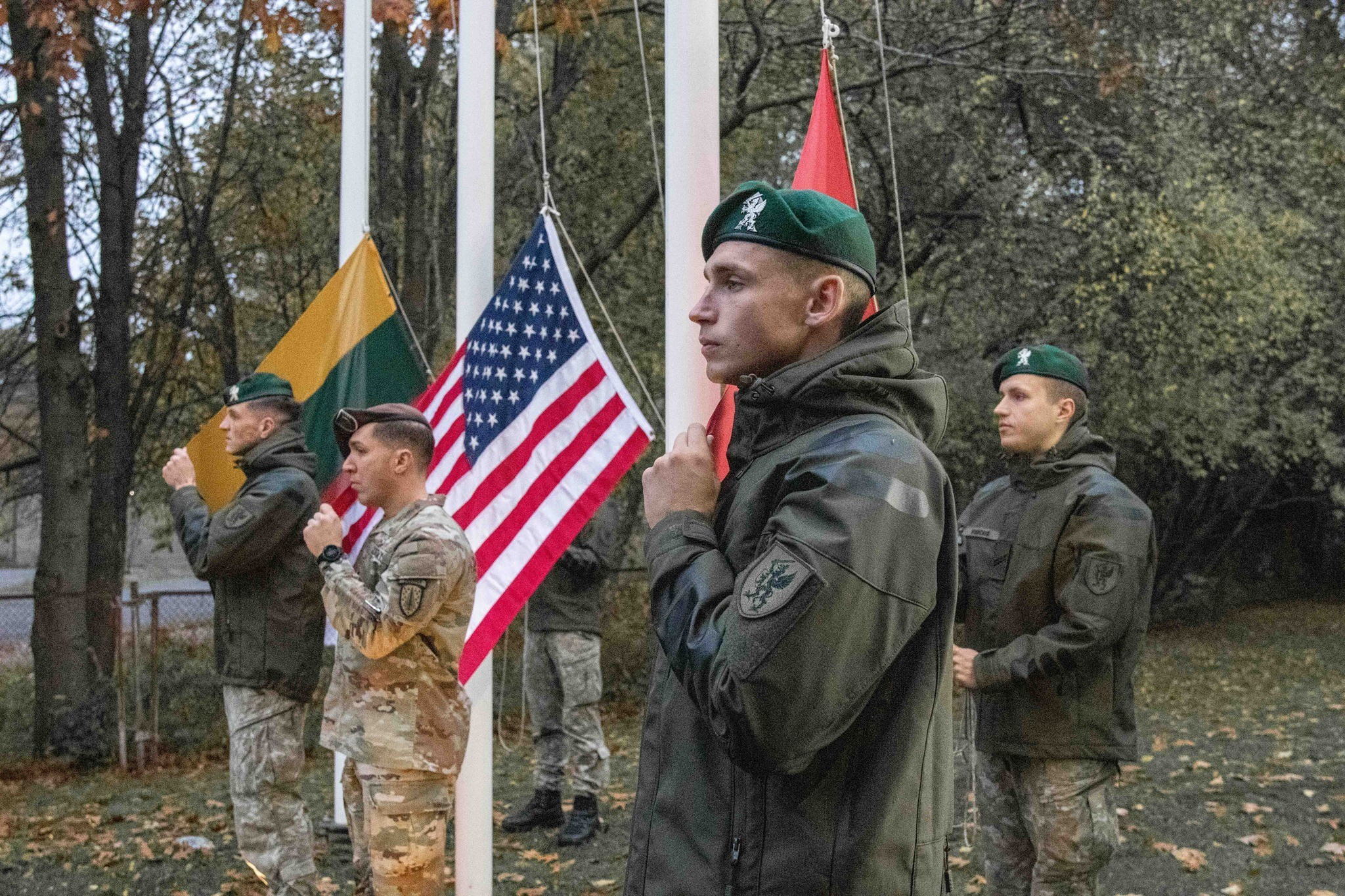
4th Security Force Assistance Brigade

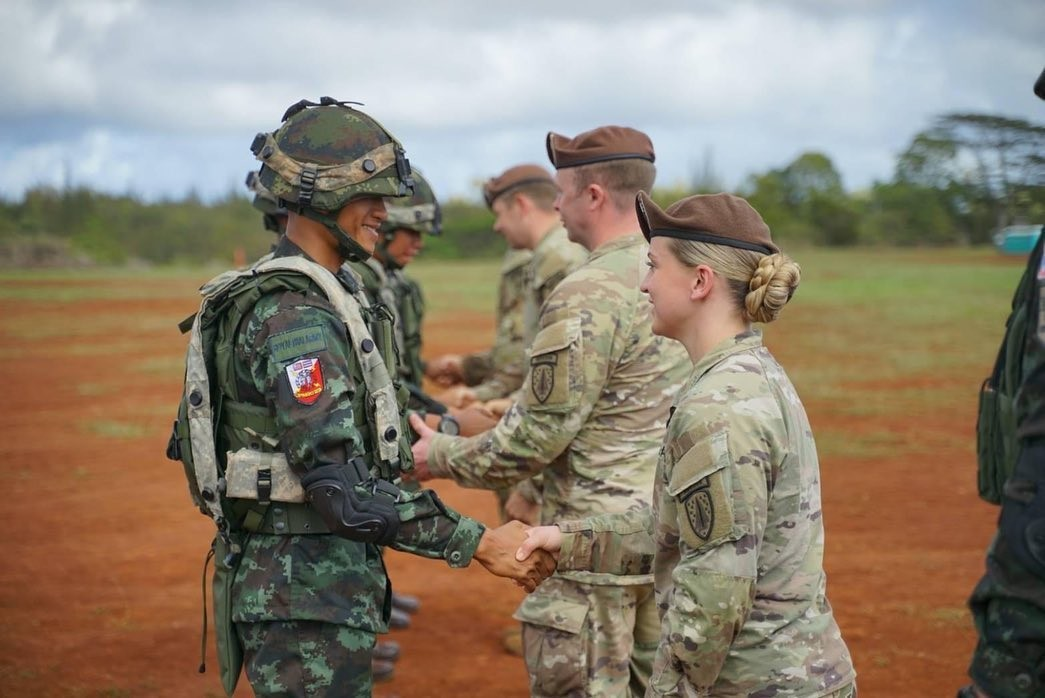
5th Security Force Assistance Brigade

== Overview ==
"Soldiers:" A Security Force Assistance Brigade overview video (4:08)

The mission of the SFAB is to carry out training, advise, and assist (TAA) missions overseas with foreign nation military partners. SFABs are the United States Army's latest solution to providing dedicated and trained personnel to relieve the Brigade Combat Teams from performing combat advisory missions. Combat advisory is not seen as a primary combat mission.

Before the creation of SFABs, the combat advisory role was filled by non-commissioned officers and commissioned officers detailed from the Brigade Combat Teams to train host nation military forces, leaving critical leadership billets unfilled. Operating in units with roughly 800 personnel, SFABs are designed to be versatile and deployable worldwide and are made up exclusively of NCOs and officers, however E-4s with promotable status are accepted and receive promotion to sergeant (E-5) upon graduation of MATA.

SFABs are conventional units composed of volunteers recruited from units across the Regular Army. Volunteers undergo a five-day assessment at Fort Benning which evaluates a candidate's physical fitness, decision-making, problem solving, and communications skills as well as their ethics and morals. All SFAB volunteers then attend MATA training. Trainees may receive additional language training, culture training, foreign weapons training and medical training, among other topics. The SFABs are equipped with secure, but unclassified communications gear, utilizing T2C2 (Transportable Tactical Command Communications) systems, a novel type of backpack satellite voice and data terminals. United States Army Communications-Electronics Command is augmenting this equipment with vehicle-mounted and hand-carried radios.

In March 2020, Logistics Advisor Team 1610, 6th Battalion, 1st Security Force Assistance Brigade delivered a Vehicle Maintenance and Recovery Course to the Senegalese Army in Dakar, Senegal. This was 1st SFAB's first mission in USARAF's area of responsibility.

The creation of SFABs is part of a broader trend by the Defense Department to free line troops from the perceived distraction of military aid and assistance to weak, fragile states. The aim is to try to stand up capable security institutions within weaker states. However, it is unlikely that the SFABs will be able to overcome the "three SFA traps" of trying to create an effective military in a state that cannot afford one; political leadership that views their army as a threat; or political leadership that uses that army against rivals in an unconstitutional fashion.

=== SFAB Structure ===
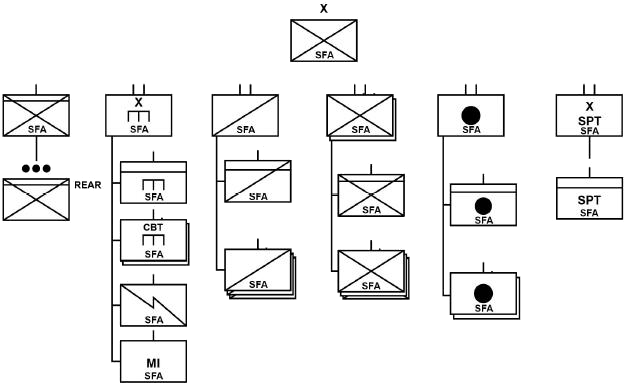
Infantry security force assistance brigade structure

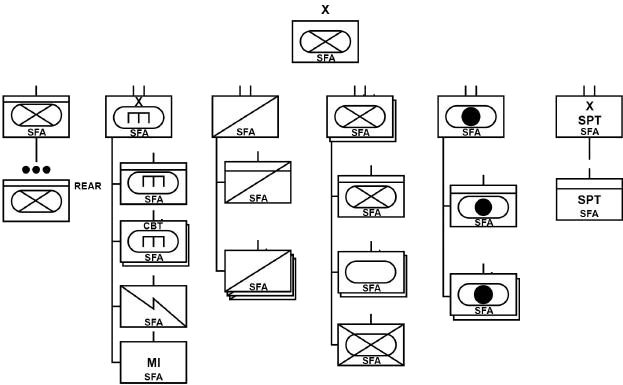
Armored security force assistance brigade structure

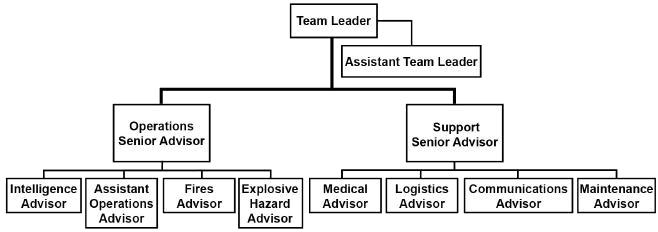
Security force assistance brigade advising team structure

Each Security Force Assistance Brigade consists of about 800 senior and noncommissioned officers.

According to Drew Brooks from The Fayetteville Observer, members of the brigade are picked on voluntary basis among the best soldiers of other units across the Army. While not all personnel in the Brigade are meant to be advisors, all personnel are meant to be able to deploy. According to SOF News, the brigade requires over seventy different military occupational specialties, including infantry, medics, intelligence analysts, and logistics personnel.

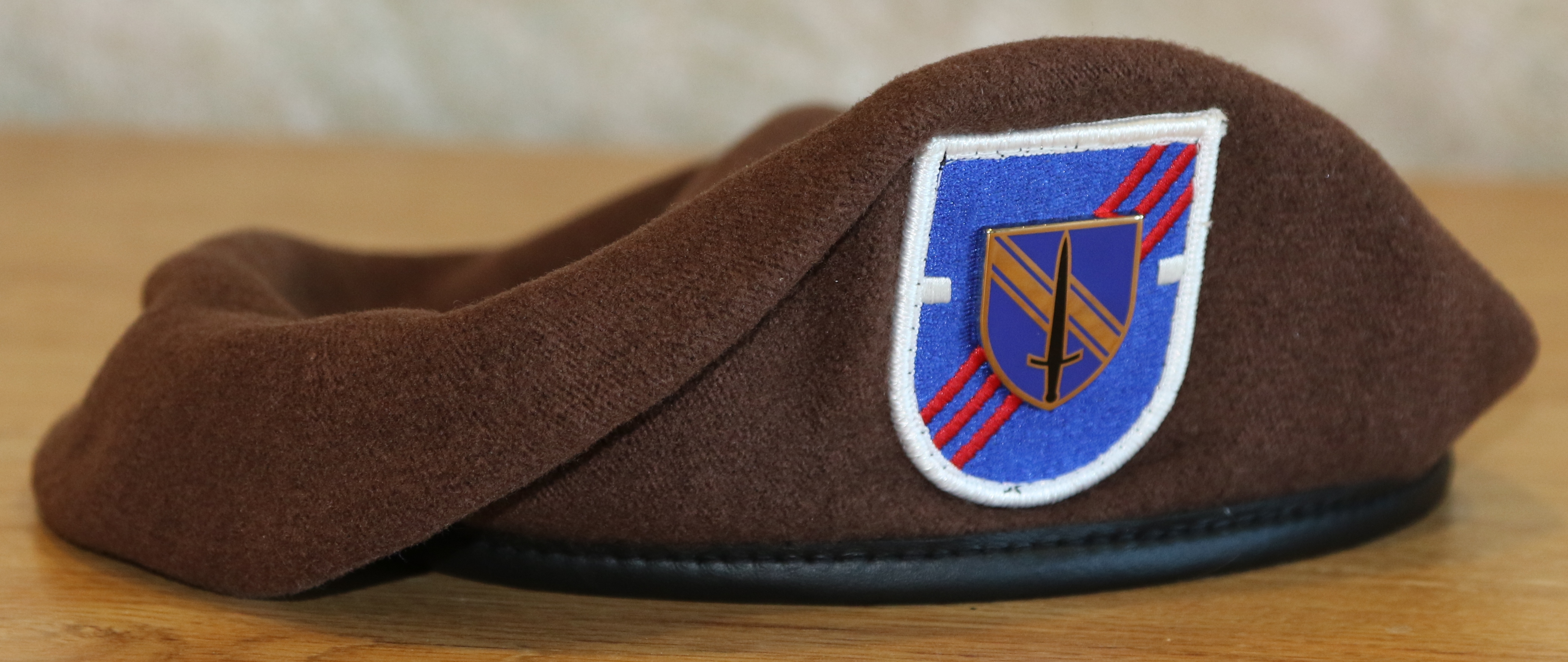
Brown beret of the SFABs (1st SFAB flash and DUI depicted)

The 1st Security Force Assistance Brigade was the first SFAB raised in the United States Army. Based in Fort Benning, Georgia the 1st SFAB is made up of the first graduates of MATA and are under the command of Colonel Christopher Landers and Command Sergeant Major Christopher Goodart. On February 8, 2018, the 1st SFAB held its official activation ceremony at the National Infantry Museum on Fort Benning, Georgia. The Army plans to raise a total of six SFABs, five of which will be in the active duty Army, and one in the Army National Guard. The Indiana Army National Guard is providing the headquarters for the newly designated 54th SFAB. 1st Battalion is being organized by the Georgia Army National Guard. Two battalions are being organized by the Florida Army National Guard, the 3rd Squadron, 54th Cavalry, and the 2nd Infantry Battalion.

According to Meghann Myers, the U.S. Army prioritized installations that are also home to divisions, with a two-star general on site to provide guidance and facilitate training, as homes for the Security Force Assistance Brigades.

On May 18, 2018, the Army announced that the Security Force Assistance Command (SFAC) will be established at Fort Bragg. This division-level Command, led by a Brigadier General, will oversee the Army's six Security Force Assistance Brigades, as well as the MATA for SFAB training and oversight. SFAC and 2nd SFAB were activated on 3 December 2018 at Fort Bragg; BG Mark Landes and BG Donn Hill are the Commanding Generals of SFAC and 2nd SFAB, respectively.

By 2020, the SFABs are to include missions to US Central Command, US Southern Command, US Indo-Pacific Command, and US Africa Command. According to a US military journal, "such specialized security force assistance units is a stopgap measure that frees up more resources for conventional warfare, allowing the rest of the US military to focus on combined-arms training and equipping for conflict and competition with China and Russia."

Army officials told the press in May 2025 that the 4th and 54th Security Force Assistance Brigades will be deactivated, with no timeline announced, freeing up seasoned soldiers for duty in traditional line units, leaving the Army with four operational SFABs.

The Army announced that as of November 2025, the 2nd Security Force Assistance Brigade has been deactivated at a ceremony on Fort Bragg, North Carolina on the 26th of November 2025

== SFAB recruiting ==
The SFAB Recruiting and Retention Team was formed to provide SFAB leader development briefs and recruit Army-wide Soldiers and leaders for SFAB opportunities. Eligible Soldiers volunteer for SFAB assignments by completing two SFAB Volunteer forms DA Form 4187 (Personnel Request) and SF 600 (Medical Screening) and e-mailing both to the Human Resources Command (HRC) SFAB Team for screening. On May 15, 2018, Army officials released new guidance on the Army's Selective Retention Bonus (SRB) Program, which includes first-ever bonuses up to $52,000 for those who reenlist for critical Security Forces Assistance Brigade positions.

== List of Security Force Assistance Brigades ==
Security Force Assistance Units
Unit name	Shoulder sleeve insignia	Distinctive unit insignia	Beret flash	Unit location	Aligned to	Status
Security Force Assistance Command				Fort Bragg, North Carolina		Deactivated as of 12 January 2026
1st Security Force Assistance Brigade				Fort Benning, Georgia	SOUTHCOM	Deactivated then redesignated Army Security Cooperation Group–South on 27 January 2026
2nd Security Force Assistance Brigade				Fort Bragg, North Carolina	AFRICOM	Deactivated as of 26 November 2025
3rd Security Force Assistance Brigade				Fort Hood, Texas	CENTCOM	Active (set to deactivate late 2026)
4th Security Force Assistance Brigade				Fort Carson, Colorado	EUCOM	Deactivated January 2026
5th Security Force Assistance Brigade				Joint Base Lewis-McChord, Washington	INDOPACOM	Active
54th Security Force Assistance Brigade (National Guard)				HHC: Indiana, 1st Battalion: Georgia, 2nd & 3rd Battalions: Florida, 4th Battalion: Texas, 5th Battalion: Ohio, and 6th Battalion: Illinois		Active; Slated for deactivation 20 November 2026

== See also ==
- United States Security Assistance Organizations
- 11th Security Force Assistance Brigade - British Army equivalent.
