= Mark H. Landes =

U.S. Army lieutenant general

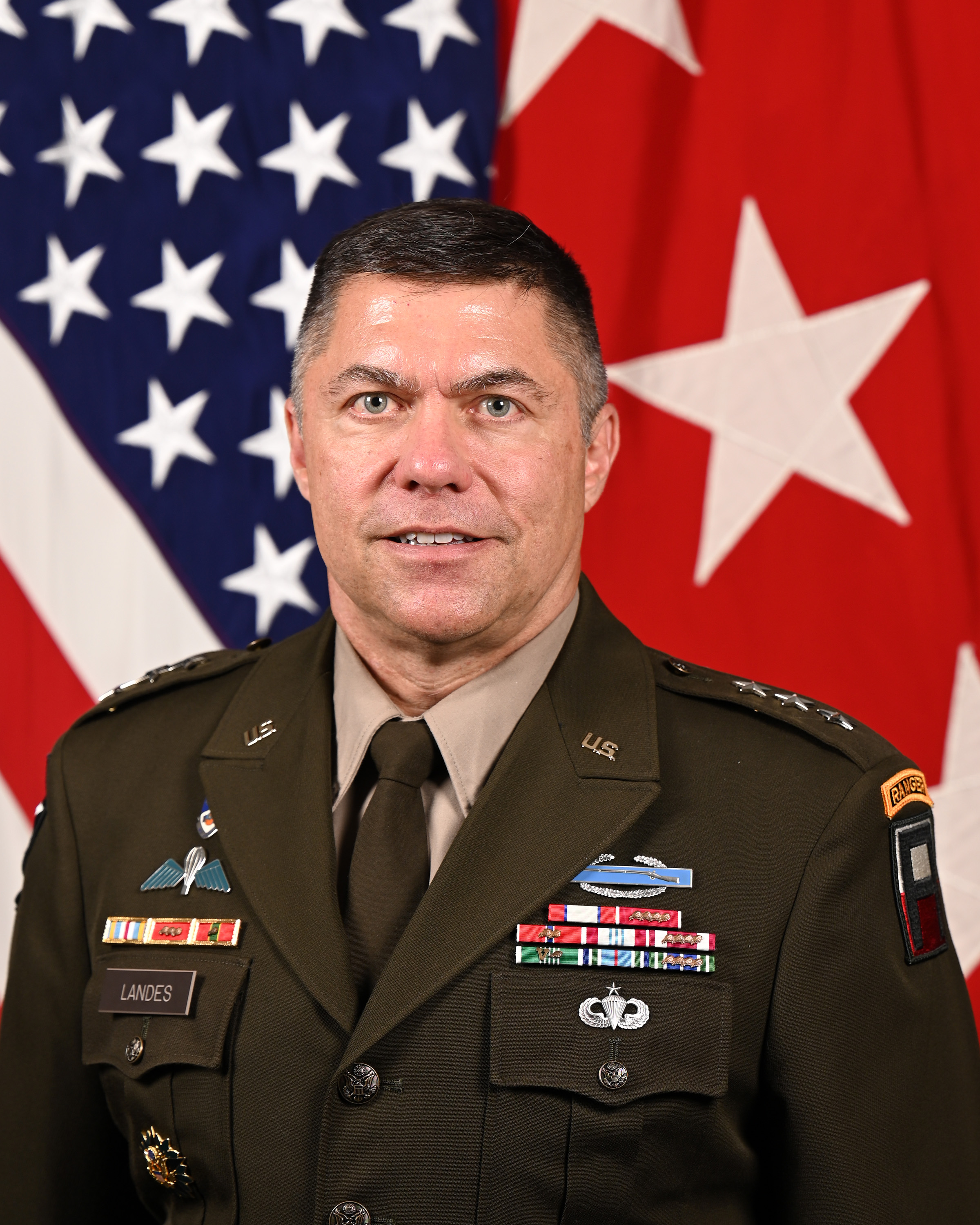
- Born: 19 May 1968 (age 58); Kingsport, Tennessee, U.S.
- Alma mater: United States Military Academy (BS); Tennessee Technological University (MBA); United States Army Command and General Staff College; Yale University (United States Army War College fellowship)
- Spouse: Morri Nichols
- Children: 2
- Military career
- Branch: United States Army
- Service years: 1990–present
- Rank: Lieutenant General
- Unit: U.S. Army Infantry Branch
- Commands: First United States Army; First Army Division East; Security Force Assistance Command; 3rd Brigade, 1st Armored Division; 2nd Battalion, 23rd Infantry Regiment
- Conflicts: Iraq War; War in Afghanistan; Operation Inherent Resolve
- Awards: Army Distinguished Service Medal; Legion of Merit (5); Bronze Star Medal (3); Defense Meritorious Service Medal; Meritorious Service Medal (5); Army Commendation Medal (2)

Mark Hamilton Landes (born 19 May 1968) is a career officer in the United States Army who has commanded First United States Army since September 2024. A 1990 graduate of the United States Military Academy, and a veteran of the Iraq War, War in Afghanistan, and Operation Inherent Resolve, he was promoted to major general in 2021. Landes' commands included 2nd Battalion, 23rd Infantry Regiment, 3rd Brigade, 1st Armored Division, Security Force Assistance Command, and First Army Division East. In March 2024, Landes was appointed special assistant to the U.S. Army Forces Command commander. In June 2024, he was nominated for promotion to lieutenant general and assignment as commander of First United States Army. His promotion and assignment were confirmed in August 2024.

Landes' awards include the Legion of Merit with four oak leaf clusters, Bronze Star Medal with three oak leaf clusters, Defense Meritorious Service Medal, Meritorious Service Medal with four oak leaf clusters, and Army Commendation Medal with oak leaf cluster and "V" device for valor.

== Early life ==
Mark Hamilton Landes was born in Kingsport, Tennessee in May 1968, a son of Junior H. Landes II and Rebecca Linn (Davidson) Landes. He was raised and educated in Kingsport, and is a 1986 graduate of Dobyns-Bennett High School. While in high school, Landes played basketball, was a member of the cross-country and track and field teams, and was a member of the Key Club and National Honor Society.

In 1986, U.S. Representative Jimmy Quillen appointed Landes to the United States Military Academy at West Point, which he attended from 1986 to 1990. Landes graduated with a Bachelor of Science degree in computer science and was commissioned as a second lieutenant of Infantry.

== Career ==
=== Military education ===
Landes' military education includes:

- Infantry Officer Basic Course
- Infantry Officer Advanced Course
- United States Army Airborne School
- Ranger School
- United States Army Command and General Staff College
- United States Army War College fellowship at Yale University

In addition, Landes completed a Master of Business Administration degree at Tennessee Technological University.

=== Assignments ===
Landes' initial assignments included postings to Germany, Hawaii, and Dahlonega, Georgia. He served in one of the first units to employ the Stryker combat vehicle and helped validate the newly formed Stryker concept for combined arms fighting. He also served as an instructor at the Australian School of Infantry.

In 2007, Landes was assigned to command 2nd Battalion, 23rd Infantry Regiment, which he led during operations in the Diyala Governorate as part of the Iraq War troop surge of 2007. After completing his command tour, he was assigned to the Operations Group at the Fort Polk Joint Readiness Training Center. Following his promotion to colonel, he was appointed to command 3rd Brigade, 1st Armored Division. He led the brigade during its 2011 deployment to Afghanistan in support of Operation Enduring Freedom, including operations in the provinces of Logar, Wardak, and Bamyan provinces.

Landes served as executive officer to the Vice Chief of Staff of the United States Army from 2014 to 2016. After promotion to brigadier general, he served as 1st Armored Division's deputy commanding general for support. From July 2018 to July 2021, he served as commander of Security Force Assistance Command. He was commander of First Army Division East from August 2020 to December 2022, and he was promoted to major general in February 2021. In March 2024, Landes was appointed special assistant to the U.S. Army Forces Command commander.

In June 2024, Landes was nominated for promotion to lieutenant general and appointment as commanding general of the First United States Army. The promotion and assignment were effective in August, and he officially assumed command in a ceremony held on 6 September 2024.

== Awards ==
Landes' awards and decorations include:

- Legion of Merit with four oak leaf clusters
- Bronze Star Medal with three oak leaf clusters
- Defense Meritorious Service Medal
- Meritorious Service Medal with four oak leaf clusters
- Army Commendation Medal with oak leaf cluster and "V" device for valor
- Joint Service Achievement Medal
- Army Achievement Medal with four oak leaf clusters

In addition, Landes is a recipient of the Combat Infantryman Badge, Expert Infantryman Badge, Senior Parachutist Badge, Ranger Tab, and Army Staff Identification Badge.

Military offices
New office	Commanding General of the Security Force Assistance Command; 2018–2020	Succeeded by Scott A. Jackson
Preceded by Terrence J. McKenrick	Commanding General of First Army Division East; 2020–2023	Succeeded by Brian M. Howay
Preceded by Antonio Aguto	Commanding General of the First United States Army; Acting; 2023–2024	Succeeded by William A. Ryan III; Acting
Preceded by William A. Ryan III; Acting	Commander of the First United States Army; 2024–present	Incumbent
