= 4th Security Force Assistance Brigade =

- Distinctive unit insignia
- Active: 28 April 2020 - 2026
- Country: United States of America
- Branch: United States Army
- Type: Security Force Assistance Brigade
- Role: Train and advise foreign militaries Security force assistance
- Size: 800 troops
- Garrison/HQ: Fort Carson, Colorado
- Color of Beret: Brown

Commanders
- Current commander: Col. Johnny Casiano
- Command Sgt. Maj.: CSM Herbert B. Gill

Insignia
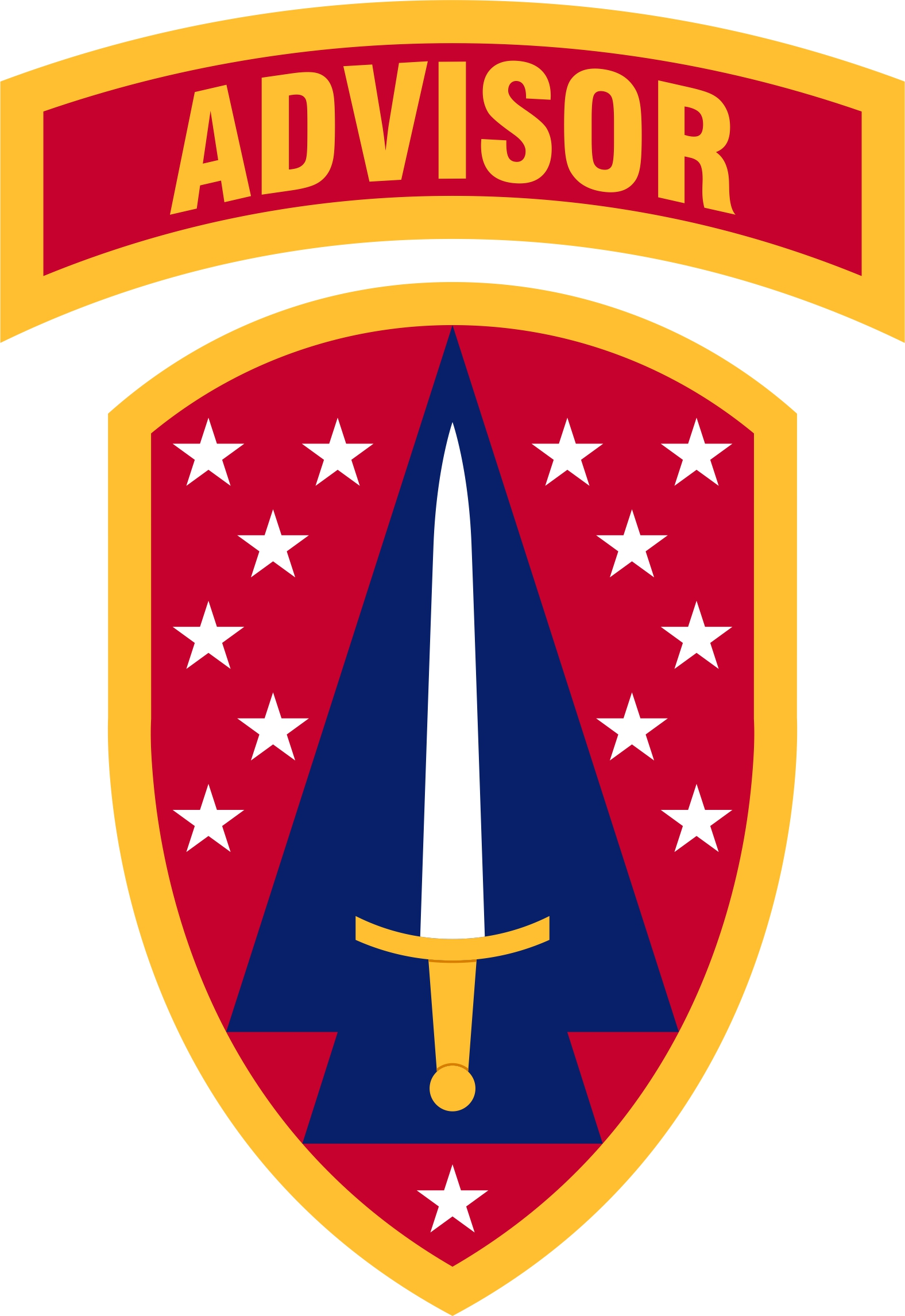
- Shoulder sleeve insignia

- Beret flash

The 4th Security Force Assistance Brigade (4th SFAB) was a Security Force Assistance Brigade of the United States Army. It was based at Fort Carson, Colorado, under the Security Force Assistance Command. 4th SFAB was aligned with EUCOM.

== Formation ==
The 4th Brigade was established on 29 April 2020.

According to the United States Army, Security Force Assistance Brigades are the dedicated conventional organisations for conducting security force assistance around the world. Each brigade will have a regional focus and its capabilities would enable it to perform with minimal cultural and regional orientation.

== Composition ==
Each Security Force Assistance Brigade consists of about 800 senior and non-commissioned officers.

As of 23 Sep 2022 4th SFAB was composed of "2 infantry battalions, 1 cavalry squadron, an artillery battalion, an engineer battalion, and a logistics battalion". 4th SFAB had up to 20 Advisor Teams at EUCOM, but the total fluctuates as teams roll on and off their missions; at any given time one third of the SFAB is resetting, one third is in unit training, and one third is on-mission at EUCOM.
