= 54th Security Force Assistance Brigade =

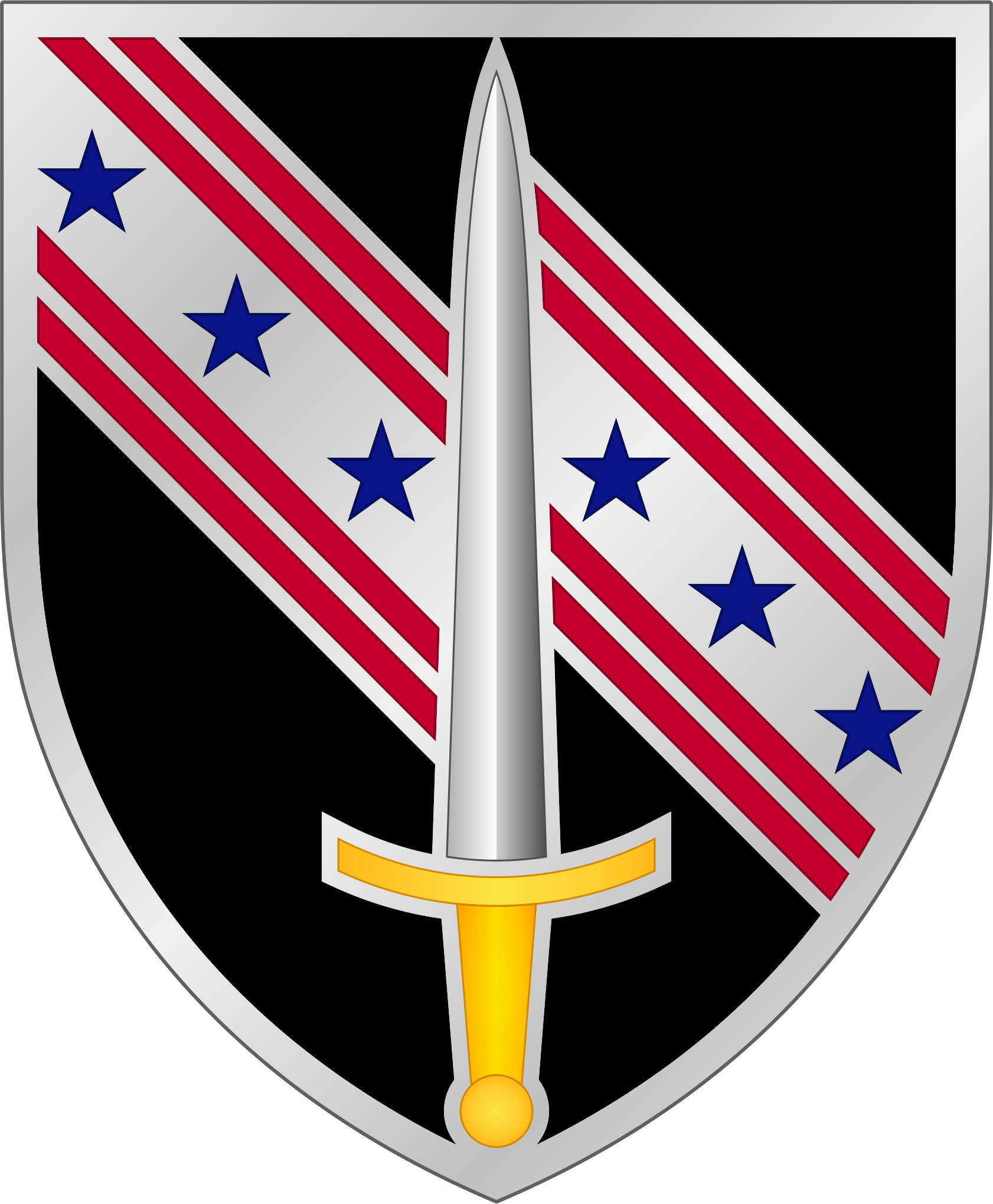
- Distinctive unit insignia
- Active: 28 April 2020—20 November 2026
- Country: United States of America
- Branch: Army National Guard
- Type: Security Force Assistance Brigade
- Role: Train and advise foreign militaries
- Size: 800 troops
- Color of Beret: Brown

Commanders
- Current commander: Col. Mark O’Neill
- Command Sgt. Maj.: CSM John W. Hoffman

Insignia
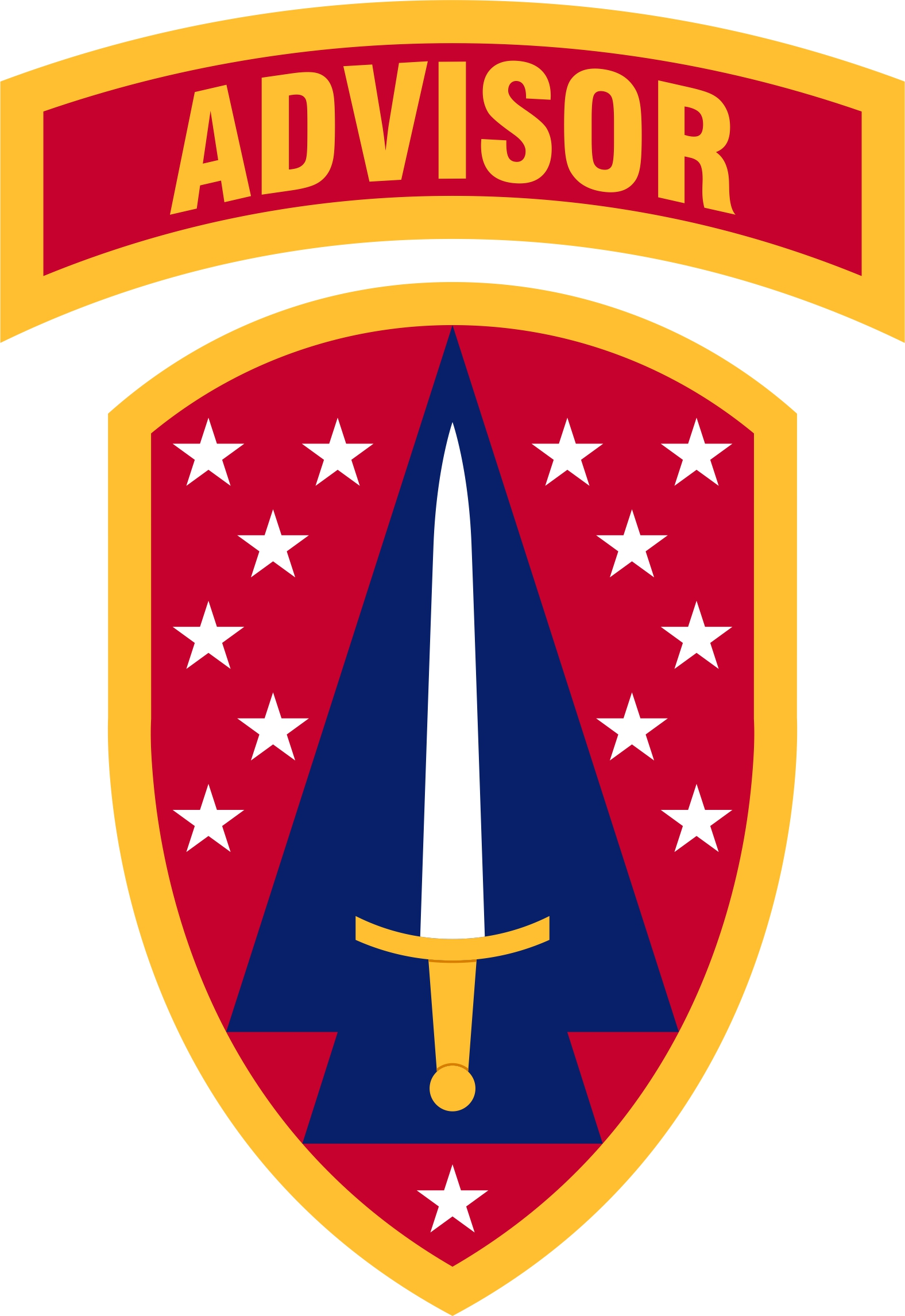
- Shoulder sleeve insignia

- Beret flash

The 54th Security Force Assistance Brigade (54th SFAB) is a Security Force Assistance Brigade of the United States Army. It is an Army National Guard formation headquartered out of Indiana and falls under the Regular Army's Security Force Assistance Command.

After 2017, Security Force Assistance Brigades became the dedicated conventional formations for conducting U.S. Army security force assistance overseas. EAch brigade was envisaged to be able to perform with minimal cultural and regional orientation.

Per the brigade's official Facebook page, the unit will case its colors (deactivate) on 20 November 2026, freeing up seasoned soldiers for duty in traditional line units, leaving the Army with four operational SFABs.

== Formation ==
The 54th Brigade was established in March 2020. Power, mission command and tactical radio equipment for the 1st, 2nd and 54th SFABs’ M1151 High Mobility Multi-purposed Wheeled Vehicles (HMMWVs) were upgraded to SFAB priorities.

== Organization ==
Each Security Force Assistance Brigade consists of about 800 senior and noncommissioned officers. The 54th SFAB consists of six battalions and a headquarters company spread throughout six states.

- Headquarters and Headquarters Company, at Stout Field Armory in Indianapolis,Indiana (Indiana Army National Guard)
- 1st Battalion (Infantry), at Columbus Armory in Columbus,Georgia (Georgia Army National Guard)
- 2nd Battalion (Infantry), in Pinellas Park,Florida (Florida Army National Guard)
- 3rd Battalion (Cavalry), in Gainesville,Florida (Florida Army National Guard)
- 4th Battalion (Field Artillery), at Dallas Red Bird Readiness Center in Dallas,Texas (Texas Army National Guard)
- 5th Battalion (Engineer), at Defense Supply Center Columbus in Columbus,Ohio (Ohio Army National Guard)
- 6th Battalion (Support), at Rock Island Arsenal in Rock Island,Illinois (Illinois Army National Guard)

== See also ==
- Security Force Assistance Brigade
