= 5th Security Force Assistance Brigade =

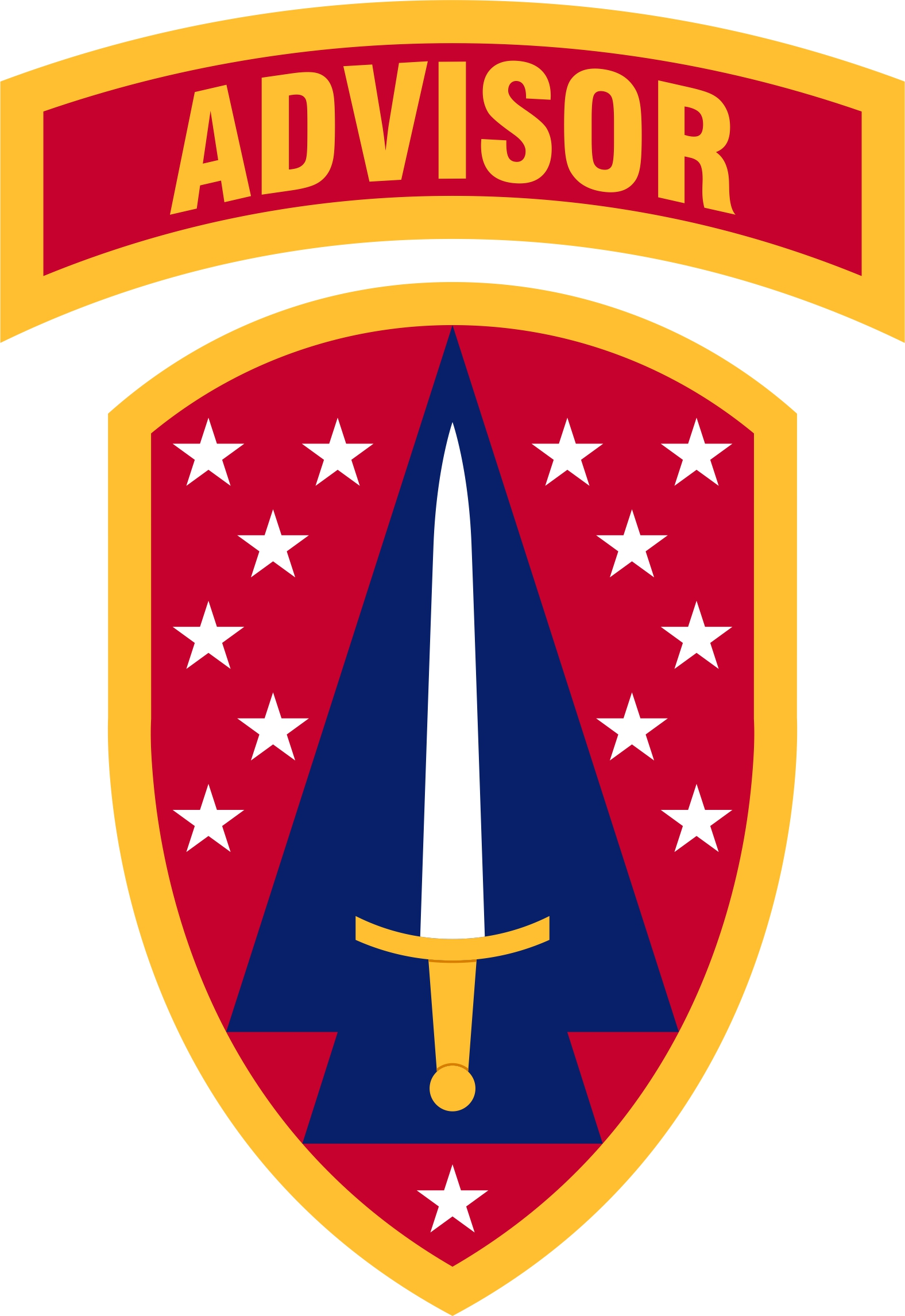
- The SFAB's shoulder sleeve insignia
- Founded: June 2019–present
- Country: United States of America
- Branch: United States Army
- Type: Military education and training
- Role: Train and advise foreign militaries Security force assistance
- Garrison/HQ: Joint Base Lewis-McChord, Washington, U.S.
- Color of berets: Brown

Commanders
- Current commander: Col. Brandon Teague
- Command Sergeant Major: Charles D. Smith

Insignia
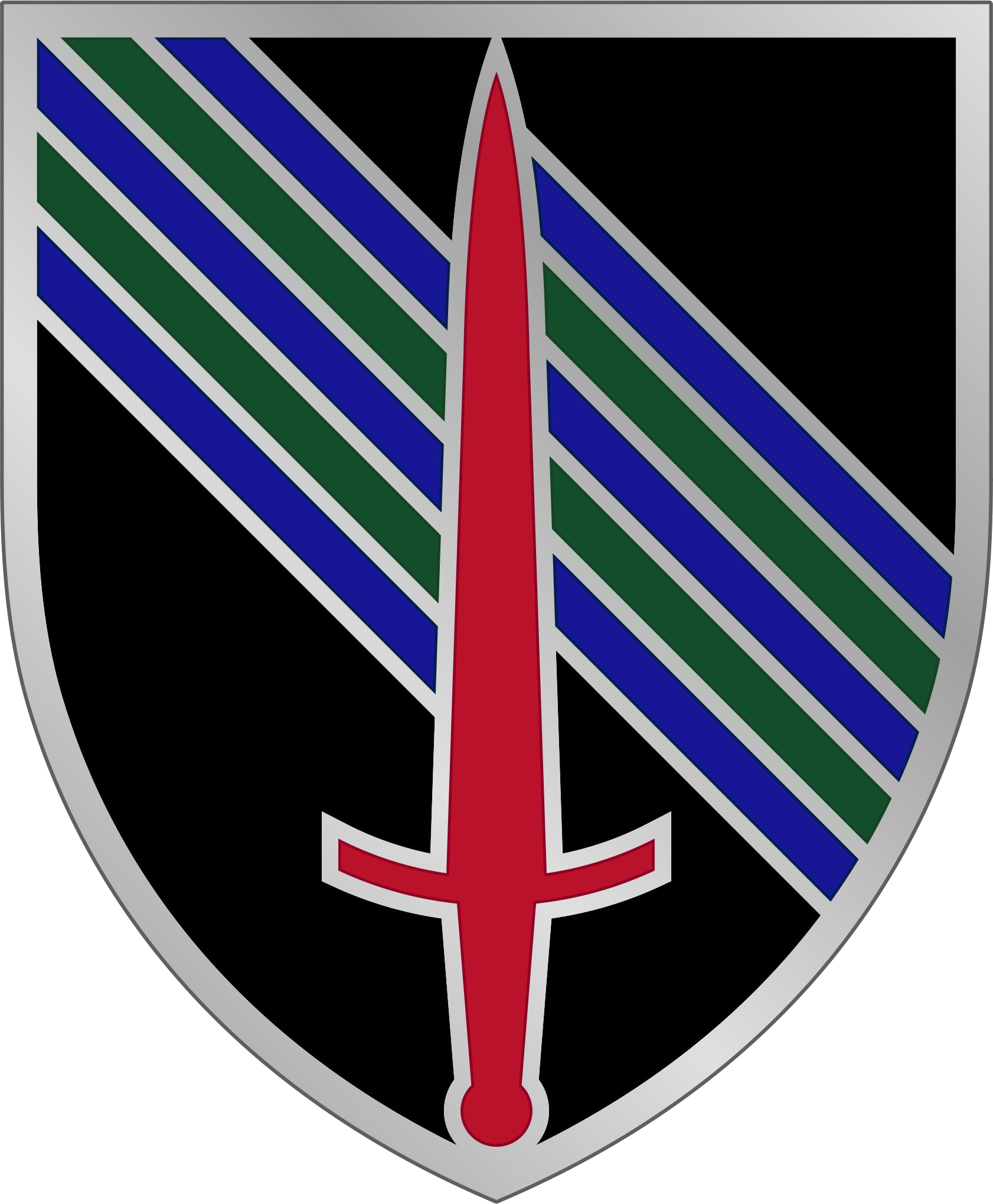
- Distinctive unit insignia

- Beret flash

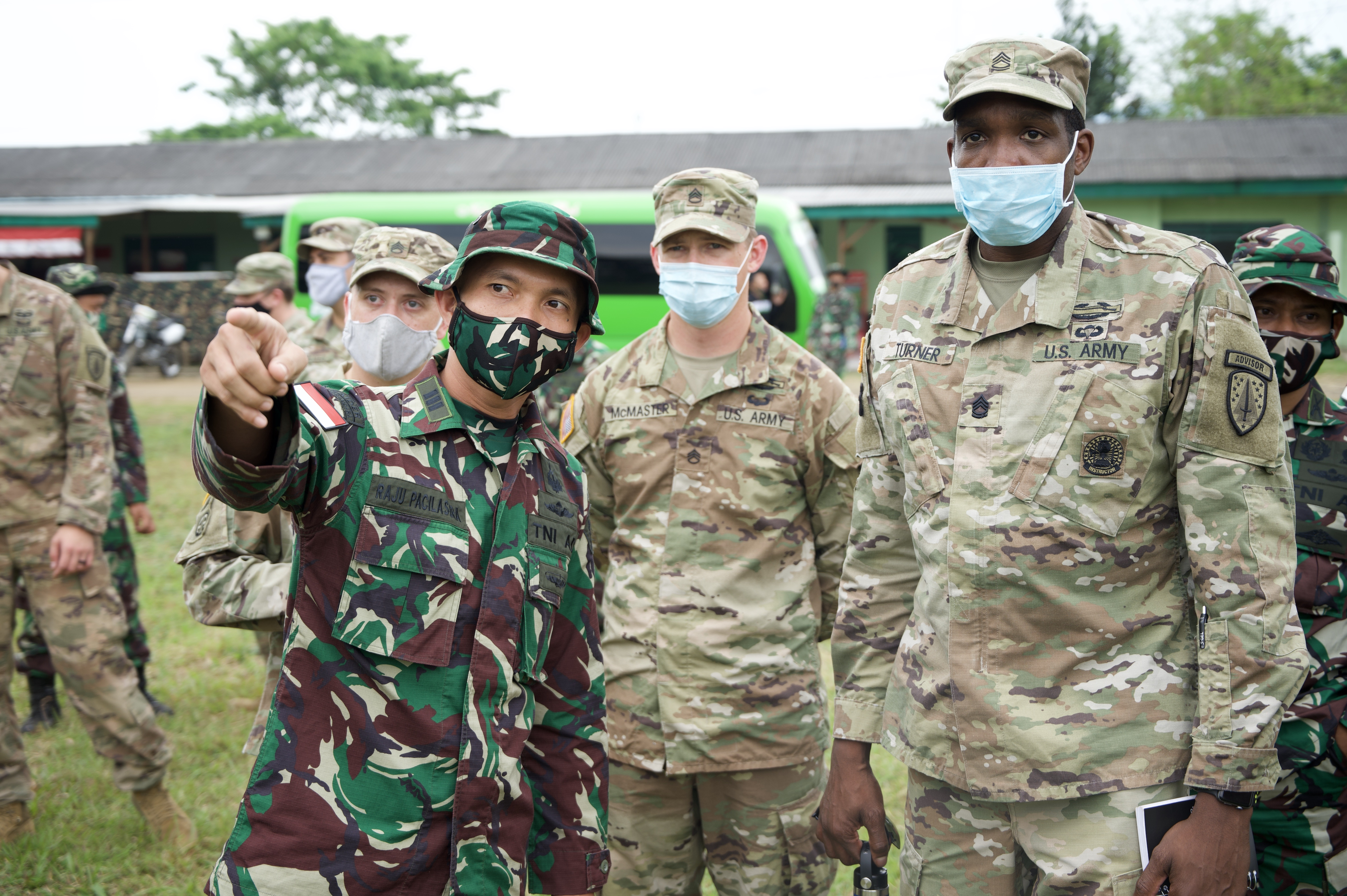
Sgt. 1st. Class Dajuan Turner, Assistant Team Leader for Maneuver Advisor Team 5213, walks a training course with his Tentara Nasional Indonesia-Angkatan Darat (Indonesian Army) counterparts while training in Indonesia, Sept. 7, 2020.

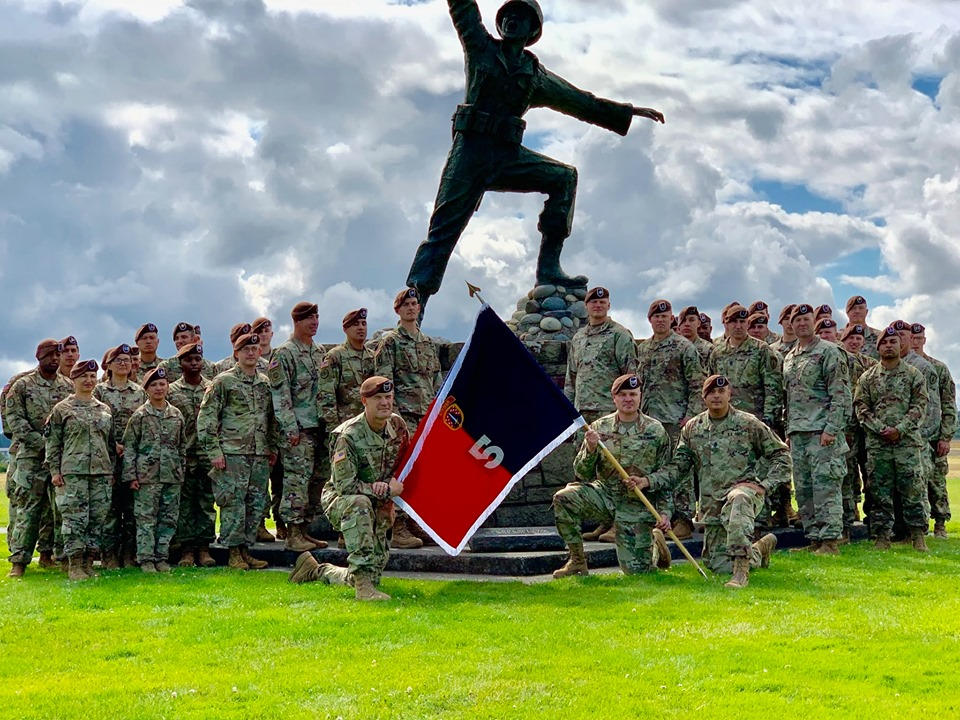
The men and women of 5th SFAB donned their brown berets for the first time in a ceremony at JBLM's Iron Mike statue, circa July 2019

5th Security Force Assistance Brigade (5th SFAB) is a security force assistance brigade in the United States Army based at Joint Base Lewis-McChord, Washington. The unit (Vanguard Brigade) stood-up on June 16, 2019, and officially activated May 28, 2020. During the activation, Gen. Michael Garrett, Commanding General, U.S. Army Forces Command, announced that the 5th SFAB would align with the U.S. Indo-Pacific Command. The unit completed missions to Thailand and Indonesia during the Summer of 2020, strengthening relationships between the U.S. and each respective country and setting the stage for future engagements and training. Following the completion of a Decisive Action Rotation with 1-2 Stryker Brigade Combat Team at the Joint Readiness Training Center, Fort Polk, Louisiana in November 2020, the Brigade was certified for world-wide employment in 2021. On December 17, 2020, the U.S. Army announced that Advisor teams from the 5th SFAB would deploy to the Indo-Pacific region during the winter of 2020–2021 to support the United States' commitment to allies and partners in the region.

5th SFAB is a completely voluntary organization and volunteers typically serve a two to three-year tour in the organization before returning to lead tactical formations in the conventional force. While assigned to 5th SFAB, Advisors are required to attend a 54-day Combat Advisor Training Course at Fort Benning, GA and are afforded the opportunity to attend other career-enhancing schools that promote the Advisor mission. Graduates will have the requisite knowledge, skills, and attributes critical to the successful execution of Security Force Assistance (SFA) tasks. The eleven advisor attributes are disciplined, mature, sound judgment, initiative, cool under pressure, tolerance for ambiguity, open-minded, empathetic, situationally aware, patient, and morally straight.

== National Defense Strategy ==
The 2018 National Defense Strategy (NDS) describes a need for the United States to transition from counter-insurgency to long-term strategic competition against powerful adversaries with near-peer capabilities. To achieve this transition, the strategy directs military forces to “expand the competitive space” and “strengthen alliances and attract new partners.” Security Force Assistance Brigades are specifically designed and organized to achieve these two critical mandates in the NDS. Composed of 820 specially selected officers and non-commissioned officers who must undergo a rigorous screening process, the SFAB is equipped to operate in small teams in conflicted areas around the world. The SFAB's mission is to train and advise conventional military forces in order to build long lasting trust among like-minded professional military forces and to establish the United States in regions of the world that are vital to US strategy.

=== Starshield ===
The brigade received four Starshield systems on 1 October 2023, for use in United States Indo-Pacific Command's Joint Pacific Multinational Readiness Center (JPMRC). These systems are satellite-enabled, and provide communications services suitable for the distances required to cover the Pacific.

== 5th SFAB organizational structure ==
5th SFAB is organized like a traditional Brigade Combat Team with 2 Infantry Battalions, 1 Cavalry Squadron, and a Fires, Engineer, and Logistics Battalion. These six battalions and the brigade staff are organized into 61 separate advisor teams that range in size from four to twelve personnel and are generally led by a post-command Captain and a Sergeant First Class. Teams are organized to provide infantry, cavalry, artillery, engineer, or logistics training and support. With this broad spectrum of conventional capabilities, 5th SFAB is able to provide graduate-level training and advisory support to the most advanced military partners in the world. Advisors are selected into the Brigade at all levels from Corporal to Colonel based on their expertise in the conduct of large scale combat operations (LSCO) at the squad to division level. Advisors also must demonstrate a high level of physical fitness, stamina under pressure, and the ability to work well in small teams with limited guidance and contact with a higher headquarters.
