= Army Security Cooperation Group–South =

Army Security Cooperation Group – South
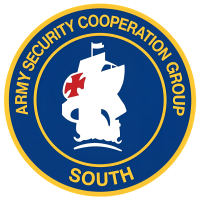
- Founded: 2017—2025 1st SFAB; 2026—present ASCG-S
- Country: United States of America
- Branch: United States Army
- Type: Military education and training
- Role: Jungle Warfare Experts and Trainers
- Part of: United States Army Western Hemisphere Command
- Garrison/HQ: Fort Benning, Georgia, U.S.

Commanders
- Current commander: Col. Keith Benedict
- Command Sgt. Maj.: Command Sgt. Maj. Pedro Chavez

Insignia
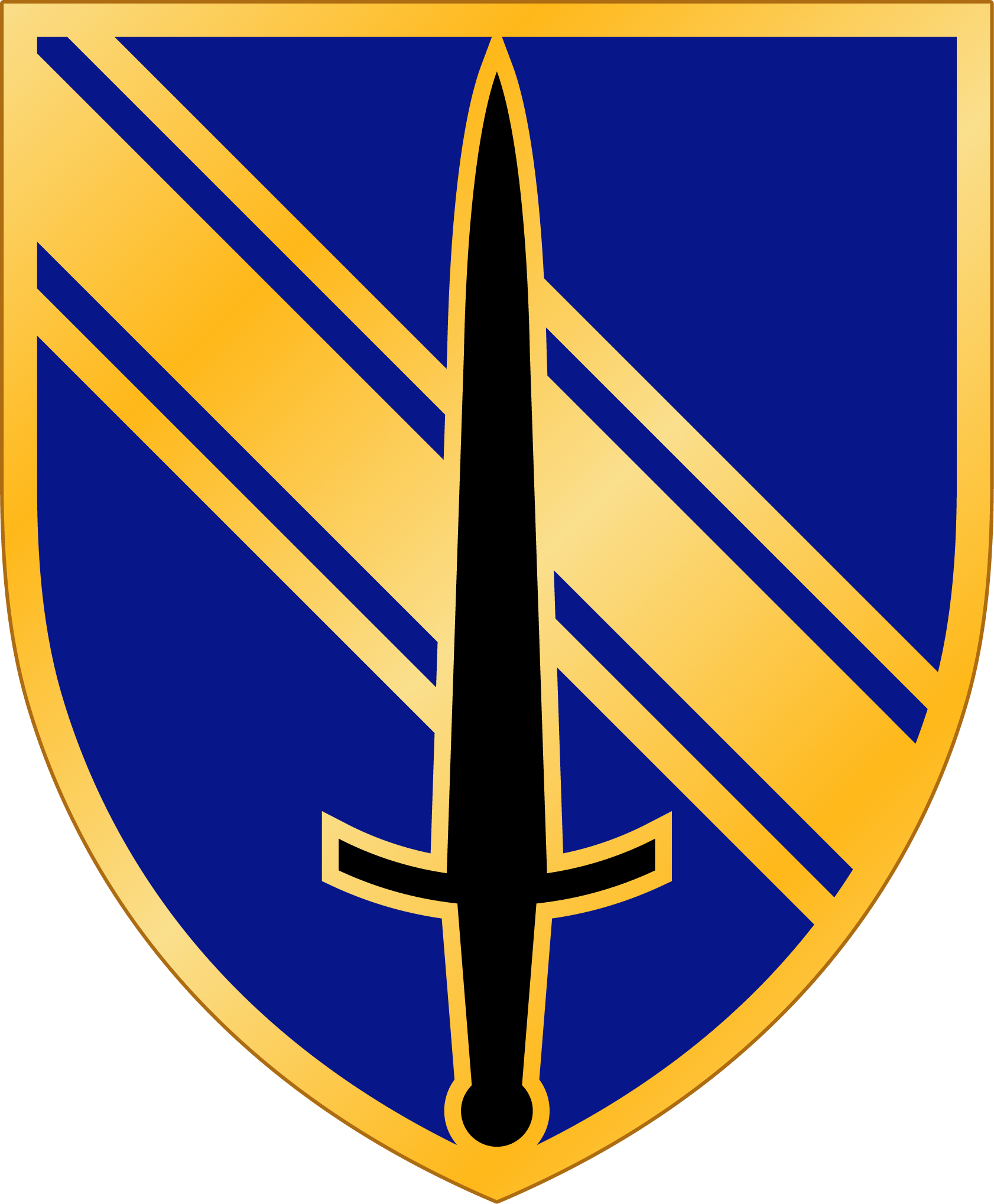
- Distinctive unit insignia

- Former beret flash

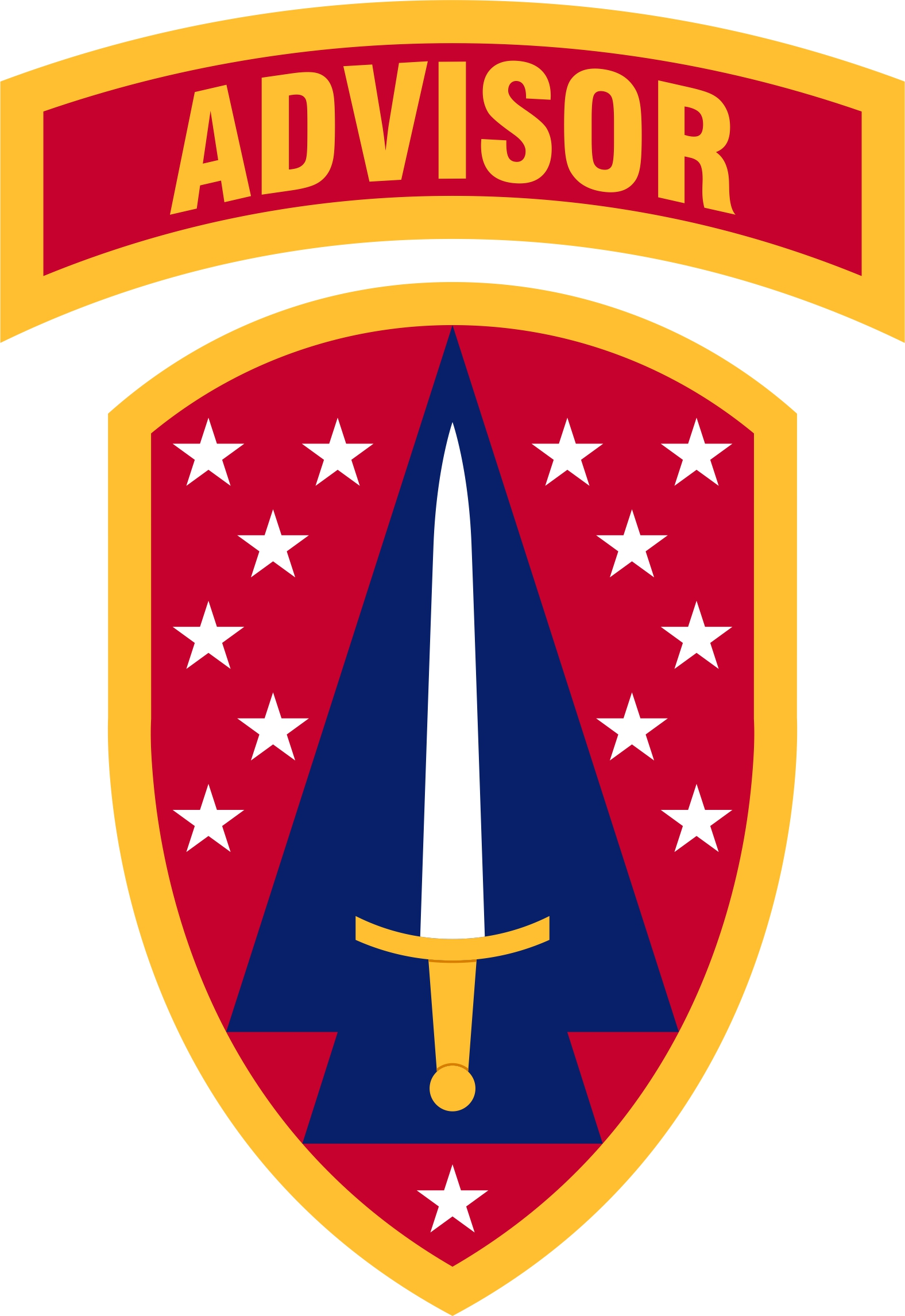
- Former shoulder sleeve insignia 2017-2026

The Army Security Cooperation Group–South (ASCG-S) is the U.S. Army unit that oversees all security cooperation efforts in South and Central America as well as Joint Security Cooperation Group - Panama and Jungle Operations Training Center - Panama. The ASCG-S was stood out January 27, 2026 on Kelley Hill, Fort Benning, Georgia. It is under the command of Colonel Keith Benedict and Command Sergeant Major Pedro Chavez.

Previously, the unit was the 1st Security Force Assistance Brigade (1st SFAB), a security force assistance brigade of the United States Army. It was based at Kelley Hill in Fort Benning, Georgia. On February 8, 2018, the 1st SFAB held its official activation ceremony at the National Infantry Museum at Fort Benning.

== Organization ==
The ASCG-S mission is to support security cooperation efforts within the U.S. Southern Command (SOUTHCOM) Area of Operation, acts as the lead agent for Joint Reception, Staging, Onward Movement and integration of all U.S. Military personnel transiting Panama, and revitalize a joint/combined Jungle Operations Training Center - Panama (JOTC-P).

ASCG-S fall under the newly established U.S. Army Western Hemisphere Command (USAWHC) that is stationed out of Fort Bragg, North Carolina.

On January 27, 2026 the ASCG-S took command of both the Joint Security Cooperation Group-Panama (JSCG-P) and the Combined Jungle Operations Training Center (CJOTC). The Army is looking to revitalize the jungle warfare course at Aeronaval Base Cristobal Colon with their partners in Panama. Currently the course is 18 days long with a focus on fire and shelter building, tracking and patrol based exercises. In February 2026, the first group of soldiers to participate in the Panama course since 1999. Soldiers who complete the course will receive the Jungle Warfare Tab.

== History ==
On 23 June 2016, General Mark A. Milley revealed plans for train/advise/assist brigades, consisting of seasoned Commissioned Officers, Warrant Officers and Non-commissioned Officers with a full chain of command, but no junior soldiers. The SFABs were to consist of 800 senior officers and NCOs, as a cadre to reform a full brigade combat team in a matter of months. In May 2017, initial SFAB staffing was underway. The volunteer Officers, Warrant Officers and non-commissioned officers have previous experience in the same positions. Commanders and leaders have previously led at the same echelon. The remaining personnel, all NCOs, are being recruited from across the Army. Promotable E-4s (Specialists and Corporals) who volunteer for the SFAB are automatically promoted to Sergeant upon completion of the Combat Advisor Training Course at the Military Advisor Training Academy on Kelley Hill. In the event of a national emergency, SFABs could be augmented with new Soldiers from basic training and advanced individual training to form a full brigade combat team.

On 16 October 2017, BG Brian Mennes of Force Management in the Army's G3/5/7 announced accelerated deployment of the first two SFABs. This was approved in early July 2017, by the Secretary of Defense and the Chief of Staff of the Army. These two SFABs would be trained in languages, how to work with interpreters, and equipped with the latest equipment including secure, but unclassified, communications and weapons to support coalition partners, as well as unmanned aircraft systems (UASs). An SFAB could provide up to 61 teams (possibly with additional soldiers for force protection).

A team of twelve advisors includes combat arms experts, a medic, and personnel specializing in military intelligence, logistics, maintenance, communications, and air support.

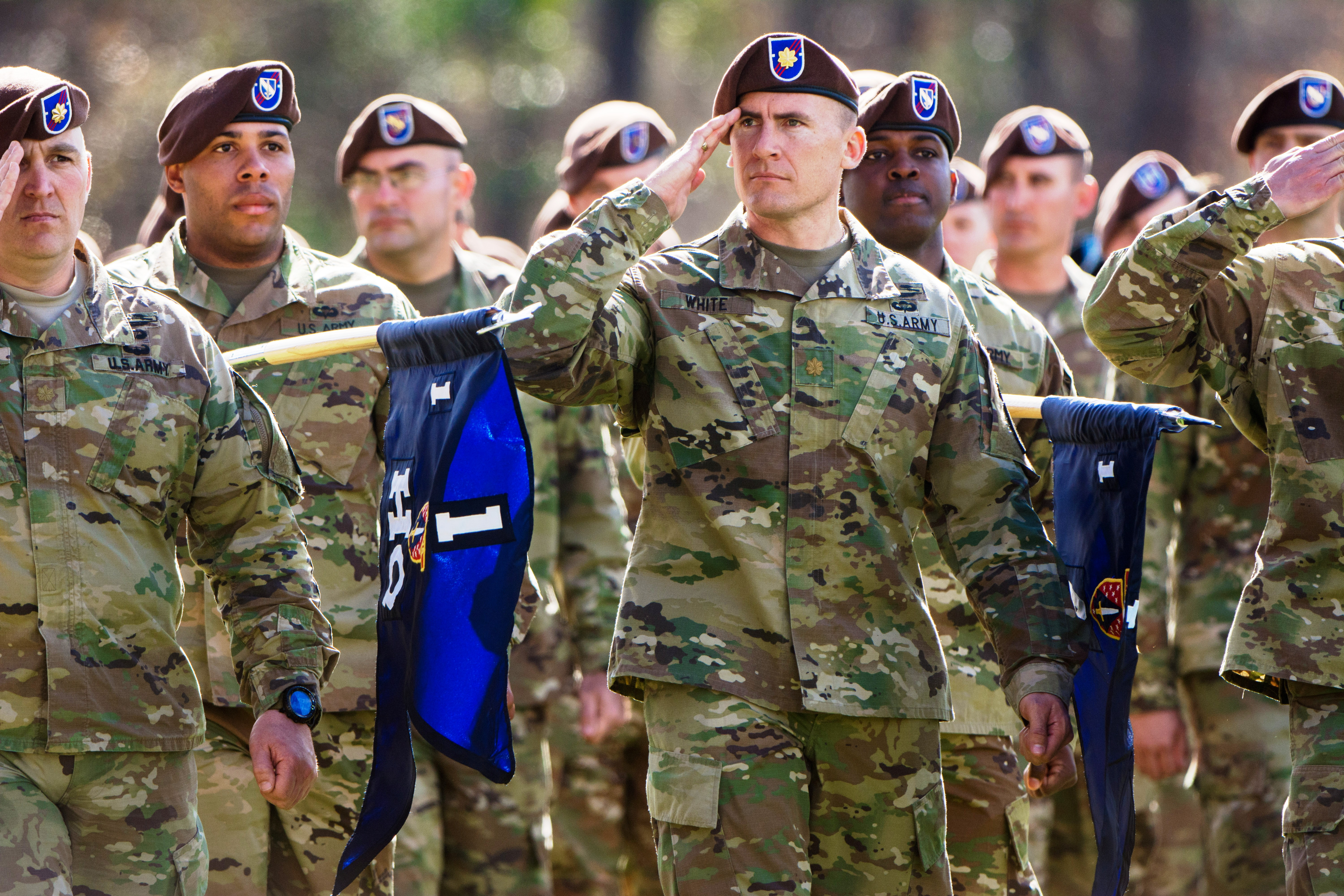
1st SFAB activation ceremony

By October 2017, the 1st Security Force Assistance Brigade was established at Fort Benning.

On January 11, 2018, it was announced that the 1st SFAB would deploy to Afghanistan in Spring 2018.

On 8 February 2018, 1st SFAB held an activation ceremony at Fort Benning, revealing its colors and heraldry for the first time, and then cased its colors for the deployment to Afghanistan. It is made up of the first graduates of the Military Advisor Training Academy (MATA), also located at Fort Benning.

1st SFAB deployed to Afghanistan in February 2018 and returned to Fort Benning in November of the same year.

On 7 July 2018, Corporal Joseph Maciel, Task Force 1st Battalion, 28th Infantry Regiment, attached to 2nd Battalion 1st SFAB, was killed in an apparent insider attack in Uruzgan Province, Afghanistan. On 3 September 2018, 3rd Squadron, 1st SFAB Command Sgt. Maj. Timothy Bolyard was killed in an apparent insider attack while visiting the Afghan army's 4th Brigade, 203rd Corps.

The 1st SFAB conducted hundreds of persistent advising missions, and facilitated operations with thirty plus Afghan National Army Kandaks (Afghan battalions), 15+ Brigades, Regional Training Centers, and Afghan divisional and corps headquarters.

Six engineering advisor teams from the brigade provided hands-on experience and testing of secure communications between NATO allies and partners during Exercise "Allied Spirit X", led by the German 1st Panzer Division, in April 2019.

In Summer 2019 Combat Advisor Teams 1221 and 1222 became the first SFAB elements to participate in the United States Military Academy's Cadet Field Training, a four-week-long program which includes a six day field training exercise.

On January 27, 2026 the 1st Security Force Assistance Brigade was deactivated and it became the Army Security Cooperation Group–South (ASCG-S) in a repatching ceremony. ASCG-S has assumed the missions of the Joint Security Cooperation Group-Panama (JSCG-P) and the Combined Jungle Operations Training Center (CJOTC). The jungle training center is being used by both U.S. Army soldiers, Marines and U.S. Air Force security forces in partnership with Panamanian forces.

== See also ==
- Military Assistance Advisory Group
