= Fort Carson =

US Army post in Colorado, United States

- El Paso, Pueblo, Fremont, and Huerfano counties near Colorado Springs, Colorado
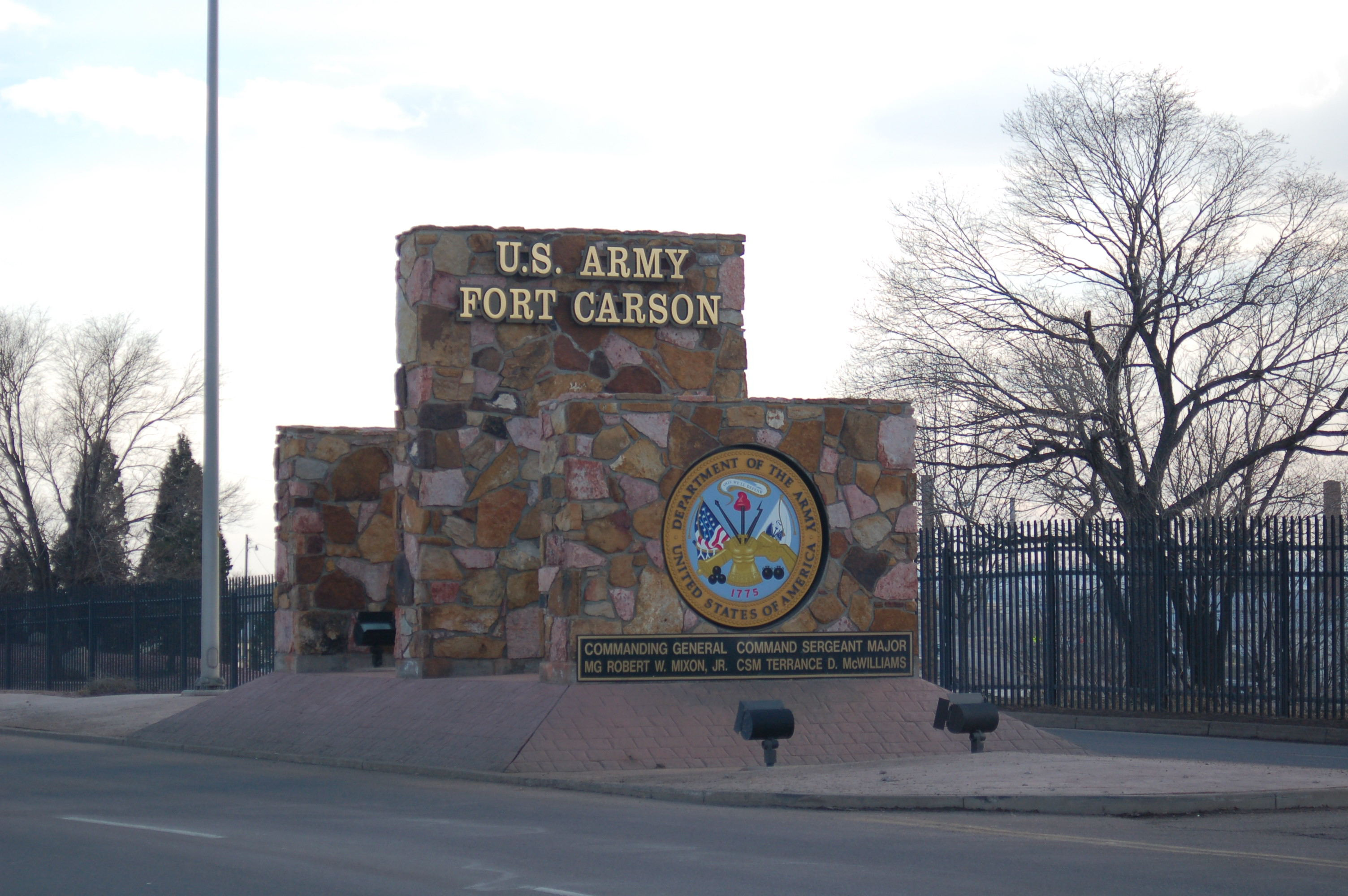
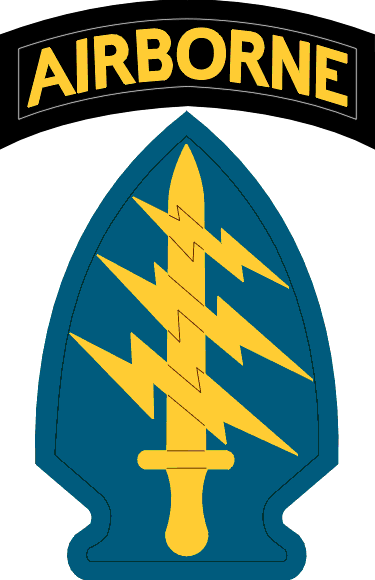
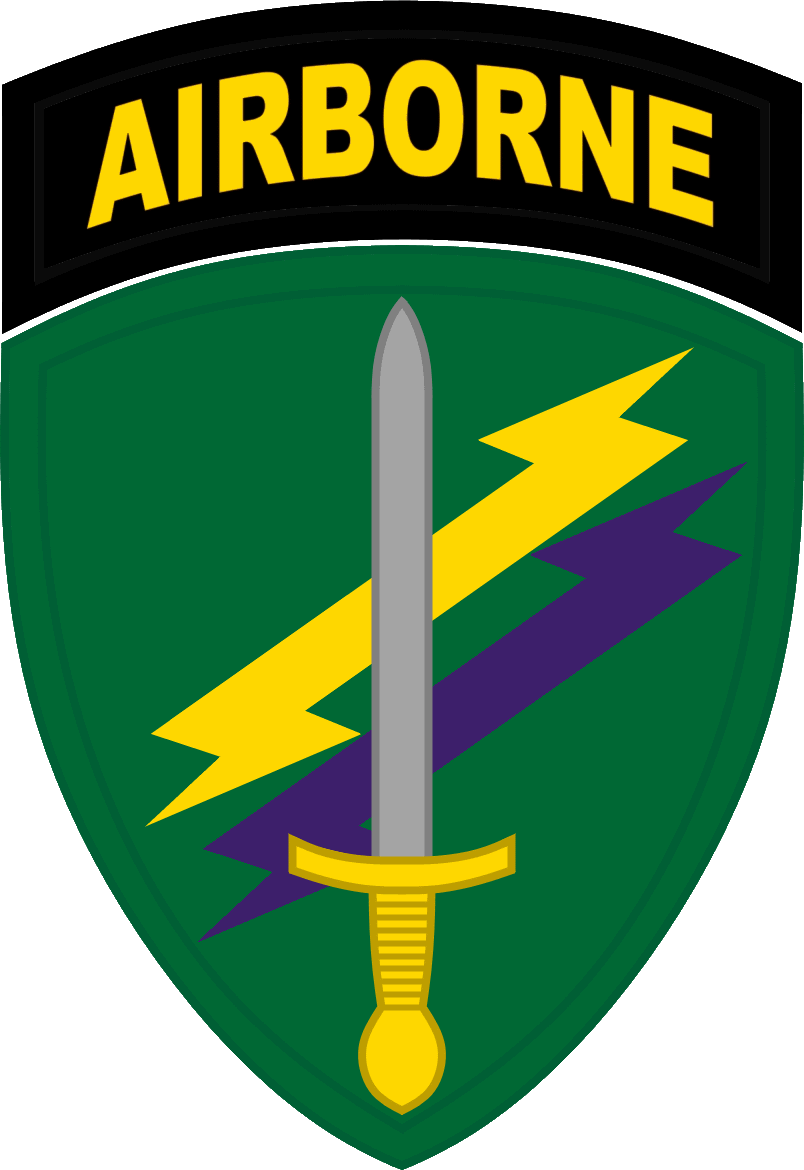
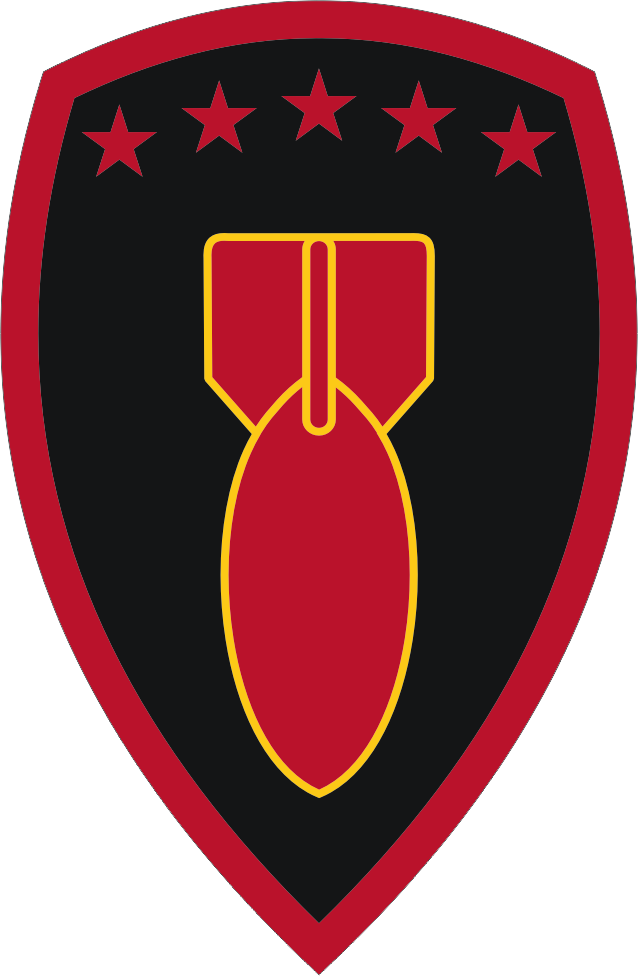
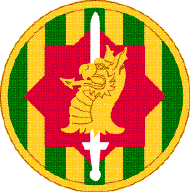
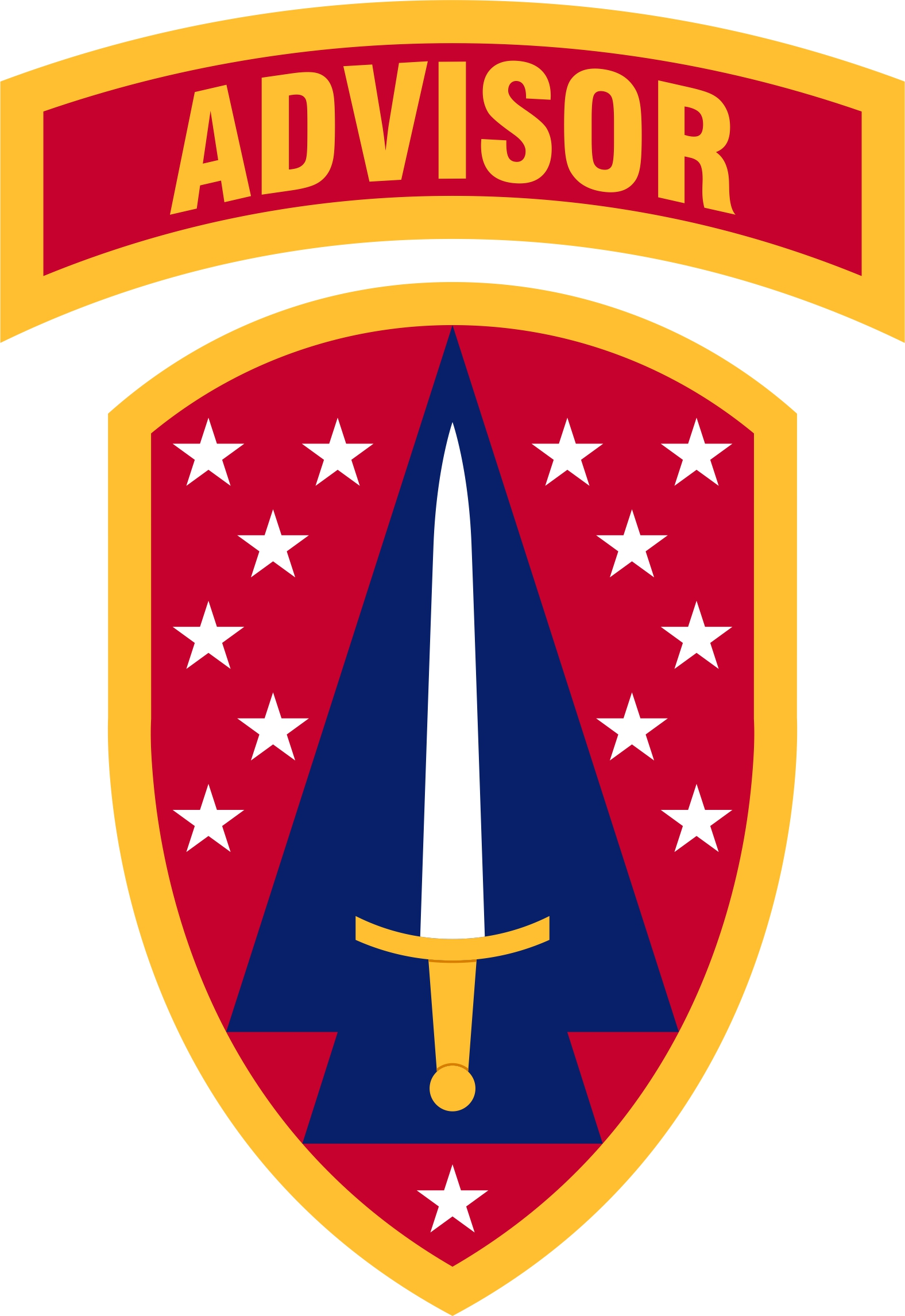
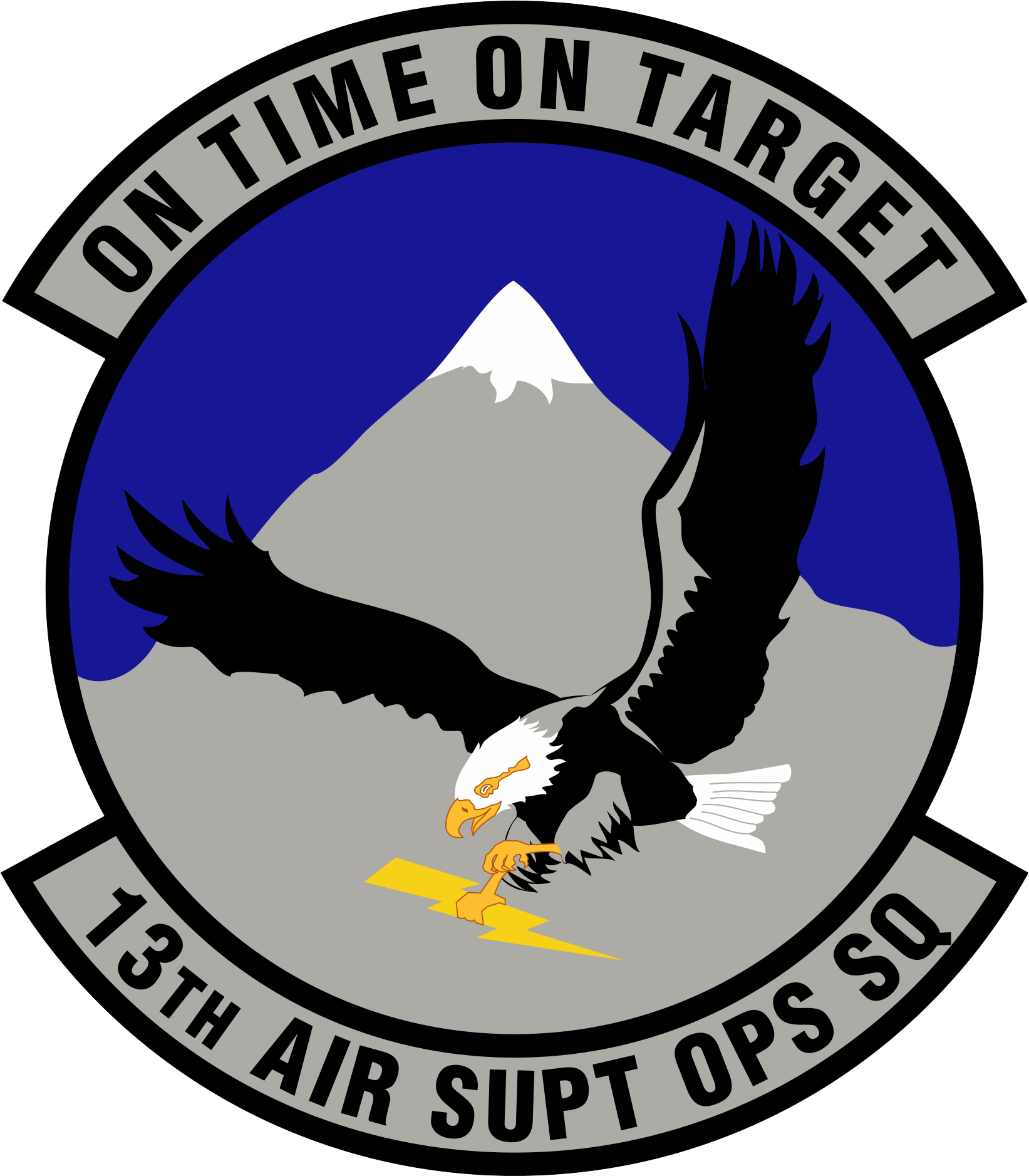
- One of the entrance signs at Fort Carson. Shoulder sleeve insignia of units stationed at Fort Carson.

Site information
- Type: U.S. Army post
- Controlled by: United States Army

Site history
- Built: January 31, 1942
- In use: 1942–present

Garrison information
- Garrison: 4th Infantry Division; 10th Special Forces Group; 4th Security Force Assistance Brigade

Fort Carson is a United States Army post located directly south of Colorado Springs in El Paso, Pueblo, Fremont, and Huerfano counties, Colorado, United States. The developed portion of Fort Carson is located near the City of Colorado Springs in El Paso County.

Fort Carson is the home of the 4th Infantry Division, the 10th Special Forces Group, the 4th Security Force Assistance Brigade (SFAB), the 440th Civil Affairs Battalion (USAR), the 71st Ordnance Group (EOD), the 4th Engineer Battalion, the 759th Military Police Battalion, the 10th Combat Support Hospital, the 43rd Sustainment Brigade, the Army Field Support Battalion-Fort Carson, the 423rd Transportation Company (USAR) and the 13th Air Support Operations Squadron of the United States Air Force. The post also hosts units of the Army Reserve, Navy Reserve and the Colorado Army National Guard. Fort Carson was also home to the 5th Infantry Division, known as the Red Devils.

== History ==
=== Camp Carson ===
Camp Carson was established in 1942, following Japan's attack on Pearl Harbor. The city of Colorado Springs, Colorado purchased land south of the city and donated it to the War Department. Construction began immediately and the first building, the camp headquarters, was completed on January 31, 1942. Camp Carson was named in honor of the legendary Army scout, General Christopher "Kit" Carson, who explored much of the West in the 1800s.

At the construction's peak, nearly 11,500 workers were employed on various construction projects at the new camp. Facilities were provided for 35,173 enlisted men, 1,818 officers, and 592 nurses. Almost all of the buildings were of mobilization-type construction, with wood-sided exteriors. The hospital complex was constructed of concrete block, considered semi-permanent, and had space for 1,726 beds, expandable to 2,000 beds.

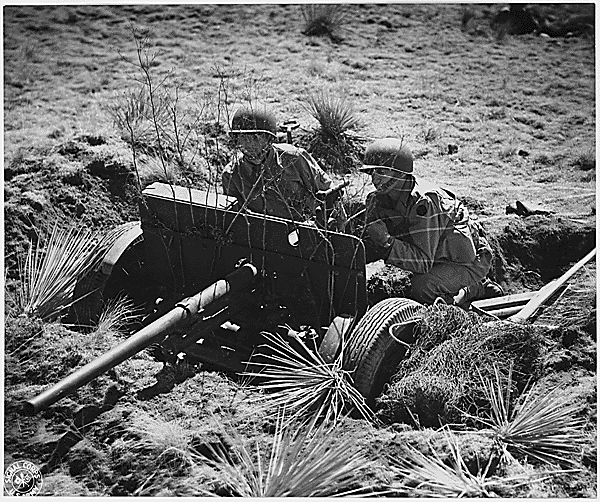
Training on a 37mm anti-tank gun at Camp Carson.

The 89th Infantry Division was the first major unit to be activated at Camp Carson. During World War II, over 100,000 soldiers trained at Camp Carson. Along with three other infantry divisions – the 71st Infantry Division, 104th Infantry Division and 10th Mountain Division – more than 125 units were activated at Camp Carson and more than 100 others were transferred to the mountain post from other installations.

Nurses, cooks, mule packers, tank battalions, a Greek infantry battalion, and an Italian ordnance company trained at Camp Carson during the war years. Camp Carson was also home to nearly 9,000 Axis prisoners of war – mostly Italians and Germans. The internment camp at Camp Carson opened on the first day of 1943. These POWs alleviated the manpower shortage in Colorado by doing general farm work, canning tomatoes, cutting corn, and aiding in logging operations on Colorado's Western Slope.

Between 1942 and 1956, pack mules were a common sight at Camp Carson. The first shipment arrived by train from Nebraska in July 1942. The mules were used by Field Artillery (Pack) battalions to carry equipment, weapons, and supplies over mountainous terrain. The most famous of these animals was Hambone, the pride of the 4th Field Artillery Battalion. For 13 years, he carried the first sergeants up Ute Pass to Camp Hale. Camp Hale, located near Leadville, Colorado, was where the Army conducted cold weather and mountain warfare training. Hambone died in March 1971 and was buried with full military honors.

By April 1946, the post-war military strength at the camp was around 600 and on 16 December 1949, Strategic Air Command opened a survival school at Camp Carson for training in mountainous terrain (moved to Stead Air Force Base, Nevada, in 1952.)

=== Designated Fort Carson ===
Camp Carson was designated Fort Carson in 1954. In the 1960s, mechanized units were assigned to the fort and it was expanded to the present 137,000 acres (55,000 ha). Butts Army Air Field at the fort was constructed between 1963 and 1966 with a 4,573-foot (1,394 m) runway for light fixed-wing aircraft (cf. USAF C-130s at the nearby Peterson Air Force Base.)

Throughout its history Fort Carson has been home to nine divisions. An additional training area, comprising 235,000 acres (95,000 hectares), was purchased in September 1983. Named the Piñon Canyon Maneuver Site, this training area is located approximately 150 miles (240 km) road miles to the southeast, and is used for large force-on-force maneuver training. Comprehensive maneuver and live fire training also occurs downrange at Fort Carson.

Exercises and deployments continually hone the skills of Fort Carson soldiers. When not deployed, soldiers train annually at Piñon Canyon Maneuver Site and the National Training Center near Barstow, California. Additionally, units participate in joint exercises around the world, including Central and South Africa, Europe, and Southwest Asia. In 2003, most Fort Carson units were deployed in support of Operations Enduring Freedom and Iraqi Freedom. Troops from the 984th Military Police CO, 759th Military Police BN were also sent in support of the guard mission at Guantanamo Bay Naval Base, Cuba. President George W. Bush addressed soldiers and family members at the post on November 24, 2003, in praise of the soldiers' determination and the sacrifices their families have made.

Construction in 2007 and 2008 preceded the return of the 4th Infantry Division (4ID) from Fort Hood after their 2008 Operation Iraqi Freedom deployment (~5,000 additional soldiers).

=== Controversy ===
On February 14, 2007, the U.S. Army announced it was moving forward with a plan to expand the Piñon Canyon Maneuver Site in southeastern Colorado. If expanded, Piñon Canyon would be the Army's largest single training area in the nation, tripling the size of the current site by adding 418,000 acres (1,690 km^{2}) of private ranch land. At 650,000 acres (2630 km^{2}), it would be nearly the size of the state of Rhode Island.

Many in the local civilian population are opposed to this plan, because much of the land in rural areas that would be added to the training site is civilian-owned ranch land, and many current landowners are unwilling to be supplanted, regardless of the compensation that may be offered. The Pinon Canyon Expansion Opposition Coalition, an activist group opposing the plans, says that former maps it obtained from the Army showed a "future expansion area" significantly greater than is now being contemplated. The Army's position is that expansion is essential for preparing soldiers for battle in evergrowing theaters such as Afghanistan and the Middle East.

On November 25, 2013, the U.S. Army announced that its plan to expand the Piñon Canyon Maneuver site had been cancelled.

In response to a Congressional ban on Army funding for an expansion plan, the United States Air Force moved in with a plan to use the area for V-22 Osprey flights.

=== Notable former Fort Carson soldiers ===
- John E. Butts (1922–1944), Medal of Honor recipient for whom the Fort Carson airfield is named
- Wesley Clark (1944- ), Supreme Allied Commander Europe
- Martin Dempsey (1952- ), Chairman of the Joint Chiefs of Staff
- Harold K. Johnson (1912–1984), US Army Chief of Staff
- Andrew Maynard (1964- ), gold medalist boxer (1988 Summer Olympics)
- Boyd Melson (1981- ), boxer
- Colin Powell (1937–2021), Chairman of the Joint Chiefs of Staff and U.S. Secretary of State
- Dennis Reimer (1939- ), US Army Chief of Staff
- Lionel Rivera (1956- ), mayor of Colorado Springs
- Bernard W. Rogers (1921–2008), US Army Chief of Staff, and NATO Supreme Allied Commander Europe, and Commander in Chief, US European Command
- John William Vessey, Jr. (1922–2016), US Army general and Chairman of the Joint Chiefs of Staff, 1982–1985

== Census-designated place ==
Fort Carson, Colorado
- Census-designated place
- Location of the Fort Carson CDP in El Paso County, Colorado
- Coordinates: 38°43′30″N 104°46′05″W
- Country: United States
- State: Colorado
- County: El Paso

Government
  - Type: Federal Military Government/Garrison

Area
  - Total: 27.998 sq mi (72.515 km^{2})
  - Land: 27.969 sq mi (72.440 km^{2})
  - Water: 0.029 sq mi (0.075 km^{2})
- Elevation: 5,840 ft (1,780 m)

Population (2020)
  - Total: 17,693
  - Density: 632.59/sq mi (244.24/km^{2})
- Time zone: UTC−07:00 (MST)
  - Summer (DST): UTC−06:00 (MDT)
- ZIP code: 80902, 80913
- Area code: 719
- GNIS town ID: 2408234
- FIPS code: FIPS 08 27370

The Fort Carson census-designated place (CDP) includes the developed portion of Fort Carson located in El Paso County, Colorado, United States. The CDP is a part of the Colorado Springs, CO Metropolitan Statistical Area. The Colorado Springs post office (Zip Codes 80902 and 80913) serves Fort Carson postal addresses. At the 2020 United States census, the population of the Fort Carson CDP was 17,693.

=== Geography ===
The Fort Carson CDP has an area of 17,919 acres (72.515 km^{2}), including 19 acres (0.075 km^{2}) of water.

=== Demographics ===
The United States Census Bureau initially defined the Fort Carson CDP for the 1970 United States census.

Fort Carson CDP, Colorado
Year	Pop.	±%
1970	19,399	—
1980	13,219	−31.9%
1990	11,309	−14.4%
2000	10,566	−6.6%
2010	13,813	+30.7%
2020	17,693	+28.1%
Source: United States Census Bureau

== Education ==
Fountain-Fort Carson School District 8 operates K-12 schools on post. Elementary schools on post are:

- Abrams Elementary
- Mountainside Elementary
- Patriot Elementary
- Weikel Elementary

The middle school, Carson Middle School, is on post. Fountain Fort Carson High School is off post.

== Notable people ==
- Charley Pride, Country singer, guitarist, and professional baseball player
- Michael T. Voorhees, engineer, designer and geographer

== See also ==
- Front Range Urban Corridor
- List of military installations in Colorado
- List of populated places in Colorado
