= Stephen Maranian =

US Army major general

Stephen J. Maranian
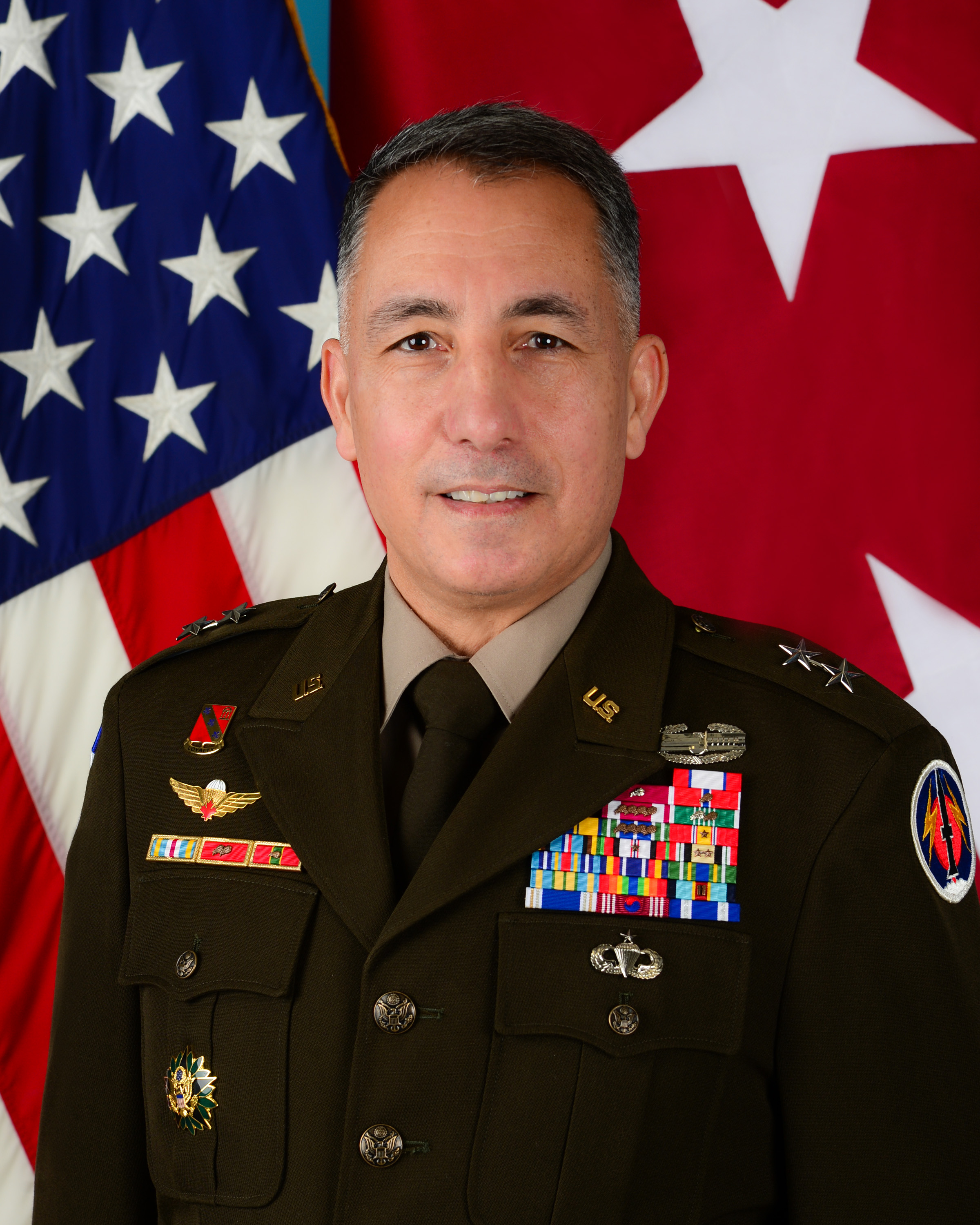
- Official portrait, 2022
- Born: Natick, Massachusetts, U.S.
- Alma mater: Bucknell University; Webster University; United States Army Command and General Staff College; United States Army War College; Defense Language Institute
- Spouse: Cynthia Maranian (m. 1993)
- Military career
- Allegiance: United States of America
- Branch: United States Army
- Service years: 1988–2023
- Rank: Major General
- Nickname: Steve
- Commands: 56th Artillery Command; United States Army War College; Army University; United States Army Field Artillery School; 19th Battlefield Coordination Detachment; 4th Battalion, 319th Field Artillery Regiment; Headquarters and Headquarters Battery, 1st Cavalry Division Artillery; Battery C, 2nd Battalion, 82nd Field Artillery
- Awards: Army Distinguished Service Medal (2); Legion of Merit (6); Bronze Star Medal (2); Meritorious Service Medal (5); Army Commendation Medal (7); Air Force Commendation Medal (2); Army Achievement Medal (5); Order of National Security Merit (Republic of Korea); Land Forces Emblem of Honor (Romania); Senior Parachutist Badge

Stephen J. Maranian is a retired major general who served in the United States Army from 1988 to 2023. Commissioned as a Field Artillery officer, Maranian served continuously on active duty, commanding from the platoon to the two-star level. In his final assignment he served as commanding general of the 56th Artillery Command in Mainz-Kastel, Germany from 2021 to 2023. Maranian served in combat deployments in Afghanistan and Iraq and more than half of his career was spent overseas. Maranian holds two master's degrees and is a graduate of both the United States Army Command and General Staff College and the United States Army War College; he has also graduated from the NATO Defense College and the Defense Language Institute.

His other General Officer commands included serving as commandant of the United States Army War College from July 2020 to August 2021, and as commandant of the United States Army Field Artillery School from June 2016 to May 2018 while dual-hatted as director of the Long Range Precision Fires Cross-Functional Team from October 2017 to May 2018. Other assignments as a General Officer included serving as the deputy commanding general of the 2nd Infantry Division in South Korea from May 2018 to May 2019 and as the deputy commanding general for education of the United States Army Combined Arms Center, provost of the Army University, and deputy commandant of the U.S. Army Command and General Staff College from June 2019 to July 2020.

In August 2021, Maranian was selected to activate and command the 56th Artillery Command in Mainz-Kastel, Germany. The 56th Artillery Command is the U.S. Army's only Theater Fires Command and as such it is the senior Field Artillery command in the European/African areas of responsibility. Maranian activated the 56th in a ceremony held on November 8, 2021.

== Education ==
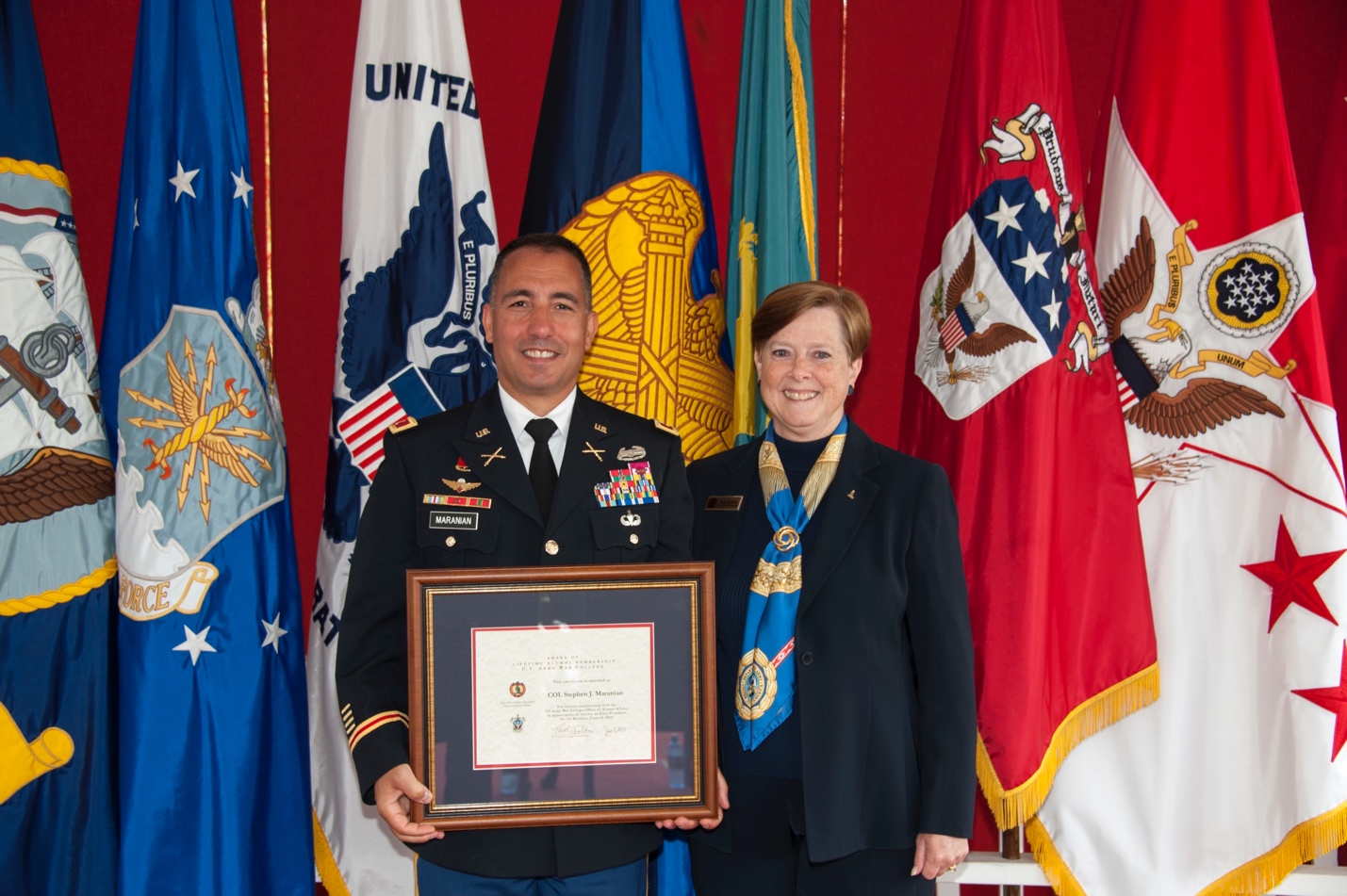
Class President, Colonel Stephen Maranian, U.S. Army (left) being awarded the U.S. Army War College Association's Lifetime Membership Award by Colonel Ruth Collins, U.S. Army (Retired) at Carlisle Barracks, Pennsylvania, in June 2013.

Maranian grew up in Natick, Massachusetts, where he attended elementary through high school. He graduated from Bucknell University in 1988 with a bachelor's degree in Business Administration. Maranian also holds two master's degrees, one in Human Resources Development and one in Strategic Studies. He is a graduate of the United States Army Command and General Staff College and the U.S. Army War College, the latter where he served as the student class president for the Resident Class of 2013. He also attended the NATO Defense College, and the Greek Language Course (honor graduate) at the Defense Language Institute.

== Career ==
Commissioned as a Field Artillery officer in 1988, Maranian has led units from the platoon to the two-star level. He is a combat veteran, with deployments to Afghanistan, Iraq and Kuwait. In total, he has served 13 total overseas deployments and tours totaling 18 of his 35 years of active service

Maranian's commands began at the battery level with two units in the 1st Cavalry Division: Headquarters and Headquarters Battery, Division Artillery, and Battery C, 2nd Battalion, 82nd Field Artillery—both in Fort Hood, Texas, and the latter also in Kuwait. His battalion command was with the 4-319th Airborne Field Artillery Regiment within the 173rd Airborne Brigade in Bamberg, Germany and forward deployed for 15 months to Afghanistan. He also commanded the 19th Battlefield Coordination Detachment at Ramstein Air Base in Germany.

In 2015–2016, Maranian served as the chief of staff of the U.S. Army Africa/Southern European Task Force in Italy, participating in events such as the African Land Forces Summit 2016. In June 2016, Maranian transitioned to become the commandant of the Field Artillery School and chief of Field Artillery at Ft. Sill, Oklahoma. Subsequently, he served as the Director for the U.S. Army's Long Range Precision Fires (LRPF) Cross-Functional Team through May 2018, which comprised members of organizations from across the U.S. Army and Marine Corps with the purpose of focusing of modernizing "field artillery forces to be able to deliver lethal, long-range precision fires in order to be able to compete, deter and win on the modern battlefield". His following assignment was as the deputy commanding general for maneuver of the 2nd Infantry Division in South Korea. In June 2019, Maranian assumed the post of Combined Arms Center–Education deputy commanding general, Army University provost and CGSC deputy commandant. He was promoted to Major General on December 2, 2019.

In July 2020, he assumed the duties as the commandant of the U.S. Army War College in Carlisle, Pennsylvania. With the school's provost, MG Maranian "directed revisions and innovations in curriculum and teaching methodologies; and hired faculty with expertise in emerging issues, e.g., futures, data analysis, and environmental security". Also, under his tenure, the "Strategic Studies Institute and Center for Strategic Leadership refocused their ideas and expertise in analysis and experimentation to align with pressing strategic issues".

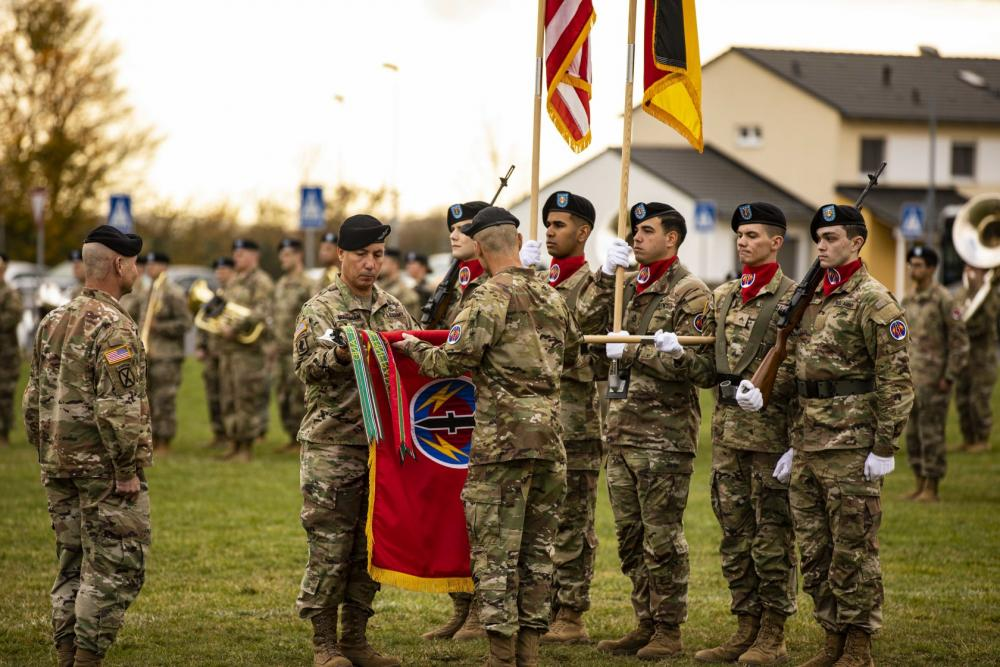
Maj. Gen. Stephen J. Maranian and Command Sgt.Maj. Darrell E. Walls uncase the colors of the 56th Artillery Command in Wiesbaden, Germany on November 8, 2021.

In August 2021, the Chief of Staff of the Army announced that he would be assigned as the commanding general of the 56th Field Artillery Command. He relinquished command of the Army War College to Major General David C. Hill on August 31, 2021 and assumed command of the 56th Artillery Command on November 8, 2021. As commanding general of the 56th Artillery Command, Maranian focused the command on building interoperability with NATO Allies through personal engagement with the senior leaders of NATO armies, and through the unit's exercise program. During 2022, the 56th's exercises tested new concepts for linking artillery forces. During Exercise Dynamic Front '22 in July, 2022 the unit successfully paired a U.S. artillery brigade with a multinational fires brigade comprising 11 nations, with NATO's Allied Rapid Reaction Corps providing command and control; a notable "first". Maranian's interoperability efforts were notable in the high north, visiting Scandinavian and Baltic nations and exercising interoperability in bi-lateral training events.

In early 2023, Maranian continued efforts to enhance NATO armies' artillery interoperability visiting several Allied nations, hosting an International Fires Warfighting Forum in Wiesbaden, Germany, and setting conditions for the Dynamic Front 2023 Exercise in Grafenwöhr, Germany and Oksbøl, Denmark. Exercise Dynamic Front 23 proved to be the most significant Artillery interoperability exercise that the NATO Alliance had every conducted bringing together 18 nations to demonstrate technical, procedural and human interoperability. The exercise included a number of "firsts" including operating over a live Mission Partnered Environment, inclusion of Naval Gunfire, and simultaneous execution of live fire in three nations - Denmark, Germany, and Romania.

On February 17, 2023, the Army announced that BG Andrew Gainey would succeed Maranian in command of the 56th Artillery Command. The change of command took place on July 11, 2023, with Gainey becoming the second commander of the Army's only Theater Fires Command. Maranian retired in a small ceremony in Wiesbaden, Germany on July 14, 2023.

== Effective dates of promotions ==
Rank	Date
Second lieutenant	May 25, 1988
First lieutenant	September 30, 1990
Captain	February 1, 1993
Major	June 1, 1999
Lieutenant colonel	June 1, 2005
Colonel	September 1, 2010
Brigadier general	May 2, 2017
Major general	December 2, 2019

== Awards and decorations ==
U.S. military decorations
	Army Distinguished Service Medal (with one bronze oak leaf cluster)
	Legion of Merit (with one silver oak leaf cluster)
	Bronze Star (with one bronze oak leaf cluster)
	Meritorious Service Medal (with four bronze oak leaf clusters)
	Army Commendation Medal (with one silver and one bronze oak leaf clusters)
	Air Force Commendation Medal (with one bronze oak leaf cluster)
	Army Achievement Medal (with four bronze oak leaf clusters)
Unit awards
	Joint Meritorious Unit Award
	Meritorious Unit Commendation (with two bronze oak leaf clusters)
	Army Superior Unit Award (with two bronze oak leaf clusters)
U.S. service (campaign) medals and service and training ribbons
	National Defense Service Medal (with one bronze service star)
|	Armed Forces Expeditionary Medal
	Afghanistan Campaign Medal with one campaign star
	Iraq Campaign Medal with two campaign stars
	Global War on Terrorism Expeditionary Medal
	Global War on Terrorism Service Medal
	Korea Defense Service Medal
	Military Outstanding Volunteer Service Medal
	Army Service Ribbon
	Army Overseas Service Ribbon with numeral 12
International and Foreign Awards
|	NATO Meritorious Service Medal
|	Order of National Military Merit, Cheonsu Medal (Republic of Korea)
	Land Forces Emblem of Honor (Romania)
|	NATO Medal for Service with ISAF

Other Accoutrements
Combat Action Badge
Senior Parachutist Badge
Canadian Parachutist Badge
Army Staff Identification Badge

Military offices
Preceded by William A. Turner	Commandant of the United States Army Field Artillery School; 2016–2018	Succeeded by Stephen G. Smith
Preceded by Jonathan E. Howerton	Deputy Commanding General for Maneuver of the 2nd Infantry Division; 2018–2019	Succeeded by Gene D. Meredith
Preceded by Troy D. Galloway	Provost of the Army University and Deputy Commandant of the United States Army Command and General Staff College; 2019–2020	Succeeded by Donn H. Hill
Preceded by John S. Kem	Commandant of the United States Army War College; 2020–2021	Succeeded by David C. Hill
Command reactivated	Commanding General of the 56th Artillery Command; 2021–2023	Succeeded by Andrew C. Gainey
