= John S. Kem =

United States Army general

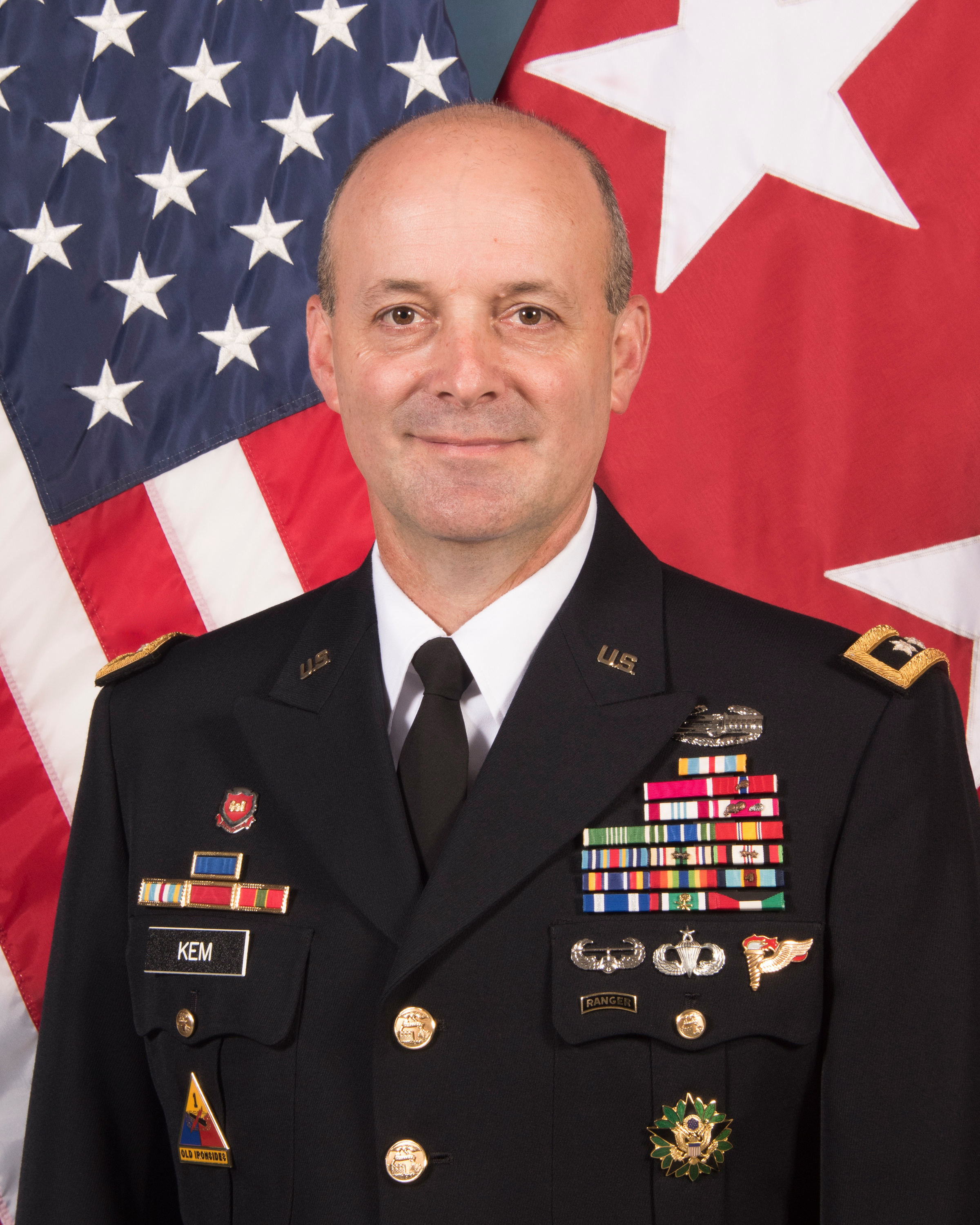
- Born: 1963 (age 62–63)
- Alma mater: United States Military Academy (BS); Northwestern University (MS); Kellogg Business School (MBA); Dwight D. Eisenhower School for National Security and Resource Strategy (MS); United States Army Command and General Staff College
- Relatives: Richard S. Kem (father)
- Military career
- Allegiance: United States
- Branch: United States Army
- Service years: 1985–2020
- Rank: Major General
- Commands: United States Army War College; Army University; Northwestern Division; Europe District, North Atlantic Division; 16th Engineer Battalion, 1st Armored Division
- Conflicts: Iraq War
- Awards: Defense Superior Service Medal; Legion of Merit (2); Bronze Star Medal (2)

John Samuel Kem (born 1963) is a retired United States Army major general who last served as the 51st Commandant of the United States Army War College at Carlisle Barracks from July 28, 2017, to July 30, 2020. He previously served as the 1st provost of the Army University while dual-hatted as the deputy commanding general for education of the United States Army Combined Arms Center and deputy commandant of the United States Army Command and General Staff College. He was promoted to major general on October 3, 2016.

Kem earned his commission through a bachelor's degree in civil engineering from the United States Military Academy in 1985. He also holds a master's degree in Environmental Engineering and a master's degree in business administration from Northwestern University, the latter from its Kellogg Business School. He is a Chartered Financial Analyst and registered professional engineer in Virginia, where he resides in Annandale as of his retirement.

Military offices
Preceded by Anthony C. Funkhouser	Commanding General of the Northwestern Division of the United States Army Corps of Engineers; 2013-2015	Succeeded by Scott A. Spellmon
New office	Provost of the Army University and Deputy Commandant of the United States Army Command and General Staff College; 2015-2017	Succeeded by Scott L. Efflandt
Preceded by William E. Rapp	Commandant of the United States Army War College; 2017-2020	Succeeded by Stephen J. Maranian
