= Donn Hill =

US Army general

Donn H. Hill
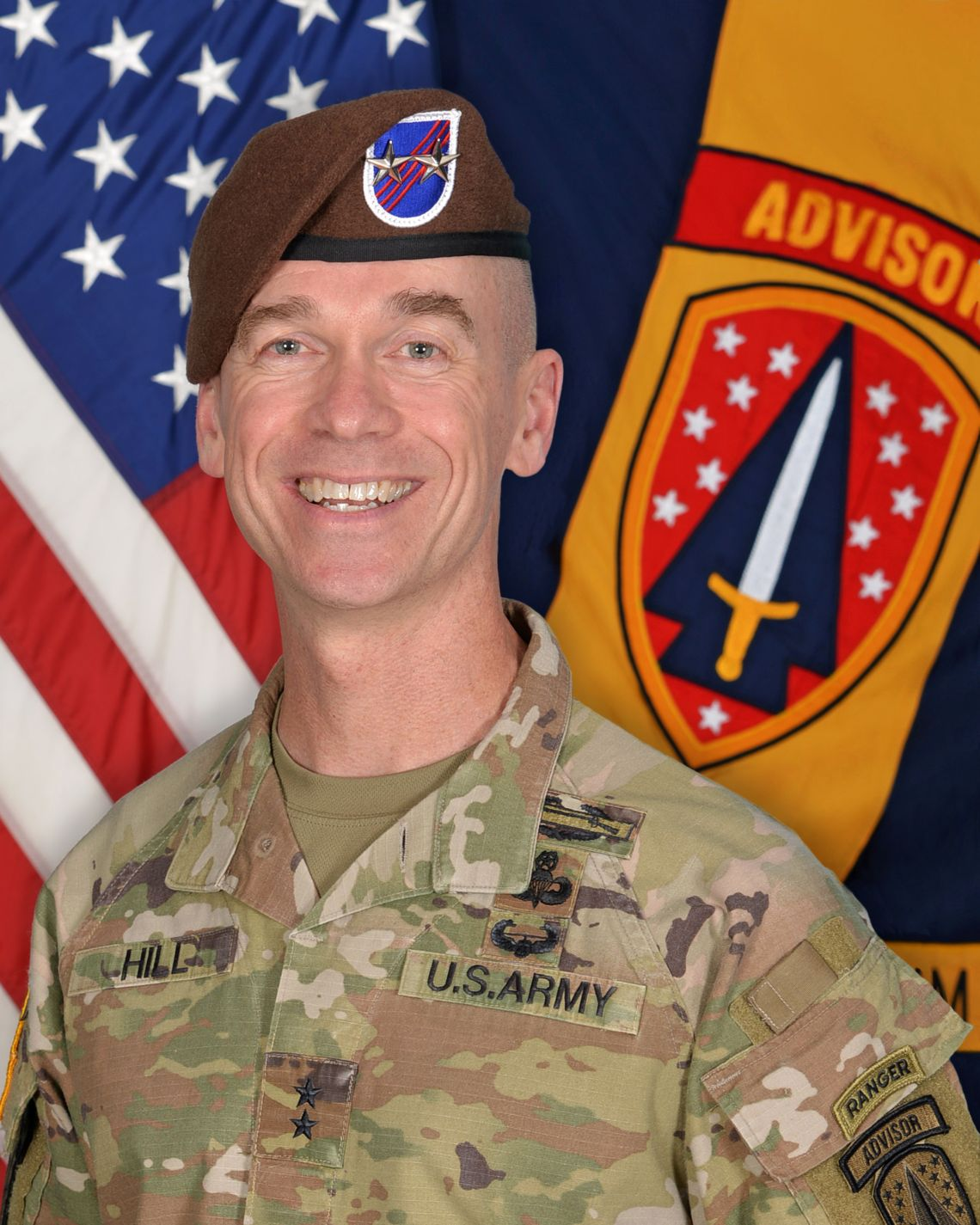
- Education: University of Kentucky (BA); United States Army Command and General Staff College (MMAS); United States Army War College (MS)
- Military career
- Allegiance: United States
- Branch: United States Army
- Service years: 1990–2024
- Rank: Major General
- Commands: Security Force Assistance Command; Army University; 2nd Security Force Assistance Brigade; Alpha Company, 1st Ranger Battalion; 2nd Battalion, 506th Infantry Regiment
- Conflicts: War in Afghanistan; Iraq War; Operation Inherent Resolve
- Awards: Legion of Merit (3); Bronze Star Medal (5)

Donn H. Hill is a retired United States Army major general who last served as commanding general of the Security Force Assistance Command from 2022 to 2024. He most recently served as the deputy commanding general for education of the United States Army Combined Arms Center, provost of the Army University and deputy commandant of the United States Army Command and General Staff College from 2020 to 2022. He previously served as commanding general of the 2nd Security Force Assistance Brigade.

== Dates of rank ==
Rank	Date
Second lieutenant	May 31, 1990
First lieutenant	May 31, 1992
Captain	July 1, 1994
Major	February 1, 2001
Lieutenant colonel	December 1, 2006
Colonel	May 1, 2012
Brigadier general	August 2, 2018
Major general	May 2, 2021

Military offices
New title	Commanding General of the 2nd Security Force Assistance Brigade; 2018–2020	Succeeded by Michael P. Sullivan
Preceded by Stephen J. Maranian	Provost of the Army University and Deputy Commandant of the United States Army Command and General Staff College; 2020–2022	Succeeded by David C. Foley
Preceded by Scott A. Jackson	Commanding General of the Security Force Assistance Command; 2022–2024	Succeeded by Kevin J. Lambert
