= Scott A. Spellmon =

U.S. military officer

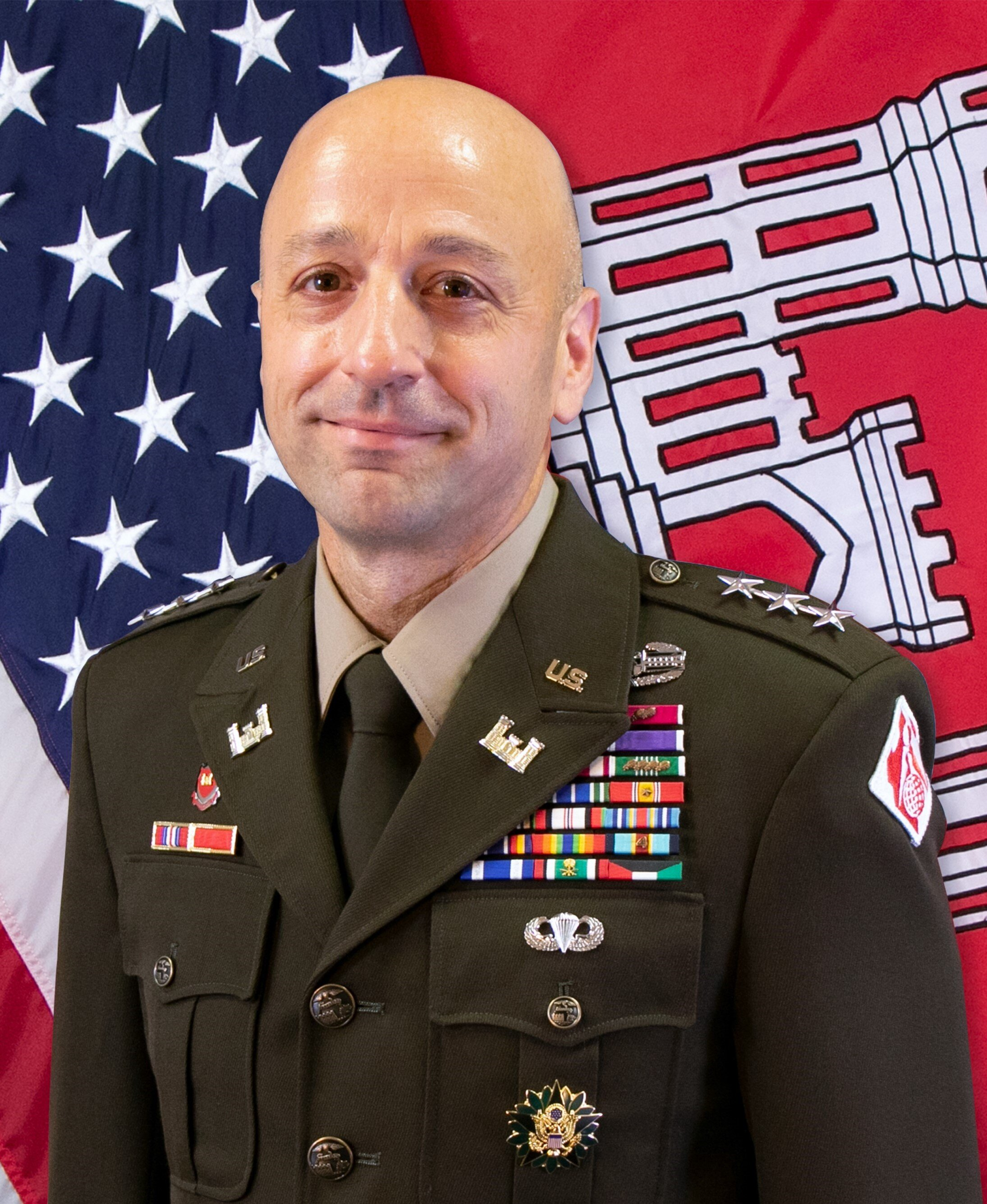
- Official portrait, 2020
- Born: November 22, 1963 (age 62); Bloomingdale, New Jersey, U.S.
- Alma mater: United States Military Academy (BS); United States Army War College (MS); University of Illinois (MS)
- Military career
- Allegiance: United States
- Branch: United States Army
- Service years: 1986–2024
- Rank: Lieutenant General
- Commands: United States Army Corps of Engineers; Northwestern Division; United States Army Operational Test Command; 1st Maneuver Enhancement Brigade; 317th Engineer Battalion
- Conflicts: Gulf War; War in Afghanistan
- Awards: Army Distinguished Service Medal; Legion of Merit (3); Bronze Star Medal (2); Purple Heart
- Scott A. Spellmon's voice Spellmon's opening statement at a House Appropriations subcommittee hearing on the FY2023 Army Corps of Engineers budget request Recorded April 27, 2022

Scott Alan Spellmon (born November 2, 1963) is a retired United States Army lieutenant general who last served as the 55th Chief of Engineers and the commanding general of the United States Army Corps of Engineers.

== Early life and education ==
Raised in Bloomingdale, New Jersey, Spellmon graduated from Butler High School in 1982. He then attended the United States Military Academy, graduating with a Bachelor of Science in 1986 and commissioning into the Army Corps of Engineers. Spellmon also has received master's degrees from both the United States Army War College and the University of Illinois. Spellmon is the first person to hold the position of Chief of Engineers and commanding general of the Army Corps of Engineers since October 2000 without a Professional Engineering License (P.E.), though he does hold a Master of Science Degree in Civil Engineering from the University of Illinois.

== Military career ==
In January 2020, President Donald Trump nominated Spellmon to succeed Lieutenant General Todd T. Semonite as the 55th Chief of Engineers. Spellmon was confirmed by Congress and officially assumed duties on September 10, 2020. During his career LTG Spellmon served at Fort Moore (Ft. Benning), Georgia; Fort Johnson (Ft. Polk), Louisiana; Fort Cavazos (Ft. Hood), Texas; Germany; and Fort Leonard Wood, Missouri. He also did three deployments for operations Desert Shield/Desert Storm, Iraqi Freedom and Enduring Freedom. He received the Purple Heart medal when he was wounded from the blast of an improvised explosive device in Iraq in 2005. LTG Spellmon underwent seven surgeries and skin grafts to recover from the ordeal.

== Post Military career ==
LTG Spellmon retired in September 2024. In February 2025 LTG (Ret.) Spellmon joined SOSi as Senior Account Executive in the defense and national security sectors.

Military offices
Preceded by John S. Kem	Commanding General for the Northwestern Division of the United States Army Corps of Engineers; 2015–2018	Succeeded by D. Peter Helmlinger
Preceded by Donald E. Jackson Jr.	Deputy Commanding General for Civil and Emergency Operations of the United States Army Corps of Engineers; 2018–2020	Succeeded by William H. Graham Jr.
Preceded by Todd T. Semonite	United States Army Chief of Engineers and Commanding General of the United States Army Corps of Engineers; 2020–2024	Succeeded by William H. Graham Jr.
