= AAFH =

AAFH may refer to:

- Addis Ababa Fistula Hospital, hospital, Africa
- "Army and Air Force Family Housing"; see U.S. Army Corps of Engineers, Europe District#* Army and Air Force Family Housing (AFH/AAFH) –
