= William H. Graham Jr. =

U.S. Army general officer

Lieutenant General William H. Graham Jr.
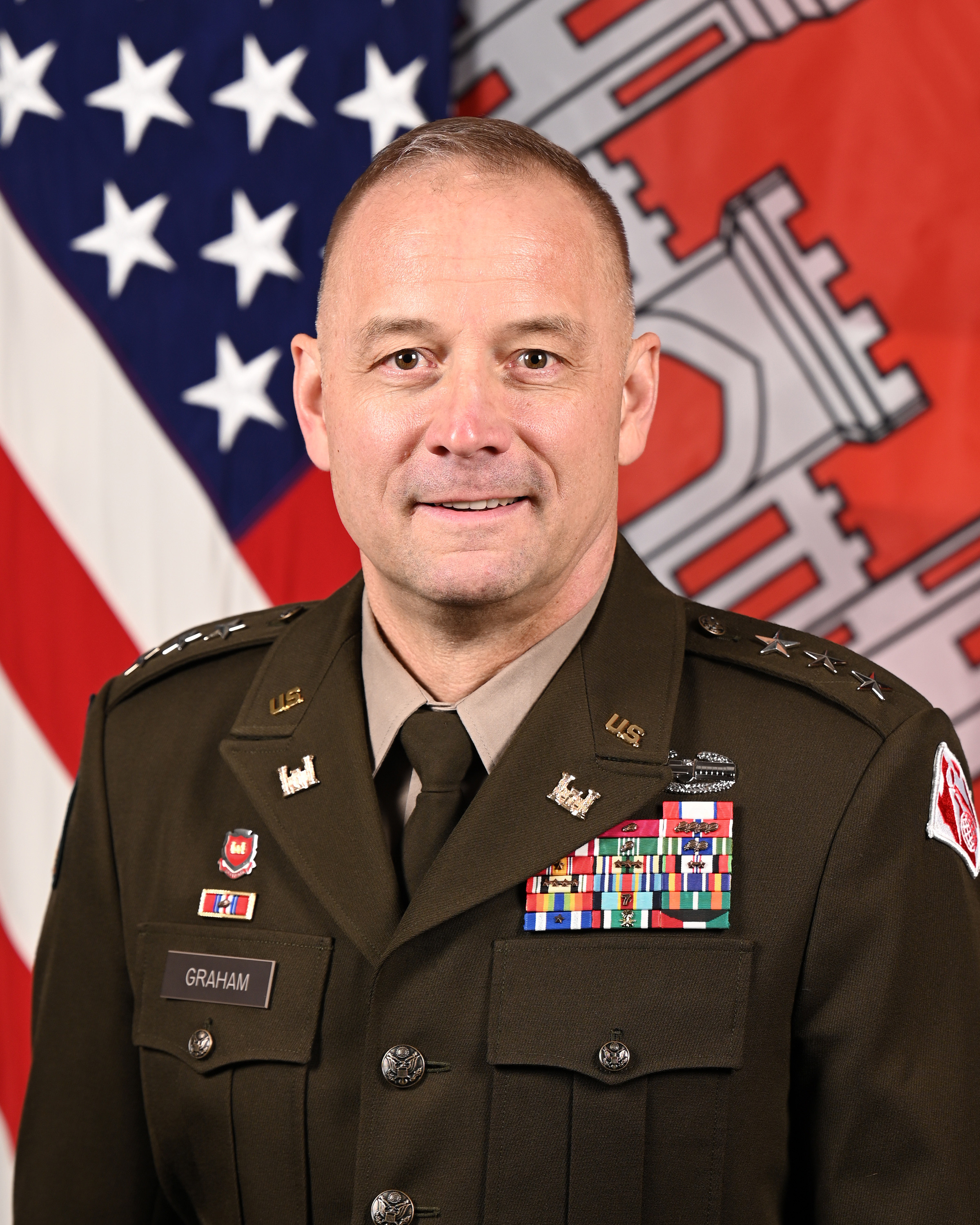
- Official portrait, 2024
- Born: c. 1967 (age 58–59)
- Military career
- Allegiance: United States
- Branch: United States Army
- Service years: 1989–present
- Rank: Lieutenant General
- Commands: United States Army Corps of Engineers; North Atlantic Division; Pittsburgh District; 40th Engineer Battalion, 2d Bde, 1st AD; A Company, 1st Engineer Battalion, 1st Bde, 1st ID
- Awards: Army Distinguished Service Medal; Legion of Merit (2); Bronze Star Medal (5)

William H. Graham Jr. (born c. 1967) is a United States Army lieutenant general who has served as the 56th Chief of Engineers and the commanding general of the United States Army Corps of Engineers since 13 September 2024. He most recently served as the deputy chief of engineers, deputy commanding general (for general matters and civil works) of the United States Army Corps of Engineers. He previously served as the deputy commanding general of I Corps.

In July 2024, Graham was nominated for promotion to lieutenant general and assignment as chief of engineers and commanding general of the United States Army Corps of Engineers.

Military offices
Preceded by Thomas J. Tickner	Commanding General of North Atlantic Division; 2015–2018	Succeeded by Jeffrey L. Milhorn
Preceded by ???	Deputy Commanding General of I Corps; 2018–2020	Succeeded by Stephen G. Smith
Preceded by Scott A. Spellmon	Deputy Commanding General for Civil Works and Emergency Operations of the United States Army Corps of Engineers; 2020–2024	Succeeded by Jason E. Kelly
Preceded by Richard J. Heitkamp	Deputy Chief of Engineers and Deputy Commanding General of the United States Army Corps of Engineers; 2023–2024	Succeeded by Kimberly A. Colloton
Preceded by Scott A. Spellmon	United States Army Chief of Engineers and Commanding General of the United States Army Corps of Engineers; 2024–present	Incumbent
