= Todd T. Semonite =

U.S. military officer

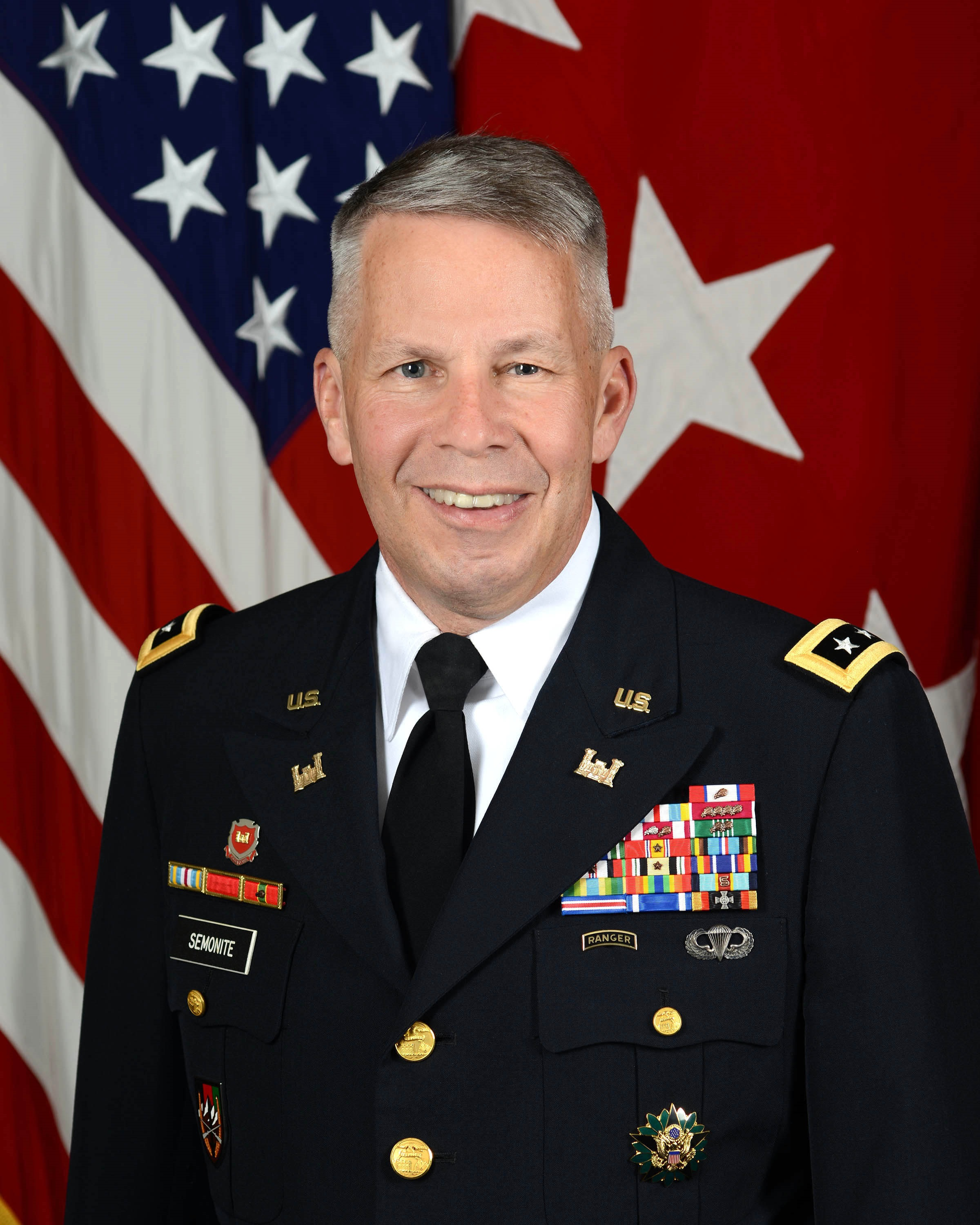
- Official portrait, 2016
- Born: May 29, 1957 (age 69); Bellows Falls, Vermont, U.S.
- Alma mater: United States Military Academy (BS); University of Vermont (MS); United States Army Command and General Staff College (MMAS)
- Military career
- Allegiance: United States
- Branch: United States Army
- Service years: 1979–2020
- Rank: Lieutenant General
- Commands: United States Army Corps of Engineers; South Atlantic Division; North Atlantic Division; 130th Engineer Brigade; 23rd Engineer Battalion
- Conflicts: War in Afghanistan; Iraq War
- Awards: Army Distinguished Service Medal (2); Defense Superior Service Medal; Legion of Merit (5); Bronze Star Medal

Todd Thurston Semonite (born May 29, 1957) was the 54th chief of engineers of the United States Army and the commanding general of the United States Army Corps of Engineers. Semonite graduated from the United States Military Academy with a Bachelor of Science degree in civil engineering and was commissioned into the Army Corps of Engineers in 1979. He also holds a Master of Science degree from the University of Vermont and a Master of Military Art and Science from the United States Army Command and General Staff College.

== U.S.-Mexico border wall ==
During a September 2019 visit to a new section of border wall near San Diego, President Donald Trump said the wall was "wired so that we will know if somebody's trying to break through." When Trump was asked to provide reporters with further details, Semonite cautioned him, "Sir, there could be some merit in not discussing that."

== 2020 COVID-19 pandemic response ==
In March 2020, Semonite gave the Pentagon briefing on how the US military would initiate and lead an effort to lease a large number of facilities nationwide in hotels and in larger open buildings to increase the number of rooms and beds with Intensive care unit capability for the COVID-19 pandemic. USACE handles leasing and engineering, with contracts for rapid facility modification and setup to local contractors. The plan envisions that the facilities' operation and the provision of medical staff will be handled entirely by the various states rather than the federal government.

Military offices
Preceded by Thomas P. Bostick	Chief of Engineers; 2016–2020	Succeeded by Scott A. Spellmon
