= Stephen G. Smith (general) =

U.S. Army general

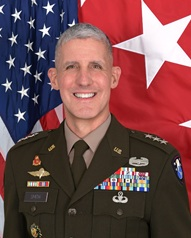
- Official portrait, 2026
- Alma mater: The Citadel; Mississippi State University; United States Army Command and General Staff College
- Military career
- Allegiance: United States
- Branch: United States Army
- Service years: 1991–2026
- Rank: Lieutenant General
- Commands: 7th Infantry Division; United States Army Field Artillery School; 18th Field Artillery Brigade; 2nd Battalion, 377th Field Artillery Regiment
- Conflicts: Yugoslav Wars; Iraq War; War in Afghanistan
- Awards: Defense Superior Service Medal; Legion of Merit (3); Bronze Star Medal

Stephen G. Smith is a retired United States Army lieutenant general who has served as the deputy commanding general of United States Army Western Hemisphere Command from December 2025 to July 2026. He previously had the same position for the United States Army Forces Command from April 2024 until it was dissolved in December 2025. He most recently served as commanding general of the 7th Infantry Division from 2021 to 2023. He previously served as deputy commanding general of I Corps from 2020 to 2021, as well as commandant of the United States Army Field Artillery School from 2018 to 2020. Smith also commanded the 18th Field Artillery Brigade from June 2013 to June 2015.

A native of Atlanta, Georgia, Smith was commissioned as a second lieutenant from the ROTC program at The Citadel in 1991. He holds a master's degree from Mississippi State University, and is a graduate of the Field Artillery Basic and Advanced Courses, the United States Army Command and General Staff College, the Senior Service College, and the Joint and Combined Warfighting School.

Military offices
Preceded by Robert D. Morschauser	Commander of the 18th Field Artillery Brigade; 2013–2015	Succeeded by John L. Rafferty Jr.
Preceded by Stephen J. Maranian	Commandant of the United States Army Field Artillery School; 2018–2020	Succeeded by Winston P. Brooks
Preceded by William H. Graham Jr.	Deputy Commanding General of I Corps; 2020–2021	Succeeded by Xavier T. Brunson
Preceded by Xavier T. Brunson	Commanding General of the 7th Infantry Division; 2021–2023	Succeeded by Michelle A. Schmidt
Preceded by Paul T. Calvert	Deputy Commanding General of the United States Army Forces Command; 2024–2025	Command disestablished
Command established	Deputy Commanding General of the United States Army Western Hemisphere Command; 2025–present	Incumbent
