= Richard S. Kem =

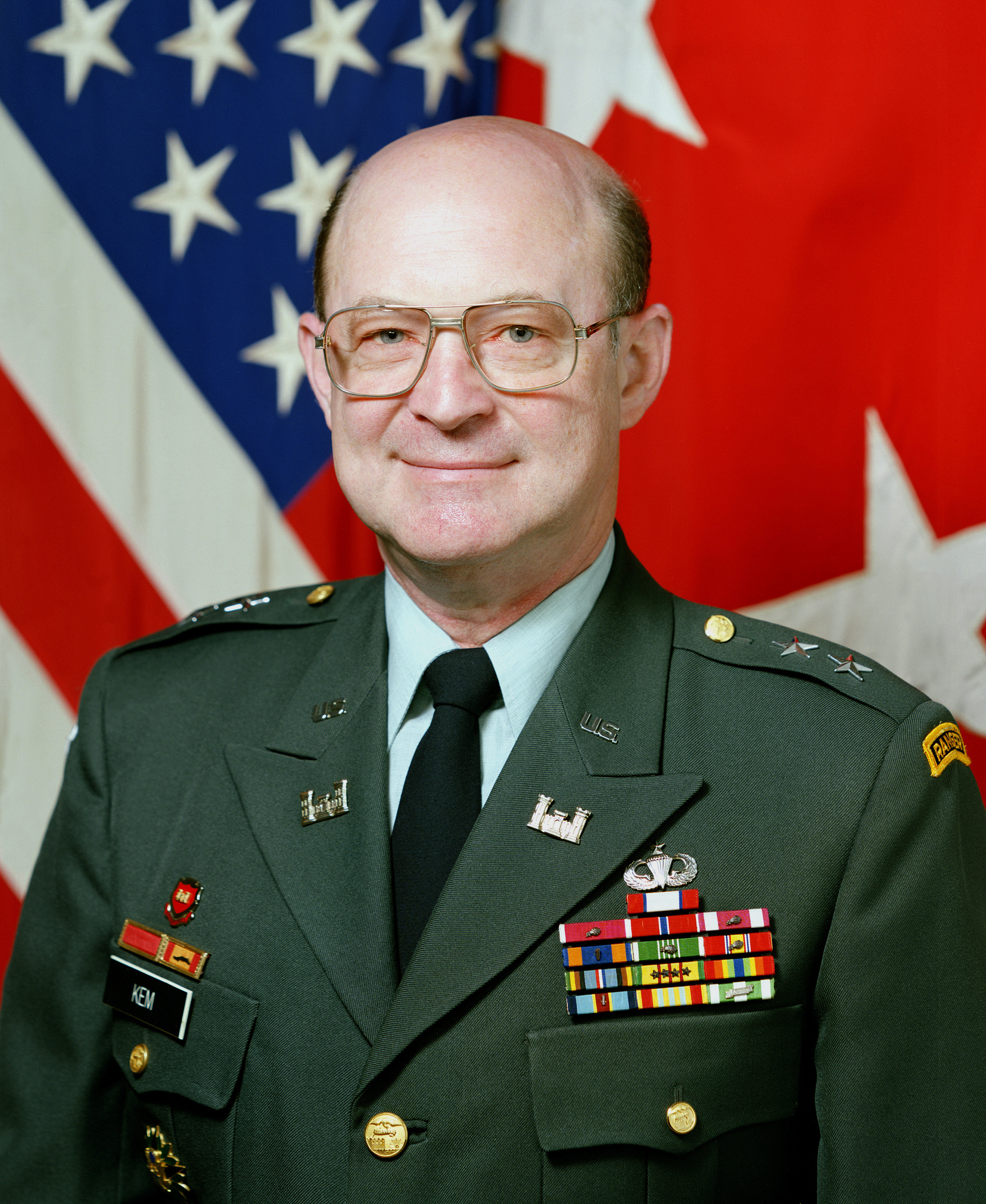
- Nickname: Sam
- Born: August 9, 1934; Richmond, Indiana, U.S.
- Died: April 1, 2016 (aged 81) Washington, D.C., U.S.
- Allegiance: United States of America
- Branch: United States Army
- Service years: 1956–1990
- Rank: Major General
- Commands: U.S. Army Engineering Center and Fort Belvoir; Ohio River Division; 7th Engineer Brigade; 577th Engineer Battalion
- Conflicts: Vietnam War
- Awards: Distinguished Service Medal; Legion of Merit (2); Bronze Star Medal; Meritorious Service Medal (2); Air Medal
- Children: John S. Kem

Richard Samuel Kem (August 9, 1934 – April 1, 2016) was a United States Army major general who served as Commander, U.S. Army Engineering Center at Fort Belvoir. His final assignment before his October 1990 retirement was as deputy commander of the Army Corps of Engineers.

Born and raised in Richmond, Indiana, Kem graduated from Richmond Senior High School in 1952. He then attended the United States Military Academy, graduating with a B.S. degree in 1956. Kem later earned an M.S. degree in civil engineering from the University of Illinois in 1962 and a master's degree in international relations from George Washington University. He graduated from the Army Command and General Staff College in 1968 and the Naval War College.

Kem commanded the 577th Engineer Battalion in Vietnam and the 7th Engineer Brigade in Germany. He commanded the Corps of Engineers' Ohio River Division from 1981 to 1984.

== Personal ==
Kem married Ann Callahan (April 9, 1936 – June 1, 2003) in 1960. They had a daughter and two sons. Their son John also served in the U.S. Army Corps of Engineers and retired as a major general.

Kem and his wife settled in Arlington County, Virginia, after his retirement from active duty in 1990. He worked there as Director of Public Works until April 2004. After her death in 2003, his wife was interred at Arlington National Cemetery on June 12, 2003. Kem remarried with Adelaide Mary Brown in 2004 and gained two stepdaughters. They moved to Washington, D.C., after his retirement from public service.

Kem died in Washington, D.C. after complications from hip surgery in 2016. He was interred next to his first wife at Arlington National Cemetery on December 13, 2016.
