= Portland District, U.S. Army Corps of Engineers =

United States Army military unit

- USACE Logo
- Active: 1871–present
- Country: United States
- Branch: United States Army
- Size: 1,100 civilian and 6 military members
- Motto(s): Essayons (Let us try)
- Colors: Red and White

The Portland District is one of the five districts within the Northwestern Division of the United States Army Corps of Engineers. The Portland District is made up of some 1,100 civilian and 6 military personnel.

For almost 140 years, the people of the U.S. Army Corps of Engineers' Portland District have played an important role in the region. In the past, District engineers constructed coastal fortifications, cleared river channels and surveyed the frontier. Future efforts will focus on resource management and a growing role in environmental protection. Portland District has responded to the needs and concerns of the people of this region for more than six generations, and will continue to do so.

== History (1871–present) ==
=== Opening the frontier ===
The Corps' role after the Revolutionary War was to survey and build roads, railways and bridges, to improve navigation on the nation's waterways, and to map the vast, unexplored wilderness that was this nation. But the Corps' Portland District office traces its beginnings to 17 April 1871, when Maj. Henry M. Robert stepped off the steamship Oriflamme onto Portland's bustling waterfront.

Robert was there to open the Corps' Portland Engineers Office—the forerunner of Portland District. He rented a single room in the Portland First National Bank Building as office space; installed one desk, one paper case, one map case, and four office chairs; then hired a clerk for $150 a month. The goals of the local office were loftier than the actual facility: to eliminate impediments to navigation in the region's rivers and to obtain a precise knowledge of the territory.

The region's network of waterways provided the means to export wheat and mining rushes, to import supplies, and to transport passengers. But boats had to be portaged around Cascade Rapids and Celilo Falls with mule-powered tramways. Drifting sandbars caused vessels to run aground and sometimes sink. Snags and debris in the rivers were constant dangers to shipping and coastal harbors were far from safe.

The Corps' first river and harbor work in Oregon was in response to a petition to Congress from Portland city officials' for help dredging the river bars that impeded shipping. During the next three decades, Corps engineers surveyed local rivers and rapids, and provided dredging, snagging, rock removal and bank protection. Jetty construction provided safe water at Coos Bay, Yaquina Bay, and the mouths of the Columbia, Siuslaw, Coquille and Nehalem rivers.

In 1902, construction was begun on a canal at the four waterfalls between The Dalles and Celilo – the sole remaining block to open river navigation for the 407 miles (655 km) upriver from the mouth of the Columbia to the current site of the Priest Rapids Dam.

=== Growth and large-scale resource planning ===
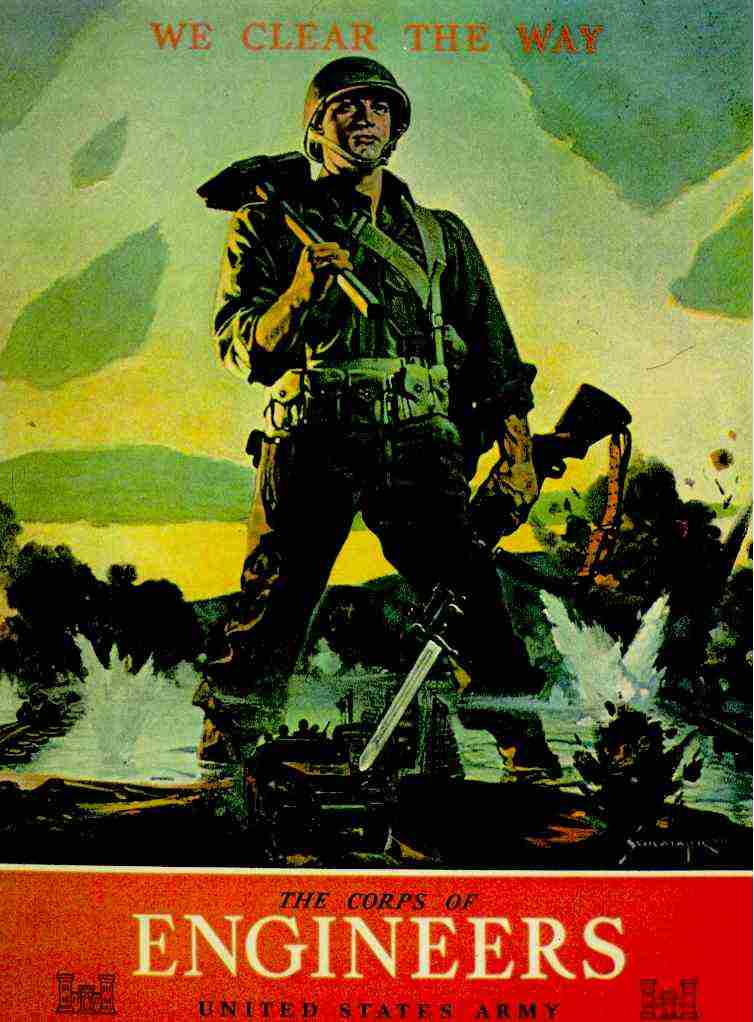
We Clear The Way World War II poster for the U.S. Army Corps of Engineers

Fishing on the Columbia was big business by 1906--fish wheels alone were harvesting one million pounds of fish annually. As early as 1888, the Corps reported concerns about reductions in the numbers of fish and recommended establishing fish hatcheries and regulating salmon fishing.

In 1918, the 300-foot (91 m)-wide, 30-foot (9.1 m)-deep navigation channel from Portland to the ocean was completed. Ocean-going cargo more than tripled in the next ten years.

After disastrous floods affected wide areas of the U.S. in the 1920s, the federal government was directed to help with problems that affected the public interest when they were too large or too complex to be handled by states or localities. Corps' expertise in navigation projects led to related missions: flood damage reduction, shore and hurricane protection, hydropower, water supply and quality, recreation and environmental protection.

Congress authorized the first big multiple-purpose project on the Columbia in 1933. Bonneville Dam construction generated thousands of needed jobs and a new era of prosperity for upstream ports, offsetting the impact of the Great Depression. It also covered the dangerous Cascade Rapids, provided fish ladders to protect the region's fish, and generated electricity for local homes and industry.

World War II gave Portland District a share of the military construction program—building training camps, air bases and defense installations in the Northwest. Barges hauling war supplies and ammunition through Bonneville Lock were a common sight. Inexpensive power from Bonneville to busy Portland and Vancouver shipyards and aluminum plants helped the war effort.

The Flood Control Act of 1936 marked the official beginning of federal commitment to flood prevention. Flood damage reduction emphasis shifted from keeping flood waters in river channels with dikes and levees, to a system of reservoir storage projects which would contain flood waters until they could be safely released. But the Flood of 1948 was unstoppable. Raging waters inundated roads, eroded developed agricultural land, and submerged 650 blocks of downtown Portland. When a dike ruptured near the town of Vanport, the entire community found itself under water. The 20-day flood took the lives of 39 people and economic losses exceeded $100 million. It was the greatest flood disaster in the history of the Columbia River Basin.

But since 1948, new dams and reservoirs have provided additional flood damage reduction. The 1964–65 flood (a 100-year flood) would have surged over Portland's sea wall and debris would have damaged every bridge crossing the Willamette except the St. Johns if the flood waters had been unregulated by storage.

Construction of Corps multiple-purpose projects continued in the 1950s and 60s. When The Dalles Dam opened in 1957, its navigation lock replaced the small, outmoded Dalles-Celilo Canal. The slackwater pool behind the dam flooded rock obstructions in the old open river channel and made irrigation of the adjacent land more economical. The John Day Dam began operating in 1968. A second powerhouse was added at Bonneville in 1981 and major rehabilitation of the hydropower facilities at Bonneville, The Dalles and John Day projects were initiated in the 1990s to meet the region's demand for clean, abundant, inexpensive electricity. A new navigation lock was opened at Bonneville in 1993 to accommodate increased river traffic.

=== The future: a balancing act ===
Portland District encompasses nearly 97,000 square miles (250,000 km^{2}) of land and water in Oregon and southwestern Washington. The District's future is tied to helping to balance the region's competing needs for navigation, flood damage reduction, hydropower, fish and wildlife habitat, disaster recovery, irrigation and recreation.

Portland District operates navigation locks on the Columbia-Snake Inland Waterway of 465 miles (750 km) and maintains over 720 miles (1,200 km) of federal navigation channels and harbors. More than 30 million tons of cargo pass through District ports and locks each year.

Flood damage reduction has improved since the days when the Willamette and the Columbia overflowed their banks almost yearly, laying watery waste to whole communities. Although the 1996 flood devastated many areas of Oregon and Washington, it would have been much worse if the Corps hadn't been able to store water behind their dams as it poured into the rivers from uncontrolled tributaries. District flood damage reduction projects—a $1.2 billion investment have already prevented $15.8 billion in flood damages.

With 22 multiple-purpose projects, Portland District produces 60 percent of the region's hydropower to meet the growing demands of public and private utilities, cities and industry. District projects also provide opportunities for fishing, boating, swimming, picnicking, and camping.

Corps reservoirs supply irrigation for local farmers and supplement municipal and industrial water needs. But as progress claims more land, habitat for fish and wildlife suffers. Portland District regulates work in water and fragile wetland areas along waterways and in wildlife habitat to preserve the environment. The Corps also controls water released from the dams to protect natural habitats during periods of fluctuating flows.

The Corps has a standing mission to provide engineering support in response to major disasters, such as the California earthquakes and Hurricane Andrew. When Mount St. Helens erupted in 1980, the effects on water quality and on the natural recovery of fish, wildlife and plant species were of primary concern in the Corps' response. After the Exxon Valdez ran aground, District dredges recovered nearly 400,000 gallons of oil from the waters of Alaska's Prince William Sound. Corps teams also were able to provide expert rehabilitation support to the people of the Philippines after the 1993 eruption of Mount Pinatubo.

The Water Resources Development Act of 1986 authorized the Corps to modify its existing projects for environmental improvement. Changes have ranged from the use of dredged material to create nesting sites for waterfowl, to modification of water control structures to improve downstream water quality for fisheries. Portland District environmental efforts range from large wetlands restoration projects like construction of waterfowl impoundment areas at Fern Ridge Lake, to helping save a small plant like the pink sand verbena or a small creature like the western pond turtle.

The biggest challenge Portland District faces may well be that of helping fish pass through the dams safely. Since the 1950s, the Corps has spent more than $70 million researching ways to protect anadromous (migratory) fish in the Columbia-Snake River system. The District has built and funds eight fish hatcheries, and every aspect of upstream and downstream passage is being evaluated. Models of Columbia River projects, like those at the Waterways Experiment Station in Vicksburg, Miss., are helping the Corps find answers and make changes that will work for fish.

== See also ==
- US Army Corps of Engineers
- Sapper
- Combat engineering
- Military engineer
