= Battlefield Coordination Detachment =

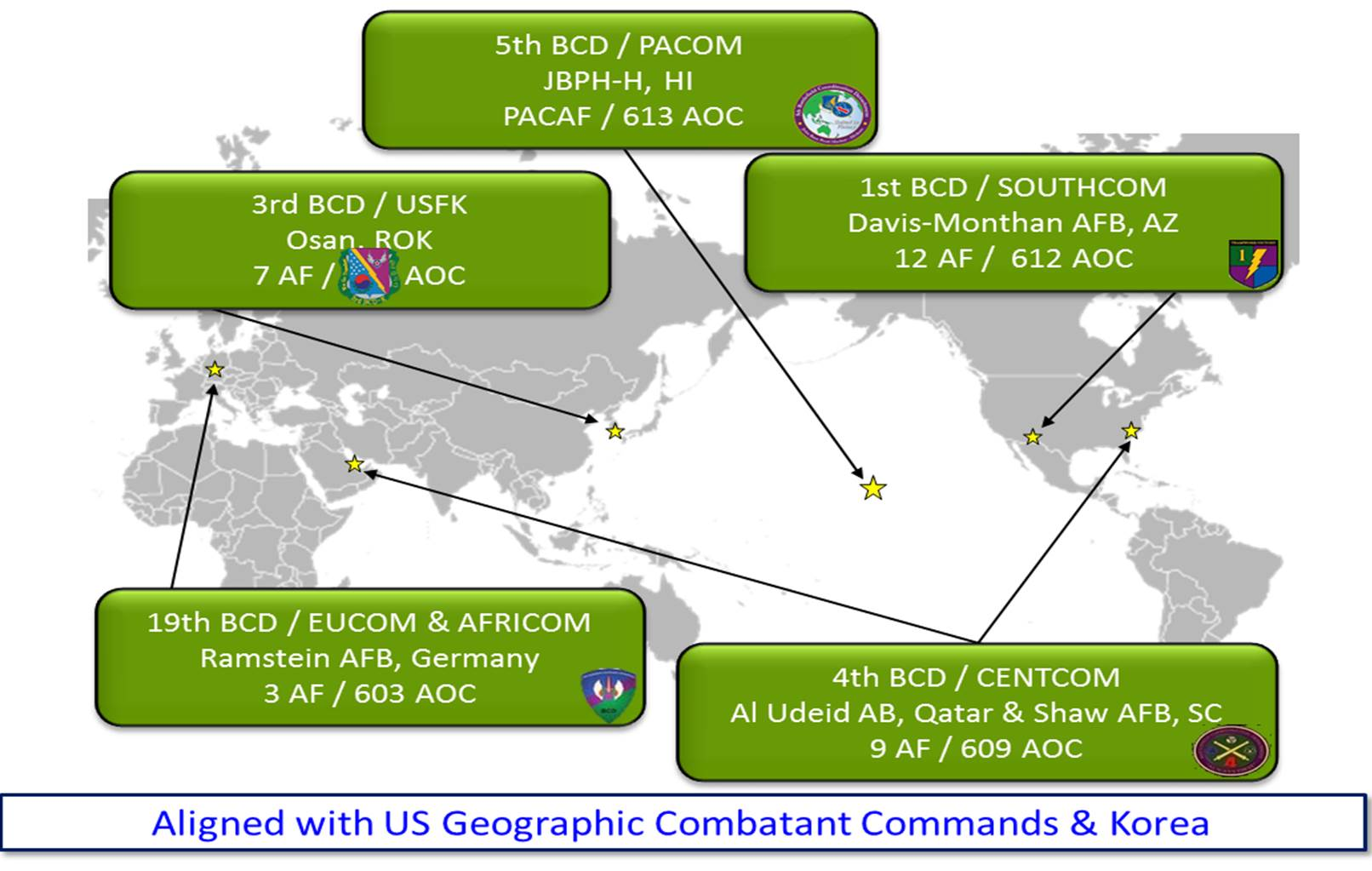
Graphic depiction of operational Battlefield Coordination Detachments as of 2014.

The Battlefield Coordination Detachment (US Army), or BCD, is the senior United States Army liaison element of the Army Air Ground System. The BCD serves as a bridge between the senior US Army headquarters element and the senior Air Force headquarters in each respective US combatant command or theater of operations. The BCD enables the coordination of Army-Air Force mission command, fire support, integrated air and missile defense, intelligence sharing, airspace management, and airlift. Additional space, cyber, and electronic warfare augmentation allow the BCD to further enable the designated Army force commander across the complete spectrum of warfare.

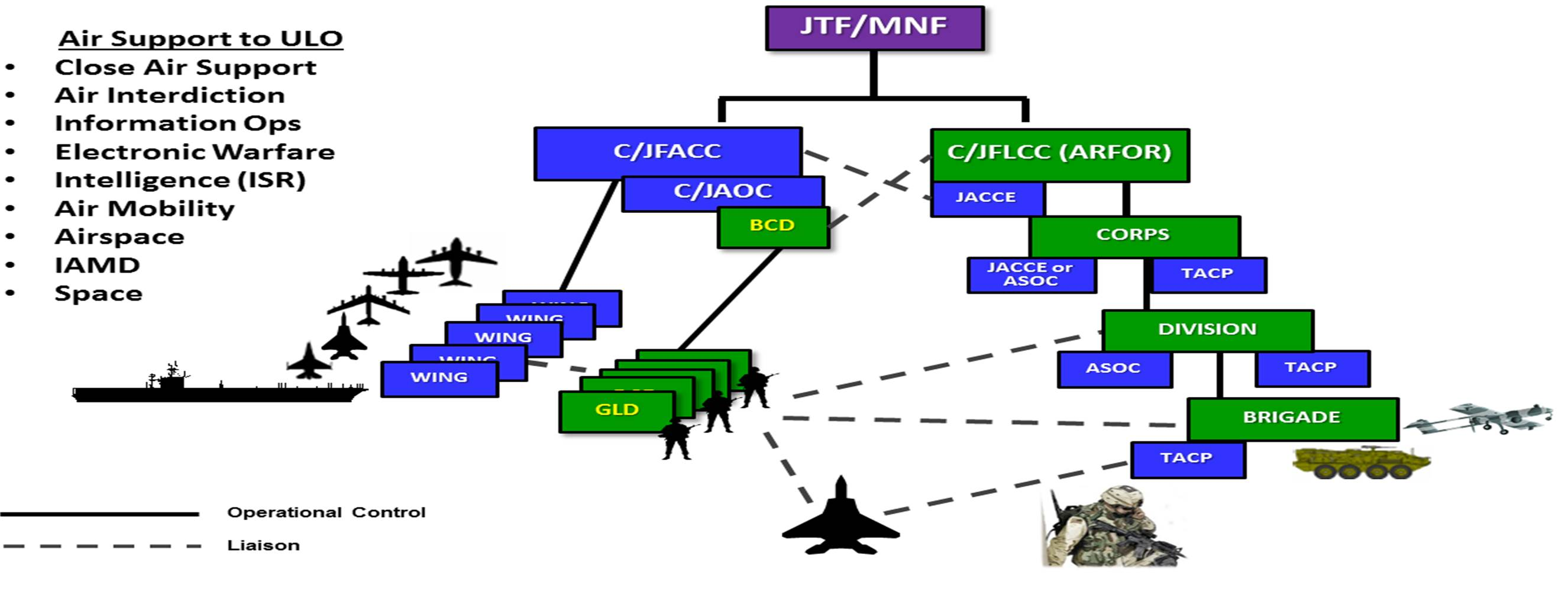
Simplified graphic depiction of the Theater Air Ground System/Army Air Ground Systems as they relate to BCD functions

== History ==
When the National Security Act of 1947 removed the Air Corps from the US Army it effectively disrupted the development of doctrine supporting fixed-wing close air support (CAS) and deep strike coordination as capabilities improved. As aircraft capabilities increased, so did the demand by the US Army for additional support for combat and mobility operations.

During the Korean War, CAS and Air Interdiction (AI) provided significant contributions to the war effort in disrupting enemy logistics, but failed to prove decisive according to US and PLA sources. Although the Air and Land Wars were generally aligned, they were not well coordinated.

The Vietnam War saw the US Army increase its reliance on helicopter gunships for CAS in addition to the development of Tactical Air Control Parties to provide terminal attack guidance at the tactical levels. Operational planning systems remained undeveloped and Air-Ground Integration continued to perform at sub-optimal levels as helicopter gunship support provided the intermediate solution to the US Army's Air-Ground Integration dilemma.

The 1980s witnessed the development of AirLand Battle Doctrine, which relied heavily on US Air Force capabilities to shape the attack of numerous echelons of Soviet Forces in Europe where US Army Artillery could not reach or provide an accurate means of attack. General Wilbur L. Creech, USAF, assisted in the Airland Battle doctrinal development and saw it as a means to prevent the US Air Force from losing tactical mission aircraft to the US Army. The paradigm shift away from the US Air Force from only supporting CAS missions for the Army to meet the operations needs required close coordination between the components at the operational level. A provisional organization called a Battlefield Coordination Element (BCE) was established and in 1984 a Memorandum of Agreement between the two branches of service continued to codify the support requirements needed to unify efforts.

The BCE was first officially employed in combat during Operation Just Cause, Panama, in 1989. Following the Gulf War, COL James Crigger, 9AF DCS Ops/CENTAF, specifically underscored the importance of the incorporation of the BCE into the Tactical Air Control Center for force synchronization.

In November 1995, an agreement between the US Air Force and US Army formerly established the requirement for liaison elements between the components to allow better air to ground coordination. The 1995 agreement defined the BCE as an Army liaison team that operated in the US Air Force Tactical Air Control Center (TACC), which was later re-designated the Air Operations Center.

The BCE structure remains nearly identical to the BCD of today, although there are now five established BCDs aligned with each US Geographic Combatant Command and the Korean theater of operations and their respective Combined/Joint Air Operations Centers. The development of joint doctrine codifying a comprehensive Theater Air Control System and Army Air Ground System allowed both the US Army and Air Forces to coordinate horizontally and laterally from operational staffs and tactical warfighters. BCEs or BCDs have supported US Army warfighters in every major joint military operation since Operation Just Cause and continue to evolve with the changing information environment. BCDs continue to work with partner Armies and Air Forces to build their capacity and interoperability to support humanitarian assistance/disaster relief operations as well as major combat operations.

== Organization ==
=== Headquarters ===
Each BCD is Commanded by a US Army Field Artillery Colonel. The Headquarters Section additionally provides communications and administrative support to the organization.

=== Plans Section ===
The BCD Plans Sections works in the AOC Combat Plans Division to integrate Army Force requirements into the Joint Air Tasking Cycle (ATC) and ultimately the Air Tasking Order (ATO) distributed from the Air Operations Center to each subordinate flying wing. Typical requirements supported are: US Army Force Air Interdiction Target Nominations, Air Support Requests (ASRs), Airspace, Airlift, Intelligence, and Air Defense to US Army elements.

=== Operations Section ===
The BCD Operations Section operates within the AOC Combat Operations Division (COD) on the operations floor to monitor the execution of US Army Air Support in the ATO. The Operations Section provides ground situation updates to the Combined/Joint Force Air Component Commander (C/JFACC) and Chief of AOC Combat Operations to allow expeditious decision making pertaining to Air Force support to the US Army. The Operations Section also coordinates US Army Fire Support to the Air Force, personnel recovery, dynamic targeting. The Operations Section also coordinates with the Navy, Marine, and Special Force Liaisons to the AOC to provide additional means of joint coordination. The BCD Operations Section placement in the AOC and integration into ARFOR planning/execution cycles as well as ABCS systems, allows it to have maximum situational awareness in the joint fight and provide very significant (albeit unseen) contributions to the ARFOR effort.

=== Intelligence Section ===
The BCD Intelligence Section works with the Intelligence Surveillance and Reconnaissance Division, Combat Plans Division, and Combat Operations Division of the AOC to support US Army intelligence collection requirements and exchange ground/air intelligence between components.

=== Airspace Section ===
The BCD Airspace Section works with the Combat Plans and Combat Operations Divisions of the AOC to incorporate US Army Airspace requirements into planning and execution of the ATO. The Airspace section is critical to the clearance of airspace for US Army artillery fires as well as the airspace deconfliction in support of rotary wing and unmanned systems.

=== Air Defense Section ===
The BCD Air Defense Section works in both Combat Plans and Combat Operations Divisions to serve as the advocate for US Army air defense as the ground battle develops as it pertains to critical asset defense. As the US Army ground component situation changes and units adjust to the operating environment, the BCD Air Defense Section informs the AOC of updated air defense requirements to ensure adequate defensive coverage by air and ground-based, defensive platforms. The BCD Air Defense section works in conjunction with the Area Air and Missile Defense Commands (AAMDC)to support US Army Force defense requirements.

=== Airlift Section ===
The BCD Airlift section works within the Air Mobility Division (AMD) of the AOC to ensure US Army Air Mobility requests are serviced in both the planning and execution phases of each air tasking order. The BCD Airlift section placement with the AOC AMD leverages the US Army's ability to coordinate the movement of personnel and equipment throughout the command and assist in sourcing assets. Pro-active communication between the Ground Liaison Detachment, the BCD Operations Section, and the Airlift section can greatly enhance mission command to US Army theater/corps/division HQs during complex, time sensitive airborne operations. BCD Airlift assigned members should attend the Logistics Track of the AOCIQTFTU-AMD Formal Training Course taught by the 435 TRS, and held at Hurlburt Fld, Fl.

=== Ground liaison detachments (GLD) ===
GLDs typically consist of a Field Artillery captain and a Field Artillery sergeant first class to provide the ground scheme of maneuver to a supporting air wing. GLDs are administratively under the control of the BCD, but work at their designated air wings or carrier strike groups supporting US Army operations. GLDs provide ground intelligence, coordinating data and maneuver information directly to the pilots who will fly a given close air support or airlift mission. The terminal control of missions are coordinated with US Air Force tactical air control parties assigned to US Army units and the US Army ground liaisons back at the Air Force wing will debrief pilots for any information pertaining to the result of the mission.
