= 2nd Security Force Assistance Brigade =

Brigade in the US Army (e. 2018)

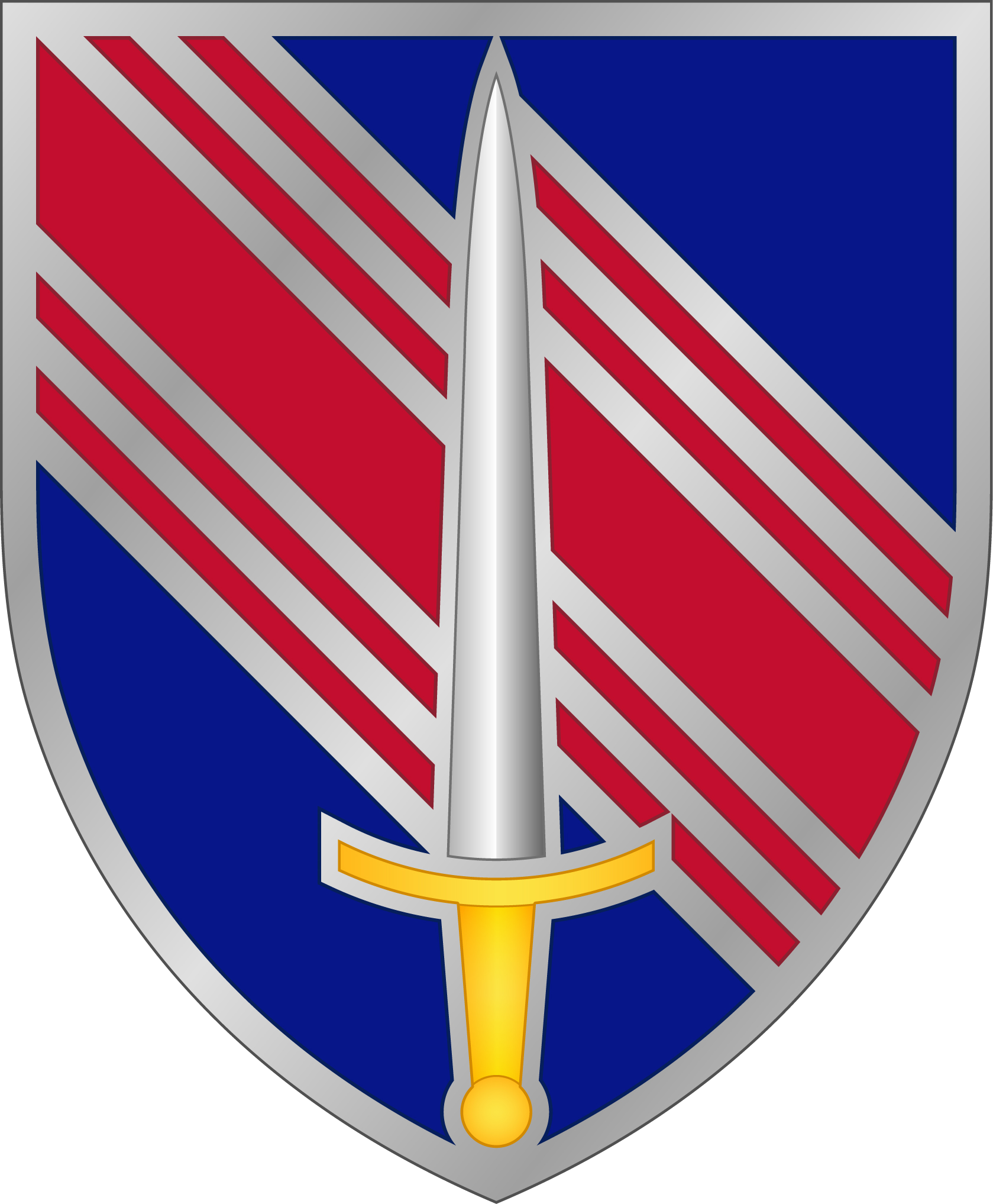
- Distinctive unit insignia
- Active: 29 November 2018
- Disbanded: 26 November 2025
- Country: United States of America
- Branch: United States Army
- Type: Security force assistance
- Role: Train and advise foreign militaries
- Size: 800 troops
- Part of: Security Force Assistance Command
- Garrison/HQ: Fort Bragg, North Carolina
- Color of berets: Brown

Commanders
- Current commander: Col. Grant Fawcett
- Command Sgt. Maj.: Paul M. Fedorisin

Insignia
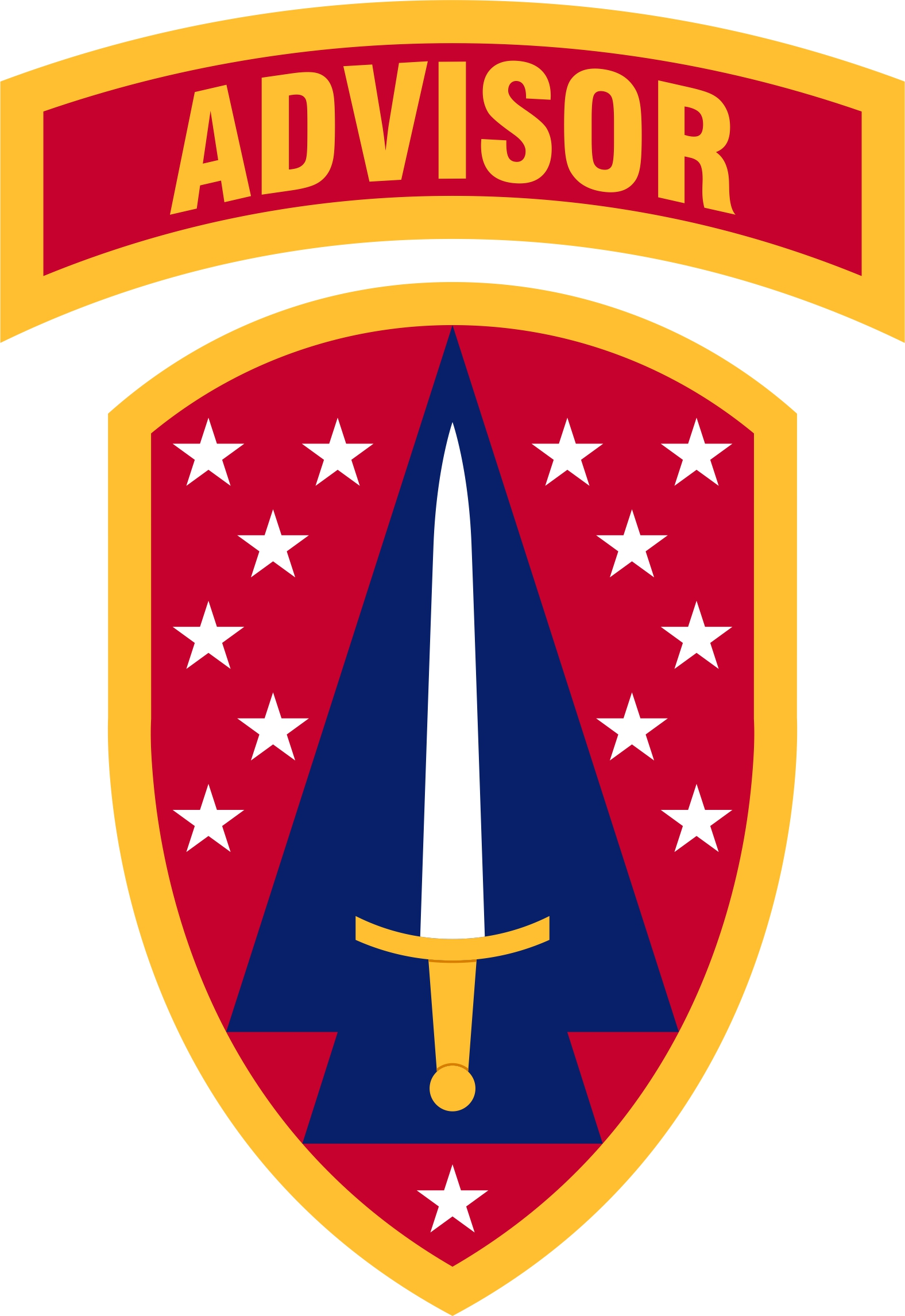
- Shoulder sleeve insignia

- Beret flash

The 2nd Security Force Assistance Brigade (2nd SFAB) was a security force assistance formation - a Security Force Assistance Brigade - of the United States Army. It was based in Fort Bragg, North Carolina, under the Security Force Assistance Command. Security Force Assistance Brigades are the dedicated conventional organizations for conducting security force assistance around the world.

In March 2021 the brigade was announced to be aligned with United States Africa Command. It focused on training counterparts in the Middle East and Africa. The brigade was disbanded on Wednesday, November 26, 2025 at Fort Bragg, NC.

== Formation ==
The 2nd SFAB was established on 29 November 2018, upon the return of the 1st Security Force Assistance Brigade from Afghanistan. It was scheduled to rotate in Afghanistan in Spring 2019, with assistance of some elements of the 1st SFAB.

The 2nd SFAB was planned to report to its first combat training centre rotation in January [2019] as the culmination of its ongoing training.

Each SFAB would have a regional focus and its capabilities would enable it to perform with minimal cultural and regional orientation.

Soldiers of the Brigade underwent training for a month at Fort Benning with the Military Advisor Training Academy, before receiving additional training in foreign languages, foreign weapons, cultural mediation, culture and other fields.

== Structure ==
The 2nd Security Force Assistance Brigade consists of 800 troops, and is based on the brigade combat team model, consisting of the Brigade headquarters and of related Battalions.

Each Battalion in turn provides the combat advisor teams, the operational units of a Security Force Assistance Brigade. Each combat advisor team is a small unit, consisting of about 12 troops per team, although additional soldiers may be assigned or attached to a combat advisor team in order to provide force protection.

== Garrison ==
According to Fort Bragg officials, the 2nd Security Force Assistance Brigade could be housed in space previously used by the inactivated 440th Airlift Wing.

The brigade provided maintenance assistance to the 201st Regional Military Training Center, 201st Corps, Afghan National Army in late 2019-early 2020 to help maintain their 1960-vintage Soviet D-30 122mm howitzers.
