= U.S. Army Corps of Engineers, Europe District =

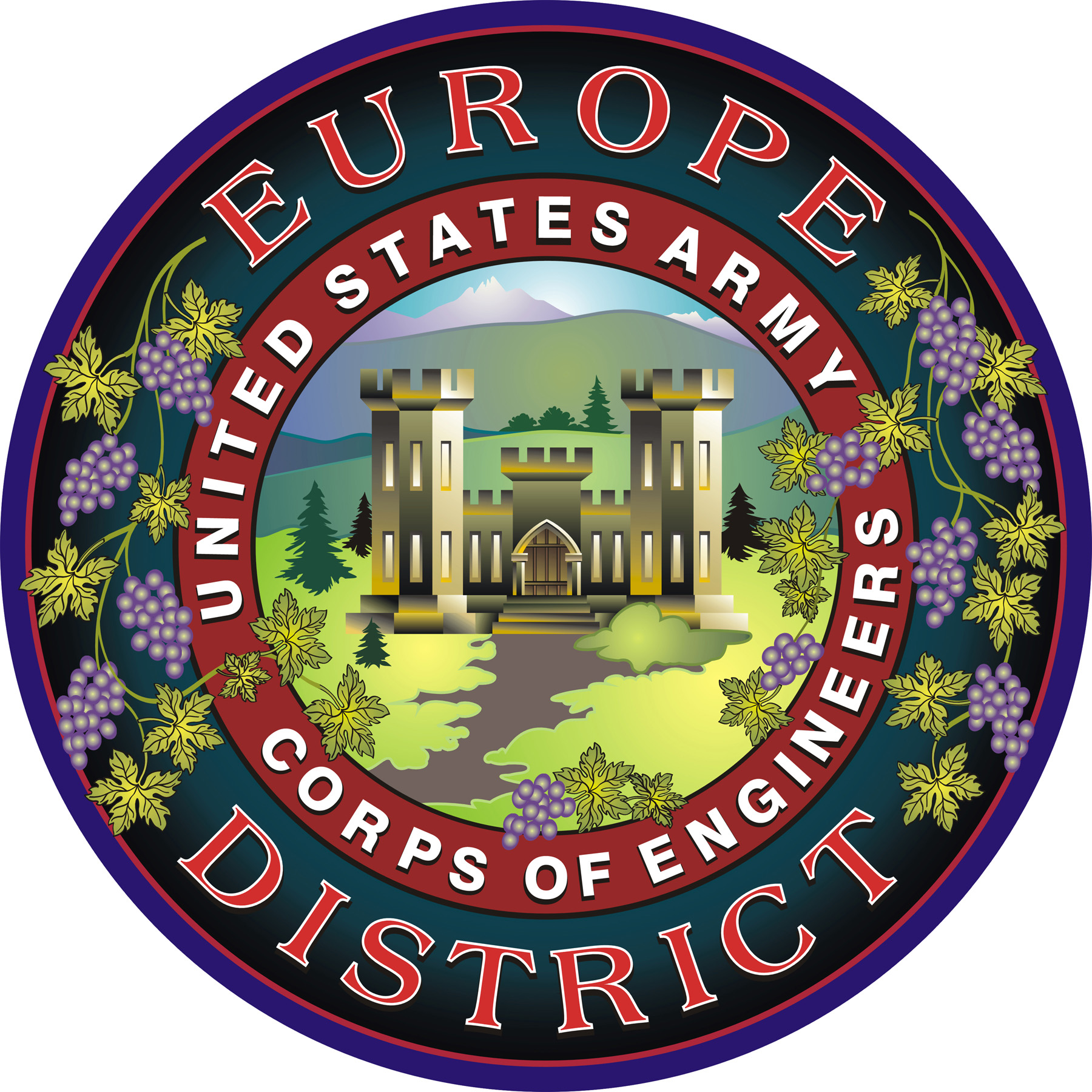
The U.S. Army Corps of Engineers, Europe District, logo

The U.S. Army Corps of Engineers Europe District, (NAU) provides both installation and contingency support to U.S. forces throughout the United States European Command and United States Africa Command areas of responsibility. Headquartered in Wiesbaden, Germany, the district, which is part of the North Atlantic Division, covers a widely dispersed geographic area from Western Europe across Eastern Europe and throughout most of the African continent. Work is executed from offices in Germany, Belgium, Turkey, Romania, Italy, Bulgaria, Georgia and more. The bulk of this work included Army and Air Force Family Housing units, forward operating sites in Eastern Europe, and training and operations facilities.

Europe District provides premier engineering, construction, stability operations, and environmental management products and services to the U.S. Army, U.S. Air Force, other U.S. government agencies and foreign governments throughout Europe and Africa.

In Fiscal Year 2023, Europe District awarded more than $1.4 billion in contracts to support its varied missions across Europe and Africa. This work ranges from projects geared toward enabling operational readiness like administrative facilities, training range improvements, forward operating sites, runways and prepositioned stock sites to projects that deliver on U.S. Army and Department of Defense quality of life promises like housing, Department of Defense Education Activity schools, and more.

== History ==
The U.S. Army Corps of Engineers, Europe Division was activated on July 1, 1974 in Frankfurt, Germany. The unit continued the construction missions and legacy of the former Engineer Command and other Army engineering organizations in Europe that grew following World War II. At that time, the bulk of Europe Division’s mission was spread throughout West_Germany, Belgium and the Netherlands and Europe Division’s construction placement in 1974 totaled $152 million.

=== Europe Division Grows ===
==== Expanding to the Mediterranean ====
Since the 1950s, the U.S. Army Corps of Engineers had a Mediterranean Division that managed design and construction of projects in Southern Europe, Turkey, Africa and the Middle East. In the 1970s, the Mediterranean Division’s missions in Europe, and especially in Turkey, were declining while the missions in the Middle East were growing. With the launch of the Europe Division, the Mediterranean Division’s missions were split with Europe Division taking over their military construction missions in NATO member states including missions at that time in Italy, Greece, Turkey and Portugal. In 1976 the Mediterranean Division was inactivated and a new separate Middle East Division was established with its headquarters in Riyadh, Saudi Arabia.

==== Turkey ====
In the 1970s the United States imposed an arms embargo (Turkey–United_States_relations#Greece_(Cyprus,_Arms_embargo)) on Turkey that had significant impacts on the military construction mission there. The embargo was lifted in 1978 and the U.S. Army Corps of Engineers reopened its field site in Turkey in Ankara in 1979 ahead of the signing of a new Defense and Economic Cooperation Agreement between the two nations in 1980. The U.S. Army Corps of Engineers presence in Turkey dates back to the 1950s and it was known then as “The U.S. Engineer Group.” It’s still known as the TUSEG office – an homage to the original office’s name in the 1950s – and is still part of Europe District. It is now based at Incirlik_Air_Base and manages construction at sites throughout Turkey.

==== Israel ====
In 1978, the U.S. Army Corps of Engineers began planning for a construction mission in Israel managing construction of two Israeli Air Force bases that had to be relocated in compliance with the Camp_David_Accords. The U.S. Army Corps of Engineers, North Atlantic Division set up its first offices in the country in April 1979. That mission eventually transitioned to Europe District, which managed it until 2024. In 2024 the now Europe District formally transferred responsibility for design and construction projects in Israel to the Middle East District in a ceremony in Israel after decades of managing that mission. The change was linked to the U.S. Central Command’s 2021 assumption of combatant command responsibility of Israel from U.S. European Command.

==== Growth in the 1980s ====
The 1980s saw growth in Europe Division’s mission – particularly in West Germany - with the official Europe District history referencing construction placement for the fiscal year ending 30 September 1987 being a then all-time high of $527 million. At the time, the Europe Division workforce numbered nearly 1,200.

=== The Cold War Ends – Europe Division Becomes Europe District ===
The late 1980s and early 1990s saw a great deal of change in Europe. By the end of 1991, the Warsaw Pact no longer existed, Germany was reunified and the Cold War had ended. This had a significant impact on U.S. military posture in Europe and subsequently reduced the U.S. Army Corps of Engineers military design and construction mission. With Europe Division’s mission reduced, Europe District was activated on March 1, 1991 replacing Europe Division and continues to operate today. At the time, its workforce had been reduced to 462 personnel, reaching less than 300 by the end of the year. Over the years, Europe District’s mission adapted to the changing European environment, with a focus on operations and maintenance work at existing building and installations growing into the 1990s. Europe District has continued to support various missions and initiatives over the years in line with U.S. national security interests and has since grown again over time.

=== Europe District’s Mission Grows ===
==== Europe District’s Mission in Africa ====
The U.S. Army Corps of Engineers has supported U.S. national interests in Africa since the 1950s, with various District and Division offices managing that mission over the decades. Europe District has been the lead for the mission in Africa for many years, supporting U.S. Africa Command, the U.S. State Department and others. Projects in Africa range from humanitarian assistance efforts like school and clinic projects to projects intended to build partner capacity like a new boat launch in Benin to enhance local anti-piracy efforts (https://www.africom.mil/article/35046/us-partnering-with-benin-to-combat-piracy-in-gulf-of-guinea) or a new national Emergency Operations Center in Togo (https://www.nationalguard.mil/News/State-Partnership-Program/Article/3819105/). Europe District turned over its largest modern project in Africa in 2023 - $38 million of improvements to the Nigerian Air Force’s Kainji Air Force Base. The work was part of a larger foreign military sale to Nigeria, which also included the delivery of 12 A-29 Super Tucano aircraft, precision munitions, and world-class training.

==== Europe District’s Mission in Caucasus Region ====
While Europe District had managed previous humanitarian construction missions in the Caucasus region in support of U.S. European Command initiatives, the mission grew in the late 2000s with a growing number of projects funded through the Office of Defense Cooperation in the U.S. Embassy in Georgia meant to increase Georgia’s capacity for border control operations. This mission continued into the 2010s and an office was established co-located with the U.S. Embassy that still manages a wide range of projects in the Caucasus region.

==== Europe District’s Growing Mission in Eastern Europe ====
Following the annexation of Crimea by Russia in 2014, the United States initiated the European Reassurance Initiative – later renamed to the European Deterrence Initiative. This DoD-funded initiative led to a significant increase in both the volume and geographic scope of Europe District’s construction mission. It funded growth in construction at enduring U.S. military installations in Europe as well as funded projects reinforcing and bolstering the capacity of installations of NATO allies. For example, since the beginning of EDI construction, Europe District has been involved in design and construction of projects in Poland, Estonia, Lithuania, Latvia, Hungary, Luxembourg and other countries. According to the Department of Defense, these projects are meant to “Enhance the capability and readiness of U.S. Forces, North Atlantic Treaty Organization (NATO) Allies, and regional partners of the U.S., to enable a faster response to any aggression within the U.S. European Command (USEUCOM) Area of Responsibility (AOR) and transnational threats by regional adversaries to the sovereign territory of NATO Allies.”

In the 2020s, Europe District continues to support U.S. national interest in Europe and Africa, with a current workforce of roughly 500 personnel in 2024 and projects in more than 40 countries.

== Mission ==
The United States Army Corps of Engineers Europe District provides planning, design, construction, environmental services, and project management to meet customer infrastructure requirements; engineering services supporting the Theater Security Cooperation Plan; and Field Force Engineering supporting contingency operations in the U.S. European Command and U.S. Africa Command areas of responsibility.

Within its geographic boundaries, NAU supports the following governmental agencies and foreign governments:

=== Armed Forces ===
- United States European Command
- United States African Command
- United States Army Europe and Africa (USAREUR-AF)
- United States Air Forces in Europe – Air Forces Africa (USAFE-AFAFRICA)
- Seventeenth Air Force
- Special Operations Command, Europe

=== Department of Defense Agencies ===
- Department of Defense Education Activity
- Defense Commissary Agency
- Defense Logistics Agency
- Defense Health Agency
- Army and Air Force Exchange Service
- Defense Intelligence Agency
- United States Army Installation Management Command, Europe
- Family and Morale, Welfare and Recreation Command
- Missile Defense Agency

=== Other governmental agencies ===
- United States Agency for International Development
- United States Department of Energy
- United States Customs and Border Protection
- United States Department of State
- Supreme Headquarters Allied Powers Europe (SHAPE)
- Bureau of International Narcotics and Law Enforcement Affairs
- Host Nation Governments (Germany, Belgium, etc.)

== Sample of Significant Programs ==
=== 1. U.S. Military Construction (MILCON) ===
The MILCON programs fund much of the Europe District's engineering and construction program. The programs provide much-needed improvements to both operational and quality-of-life infrastructure. In fiscal year 2010, the district plans to execute about $746 million in support of U.S. forces and other customers throughout Europe. Current major MILCON programs include:

==== * Rhine Ordnance Barracks Medical Center – ====
Europe District is working with the German construction administration, the Defense Health Agency, U.S. Army Garrison Rheinland-Pfalz and other partners to deliver the new Rhine Ordnance Barracks Medical Center being constructed in Weilerbach, Germany. Once complete, the new hospital will replace the nearby Landstuhl Regional Medical Center and the 86th Medical Group Clinic, providing service members and their families with modern, world-class healthcare facilities.

==== * USAG Bavaria Operational Readiness Training Complex (ORTC) – ====
Construction kicked off in 2023 on a $1.3 billion project in Grafenwoehr, Germany intended to include nearly 50 buildings and house more than 5,000 Soldiers. The first Operational Readiness Training Complex will be built over about 10 years and will include all the facilities needed for an entire brigade set of troops and equipment to train and operate on a rotational basis.

==== * Department of Defense Education Activity (DoDEA) – ====
Currently, Europe District's DoDEA MILCON program has 28 Projects including 26 schools and other facilities with 17 schools completed and counting as of fall 2024. This nearly $2 billion program replacing older schools and facilities across Germany and Belgium with modern, educational facilities for approximately 16,000 children affiliated with the U.S. and NATO militaries.

=== 2. NAU's Installation Support (ISB) Program ===
ISB offers technical and project management services on a reimbursable basis to supplement installation-engineering capabilities. Among the services available are:

• Project scope development
• Installation and Base Camp Master Planning, including comprehensive master plans, stationing and area development plans, and facility utilization surveys
• Project programming (DD 1391s) and Planning Charrettes
• Geographic Information Systems, including data collection, GIS map maintenance and conversion, and training
• Project Design, including full design for small projects with Life Cycle Project Management
• Job order contracts which provide pre-priced maintenance and repair (M&R) work items and delivery orders
• Indefinite-delivery-indefinite-quantity (IDIQ) Multiple Award Task Order (MATOC) contracts; allows flexibility for scope of work, design and funding/task orders.
• Energy Savings Performance Contract (ESPC)
• USACE Access Control Point Equipment Program (ACPEP)

=== 3. Environmental Support - ===
The Environmental Team performs tasks like conducting environmental baseline surveys, environmental reviews, identifying and disposing of contaminated materials and soils, providing remediation design, execution and management services, and natural and cultural resource management. The environmental program also supports the U.S. Army garrisons with their environmental operational, remediation, and base closure activities and provides support to 7th Army Training Command's Integrated Training Area Management program and the Defense Logistics Agency Energy's program throughout Europe.

=== 4. The U.S. Operations and Maintenance (O&M) – ===
O&M programs fund about a quarter of Europe District's engineering and construction team. These programs supplement the U.S. Army garrison installation engineers with the total resources, experience and expertise of the U.S. Army Corps of Engineers in their efforts to resolve O&M, and host nation engineering and construction issues. The district has made its services more accessible to the garrison Directorate of Public Works (DPW) customers by collocating Regional Program Managers (RPM) with nine U.S. Army Europe and U.S. Air Forces in Europe Installation Engineers. RPMs provide responsive support – from serving as an adjunct member of the DPW staff to helping coordinate with the district and helping prepare forms to justify major construction projects.

=== 5. Defense Commissary Agency and Army Air Force Exchange Service Projects – ===
The Europe District provides design and construction services to DeCA and AAFES across Europe. Future commissary construction is planned for the Ramstein, Wiesbaden, Ansbach and Stuttgart communities in Germany. The district recently turned over new commissaries at Chièvres Air Base, Belgium, and Grafenwoehr, Germany.

=== 7. Defense Security Cooperation – ===
Europe District supports EUCOM and AFRICOM theater security plans and all three pillars of U.S. foreign policy, including defense, diplomacy and development. This is done by executing a variety of projects across a large, geographic area. Typical projects range from construction of facilities for foreign militaries through Foreign Military Sales (FMS) to humanitarian assistance programs through partners like State Department and USAID.

=== 8. International Engineering – ===
The International Engineering Center (IEC) provides design and construction contracting services to U.S. government agencies in Europe and Africa for projects that are outside the above categories. Work ranges from traditional military engineering construction of facilities, roads and bridges, to renovating orphanages and building customs and border crossing stations. Major programs include:

• Exercise-related construction (ERC) – The IEC supports EUCOM's Theater Engagement Plan by coordinating and managing Exercise Related Construction throughout Eastern Europe and Africa • Georgia Border Security and Law Enforcement Program – The district supports the Department of Homeland Security with construction of customs and border crossing stations. Primary end users are the Georgia Border Guard and the Georgia Customs Department • International Narcotics and Law Enforcement (INL) Program – The IEC continues to assist INL with design and renovation of facilities for the Department of State such as police academies, forensics laboratories and pistol ranges • Civil-military operations – The IEC provides contracting services to the EUCOM and AFRICOM civil military operations programs to design and construct basic humanitarian projects, including improving potable water, renovating schools, orphanages, and hospitals, and building wells • Counter-Narcotics and Terrorism (CNT) Program – The district is currently working on several CNT projects in Europe worth about $4.1 million • Operation Enduring Freedom - Trans Sahara (OEF-TS) – OEF-TS is the U.S. military component of the Trans-Sahara Counter-Terrorism Initiative, a U.S. government program designed to help develop the internal security forces necessary to control borders and combat terrorism and other illegal activity. AFRICOM executes OEF-TS through a series of military-to-military engagements and exercises designed to strengthen the ability of regional governments to police the large expanses of remote terrain in the trans-Sahara. The IEC has supported projects on several facilities in Mali, Niger, and Chad. The IEC is utilizing the newly awarded Multiple Award Task Order Contract which provides the flexibility and responsiveness required by customers to meet late emerging requirements in a more timely manner.
