= Troy Galloway =

U.S. Army general

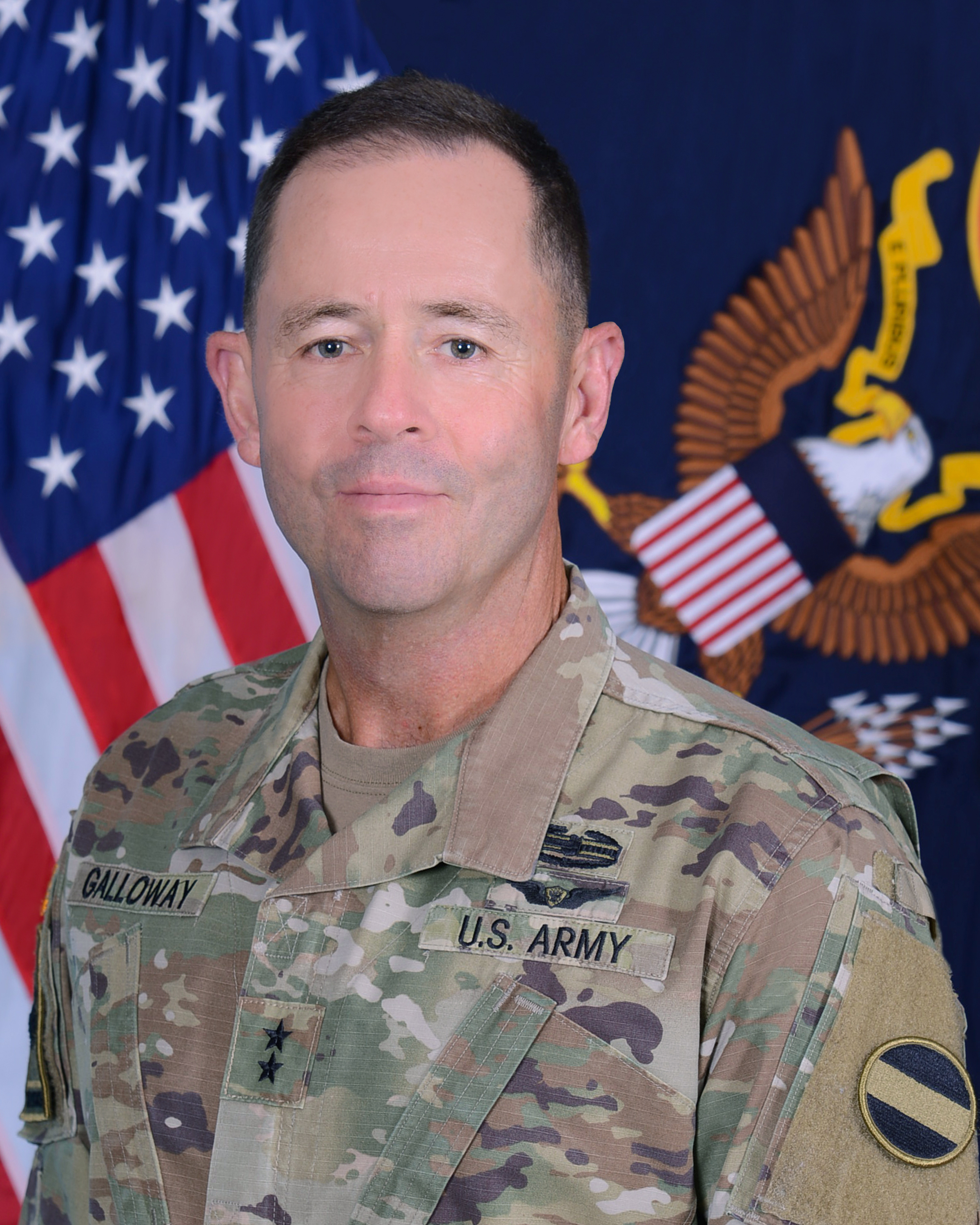
- Official portrait, 2021
- Military career
- Allegiance: United States
- Branch: United States Army
- Service years: 1990–2023
- Rank: Major General
- Commands: Fort Chaffee Maneuver Training Center; 142nd Field Artillery Brigade
- Conflicts: Iraq War
- Awards: Legion of Merit (2); Bronze Star Medal

Troy D. Galloway is a retired United States Army major general who last served as the Deputy Commanding General for the Army National Guard of the United States Army Forces Command from August 1, 2021, to May 1, 2023. He most recently served as the Deputy Commanding General for Operations of the First United States Army from May 1, 2019, to April 2021. Previously, he served as the Deputy Commanding General for the Army National Guard of the United States Army Combined Arms Center.

Galloway attended Missouri State University, where he participated in the Army Reserve Officers' Training Corps program and earned a Bachelor of Science degree in geography in 1991. He later received a Master of Arts degree in leadership and administration from the University of Oklahoma in 2009 and a Master of Strategic Studies degree from Army War College in 2011.

Military offices
Preceded by Scott L. Efflandt	Deputy Commanding General for the Army National Guard of the United States Army Combined Arms Center; 2016–2019	Succeeded by Jerry F. Prochaska
Preceded by Jeffrey H. Holmes	Deputy Commanding General for Operations of the First United States Army; 2019–2021	Succeeded by Mark C. Jackson
Preceded by Brian C. Harris	Deputy Commanding General for the Army National Guard of the United States Army Forces Command; 2021–2023	Succeeded by Richard F. Johnson
