= North Atlantic Division =

One of the eight permanent divisions of the U.S. Army Corps of Engineers

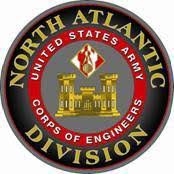
Division emblem

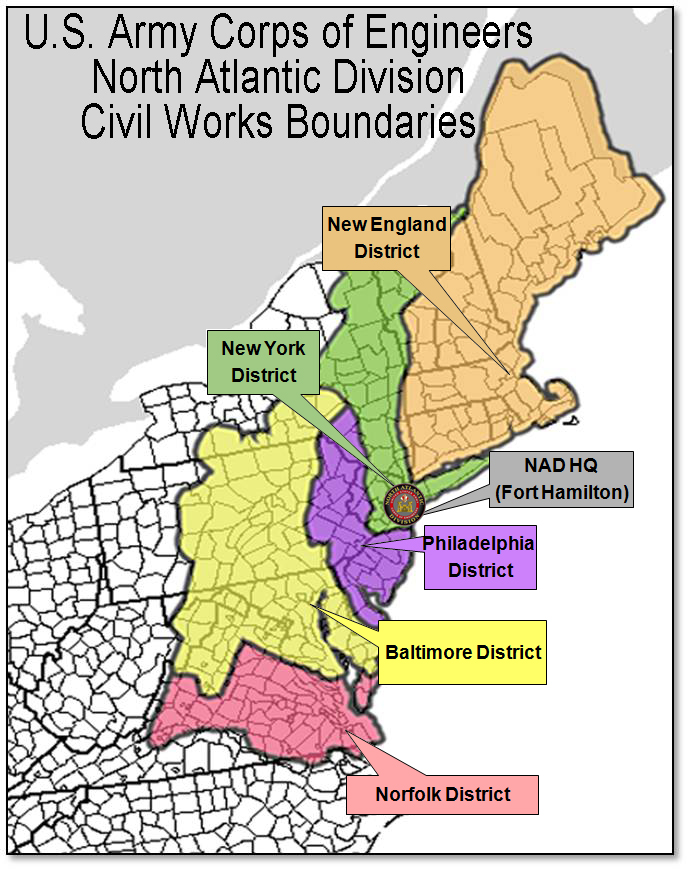
A map of the civil works (i.e., watershed) boundaries of the US Army Corps of Engineers North Atlantic Division

The North Atlantic Division of the U.S. Army Corps of Engineers is one of the nine permanent divisions within the Corps.

Made up of roughly 3,700 employees in six districts and a Division headquarters, the North Atlantic Division is a major subordinate command and serves to integrate the capabilities of its six districts. They plan, design and build for the Army and Air Force in the northeastern states and Europe, develop and manage water resources, and protect and restore the environment. They also work for other international, federal, state and local customers and agencies.

Division headquarters are at 302 John Warren Avenue in Fort Hamilton in Brooklyn, New York. The division is responsible for six subordinate engineer districts with headquarters in Concord, Massachusetts, New York City, Philadelphia, Baltimore, Norfolk and Wiesbaden, Germany.

Following the American Civil War, rapid increases in civil works construction requirements to support economic growth drove the Army Corps of Engineers to establish many new engineer districts to manage the work. The Corps' national headquarters needed an intermediate level of command and control to manage the districts, so it created several division headquarters including the Northeast Division based in New York City in November 1888.

The Corps of Engineers reorganized in 1929 to reduce division headquarters and merged the Eastern Division with the Northeast Division, forming the North Atlantic Division.

During World War II while working out of its headquarters at 270 Broadway in Manhattan, the division was responsible for coordinating all military construction in Europe. It also provided staff members and administrative support to the newly created Manhattan District's construction of nuclear bomb, which was code named the Manhattan Project because the district and division's offices being initially co-located.

The division commanding general is currently Col. Jesse T. Curry, who is directly responsible to the United States Army's Chief of Engineers. Within the authorities delegated, the division commander directs and supervises the individual district commanders. The division commander also serves as the federal representative on the Delaware River Basin Commission, Susquehanna River Basin Commission and the Interstate Commission on the Potomac River Basin.

== Engineer Districts ==
- New England
- New York
- Philadelphia, Pennsylvania
- Baltimore, Maryland
- Norfolk, Virginia
- U.S. Army Corps of Engineers, Europe District

== List of Commanders ==
- COL Jesse Curry, 2025 -
- BG John Lloyd, 2022 - 2025
- MG Thomas Tickner, 2020 - 2022
- MG Jeffrey Milhorn, 2018 – 2020
- MG William H. Graham, Jr. 2015 – 2018
- MG Kent D. Savre, 2012 – 2015
- BG Peter A. DeLuca, 2009 – 2011
- LTG Todd T. Semonite, 2006 – 2009
- LTG William T. Grisoli, 2005 – 2006
- MG Merdith W. B. Temple, 2002 – 2005
- BG M. Stephen Rhoades, 1999 – 2002
- LTG Jerry L. Sinn, 1997 – 1999
- MG Milton Hunter 1994 - 1997
- BG Paul Chinen, 1992-1994
- BG C Brown 1989-1992
- MG James W. van Loben Sels, 1988-1989
- MG Charles Williams, 1986-1988
- BG Paul F. Kavanaugh, 1984-1986
- BG Thomas Sands, 1981-1984
- MG Bennett L. Lewis, 1979-1981
- MG James Allen Johnson, 1977-1979
- MG James Kelly, 1974-1977
- MG Richard H. Groves, 1971-1974
- MG Charles M. Duke, 1968-1971
- BG Francis P. Koisch, 1966-1968
- LTG David Stuart Parker, 1965-1966
- BG John Dalrymple, 1962-1965
- BG Thomas H. Lipscomb, 1959-1962
- BG Clarence Renshaw, 1954-1959
- BG Benjamin B. Talley, 1952-1954
- COL Frederick Frech, 1950-1952
- BG George J. Nold, 1948-1949
- BG Beverly C. Dunn, 1946-1948
- COL Charles L. Hall, 1945-1946
- COL Albert H. Burton, 1944-1945
- BG John Neal Hodges, 1940-1944 [Deployed to North Africa 21 May 1942 – 22 Sep 1943]
- MG Francis Bowditch Wilby, 1938-1939
- COL Edmund L. Daley, 1937-1938
- MG Ernest Dichmann Peek, 1936-1937
- COL George R. Spalding, 1935-1936
- COL Gustave Lukesh, 1935-1935
- COL James A. Woodruff, 1934-1935
- COL George M. Hoffman, 1931-1934
- COL William J. Barden, 1928-1931 [During Barden's command, the Northeast Division was merged with the Eastern Division and renamed the North Atlantic Division, part of major reorganization of the U.S. Army Corps of Engineers early in the Herbert Hoover administration]

Northeast Division commanders

- COL Herbert Deakyne, 1925-1926
- COL William B. LaDue, 1924-1925 and 1926-1927
- COL Henry C. Newcomer, 1922-1924
- COL Eden Everett Winslow, 1921-1922
- COL James C. Sanford, 1920-1921
- BG William C. Langfitt, 1919-1920
- BG Theodore A. Bingham, 1917-1919
- BG William T. Rossell, 1917-1918
- COL Frederic Vaughan Abbot, 1913-1917
- MG William Murray Black, 1909-1913
- COL John G.D. Knight, 1907-1909
- COL Amos Stickney, 1906-1907
- COL Charles R. Sutter, 1901-1906
- COL G.L. Gillespie, 1897-1901
- BG John Moulder Wilson, 1895-1897
- BG Henry Larcom Abbot, 1888-1895

Eastern Division commanders

- MG Peter C. Hains, 1917-1918
