= Northwestern Division =

One of the eight permanent divisions of the U.S. Army Corps of Engineers

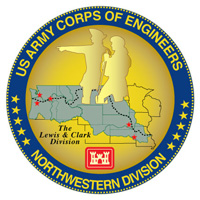
Division emblem

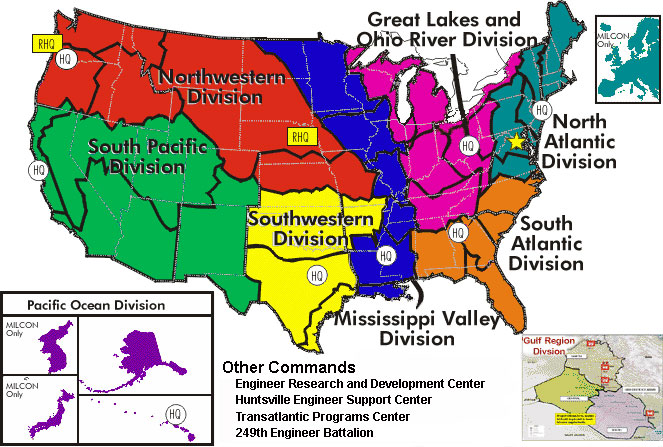
USACE Northwestern Division, shown in red

The United States Army Corps of Engineers Northwestern Division (NWD) is one of the eight permanent divisions of the Army organization, providing civil works and military water resource services/infrastructure. It also supports economically viable and environmentally sustainable watershed management and water resources development in its territory.

The Northwestern Division (NWD), located in Portland, Oregon, stretches from Canada to California, and from the Pacific Ocean across the northern Great Plains to Missouri. It covers nearly 1,000,000 square miles (2,600,000 km^{2}) in all or parts of 12 states: Washington, Oregon, Idaho, Montana, Wyoming, Colorado, North Dakota, South Dakota, Nebraska, Kansas, Iowa and Missouri. NWD has 35% of the total Corps water storage capacity, and produces 75% of the total Corps hydroelectric capacity.

The Division Commander is directly responsible to the Chief of Engineers. The NWD Commander directs and supervises the individual District Commanders.

NWD duties include:

- Preparing engineering studies and design.
- Constructing, operating, and maintaining flood control and river and harbor facilities and installations.
- Administering the laws on civil works activities.
- Acquiring, managing, and disposing of real estate.
- Mobilization support of military, natural disaster, and national emergency operations.

== Districts ==
The Division's five districts are headquartered in:

- Omaha, Nebraska
- Portland, Oregon
- Seattle, Washington
- Kansas City, Missouri
- Walla Walla, Washington
