= List of Medal of Honor recipients for World War I =

World War I (also known as the First World War and the Great War) was a global military conflict that embroiled most of the world's great powers, assembled in two opposing alliances: the Entente and the Central Powers. The immediate cause of the war was the June 28, 1914 assassination of Archduke Franz Ferdinand, heir to the Austro-Hungarian throne, by Gavrilo Princip, a Bosnian Serb citizen of Austria-Hungary and member of the Black Hand. The retaliation by Austria-Hungary against Serbia activated a series of alliances that set off a chain reaction of war declarations. Within a month, much of Europe was in a state of open warfare, resulting in the mobilization of more than 65 million European soldiers, and more than 40 million casualties—including approximately 20 million deaths by the end of the war.

When World War I broke out, the United States maintained a policy of isolationism, avoiding conflict while trying to negotiate peace between the warring nations. However, when a German U-boat sank the British liner Lusitania in 1915, with 128 Americans aboard, U.S. President Woodrow Wilson demanded an end to attacks on passenger ships. Germany complied and Wilson unsuccessfully tried to mediate a settlement. He repeatedly warned that the U.S. would not tolerate unrestricted submarine warfare, in violation of international law.

By the time the United States of America entered the war in 1917—three years after the first shots were fired—several Americans had already gone to fight as pilots by joining the Royal Flying Corps. These pilots reported to Canada, and after flight training were sent to fight as officers in the British military.

The Medal of Honor was created during the American Civil War and is the highest military decoration presented by the United States government to a member of its armed forces. The recipient must have distinguished themselves at the risk of their own life above and beyond the call of duty in action against an enemy of the United States. Due to the nature of this medal, it is commonly presented posthumously.

In all some 125 men received the Medal for their actions in World War I (34 of them posthumously): 92 from the Army, to include 4 from the Air Service, 21 from the Navy (including 10 who received the Medal for non-combat actions), and 8 from the Marine Corps. Among the recipients were Alvin York, who later became the basis for the movie Sergeant York, and Edward Rickenbacker, who became a flying ace. Ralph Talbot of the Marine Corps also became a flying ace and was the first Marine aviator to receive the Medal of Honor.

Since the Medal of Honor was established, 19 recipients have received it twice, of whom 5 received both awards during World War I. These 5 men were all Marines who received both the Army and Navy versions of the Medal of Honor for the same action. This was made possible by the practice of attaching some units of the U.S. Marine Corps, a part of the Department of the Navy, to larger U.S. Army commands, making marines in such units eligible for both Army and Navy decorations. Of the other three marines who earned the Medal of Honor during World War I, two were awarded only the Navy version and one, Fred W. Stockham, received only the Army version. In February 1919, the criteria for the award were amended to state that no person could receive more than one Medal of Honor for the same action, thus precluding any future double recipients.

== Recipients ==
This color indicates that the Medal of Honor was awarded posthumously. The addition of the † symbol means that the recipient was killed in action or died during the war.

Image	Name	Service	Rank	Place of action	Date of action	Notes
	Joseph B. Adkison	Army	Sergeant	near Bellicourt, France	Sep 29, 1918	Single-handedly attacked and captured a machine gun position
Head and shoulders of a man in a neatly pressed military uniform with four medals hanging from ribbons on his chest and a garrison cap.	Jake Allex	Army	Corporal	Chipilly Ridge, France	Aug 9, 1918	Took command of his platoon after all officers had been killed or wounded and single-handedly captured a machine gun nest
Head and shoulders of an officer in a neatly pressed military uniform with medals hanging from ribbons on his chest and a service cap.	Edward C. Allworth	Army	Captain	Cléry-le-Petit, France	Nov 5, 1918	Swam across a canal under fire, encouraging his men to follow, then led his unit in the capture of 100 prisoners
	Johannes S. Anderson	Army	First Sergeant	Consenvoye, France	Oct 8, 1918	Single-handedly attacked and captured a machine gun nest
	Albert E. Baesel †	Army	Second Lieutenant	near Ivoiry, France	Sep 27, 1918	Killed while trying to rescue a wounded soldier under heavy fire
Head and shoulders of man in his forties, wearing glasses and a World War II style U.S. naval officer's uniform	John H. Balch	Navy	Pharmacist's Mate First Class	Vierzy and Somme-Py, France	Jul 19, 1918 and Oct 5, 1918	Exposed himself to intense fire in order to treat the wounded and establish a dressing station
	Charles D. Barger	Army	Private First Class	near Bois-de-Bantheville, France	Oct 31, 1918	With Jesse N. Funk, entered no man's land and rescued two wounded officers
Face of a young man in military uniform. He has a stern expression and his hat, a peaked cap, is slightly cocked.	David B. Barkley †	Army	Private	near Pouilly-sur-Meuse, France	Nov 9, 1918	Swam the Meuse River and reconnoitered German positions under heavy fire, drowned on the return trip
	John L. Barkley	Army	Private First Class	near Cunel, France	Oct 7, 1918	Manned a machine gun inside a disabled tank and single-handedly repelled two German counterattacks
	Frank J. Bart	Army	Private	near Medeah Ferme, France	Oct 3, 1918	Single-handedly attacked and silenced two machine gun nests
	Robert L. Blackwell †	Army	Private	near Saint-Souplet, France	Oct 11, 1918	Killed while trying to carry a message calling for reinforcements through heavy fire
Erwin R. Bleckley	Erwin R. Bleckley †	Air Service	Second Lieutenant	near Binarville, France	Oct 6, 1918	Killed while trying to supply the Lost Battalion by air with Harold Goettler
	Joel T. Boone	Navy	Lieutenant	near Vierzy, France	Jul 19, 1918	Exposed himself to intense fire in order to treat the wounded and bring in supplies
	Willis Winter Bradley, Jr.	Navy	Lieutenant	USS Pittsburgh en route to Buenos Aires, Argentina	Jul 23, 1917	Entered a room containing explosives and extinguished a fire after an accidental detonation
Head and shoulders of a middle-aged white man in a suit and striped tie.	Deming Bronson	Army	First Lieutenant	near Eclisfontaine, France	Sep 26, 1918 – Sep 27, 1918	Continued to fight although suffering from severe wounds
	Donald M. Call	Army	Corporal	near Varennes, France	Sep 26, 1918	Rescued a wounded officer from a disabled tank and carried him to safety under intense fire
Head of a young man with full cheeks wearing a military peaked cap and looking off into the distance.	Tedford H. Cann	Navy	Seaman	USS May	Nov 5, 1917	Dove into a flooded compartment to find and plug a leak which threatened his ship
	Marcellus H. Chiles †	Army	Captain	near Le Champy Bas, France	Nov 3, 1918	Led from the front despite intense machine gun fire until being mortally wounded
	Wilbur E. Colyer †	Army	Sergeant	near Verdun, France	Oct 9, 1918	Single-handedly attacked and silenced three machine gun nests
	Henry G. Costin †	Army	Private	near Bois-de-Consenvoye, France	Oct 8, 1918	Mortally wounded while attacking a machine gun nest alone after everyone else in his team had become casualties
	Jesse W. Covington	Navy	Ship's Cook Third class	USS Stewart	Apr 17, 1918	Dove overboard and rescued a man who was surrounded by boxes of explosives
Head and torso of a man with neatly combed hair and a toothbrush mustache. He is wearing a dressy military uniform with an array of medals on his chest, a medal tightly around his neck, and shoulder cords.	Louis Cukela	Marine Corps	Sergeant	near Villers-Cotterêts, France	Jul 18, 1918	Single-handedly attacked and captured a German strongpoint (Note: Received both the Army and Navy versions of the Medal of Honor for the same action; one of nineteen people to receive two Medals of Honor)
	George Dilboy †	Army	Private First Class	near Belleau, France	Jul 18, 1918	Mortally wounded while single-handedly attacking and silencing a machine gun position
Three-quarters shot of a middle-aged man in a plain military uniform, standing almost at attention. He is wearing a campaign hat and two medals on his chest.	Michael A. Donaldson	Army	Sergeant	Sommerance-Landres-et-Saint-Georges Road, France	Oct 14, 1918	Rescued six wounded men despite intense fire
	William J. Donovan	Army	Lieutenant Colonel	near Landres-et-Saint-Georges, France	Oct 14, 1918 – Oct 15, 1918	Exposed himself to fire in order to lead and organize his men, remained with them after being wounded. The only person to have received the four highest awards in the United States: the Medal of Honor, the Distinguished Service Cross, the Distinguished Service Medal, and the National Security Medal.
	James C. Dozier	Army	First Lieutenant	near Montbrehain, France	Oct 8, 1918	Continued to lead after being wounded and, with another soldier, silenced a machine gun nest
	Parker F. Dunn †	Army	Private First Class	near Grandpré, Ardennes, France	Oct 23, 1918	Killed while carrying a message through intense fire
	Daniel R. Edwards	Army	Private First Class	Soissons, France	Jul 18, 1918	Although severely injured, single-handedly entered a German trench and killed or captured the occupants
	Alan L. Eggers	Army	Sergeant	near Le Catelet, France	Sep 29, 1918	With J.C. Latham and Thomas E. O'Shea, rescued the crew of a disabled tank and protected them from attack all day
	Michael B. Ellis	Army	Sergeant	near Exermont, France	Oct 5, 1918	Single-handedly attacked and captured several German positions
	Arthur J. Forrest	Army	Sergeant	near Remonville, France	Nov 1, 1918	Single-handedly attacked and silenced a machine gun nest
	Gary E. Foster	Army	Sergeant	near Montbrehain, France	Oct 8, 1918	Single-handedly silenced a machine gun nest
Head of a young man in military uniform with a garrison cap and round "US" pins on either side of his high, stiff collar.	Jesse N. Funk	Army	Private First Class	near Bois-de-Bantheville, France	Oct 31, 1918	With Charles D. Barger, entered no man's land and rescued two wounded officers
	Harold A. Furlong	Army	First Lieutenant	near Bantheville, France	Nov 1, 1918	Single-handedly attacked and silenced a series of machine gun nests
	Frank J. Gaffney	Army	Private First Class	near Ronssoy, France	Sep 29, 1918	Single-handedly captured and held a German position until reinforcements arrived
	Harold E. Goettler †	Air Service	First Lieutenant	near Binarville, France	Oct 6, 1918	Killed while trying to supply the Lost Battalion by air with Erwin Bleckley
	Ora Graves	Navy	Seaman	USS Pittsburgh en route to Buenos Aires, Argentina	Jul 23, 1917	Extinguished a fire after an accidental explosion
	Earle D. Gregory	Army	Sergeant	north of Verdun, France	Oct 8, 1918	Single-handedly attacked and captured three German positions
	Sydney G. Gumpertz	Army	First Sergeant	Bois de Forges, France	Sep 29, 1918	Single-handedly silenced a machine gun nest
—	Thomas L. Hall †	Army	Sergeant	near Montbrehain, France	Oct 8, 1918	Single-handedly attacked and silenced a machine gun nest, killed while attacking a second
Head of a young man in military uniform with shoulder straps, a high, stiff, collar, and a cap.	Charles H. Hammann	Naval Reserve	Ensign	off Pula, Austria-Hungary	Aug 21, 1918	Rescued a fellow pilot who had been shot down
	M. Waldo Hatler	Army	Sergeant	near Pouilly-sur-Meuse, France	Nov 8, 1918	Swam the Meuse River and reconnoitered German positions under heavy fire
A black and white headshot of Hayden in his military dress uniform without a hat and smiling.	David E. Hayden	Navy	Hospital Apprentice First Class	Thiaucourt, France	Sep 15, 1918	Reached a wounded man, treated him, and carried him to safety despite intense fire
	George P. Hays	Army	First Lieutenant	near Greves Farm, France	Jul 14, 1918 – Jul 15, 1918	Carried messages through heavy fire
	James D. Heriot †	Army	Corporal	Vaux-Andigny, France	Oct 12, 1918	Single-handedly attacked and captured a machine gun nest, killed while attacking a second
	Ralyn M. Hill	Army	Corporal	near Donnevoux, France	Oct 7, 1918	Ran through heavy fire to rescue a downed French pilot
	Richmond H. Hilton	Army	Sergeant	Brancourt, France	Oct 11, 1918	Led an attack which successfully captured a machine gun nest
	Nelson M. Holderman	Army	Captain	northeast of Binarville, France	Oct 2, 1918 – Oct 8, 1918	As part of the Lost Battalion, continued to lead despite being repeatedly wounded and rescued two wounded men from under intense fire
	Osmond K. Ingram †	Navy	Gunner's Mate First Class	USS Cassin, off the coast of Ireland	Oct 15, 1917	Killed while attempting to release depth charges in the face of an oncoming torpedo
Head and shoulders of a young white man with a cleft chin and neatly combed hair parted at the side. He is wearing a dark, heavy, pea coat with military shoulder straps.	Edouard V. M. Izac	Navy	Lieutenant	German submarine U-90	May 21, 1918	Gathered intelligence while a prisoner of war, escaped and brought the information to the Allies
	Ernest A. Janson	Marine Corps	Gunnery Sergeant	near Château-Thierry, France	Jun 6, 1918	Single-handedly attacked and dispersed a machine gun detachment (Note: Served under the name Charles F. Hoffman)
	Harold I. Johnston	Army	Private First Class	near Pouilly-sur-Meuse, France	Nov 9, 1918	Swam the Meuse River and reconnoitered German positions under heavy fire
	Henry Johnson	Army	Sergeant	near Argonne Forest, France	May 14, 1918	Repelled a 24-man German raiding party; suffered 21 wounds. Medal awarded posthumously in 2015.
	James E. Karnes	Army	Sergeant	near Estrées, France	Oct 8, 1918	With Calvin Ward, attacked and captured a machine gun nest
	Phillip C. Katz	Army	Sergeant	near Eclisfontaine, France	Sep 26, 1918	Rescued a wounded man from under heavy fire
	Benjamin Kaufman	Army	First Sergeant	Forest of Argonne, France	Oct 4, 1918	Although wounded, single-handedly attacked and captured a machine gun
	John J. Kelly	Marine Corps	Private	Blanc Mont Ridge, France	Oct 3, 1918	Single-handedly attacked a machine gun nest under an artillery barrage
Head of a young man with thick, dark, hair parted at the side. He is wearing a military jacket with a high collar and bright buttons down the center.	Matej Kocak †	Marine Corps	Sergeant	south of Soissons, France	Jul 18, 1918	Single-handedly silenced a machine gun nest and led a successful attack on a second nest
published headshot	John C. Latham	Army	Sergeant	near Le Catelet, France	Sep 29, 1918	With Alan L. Eggers and Thomas E. O'Shea, rescued the crew of a disabled tank and protected them from attack all day
	Milo Lemert †	Army	First Sergeant	near Bellicourt, France	Sep 29, 1918	Single-handedly silenced three machine guns, killed while attacking a fourth with another man
	Berger Loman	Army	Private	near Consenvoye, France	Oct 9, 1918	Single-handedly attacked and captured a machine gun
Head and torso of a white man with short, light, hair and a stern look on his face. His arms are crossed and he is wearing a military uniform with a strap across the chest, a high stiff collar, and a winged badge on his left breast. Behind him can be seen part of a biplane.	Frank Luke, Jr. †	Air Service	Second Lieutenant	near Murvaux, France	Sep 29, 1918	Destroyed three observation balloons before being forced to land because of mortal wounds
	Alexander G. Lyle	Navy	Lieutenant Commander	France	Apr 23, 1918	Exposed himself to hostile fire to treat a wounded man
Head and shoulders of a man wearing a military jacket with a tie and high-collared white shirt underneath. A medal hangs from around his neck and his hat, a peaked cap, bears an anchor-shaped emblem with the letters "USN".	John MacKenzie	Navy	Chief Boatswain's Mate	USS Remlik (SP-157) in the Bay of Biscay	Dec 17, 1917	Secured a live depth charge
Head and torso of a man in a dressy military uniform, with white gloves, stripes on his sleeve near the wrist, emblems on his collar, a decorated peaked cap, and a sword held loosely in his hand.	James J. Madison	Naval Reserve	Lieutenant Commander	USS Ticonderoga	Sep 30, 1918	Continued to lead his ship after being severely wounded during a U-boat attack
	George H. Mallon	Army	Captain	Bois de Forges, France	Sep 26, 1918	Led a small group in the capture of a series of German positions
	Sidney E. Manning	Army	Corporal	near Breuvannes, France	Jul 28, 1918	Took command of his platoon and, although repeatedly wounded, led his men forward
	Patrick McGunigal	Navy	Shipfitter First class	USS Huntington	Sep 17, 1917	Rescued the pilot of a crashed observation balloon
	George G. McMurtry	Army	Captain	Charlevaux, France	Oct 2, 1918 – Oct 8, 1918	As part of the Lost Battalion, continued to lead and encourage his men despite being repeatedly wounded
	James I. Mestrovitch †	Army	Sergeant	Fismette, France	Aug 10, 1918	Rescued a wounded officer from under heavy fire
—	L. Wardlaw Miles	Army	Captain	near Revillon, France	Sep 14, 1918	Led an attack against a German trench and continued to lead after being severely wounded
	Oscar F. Miller †	Army	Major	near Gesnes, France	Sep 28, 1918	Continued to lead an attack despite being repeatedly wounded, later died of his wounds
—	Sterling L. Morelock	Army	Private	near Exermont, France	Oct 4, 1918	Led a small group in capturing a series of machine gun nests and then treated the wounded
	Thomas C. Neibaur	Army	Private	near Landres-et-Saint-Georges, France	Oct 16, 1918	Although wounded and cut off from his unit, helped hold off a German counterattack
	Richard W. O'Neill	Army	Sergeant	on the Ourcq River, France	Jul 30, 1918	Continued to lead an attack despite being repeatedly wounded
	Francis E. Ormsbee, Jr.	Navy	Chief Machinist's Mate	near the Naval Air Station, Pensacola, Florida	Sep 25, 1918	Rescued the gunner of a downed plane, tried unsuccessfully to rescue the pilot
Head of a young man with carefully combed hair wearing a dark military tunic with an oak leaf emblem and bar on the upright collar.	Weedon E. Osborne †	Navy	Lieutenant, Junior Grade	Bouresches, France	Jun 6, 1918	Killed while rescuing wounded men from under heavy fire
	Thomas E. O'Shea †	Army	Corporal	near Le Catelet, France	Sep 29, 1918	Killed while attempting to rescue the crew of a disabled tank along with J.C. Latham and Alan L. Eggers
	Samuel I. Parker	Army	Second Lieutenant	near Soissons, France	Jul 18, 1918 – Jul 19, 1918	Led an attack which captured a German strong point, continued to lead after being wounded
	Archie A. Peck	Army	Private	Forest of Argonne, France	Oct 6, 1918	Rescued two wounded men from under heavy fire
	Michael J. Perkins †	Army	Private First Class	Belleu Bois, France	Oct 27, 1918	Single-handedly attacked and captured a pillbox
	Orlando H. Petty	Naval Reserve	Lieutenant	Bois-de-Belleau, France	Jun 11, 1918	Tended the wounded despite artillery and gas attacks, even after his gas mask was rendered useless
Head of a young man with neatly combed and parted hair wearing a military cadet's jacket, with cords running horizontally across the chest and a high, stiff collar.	Emory Jenison Pike †	Army	Lieutenant Colonel	near Vandières, France	Sep 15, 1918	Continued to lead after being mortally wounded while aiding an injured soldier
Head and shoulders of a clean cut man in military uniform with four medals hanging from ribbons on his chest and a garrison cap.	Thomas A. Pope	Army	Corporal	Hamel, France	Jul 4, 1918	Single-handedly attacked and silenced a machine gun nest
Head and shoulders of a square-jawed young man with short, light, hair, which stands straight up in the front. He is wearing a military jacket with breast pockets and a row of buttons down the center.	John H. Pruitt †	Marine Corps	Corporal	Blanc Mont Ridge, France	Oct 3, 1918	Single-handedly captured two machine guns and forty prisoners
	Patrick Regan	Army	Second Lieutenant	Bois-de-Consenvoye, France	Oct 8, 1918	Led his platoon in the capture of a machine gun nest and continued to lead after being wounded
Head and torso of a man turned in his chair, his right arm lying stiffly on the arm rest in front of him. He is wearing a military uniform with a strap diagonally across the chest, a winged emblem on his left breast, and a garrison cap.	Edward V. Rickenbacker	Air Service	First Lieutenant	near Billy-sous-les-Côtes, France	Sep 25, 1918	Attacked seven German planes, shooting down two
	George S. Robb	Army	First Lieutenant	near Séchault, France	Sep 29, 1918 – Sep 30, 1918	Continued to lead despite being repeatedly wounded
	Harold W. Roberts †	Army	Corporal	Montrebeau Woods, France	Oct 4, 1918	Drowned after pushing another man to safety when their tank fell into a water-filled shell hole
	Robert G. Robinson	Marine Corps	Gunnery Sergeant	over Pittem, Belgium	Oct 8, 1918 and Oct 14, 1918	Continued to fire his weapon after being severely wounded in an aerial battle against twelve German planes
	Samuel M. Sampler	Army	Corporal	near Saint-Étienne-à-Arnes, France	Oct 8, 1918	Single-handedly attacked and silenced a machine gun nest
	Willie Sandlin	Army	Sergeant	Bois de Forges, France	Sep 26, 1918	Single-handedly attacked three machine gun nests
	William Sawelson †	Army	Sergeant	Grandpré, Ardennes, France	Oct 26, 1918	Killed while aiding a wounded man under heavy fire
—	Dwite H. Schaffner	Army	First Lieutenant	near St. Hubert's Pavilion, Boureuilles, France	Sep 28, 1918	Led his men in a defense against German counterattacks, personally captured a German officer and extracted information from him
Head of a man wearing a dark jacket and tie and a peaked cap with an anchor and "USN" emblem on the front.	Oscar Schmidt, Jr.	Navy	Chief Gunner's Mate	USS Chestnut Hill	Oct 9, 1918	Rescued a wounded man from the water and attempted to rescue another
	Lloyd M. Seibert	Army	Sergeant	near Épinonville, France	Sep 26, 1918	Although ill, led his men in an attack on a machine gun and continued to lead after being wounded
Portrait of Shemin	William Shemin	Army	Sergeant	Vesle River, southeast of Bazoches, France	Aug 7, 1918 – Aug 9, 1918	Rescued the wounded from under heavy fire and took command of his platoon after his superiors became casualties. Medal awarded posthumously in 2015.
—	John O. Siegel	Navy	Boatswain's Mate Second Class	Mohawk (YT-17)	Nov 1, 1918	Rescued two men from a burning vessel before being trapped and collapsing from the smoke
	Alexander R. Skinker †	Army	Captain	Cheppy, France	Sep 26, 1918	Killed while leading two other men in an attack on German pillboxes
Head and shoulders of a young man in a military uniform with an array of medals on his chest and a garrison cap with a "US" button.	Clayton K. Slack	Army	Private	near Consenvoye, France	Oct 8, 1918	Single-handedly attacked and captured a group of German soldiers
	Fred E. Smith †	Army	Lieutenant Colonel	near Binarville, France	Sep 29, 1918	Drew German fire onto himself so his men could find cover, retrieved a supply of grenades and was mortally wounded while planning a counterattack
	Fred W. Stockham †	Marine Corps	Gunnery Sergeant	Bois-de-Belleau, France	June 13, 1918 – Jun 14, 1918	Gave his gas mask to a wounded comrade, later died of poison gas exposure
—	Freddie Stowers †	Army	Corporal	near Ardeuil-et-Montfauxelles, France	Sep 28, 1918	Led an attack on German positions and continued to lead after being mortally wounded
A seated man, his hands folded and resting on his knee, in military uniform with stripes on his sleeve near the wrist, oak leaf and anchor emblems on his collar, and a peaked cap.	Daniel A. J. Sullivan	Naval Reserve	Ensign	USS Christabel	May 21, 1918	Secured a group of live depth charges
Head of a young, dark-haired man in a white military coat with bright buttons and an emblem on the collar.	Ralph Talbot †	Marine Corps	Second Lieutenant	over Pittem, Belgium	Oct 8, 1918 and Oct 14, 1918	With gunner Robert G. Robinson, shot down one plane in an aerial battle against twelve German aircraft
	Edward R. Talley	Army	Sergeant	near Ponchaux, France	Oct 7, 1918	Single-handedly attacked and silenced a machine gun
Head and shoulders of a middle-aged man, with receding hairline, in a dark turtleneck sweater.	Joseph H. Thompson	Army	Major	near Apremont, France	Oct 1, 1918	Guided a tank towards a German machine gun nest on foot, despite intense fire
	Harold L. Turner	Army	Corporal	near Saint-Étienne-à-Arnes, France	Oct 8, 1918	Single-handedly attacked and captured a German strong point
	William B. Turner †	Army	First Lieutenant	near Ronssoy, France	Sep 27, 1918	Killed while leading his men in a series of attacks despite being wounded
—	Frank M. Upton	Navy	Ensign	USS Stewart	Apr 17, 1918	Dove overboard and rescued a man who was surrounded by boxes of explosives
	Michael Valente	Army	Private	east of Ronssoy, France	Sep 29, 1918	With another man, silenced two machine gun nests and attacked a German trench
Three-quarters frontal picture of a man in uniform wearing a metal helmet with 2nd Infantry Division insignia. The Medal of Honor, French Croix de guerre with two bronze palms and one silver star and Montenegrin Medal for Military Bravery are pinned to his uniform coat.	Ludovicus M. M. Van Iersel	Army	Sergeant	Mouzon, France	Nov 9, 1918	Under heavy fire, reconnoitered a damaged bridge and swam the river to investigate German positions
	John C. Villepigue	Army	Corporal	Vaux-Andigny, France	Oct 15, 1918	Single-handedly attacked a dugout and captured a machine gun nest
	Reidar Waaler	Army	Sergeant	near Ronssoy, France	Sep 27, 1918	Rescued two men from a burning tank under heavy fire
	Calvin J. Ward	Army	Private	near Estrées, France	Oct 8, 1918	With James Karnes, attacked and captured a machine gun nest
—	Chester H. West	Army	First Sergeant	near Bois de Cheppy, France	Sep 26, 1918	Single-handedly attacked a machine gun nest
	Charles W. Whittlesey	Army	Major	northeast of Binarville, France	Oct 2, 1918 – Oct 7, 1918	As commander of the Lost Battalion, led his unit in holding their position and refused to surrender
	J. Hunter Wickersham †	Army	Second Lieutenant	near Limey, France	Sep 12, 1918	Continued to lead and fight after being mortally wounded
	Nels Wold †	Army	Private	near Cheppy, France	Sep 26, 1918	With another soldier, silenced four machine gun nests, killed while attacking a fifth
	Samuel Woodfill	Army	First Lieutenant	Cunel, France	Oct 12, 1918	Supported by his company, attacked and silenced three machine gun nests
Head and shoulders of a man in military uniform with combed back hair and a neatly trimmed mustache. Three medals hang from ribbons on his chest.	Alvin C. York	Army	Corporal	near Chatel-Chéhéry, France	Oct 8, 1918	Took command of his platoon and led an attack on a machine gun nest

== See also ==
- The British Unknown Warrior from World War I
- The American Unknown Soldier from World War I
