= Sidney E. Manning =

American soldier and Medal of Honor recipient

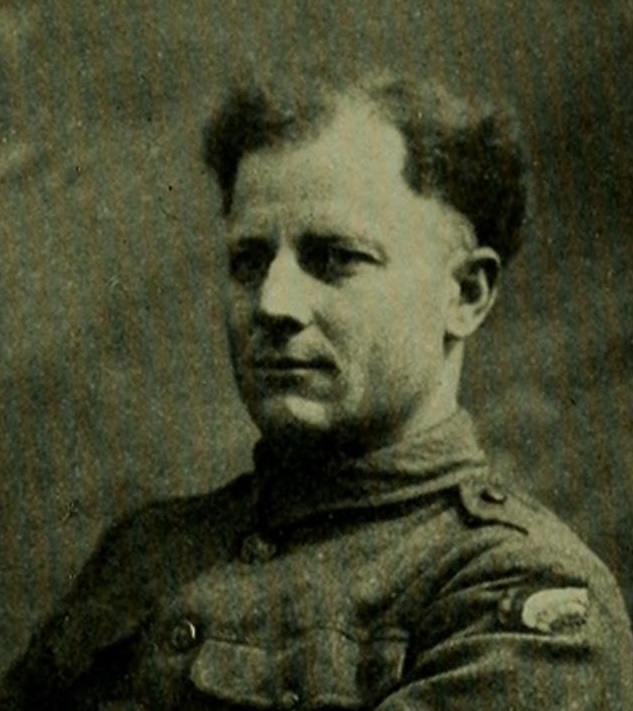
- From 1919's Alabama's Own in France. Closeup portion of original.
- Born: July 17, 1892; Butler County, Alabama, U.S.
- Died: December 15, 1960 (aged 68); Montgomery, Alabama, U.S.
- Burial place: Little Escambia Cemetery Flomaton, Alabama, U.S.
- Military career
- Branch: United States Army
- Service years: 1917–1919
- Rank: Corporal
- Service number: 97184
- Units: Company G, 167th Infantry, 42d Division
- Conflicts: World War I
- Awards: Medal of Honor; Purple Heart
- Other work: Farmer

Sidney Earnest Manning (July 17, 1892 – December 15, 1960) was a soldier in the United States Army who received the Medal of Honor for his actions during World War I.

== Early life ==
Manning was born in Butler County, Alabama on July 17, 1892, the son of Barney Austin Manning and Sarah Elizabeth (Vickery) Manning. Manning's siblings included three brothers and a sister. He was raised on a farm in Flomaton, Alabama, and educated in Flomaton. When he registered for the World War I draft in June 1917, Manning stated that farming was his occupation. When he joined the military, he was assigned to the Alabama National Guard's Company G, 4th Alabama Infantry. In August, the 4th Alabama entered federal service as the 167th Infantry Regiment, a unit of the 42nd Division.

== World War I ==
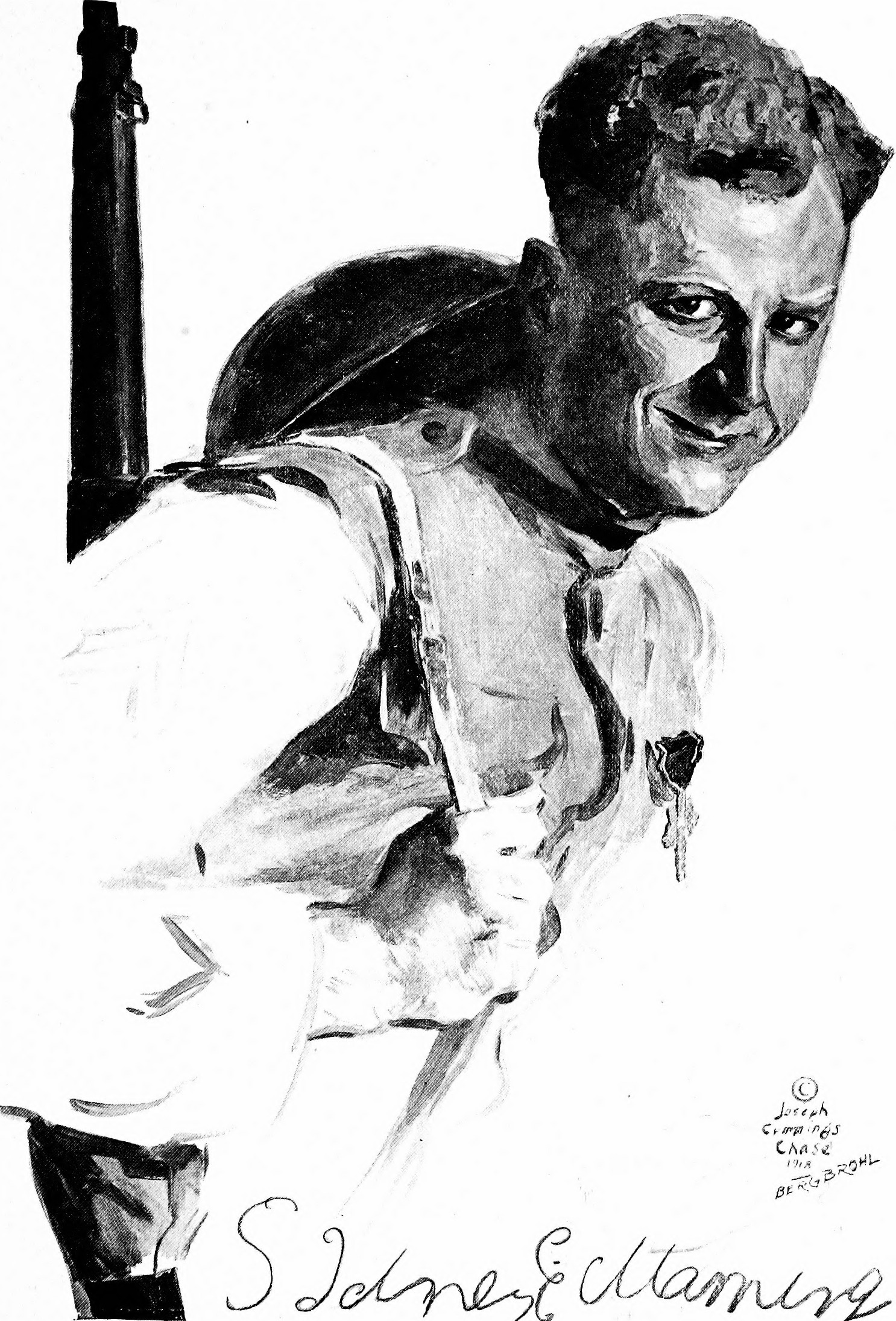
Manning as depicted in 1920's Soldiers All; Portraits and Sketches of the Men of the A. E. F.

Manning served with the 167th during combat in France and was promoted to corporal. He took part in combat at La Croix Rouge Farm and Ourcq River. During the Ourcq River attack, the officers and higher-ranking noncommissioned officers in Manning's 35-man automatic rifle platoon were killed or wounded. Manning took command, regrouped his platoon's remaining soldiers, and organized them into a defense. Manning was wounded nine times while providing automatic rifle fire to cover the movement of his soldiers, and his efforts enabled the platoon to deny their position to the counterattacking Germans until they could be consolidated with adjacent units. His platoon accomplished its mission, while all but seven of his soldiers were killed or wounded.

In January 1919, Manning received the Distinguished Service Cross to recognize his wartime heroism. In March 1919, this award was upgraded to the Medal of Honor, which was presented by John J. Pershing. In addition to the Medal of Honor, Manning's awards and decorations included the Purple Heart, French Croix de Guerre and Médaille militaire, Italian Croce al Merito di Guerra, and the Medalja za Hrabrost (Medal for Bravery) from Montenegro.

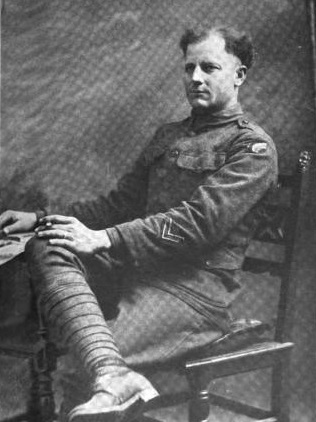
From 1919's Alabama's Own in France

After his wartime service and participation in the post-war occupation of Germany, Manning returned to Flomaton in 1919. The town intended to welcome Manning with a public celebration at the local train station, which Manning reportedly avoided by leaving the train early. After his discharge from the army, he participated in an agricultural training program in Greensboro, Alabama, but was denied participation in a similar program in Mississippi because of his wartime wounds.

== Later life ==
In 1921, Manning accepted a U.S. government invitation to attend the inaugural Veterans Day wreath laying at the Tomb of the Unknown Soldier in Washington, D.C. In 1935, the Alabama legislature enacted legislation that provided financial support to Manning for the purchase of a farm and equipment to operate it. Manning never fully recovered from his wounds; in addition to receiving a disability pension, the condition of his health required him to frequently visit Veterans Administration hospitals for treatment and evaluation. His health continued to decline, and in his later years, Manning was completely bedridden.

Manning died in Montgomery, Alabama on December 15, 1960. He was buried at Little Escambia Cemetery in Flomaton.

== Memorials ==
In 1976, the town of Flomaton dedicated a granite memorial in Manning's honor. Originally placed at Lion's Park, it was later moved to the Flomaton Welcome Center. The welcome center is located on Sidney E. Manning Boulevard, which is also named for Manning. In 1962, a plaque honoring Manning was placed at the Alabama Department of Archives and History in Montgomery.

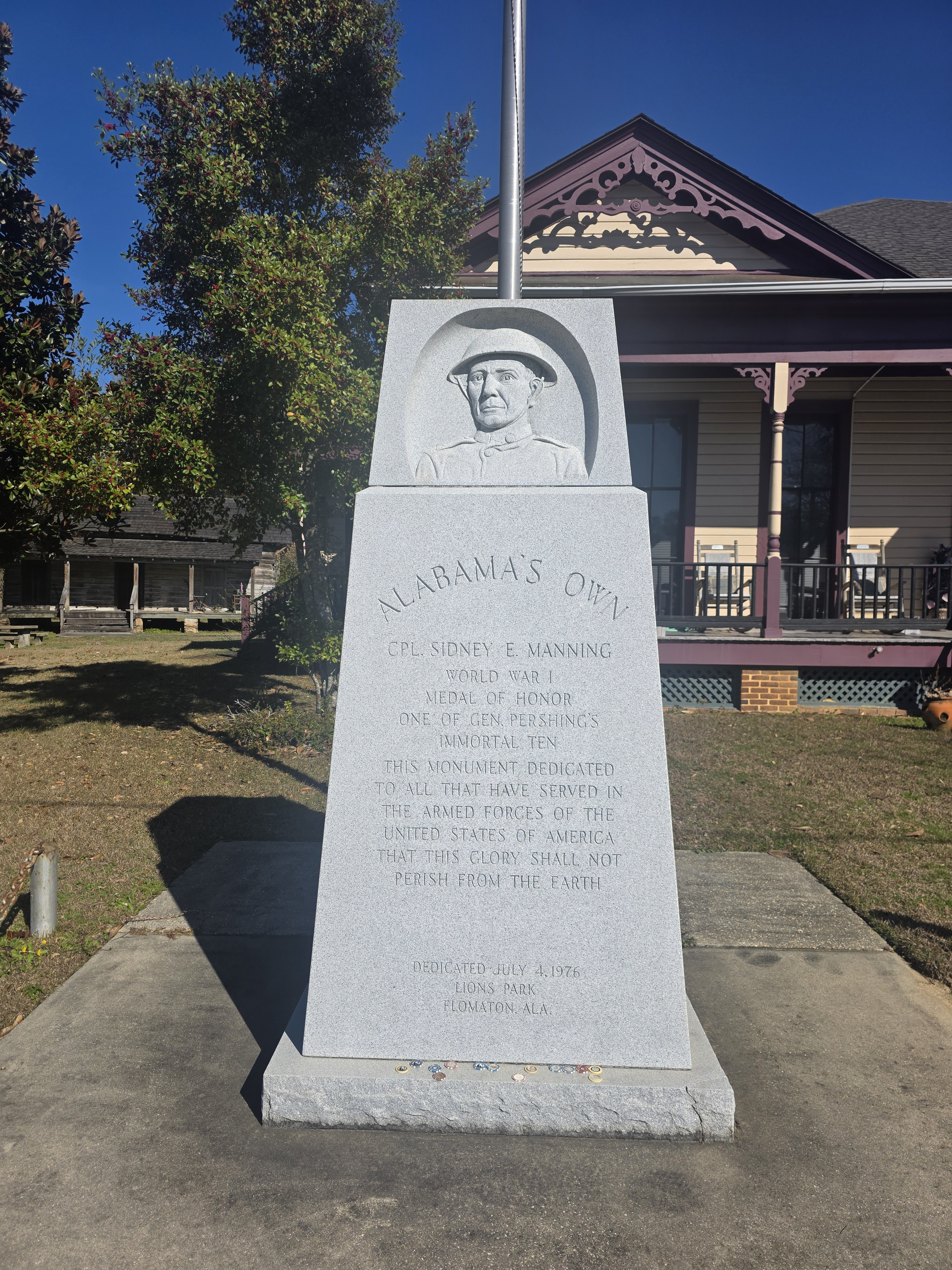
Sidney E Manning Memorial in front of the Welcome Center Railroad Museum Flomaton Alabama (Close Up)

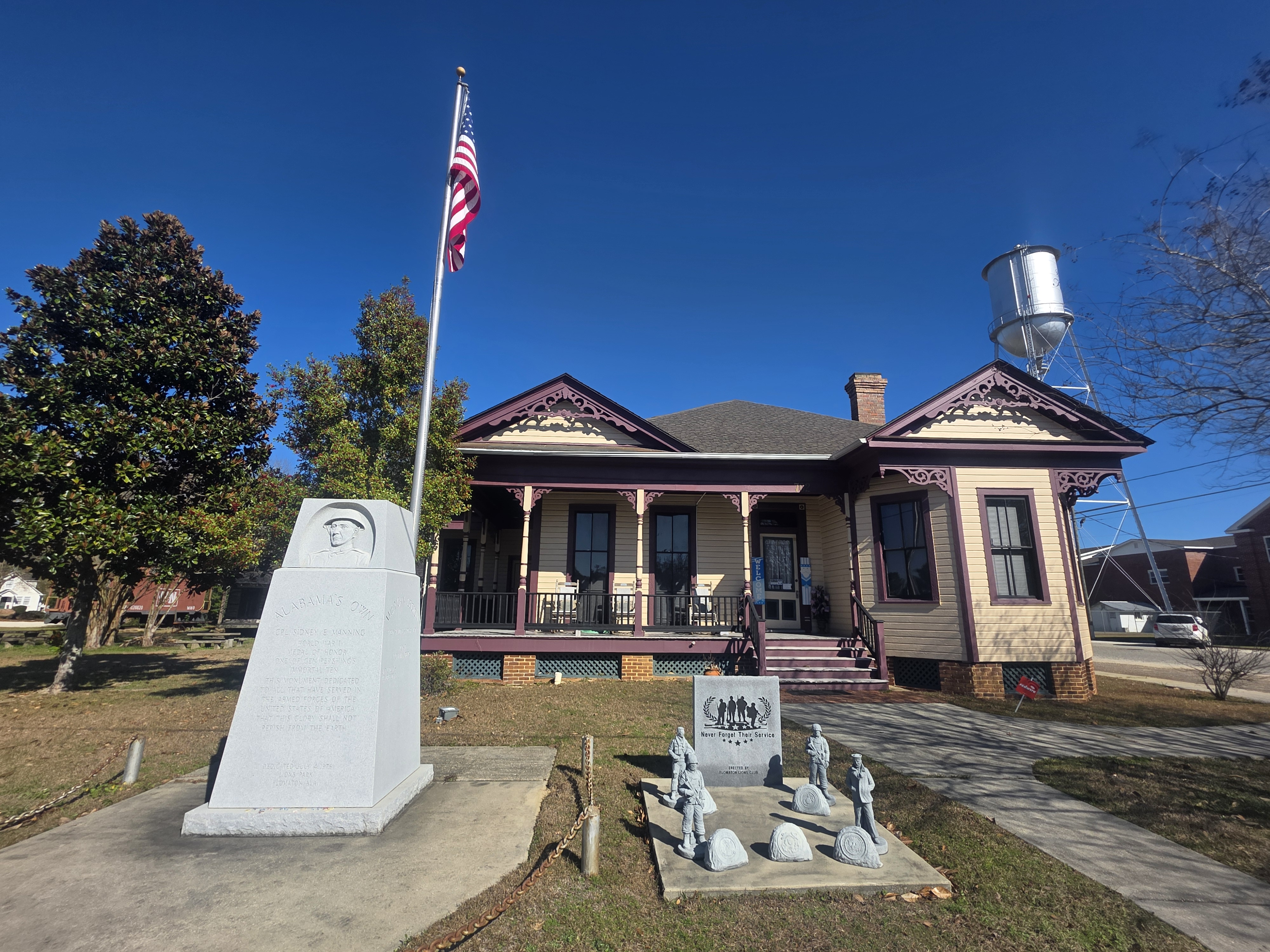
Flomaton Alabama Railroad Museum, Welcome Center, Sidney E Manning Memorial, War/Veterans Memorial.

== Family ==
In 1919, Manning married Mamie Knowles (1899–1977). They were the parents of two children, son Sidney Hill Manning (1921–1995) and a daughter who died young.

== Medal of Honor Citation ==
Rank and organization: Corporal, U.S. Army, Company G, 167th Infantry, 42d Division. Place and date: At Breuvannes, France; July 28, 1918. Entered service at: Flomaton, Alabama. Born: July 17, 1892; Butler County, Alabama. General Orders: War Department, General Orders No. 44 (April 2, 1919).

Citation:

When his platoon commander and platoon sergeant had both become casualties soon after the beginning of an assault on strongly fortified heights overlooking the Ourcq River, Corporal Manning took command of his platoon, which was near the center of the attacking line. Though himself severely wounded he led forward the 35 men remaining in the platoon and finally succeeded in gaining a foothold on the enemy's position, during which time he had received more wounds and all but seven of his men had fallen. Directing the consolidation of the position, he held off a large body of the enemy only 50 yards away by fire from his automatic rifle. He declined to take cover until his line had been entirely consolidated with the line of the platoon on the front when he dragged himself to shelter, suffering from nine wounds in all parts of the body.

== Military Awards ==
In a series of 1918 newspaper articles, General John J. Pershing designated Manning one of the "Immortal Ten" whose stories of wartime heroism were most worthy of commemoration. (Note: In addition to Manning, the "Immortal Ten" included Johannes S. Anderson, Donald M. Call, George Dilboy, Harold A. Furlong, George H. Mallon, Thomas C. Neibaur, Harold W. Roberts, Charles W. Whittlesey, and Samuel Woodfill. Pershing wrote prior to the investigation that led to Alvin York receiving the Medal of Honor, otherwise York would have been included.) Manning's military decorations and awards included:

1st row	Medal of Honor		
2nd row	Purple Heart	World War I Victory Medal w/one silver service star to denote credit for the Champagne-Marne, Aisne-Marne, St. Mihiel, Meuse-Argonne and Defensive Sector battle clasps.	Médaille militaire (French Republic)
3rd row	Croix de guerre 1914–1918 w/bronze palm (French Republic)	Croce al Merito di Guerra (Italy)	Medal for Military Bravery (Kingdom of Montenegro)

== See also ==
- List of Medal of Honor recipients
- List of Medal of Honor recipients for World War I
