= Schaffner =

Schaffner (German for "conductor") is a surname that is mainly found in German and English-speaking regions. Notable people with the surname include:

- Barbara Schaffner (born 1968), Swiss politician
- Daniel Schäffner (born 1981), German politician
- Dwite H. Schaffner (1889–1955), American Medal of Honor recipient
- Franklin J. Schaffner (1920–1989), American film director
- Hans Schaffner (1908–2004), Swiss liberal politician
- Jake Schaffner (born 2004), American baseball player
- Jakob Schaffner (1875–1944), Swiss novelist
- John Henry Schaffner (1866–1939), American botanist
- Kenneth F. Schaffner (born 1939), American philosopher
- Nicholas Schaffner (1953–1991), American writer on popular music
- William Schaffner (1941–1970), United States Air Force pilot

== See also ==
- Schaffer
- American clothiers Hart Schaffner & Marx, now known as Hartmarx
