= Michael B. Ellis =

US Army soldier and Medal of Honor recipient (1894–1937)

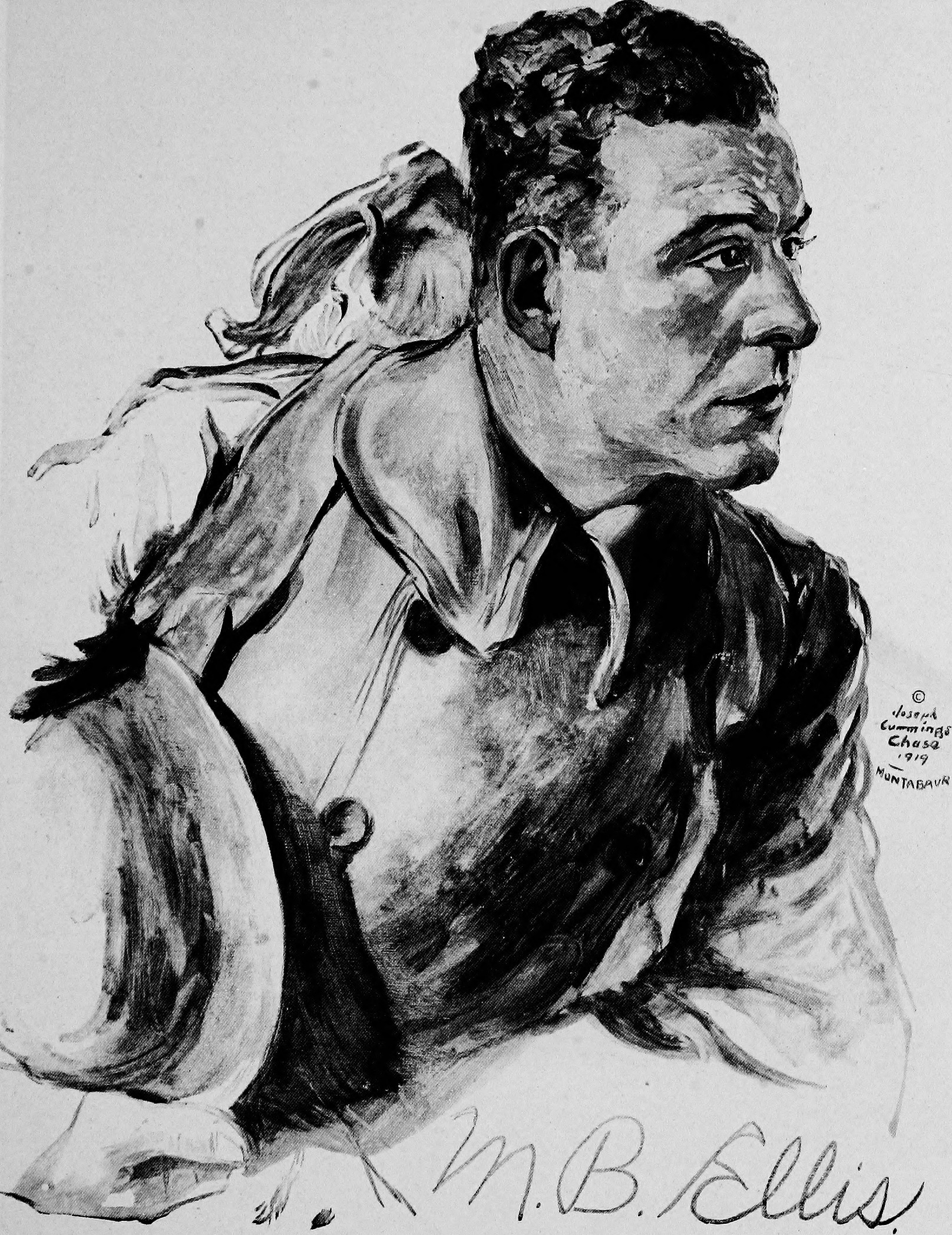
- Michael B. Ellis, by Joseph Cummings Chase
- Born: October 28, 1894; St. Louis, Missouri, US
- Died: December 9, 1937 (aged 43); Chicago, Illinois, US
- Burial place: Arlington National Cemetery, Section 6, site 9520
- Military career
- Allegiance: United States of America
- Branch: United States Army
- Service years: 1912–1919
- Rank: First Sergeant
- Nicknames: Machine-Gun Mike; The Lone Wolf; Sergeant York of St. Louis
- Units: Company K, 7th Infantry and later Company C, 28th Infantry, 1st Infantry Division
- Conflicts: World War I
- Awards: Medal of Honor; Silver Star

Michael B. Ellis (October 28, 1894 – December 9, 1937) was a United States Army sergeant and a recipient of the United States military's highest decoration, the Medal of Honor, for his actions in World War I.

== Early life and career ==
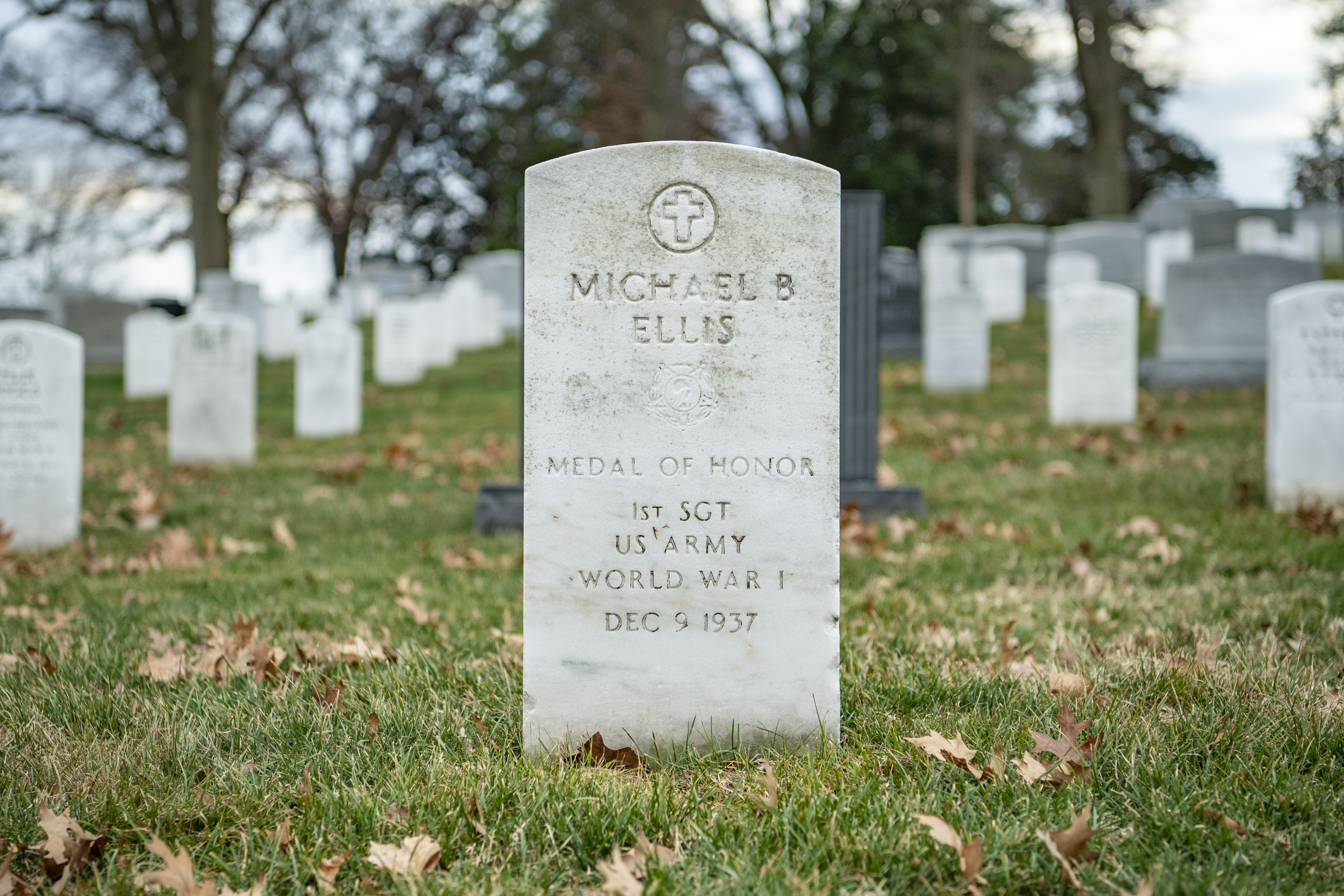
Grave at Arlington National Cemetery

Ellis was born in St. Louis, Missouri, on October 28, 1894. His mother died when he was an infant, and his father was too poor to provide for him properly. He was adopted by a Polish family, the Moczdlowskis, who lived in East St. Louis, Illinois. After attending St. Laurence O'Toole parochial school, he quit school at age 12 and worked in his adoptive father's print shop. Four years later, on February 8, 1912, he enlisted in the United States Army at Jefferson Barracks, Missouri.

He served with Company K, 7th Infantry, along the border with Mexico and at Veracruz. When his three-year term of service expired, Ellis received an honorable discharge, but after six months of civilian life he re-enlisted.

Sent to France as a private in Company C, 28th Infantry, 1st Division, he saw front-line action for 200 days near Soissons and was awarded the Silver Star. He was promoted to corporal on April 16, 1917, and to sergeant a month later. The official record of the War Department states:

He showed unusual courage in carrying supplies and in attacking strong points at Brouil, Pleissy, and Berney-le-Sac. Our allies, recognizing Sergeant Ellis' bravery, awarded him the Chevalier Legion of Honor of France, and the Croix de Guerre with Palm, the Cross of War of Italy, Cross of War of Poland and Recognition by the Moroccan Government, two medals, Senior and Junior.

On October 5, 1918, Ellis' division was participating in the Hundred Days Offensive near Exermont in northeast France. Ellis advanced ahead of his company and single-handedly attacked several German machine gun nests. In total, he silenced eleven machine guns and captured dozens of enemy soldiers. After many campaigns throughout France, he was promoted to first sergeant. In August 1919, he returned to St. Louis, where General John J. Pershing presented him with the Medal of Honor for his actions near Exermont. He was the only soldier in Pershing's 1st Division to receive this honor.

Ellis later had difficulty finding a job as a civilian. Informed of his troubles, President Calvin Coolidge arranged for him to work at the post office in St. Louis. On January 2, 1921, Ellis met a young woman of Polish descent. They discovered they had been childhood playmates in East St. Louis; the two were married on February 13, 1923, in St. Louis.

Ellis died of pneumonia in a Chicago hospital on December 9, 1937. He was buried at Arlington National Cemetery, Arlington, Virginia.

== Medal of Honor citation ==
Rank and organization: Sergeant, U.S. Army, Company C, 28th Infantry, 1st Division. Place and date: At Exermont, France; October 5, 1918. Entered service at: East St. Louis, Illinois. Born: October 28, 1894; St. Louis, Missouri. General Orders: War Department, General Orders No. 74 (June 7, 1919).

Citation:

During the entire day's engagement Sergeant Ellis operated far in advance of the first wave of his company, voluntarily undertaking most dangerous missions and single-handedly attacking and reducing machinegun nests. Flanking one emplacement, he killed two of the enemy with rifle fire and captured 17 others. Later he single-handedly advanced under heavy fire and captured 27 prisoners, including two officers and six machineguns, which had been holding up the advance of the company. The captured officers indicated the locations of four other machineguns, and he in turn captured these, together with their crews, at all times showing marked heroism and fearlessness.

== Military awards ==
Ellis' military decorations and awards include:

1st row	Medal of Honor	Silver Star		
2nd row	Mexican Service Medal		World War I Victory Medal w/one silver service star to denote credit for the Montdidier-Noyon, Aisne-Marne, St. Mihiel, Meuse-Argonne and Defensive Sector battle clasps.	Ordre national de la Légion d'honneur degree of Knight (French Republic)
3rd row	Croix de guerre 1914–1918 w/bronze palm (French Republic)		Croce al Merito di Guerra (Italy)	Krzyż Walecznych (Republic of Poland)
Unit Award	French Fourragère – Authorized permanent wear based on two French Croix de Guerre with Palm unit citations awarded the 28th Infantry Regiment for Picardy and Aisne-Marne			

== See also ==
- List of Medal of Honor recipients
- List of Medal of Honor recipients for World War I
