= Berger Loman =

United States Army Medal of Honor recipient

Berger Holton Loman
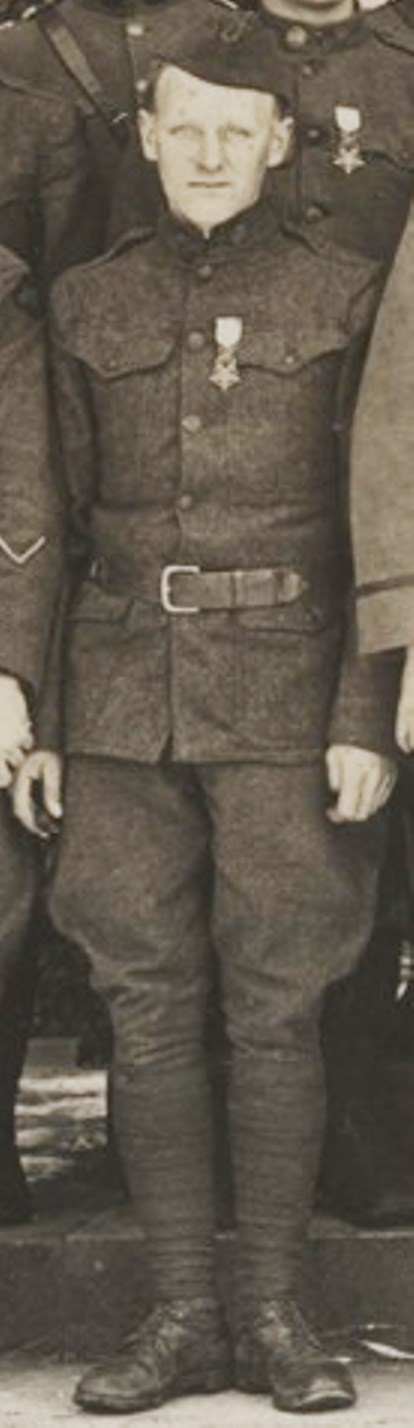
- Medal of Honor recipient
- Born: August 24, 1886; Norway
- Died: May 9, 1968 (aged 81)
- Burial place: Arlington National Cemetery
- Military career
- Allegiance: United States of America
- Branch: United States Army
- Rank: Corporal
- Service number: 1389565
- Units: Company H, 132d Infantry, 33d Division
- Awards: Medal of Honor

Berger Holton Loman (24 August 1886 – 9 May 1968) was a U.S. Army soldier, assigned to Company H, 132d Infantry, 33d Division. Born in Norway, he received the Medal of Honor for his actions near Consenvoye, France, on October 9, 1918, during World War I.

== Medal of Honor citation ==
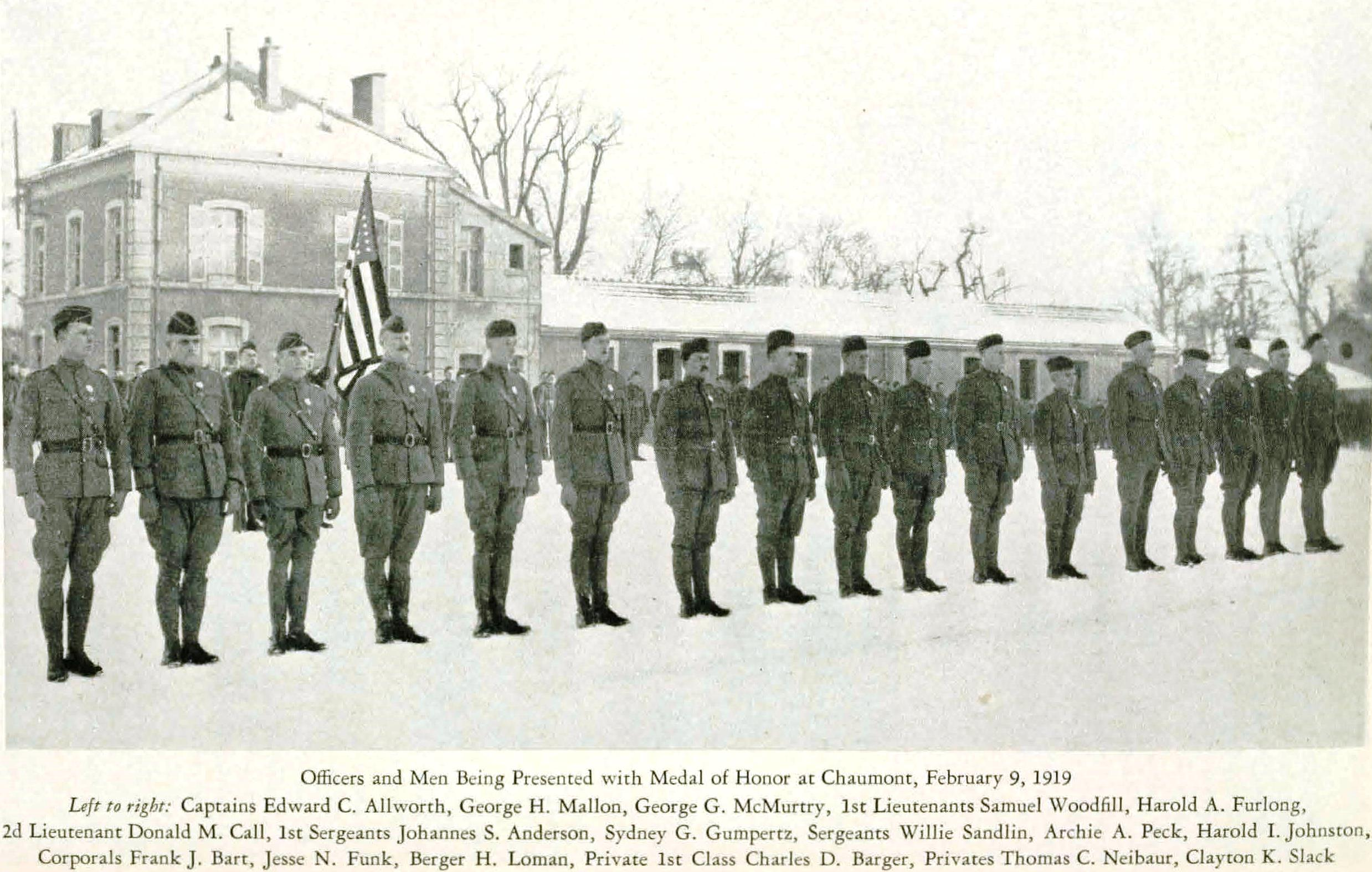
Medal of Honor Presentation Ceremony - February 9, 1919, at Chaumont, France. General John J. Pershing presided.

- Rank and organization: Private, U.S. Army, Company H, 132d Infantry, 33d Division.
- Place and date: Near Consenvoye, France, 9 October 1918.
- Entered service at: Chicago, Illinois.
- Born. 24 August 1886, Bergen, Norway.
- General Order No. 16. Department of War 1919.

Citation

When his company had reached a point within 100 yards [30 meters] of its objective, to which it was advancing under terrific machine gun fire, Pvt. Loman voluntarily and unaided made his way forward after all others had taken shelter from the direct fire of an enemy machine gun. He crawled to a flank position of the gun and, after killing or capturing the entire crew, turned the machine gun on the retreating enemy.

== See also ==
- List of Medal of Honor recipients for World War I
