= Daniel R. Edwards =

United States Army Medal of Honor recipient

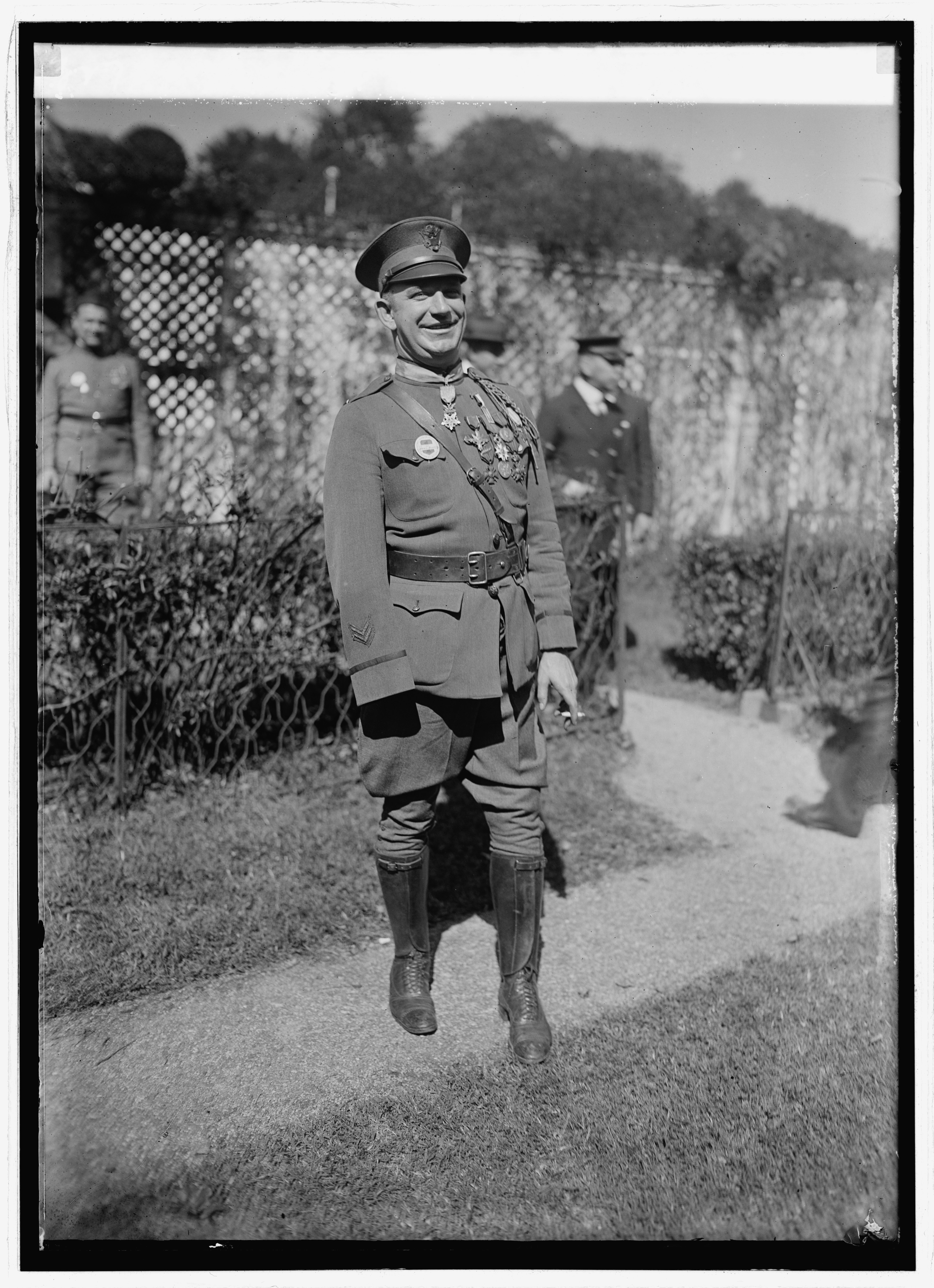
- Edward at White House in 1924
- Born: April 9, 1897; Mooreville, Texas, US
- Died: October 21, 1967 (aged 70)
- Burial place: Cunningham Cemetery, Royal, Arkansas
- Military career
- Allegiance: United States of America
- Branch: United States Army
- Rank: Major
- Service number: 106546
- Units: Company C, 3d Machine Gun Battalion, 1st Division
- Conflicts: World War I World War II
- Awards: Medal of Honor; Distinguished Service Cross; Silver Star; Purple Heart (2)

Daniel Richmond Edwards (April 9, 1897 – October 21, 1967) was an American soldier serving in the United States Army during World War I who received the Medal of Honor for bravery.

== Biography ==
Edwards was born April 9, 1897, in Mooreville, Texas and graduated from the Columbia University School of Journalism.

He enlisted in the United States Army in April 1917, on the day the United States entered World War I. He was sent to France as a member of the 1st Division of the American Expeditionary Forces (AEF), where he performed the actions that earned him the Medal of Honor, the Distinguished Service Cross and the Silver Star. Along with Samuel I. Parker, Edwards is considered one of the two most-decorated U.S. infantrymen by American awards; Samuel Woodfill has more, if French awards are counted.

He married and lived in the Bronx after the war where he was a member of the Come-Back Club, an organization for disabled and returning veterans. He also worked for Warren G. Harding's presidential election campaign, and later served in World War II.

He died, at the age of 70, on October 21, 1967, and is buried in Cunningham Cemetery located in Royal, Arkansas.

== Medal of Honor Citation ==
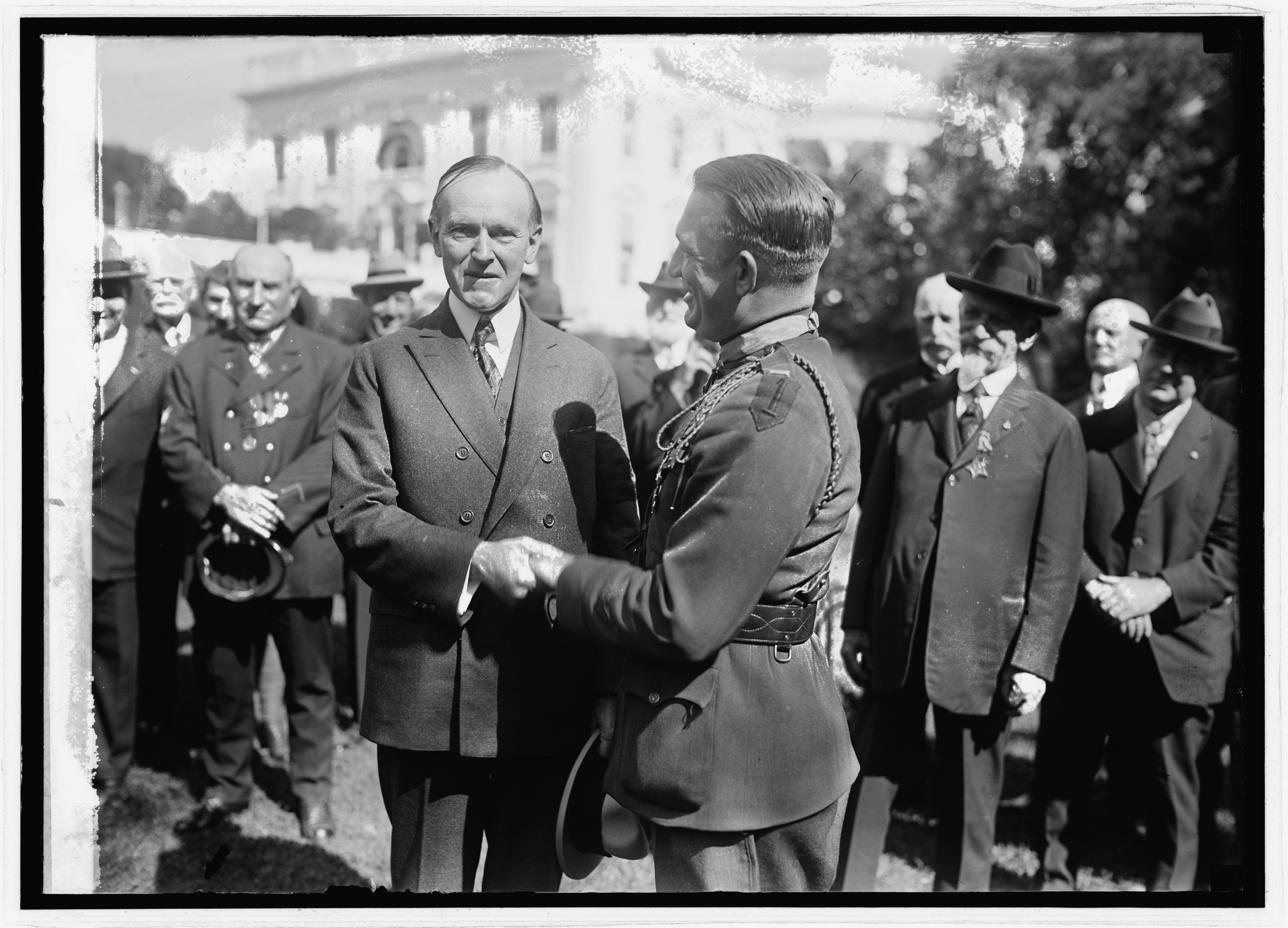
Edwards receiving the Medal of Honor from President Coolidge in 1924.

Rank and organization: Private First Class, U.S. Army, Company C, 3d Machine Gun Battalion, 1st Division. Place and date: Near Soissons, France, 18 July 1918. Entered service at: Bruceville, Tex. Born: 9 April 1897, Moorville, Tex. General Orders: War Department, General Orders No. 14 (April 4, 1923).

Citation:

Reporting for duty from hospital where he had been for several weeks under treatment for numerous and serious wounds and although suffering intense pain from a shattered arm, he crawled alone into an enemy trench for the purpose of capturing or killing enemy soldiers known to be concealed therein. He killed 4 of the men and took the remaining 4 men prisoners; while conducting them to the rear one of the enemy was killed by a high explosive enemy shell which also completely shattered 1 of Pfc. Edwards' legs, causing him to be immediately evacuated to the hospital. The bravery of Pfc. Edwards, now a tradition in his battalion because of his previous gallant acts, again caused the morale of his comrades to be raised to high pitch.

== Distinguished Service Cross Citation ==
Rank and organization: Private, U.S. Army, Company C, 3rd Machine Gun Battalion, 1st Division, American Expeditionary Forces. Action Dates: May 28–30, 1918. General Orders: War Department, General Orders No. 15 (1923).

Citation:

The President of the United States of America, authorized by Act of Congress, July 9, 1918, takes pleasure in presenting the Distinguished Service Cross to Private Daniel Richmond Edwards (ASN: 106546), United States Army, for extraordinary heroism in action while serving with Company C, 3d Machine-Gun Battalion, 1st Division, A.E.F., at Cantigny, France, May 28–30, 1918. Serving as gunner of his machine-gun squad Private Edwards advanced with the first assault line of the Infantry and while passing through the village of Cantigny at 5:30 a.m., May 28 carrying his machine gun upon his shoulder, he was attacked by an enemy soldier and bayoneted, receiving a severe wrist wound; the enemy soldier was killed by an infantryman. Continuing in the advance beyond Cantigny and meeting intense enemy fire, the attacking wave was halted. Private Edwards with his squad remained in an advanced position, protecting with his fire the Infantry which had fallen back to a more advantageous position and were entrenching. While thus engaged the machine gunners repulsed two determined enemy counterattacks, during which the three members of the squad accompanying Private Edwards were killed and he himself severely wounded. Despite these wounds, which he himself dressed, he remained alone in his position throughout the day, firing whenever a target offered, withstanding attacks by liquid fire and machine-gun fire, he refused to be evacuated and continued to operate his gun until nightfall, when his company was relieved. His extraordinary bravery and devotion to duty, his fortitude and undaunted determination despite his numerous and painful wounds, incited the men of his battalion to splendid endeavors and raised their morale to an extremely high pitch.

== Silver Star Citation ==
Rank and organization: Private, U.S. Army, Company C, 3rd Machine Gun Battalion, 1st Division, American Expeditionary Forces. Action Dates: May 27–31, 1918. General Orders: Headquarters, 1st Division, A.E.F., General Orders No. 29 (June 22, 1918).

Citation:

By direction of the President, under the provisions of the act of Congress approved July 9, 1918 (Bul. No. 43, W.D., 1918), Private Daniel R. Edwards, United States Army, is cited by the Commanding General, 1st Division, American Expeditionary Forces, for gallantry in action and a silver star may be placed upon the ribbon of the Victory Medals awarded him. Private Edwards distinguished himself by gallantry in action while serving with Company C, 3rd Machine Gun Battalion, 1st Division, American Expeditionary Forces, in action during the operations connected with the capture and defense of Cantigny, France, 27 to 31 May 1918. Private Edwards refused to leave his gun and continued its operation after the other men of his crew had been killed and he, himself, had been wounded.

== Military Awards ==
Edwards' military decorations and awards include:

1st row	Medal of Honor	Distinguished Service Cross	Silver Star
2nd row	Purple Heart w/one bronze oak leaf cluster	World War I Victory Medal w/three bronze service stars to denote credit for the Montdidier‑Noyon, Aisne‑Marne and Defensive Sector battle clasps.	Médaille militaire (French Republic)
3rd row	Croix de guerre 1914–1918 w/bronze palm (French Republic)	Croce al Merito di Guerra (Italy)	Medal for Military Bravery (Kingdom of Montenegro)
Unit Award	French Fourragère - Authorized permanent wear based on award to 1st Division in World War I.		

== In popular culture ==
Daniel R. Edwards appears in the 1931 short film Ripley's Believe It or Not!, No. 7.

At the conclusion of the 1962 film The Manchurian Candidate, Frank Sinatra's character reads Edwards' and Nelson M. Holderman's Medal of Honor citations.

Lowell Thomas wrote about the adventures of Dan Edwards in the book, "This Side of Hell".

In the video game Battlefield 1, the protagonist of the chapter Through Mud and Blood has the same name as Edwards. This character in the game is British rather than American and participates in the war as the tank driver for the Mark V tank named Black Bess.

== See also ==
- List of Medal of Honor recipients
- List of Medal of Honor recipients for World War I

== External References ==
- Texas State Cemetery entry
