= David E. Hayden =

US Navy sailor and Medal of Honor recipient (1897–1974)

David Ephraim Hayden
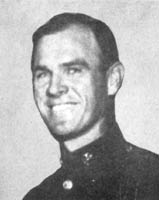
- David Ephraim Hayden
- Born: October 2, 1897; Florence, Texas, U.S.
- Died: March 18, 1974 (aged 76); Fresno, California, U.S.
- Burial place: Arlington National Cemetery, Section 36
- Military career
- Allegiance: United States of America
- Branch: United States Navy
- Service years: 1917–1920
- Rank: Pharmacist's Mate Third Class
- Unit: 2nd Battalion 6th Marines
- Conflicts: World War I: Battle of Saint-Mihiel
- Awards: Medal of Honor; Silver Star

David Ephraim Hayden (October 2, 1897 – March 18, 1974) was a United States Navy Hospital Corpsman who served during World War I and earned the Medal of Honor for valiant actions in France.

== Biography ==
Hayden was born in Florence, Texas, and enlisted in the Navy in October 1917. He received training in San Diego Naval Base, California, and Quantico, Virginia. During the war, he was attached to the 2/6th Marines as a Hospital Apprentice First Class. The Marine outfit saw action in France at the Battle of Saint-Mihiel, during which Hayden ran through heavy enemy fire to administer aid to a wounded Marine, Corporal Creed. For this action, he was awarded the Medal of Honor.

After the war, Hayden was promoted to Pharmacist's Mate Third Class. He served aboard the troop transport Princess Matoika until the summer of 1920. He served as a deputy United States marshal in California from 1934 to 1966. David E Hayden died on March 18, 1974, and He was buried at Arlington National Cemetery, Arlington, Virginia.

== Medal of Honor citation ==
Rank and organization: Hospital Apprentice First Class, U.S. Navy, serving with the 2d Battalion, 6th Regiment, U.S. Marines. Place and date: Thiaucourt, France, 15 September 1918. Entered service at: Texas. Born: 2 October 1897 Florence, Tex.

Citation:

For gallantry and intrepidity at the risk of his life above and beyond the call of duty. During the advance, when Cpl. Creed was mortally wounded while crossing an open field swept by machinegun fire, Hayden unhesitatingly ran to his assistance and, finding him so severely wounded as to require immediate attention, disregarded his own personal safety to dress the wound under intense machinegun fire, and then carried the wounded man back to a place of safety.

== See also ==
- List of Medal of Honor recipients for World War I
