= Ralph Talbot =

American aviator and Medal of Honor recipient

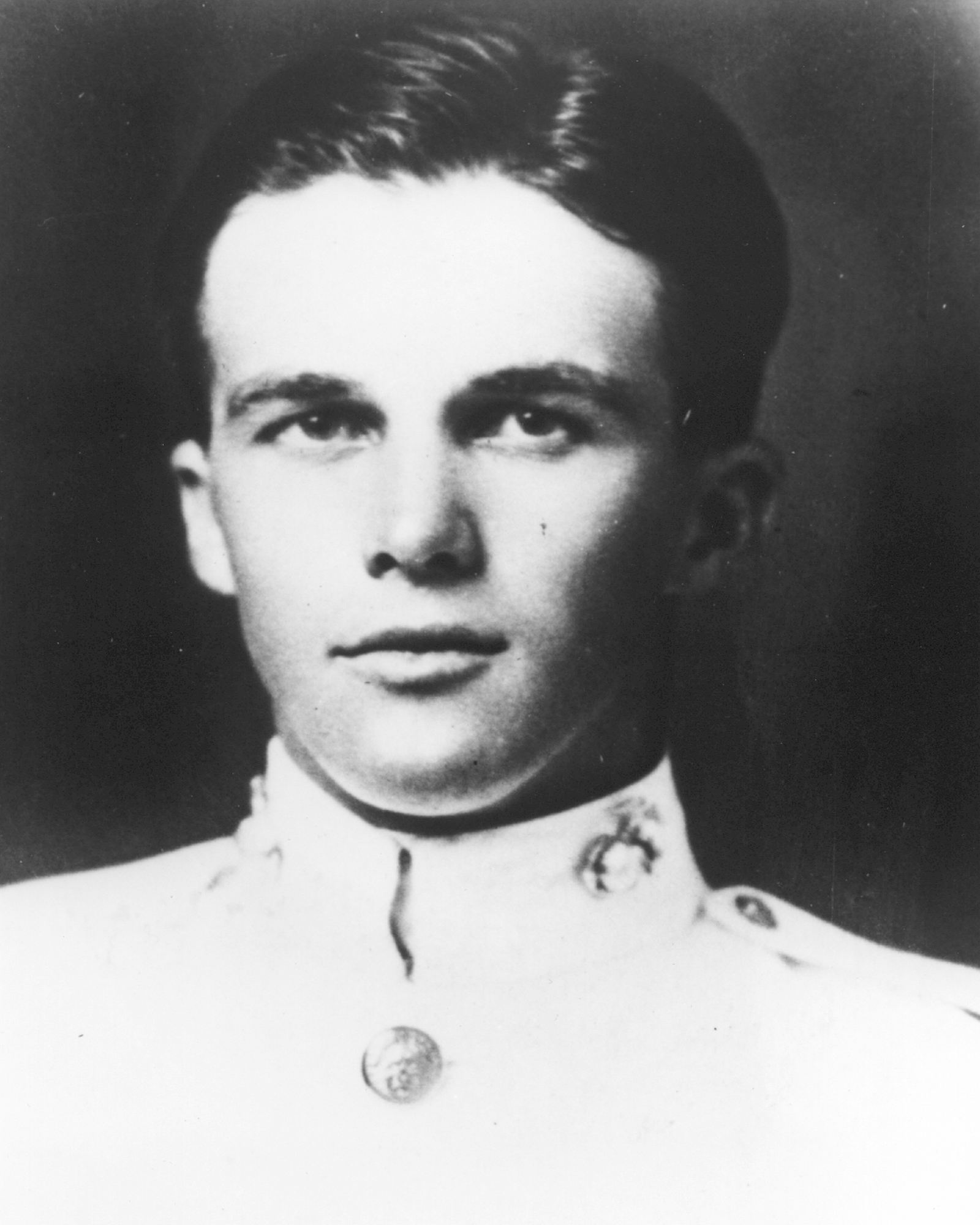
- Born: January 6, 1897; Weymouth, Massachusetts
- Died: October 25, 1918 (aged 21); KIFA at La Fresne aerodrome, France
- Burial place: Mount Wollaston Cemetery, Quincy, Massachusetts
- Military career
- Allegiance: United States of America
- Branch: United States Marine Corps
- Service years: 1917–1918
- Rank: Second lieutenant
- Unit: 1st Marine Aviation Force
- Conflicts: World War I
- Awards: Medal of Honor

Ralph Talbot (January 6, 1897 – October 25, 1918) was the first United States Marine Corps aviator to receive the Medal of Honor — for "exceptionally meritorious service and extraordinary heroism" while attached to Squadron C, U.S. 1st Marine Aviation Force, in France during World War I.

== Background ==
Talbot was born January 6, 1897, at South Weymouth, Massachusetts, and attended Weymouth High School. He was gifted both athletically and academically and entered Mercersburg Academy, Pennsylvania, in the autumn of 1915. A year later he entered Yale University. Whilst serving in the college's Artillery Training Corps, Talbot became interested in aviation and enrolled at the Dupont Flying School in Wilmington, Delaware.

== Early military service ==
Talbot enlisted in the United States Navy in October 1917 with the rank of Seaman 2nd Class. After ground training at the Massachusetts Institute of Technology and flying tuition in Florida, he became Naval Aviator No. 456. At the time, the Marine Corps were having problems recruiting aviators. Along with a number of other navy pilots, Talbot therefore realised that he was more likely to achieve his ambition of being posted overseas if he joined the Marines. Having resigned from the navy, he was appointed a second lieutenant in the Marine Corps Reserve on May 18, 1918. He arrived in Miami a week later to join the First Marine Aviation Force with Squadron C. On July 18, 1918, Talbot was part of the initial party which sailed from New York City for active service as part of the US's involvement in World War I.

== Involvement in World War I ==
A participant in numerous raids into enemy territory, Second Lieutenant Talbot was attacked by nine Luftstreitkräfte enemy scouts while on such a raid over Belgium, October 8, 1918, and in the ensuing fight shot down one of his attackers. Six days later, while on a strike against an enemy ammunition depot at Pittem, he and another plane became detached from the formation due to motor trouble and were attacked by 12 enemy scouts. In the fight which followed, his plane shot down one of the enemy scouts before his observer, Gunnery Sergeant Robert G. Robinson, was shot and the gun jammed. Talbot maneuvered the DeHavilland to gain time while Robinson cleared the gun, then rejoined the battle. Robinson kept on firing until he collapsed from two more wounds. Talbot continued alone, shot down another enemy plane, then dived to escape the remaining Fokker D.VII fighters. Crossing the German trenches at 50 feet, he kept his ship with its failing motor in the air until he reached the nearest hospital where he landed, delivered Robinson to medical personnel and returned to his aerodrome.

Second Lieutenant Talbot died on October 25, 1918, when his DH-4 crashed on takeoff, during an engine test flight, at La Fresne aerodrome.

== Namesakes ==
- In 1936, the destroyer USS Ralph Talbot (DD-390) was named in his honor.
- Also Ralph Talbot School and Street in Weymouth, Massachusetts were named after him

== Medal of Honor citation ==
Rank and organization: Second Lieutenant, U.S. Marine Corps. Born: January 6, 1897, South Weymouth, Mass. Appointed from: Connecticut.

Citation:

For exceptionally meritorious service and extraordinary heroism while attached to Squadron C, 1st Marine Aviation Force, in France. 2d Lt. Talbot participated in numerous air raids into enemy territory. On 8 October 1918, while on such a raid, he was attacked by 9 enemy scouts, and in the fight that followed shot down an enemy plane. Also, on 14 October 1918, while on a raid over Pittham, Belgium, 2d Lt. Talbot and another plane became detached from the formation on account of motor trouble and were attacked by 12 enemy scouts. During the severe fight that followed, his plane shot down 1 of the enemy scouts. His observer was shot through the elbow and his gun jammed. 2d Lt. Talbot maneuvered to gain time for his observer to clear the jam with one hand, and then returned to the fight. The observer fought until shot twice, once in the stomach and once in the hip and then collapsed, 2d Lt. Talbot attacked the nearest enemy scout with his front guns and shot him down. With his observer unconscious and his motor failing, he dived to escape the balance of the enemy and crossed the German trenches at an altitude of 50 feet, landing at the nearest hospital to leave his observer, and then returning to his aerodrome.

== See also ==
- List of Medal of Honor recipients
- List of Medal of Honor recipients for World War I
