= Jesse Whitfield Covington =

US Navy Medal of Honor recipient

Jesse W. Covington
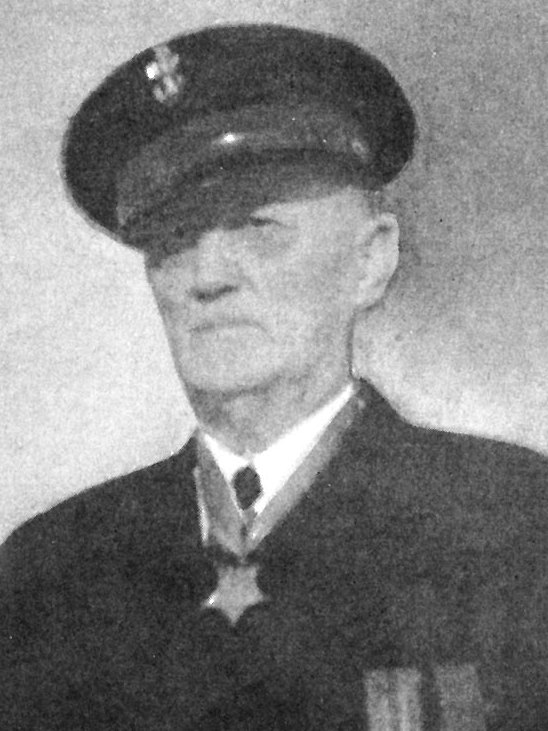
- Jesse W. Covington
- Born: September 16, 1889; Haywood County, Tennessee, U.S.
- Died: November 21, 1966 (aged 77); Richmond, Virginia, U.S.
- Military career
- Allegiance: United States
- Branch: United States Navy
- Service years: 1908 - 1935
- Rank: Chief Steward
- Unit: U.S.S. Stewart
- Conflicts: World War I
- Awards: Medal of Honor

Jesse Whitfield Covington (September 16, 1889 – November 21, 1966) was an American sailor serving in the United States Navy during World War I who received the Medal of Honor for bravery.

== Biography ==
Covington was born September 16, 1889, in Haywood County, Tennessee and after enlisting in the United States Navy was sent to France to fight in World War I. He retired from the Navy in 1935 as a chief petty officer.

He died November 21, 1966.

== Medal of Honor citation ==
Rank and organization: Ship's Cook Third Class, U.S. Navy. Place and date: At sea aboard the USS Stewart (DD-13), 17 April 1918. Entered service at: California. Born: 16 September 1889, Haywood, Tenn. G.O. No.: 403, 1918.

Citation:

For extraordinary heroism following internal explosion of the Florence H. The sea in the vicinity of wreckage was covered by a mass of boxes of smokeless powder, which were repeatedly exploding. Jesse W. Covington, of the U.S.S. Stewart, plunged overboard to rescue a survivor who was surrounded by powder boxes and too exhausted to help himself, fully realizing that similar powder boxes in the vicinity were continually exploding and that he was thereby risking his life in saving the life of this man.

== See also ==
- List of Medal of Honor recipients
- List of Medal of Honor recipients for World War I
