= Robert G. Robinson =

US Marine Corps officer and Medal of Honor recipient (1894–1974)

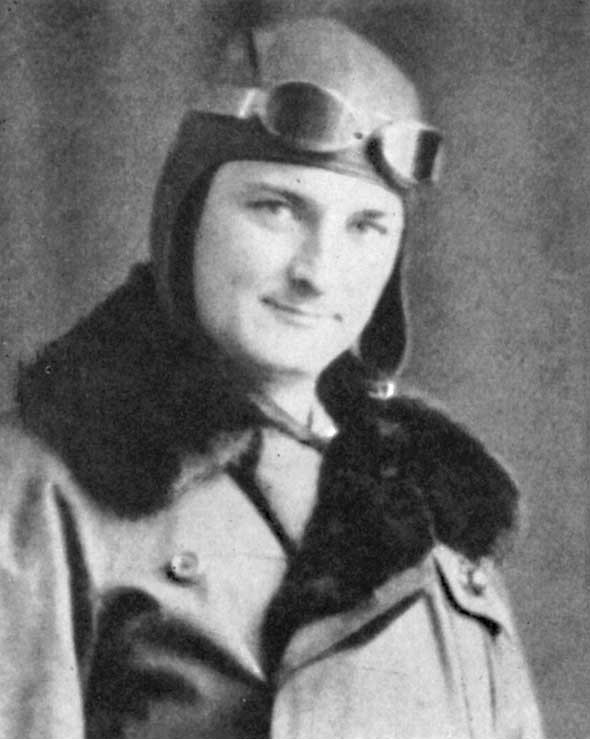
- Gunnery Sergeant Robert G. Robinson, USMC
- Born: April 30, 1894; Wayne, Michigan, US
- Died: October 5, 1974 (aged 80); St. Ignace, Michigan, US
- Burial place: Arlington National Cemetery
- Military career
- Allegiance: United States
- Branch: United States Marine Corps
- Service years: 1917–1923
- Rank: First lieutenant
- Unit: 1st Marine Aviation Force
- Conflicts: World War I
- Awards: Medal of Honor

Robert Guy Robinson (April 30, 1894 – October 5, 1974) was a United States Marine Corps first lieutenant who earned the Medal of Honor as a gunnery sergeant during World War I.

== Biography ==
Robert Robinson was born in Wayne, Michigan on April 30, 1894. On May 22, 1917, he enlisted as a private in the Marines and the action in France followed. Although seriously wounded during aerial action over Belgium, he continued to fight and successfully drove off attacking enemy scout planes before two additional bullet wounds forced his collapse. For his heroism and gallantry in this and previous action with enemy planes, while attached to the 1st Marine Aviation Force as an observer, GySgt Robinson received the nation's highest award.

Gunnery Sergeant Robinson, shot 13 times in the abdomen, chest, and legs, and with his left arm virtually blown off at the elbow, helped bring the plane down in Belgian territory. His arm, hanging by a single tendon, was grafted back on by the surgeon-general of the Belgian army. The pilot of his plane, Lt Ralph Talbot of Weymouth, Massachusetts, who was posthumously awarded the Medal of Honor for this same action, was killed in a plane crash a few days later.

He was honorably discharged in 1919 as a gunnery sergeant and was appointed a second lieutenant in the Marine Corps Reserve. His retirement was effected in May 1923 and his promotion to the rank of first lieutenant in September 1936.

Upon retirement, he made his home at St. Ignace, Michigan. Robinson died on October 5, 1974, at his home. He is buried at Arlington National Cemetery, in Arlington, Virginia.

== Medal of Honor citation ==
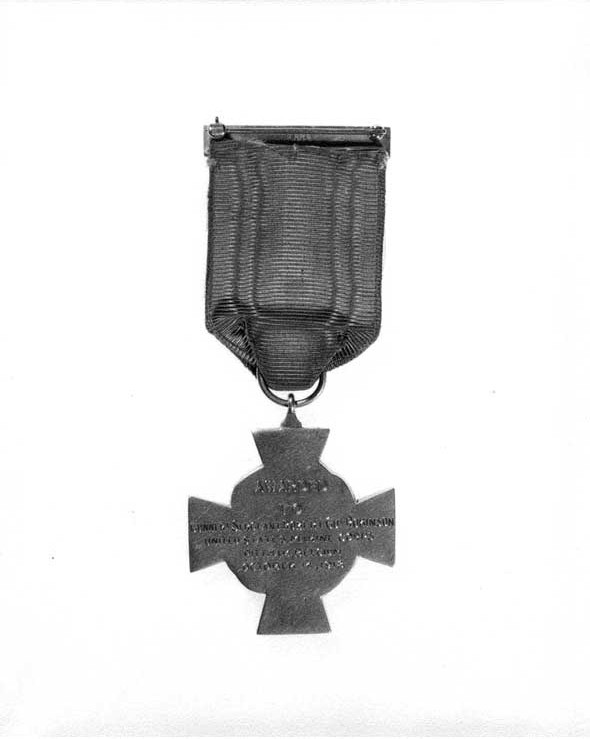
Reverse of the Tiffany Cross Medal of Honor awarded to Gunnery Sergeant Robinson

ROBINSON, Robert Guy
Gunnery Sergeant, U.S. Marine Corps
1st Marine Aviation Force

Citation:

For extraordinary heroism as observer in the 1st Marine Aviation Force at the front in France. In company with planes from Squadron 218, Royal Air Force, conducting an air raid on 8 October 1918, Gunnery Sergeant Robinson's plane was attacked by nine enemy scouts. In the fight which followed, he shot down one of the enemy planes. In a later air raid over Pitthan, Belgium, on 14 October 1918, his plane and one other became separated from their formation on account of motor trouble and were attacked by 12 enemy scouts. Acting with conspicuous gallantry and intrepidity in the fight which ensured, Gunnery Sergeant Robinson, after shooting down one of the enemy planes, was struck by a bullet which carried away most of his elbow. At the same time his gun jammed. While his pilot maneuvered for position, he cleared the jam with one hand and returned to the fight. Although his left arm was useless, he fought off the enemy scouts until he collapsed after receiving two more bullet wounds, one in the stomach and one in the thigh.

== Military awards ==
Robinson's military decorations and awards include:

1st row	Medal of Honor		
2nd row	Purple Heart	Marine Corps Good Conduct Medal	World War I Victory Medal w/one bronze service star to denote credit for the Aviation service clasp

== See also ==
- List of Medal of Honor recipients
- List of Medal of Honor recipients for World War I
