= Phillip C. Katz =

Philip C. Katz
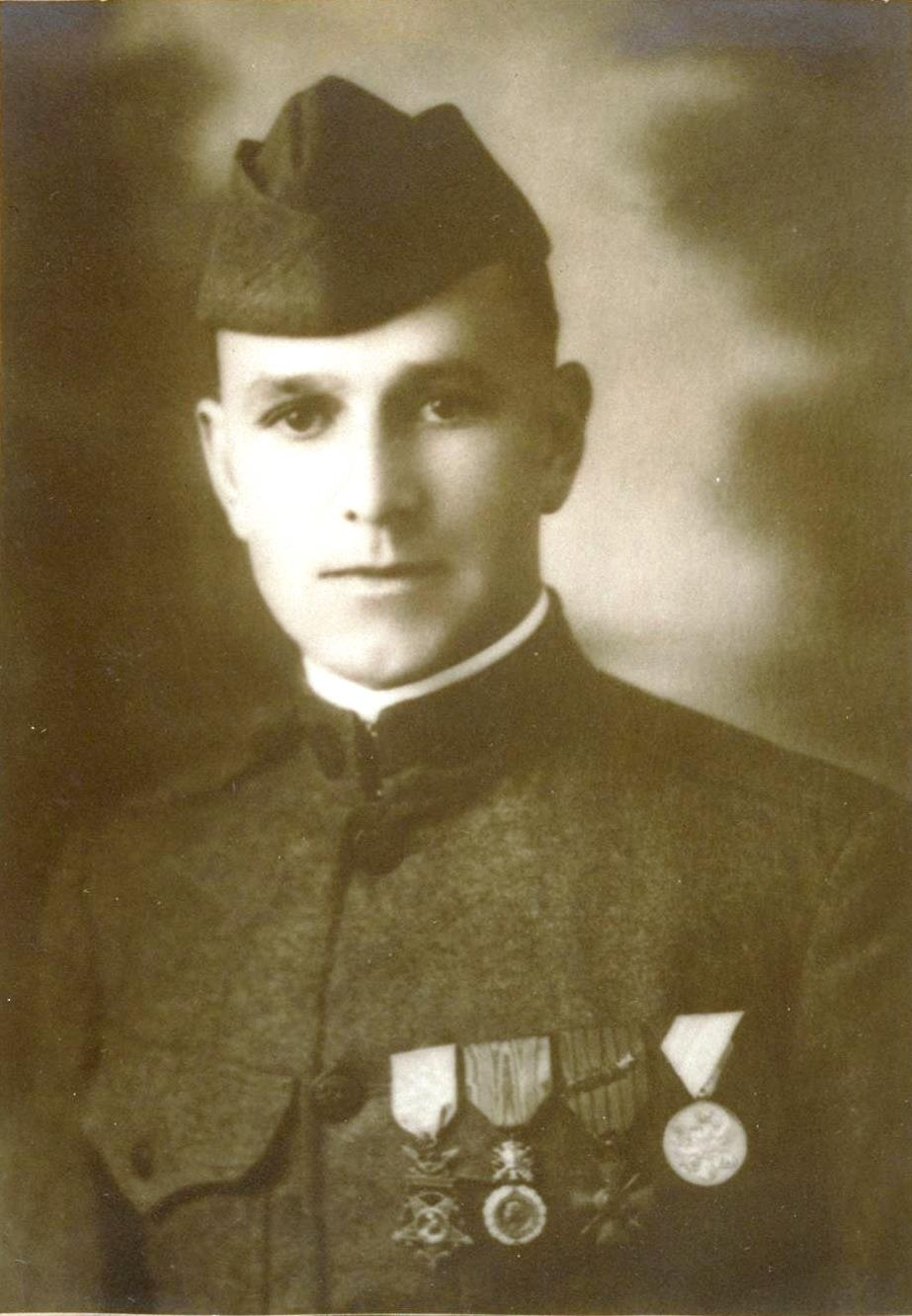
- Medal of Honor recipient
- Born: December 12, 1889; San Francisco, California
- Died: October 29, 1987 (aged 97); San Francisco, California
- Military career
- Allegiance: United States
- Branch: United States Army
- Rank: Sergeant
- Service number: 2263512
- Units: 363rd Infantry, 91st Division
- Awards: Medal of Honor

Phillip Carl Katz (December 12, 1889 – October 29, 1987) was a sergeant in the U.S. Army during World War I. He earned the Medal of Honor for his actions in combat.

== Medal of Honor Citation ==
Rank and organization: Sergeant, U.S. Army, Company C, 363rd Infantry, 91st Division. Place and date: At Eclisfontaine, France; September 26, 1918. Entered service at: San Francisco, California. Birth: December 12, 1889; San Francisco, California. General Orders: War Department, General Orders No. 16 ( January 22, 1919).

Citation:

After his company had withdrawn for a distance of 200 yards on a line with the units on its flanks, Sgt. Katz learned that one of his comrades had been left wounded in an exposed position at the point from which the withdrawal had taken place. Voluntarily crossing an area swept by heavy machine gun fire, he advanced to where the wounded soldier lay and carried him to a place of safety.

== Military Awards ==
Katz' military decorations and awards include:

1st row	Medal of Honor	World War I Victory Medal w/four bronze service stars to denote credit for the Ypres-Lys, St. Mihiel, Meuse-Argonne and Defensive Sector battle clasps.	Médaille militaire (French Republic)
2nd row	Croix de guerre 1914–1918 w/bronze palm (French Republic)	Croce al Merito di Guerra (Italy)	Medal for Military Bravery (Kingdom of Montenegro)

== See also ==
- List of Medal of Honor recipients for World War I
