= Johannes S. Anderson =

United States Army Medal of Honor recipient

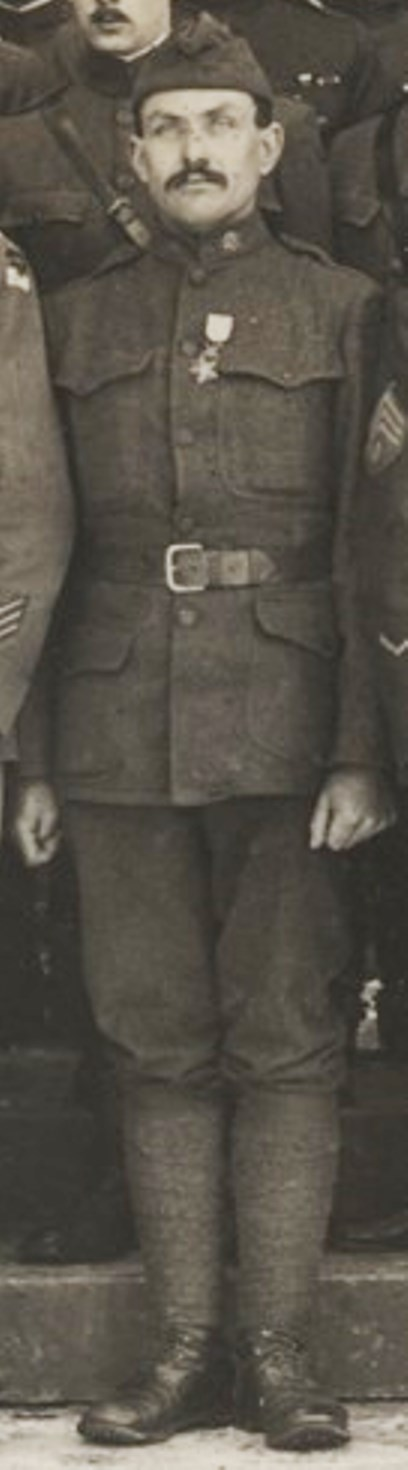
- Medal of Honor recipient
- Born: July 20, 1887; Grand Duchy of Finland, Russian Empire
- Died: April 15, 1950 (aged 62)
- Burial place: Acacia Park Cemetery and Mausoleum, Chicago, Illinois
- Military career
- Allegiance: United States
- Branch: United States Army
- Service years: June 19, 1916 to May 30, 1919
- Rank: First Sergeant
- Service number: 1389034
- Units: Company B, 132d Infantry, 33rd Infantry Division
- Conflicts: World War I
- Awards: Medal of Honor

Johannes Seigfried Anderson (July 20, 1887 – April 15, 1950) was a Finnish-born U.S. Army soldier during World War I, and a Medal of Honor recipient.

== Biography ==
Little is known of Anderson's early life, other than that he was born in Finland July 20, 1887, and entered the US Army in Chicago, Illinois June 19, 1916. On October 8, 1918, while fighting near Consenvoye, France, while his unit was pinned down by heavy Austro-Hungarian machine gun fire, First Sergeant Anderson volunteered to leave his unit in an attempt at flanking the enemy machine gun emplacement. He made his advance under heavy fire, over open ground, reaching the emplacement and killing the machine gun crew. He silenced the machine gun, captured it, and returned with twenty-three prisoners of war.

He died April 15, 1950, and is buried in Acacia Park Cemetery and Mausoleum Chicago, Illinois.

== Medal of Honor Citation ==
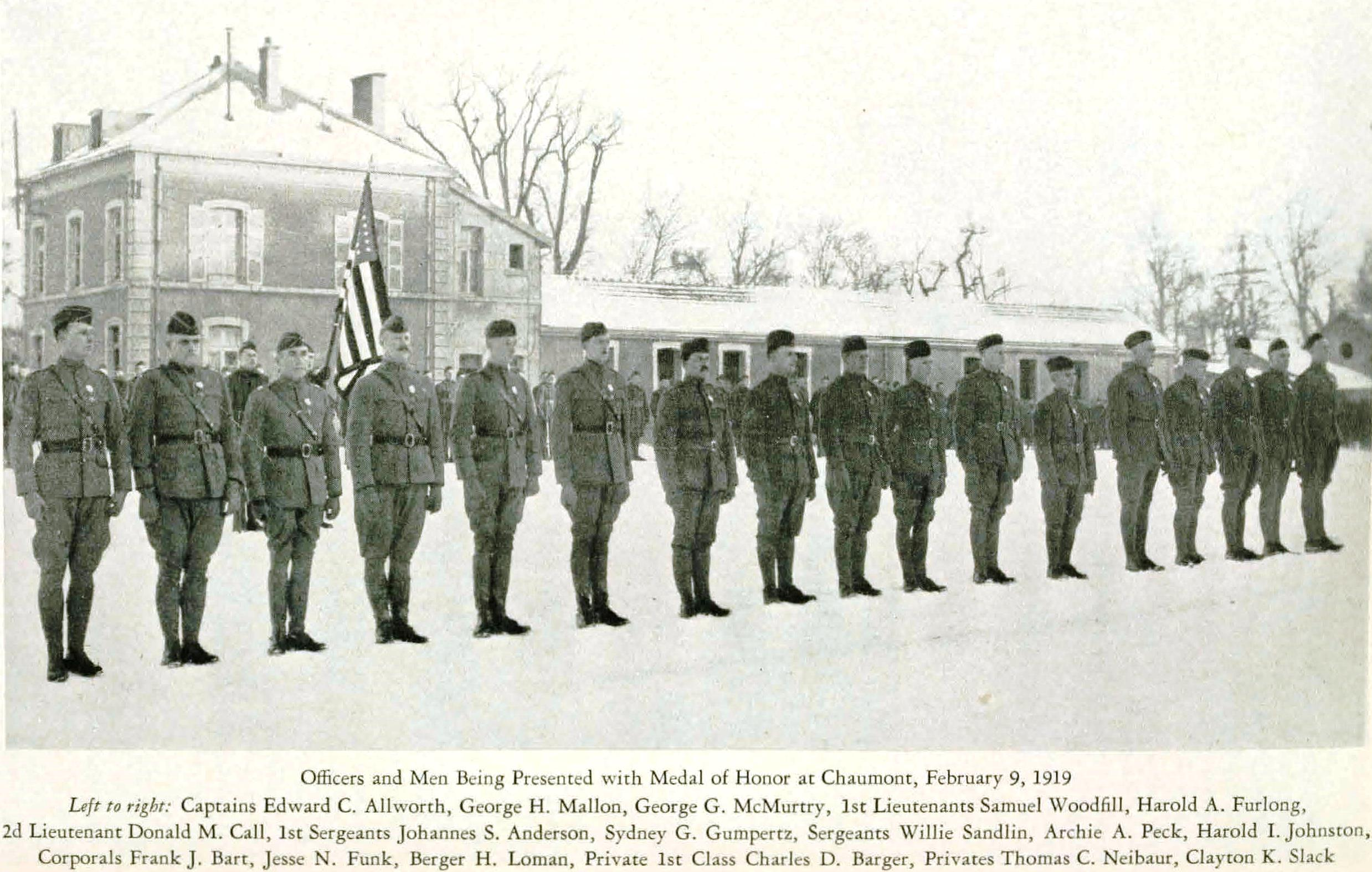
Medal of Honor Presentation Ceremony - February 9, 1919, at Chaumont, France. General John J. Pershing presided.

- Rank and organization: First Sergeant, U.S. Army, Company B, 132d Infantry, 33d Division.
- Place and date: At Consenvoye, France, October 8, 1918.
- Entered service at: Chicago, Ill., June 19, 1916
- Birth: Finland.
- General Orders No.16, War Department, 1919.

Citation:

While his company was being held up by intense artillery and machinegun fire, 1st Sgt. Anderson, without aid, voluntarily left the company and worked his way to the rear of the nest that was offering the most stubborn resistance. His advance was made through an open area and under constant hostile fire, but the mission was successfully accomplished, and he not only silenced the gun and captured it, but also brought back with him 23 prisoners.

== See also ==
- List of Medal of Honor recipients
- List of Medal of Honor recipients for World War I
