= Louis Wardlaw Miles =

American military officer (1873–1944)

- Born: March 23, 1873; Baltimore, Maryland, US
- Died: June 26, 1944 (aged 71)
- Burial place: Green Mount Cemetery
- Military career
- Branch: United States Army
- Rank: Captain
- Units: 308th Infantry, 77th Division
- Conflicts: World War I
- Awards: Medal of Honor

Louis Wardlaw Miles (March 23, 1873 – June 26, 1944), was a World War I Medal of Honor recipient.

== Biography ==
Louis Miles was born in 1873 in Baltimore, Maryland. He studied at Johns Hopkins University and the University of Maryland, earning degrees in both medicine and English. In 1917, while teaching as an assistant professor at Princeton University, he was granted a leave of absence and joined the Army. He served as an officer in the United States Army during World War I and achieved the rank of captain in the 308th Infantry, 77th Division. He was awarded the Medal of Honor for his bravery in action near Revillon, France on September 14, 1918. He returned to teaching after the war, becoming a professor at Johns Hopkins University. He is buried in Green Mount Cemetery, Baltimore, Maryland.

== Medal of Honor citation ==
Rank and organization. Captain, U.S. Army, 308th Infantry, 77th Division. Place and date: Near Revillon, France, September 14, 1918. Entered service at: Princeton, N.J. Born: March 23, 1873, Baltimore, Md. G.O. No.: 44, W.D., 1919.

Citation:

Volunteered to lead his company in a hazardous attack on a commanding trench position near the Aisne Canal, which other troops had previously attempted to take without success. His company immediately met with intense machinegun fire, against which it had no artillery assistance, but Capt. Miles preceded the first wave and assisted in cutting a passage through the enemy's wire entanglements. In so doing he was wounded 5 times by machinegun bullets, both legs and 1 arm being fractured, whereupon he ordered himself placed on a stretcher and had himself carried forward to the enemy trench in order that he might encourage and direct his company, which by this time had suffered numerous casualties. Under the inspiration of this officer's indomitable spirit his men held the hostile position and consolidated the front line after an action lasting 2 hours, at the conclusion of which Capt. Miles was carried to the aid station against his will.

== See also ==
- List of Medal of Honor recipients
- List of Medal of Honor recipients for World War I

== Bibliography ==
- Willbanks, James H. (2011). America's Heroes: Medal of Honor Recipients from the Civil War to Afghanistan. Santa Barbara, California: ABC-Clio. ISBN 978-1-5988-4394-1.
