= Sterling L. Morelock =

American soldier and Medal of Honor recipient

- Medal of Honor
- Born: June 5, 1890; Silver Run, Maryland, US
- Died: September 1, 1964 (aged 74)
- Burial place: Arlington National Cemetery, Section 35
- Military career
- Allegiance: United States of America
- Branch: United States Army
- Rank: Private
- Service number: 2661521
- Units: Company M, 28th Infantry Regiment, 1st Infantry Division
- Conflicts: World War I
- Awards: Medal of Honor

Sterling Lewis Morelock (June 5, 1890 – September 1, 1964) was a United States Army soldier and a recipient of the United States military's highest decoration, the Medal of Honor, for his actions in France during World War I.

Morelock's wounds took a heavy toll on his body and he spent over ten years receiving treatment afterward. He was active with Veteran's affairs including work as a Veteran's Administration employee until his retirement in 1962

== Medal of Honor citation ==
Rank and organization: Private, U.S. Army, Company M, 28th Infantry, 1st Division. Place and date: Near Exermont, France, 4 October 1918. Entered service at: Oquawka, Ill. Birth: Silver Run, Md. G.O. No.: 43, W.D., 1922.

Citation: While his company was being held up by heavy enemy fire, Pvt. Morelock, with 3 other men who were acting as runners at company headquarters, voluntarily led them as a patrol in advance of his company's frontline through an intense rifle, artillery, and machinegun fire and penetrated a woods which formed the German frontline. Encountering a series of 5 hostile machinegun nests, containing from 1 to 5 machineguns each, with his patrol he cleaned them all out, gained and held complete mastery of the situation until the arrival of his company commander with reinforcements, even though his entire party had become casualties. He rendered first aid to the injured and evacuated them by using stretcher bearers 10 German prisoners whom he had captured. Soon thereafter his company commander was wounded and while dressing his wound Pvt. Morelock was very severely wounded in the hip, which forced his evacuation. His heroic action and devotion to duty were an inspiration to the entire regiment.

== See also ==
- List of Medal of Honor recipients
- List of Medal of Honor recipients for World War I
