= Michael A. Donaldson =

United States Army sergeant

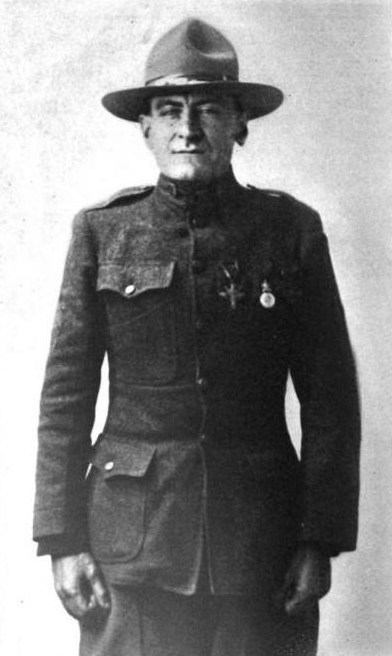
- Sergeant Michael A. Donaldson
- Born: January 16, 1884; Haverstraw, New York
- Died: April 12, 1970 (aged 86); Montrose, New York
- Burial place: Saint Peters Cemetery, Haverstraw, New York
- Military career
- Allegiance: United States of America
- Branch: United States Army
- Rank: Sergeant
- Service number: 89868
- Units: Company I, 165th Infantry Regiment, 42nd Division
- Conflicts: World War I
- Awards: Medal of Honor

Michael Aloysius Donaldson (January 16, 1884 – April 12, 1970) was a United States Army sergeant and a recipient of the United States military's highest decoration, the Medal of Honor, for his actions in France during World War I. He was a member of the Irish-American 165th Infantry Regiment (better known as "The Fighting 69th"). In addition to the Medal of Honor, Donaldson also received decorations from France and Montenegro and participated in the Champagne-Marne, Aisne-Marne, St. Mihiel, Meuse-Argonne and Defensive Sector campaigns.

== Medal of Honor Citation ==
Rank and organization: Sergeant, U.S. Army, Company I, 165th Infantry Regiment, 42nd Division. Place and date: At Sommerance-Landres-et St. Georges Road, France, 14 October 1918. Entered service at: Haverstraw, N.Y. Born: 1884, Haverstraw, N.Y. General Orders: War Department, General Orders No. 9, March 23, 1923.

Citation:

The advance of his regiment having been checked by intense machinegun fire of the enemy, who were entrenched on the crest of a hill before Landres-et St. Georges, his company retired to a sunken road to reorganize their position, leaving several of their number wounded near the enemy lines. Of his own volition, in broad daylight and under direct observation of the enemy and with utter disregard for his own safety, he advanced to the crest of the hill, rescued one of his wounded comrades, and returned under withering fire to his own lines, repeating his splendidly heroic act until he had brought in all the men, 6 in number.

== Military Awards ==
Donaldson's military decorations and awards include:

| 1st row | Medal of Honor | World War I Victory Medal w/one silver service star to denote credit for five campaign clasps | Army of Occupation of Germany Medal |
| 2nd row | Médaille militaire (French Republic) | Croix de guerre 1914–1918 w/bronze palm (French Republic) | Medal for Military Bravery (Kingdom of Montenegro) |

== See also ==
- List of Medal of Honor recipients
- List of Medal of Honor recipients for World War I
