= Dwite H. Schaffner =

- Born: November 5, 1889; Arroyo, Pennsylvania
- Died: November 22, 1955 (aged 66)
- Burial place: Rose Hill Burial Park Akron, Ohio
- Military career
- Allegiance: United States of America
- Branch: United States Army
- Rank: First Lieutenant
- Units: 306th Infantry, 77th Division
- Conflicts: World War I
- Awards: Medal of Honor

Dwite H. Schaffner (November 5, 1889 – November 22, 1955) was a soldier in the United States Army who received the Medal of Honor for his actions during World War I.

== Biography ==
Schaffner was born in Arroyo, Pennsylvania, on November 5, 1889, and died November 22, 1955. He is buried in Rose Hill Burial Park Akron, Ohio.

== Medal of Honor citation ==
Rank and organization: First Lieutenant, U.S. Army, 306th Infantry, 77th Division. Place and date: Near St. Hubert's Pavilion, Boureuilles, France, September 28, 1918. Entered service at: Falls Creek, Pa. Birth: Arroya, Pa. G.O. No.: 15, W.D., 1923.

Citation:

He led his men in an attack on St. Hubert's Pavillion through terrific enemy machinegun, rifle, and artillery fire and drove the enemy from a strongly held entrenched position after hand-to-hand fighting. His bravery and contempt for danger inspired his men, enabling them to hold fast in the face of 3 determined enemy counterattacks. His company's position being exposed to enemy fire from both flanks, he made 3 efforts to locate an enemy machinegun which had caused heavy casualties. On his third reconnaissance he discovered the gun position and personally silenced the gun, killing or wounding the crew. The third counterattack made by the enemy was initiated by the appearance of a small detachment in advance of the enemy attacking wave. When almost within reach of the American front line the enemy appeared behind them, attacking vigorously with pistols, rifles, and handgrenades, causing heavy casualties in the American platoon. 1st Lt. Schaffner mounted the parapet of the trench and used his pistol and grenades killing a number of enemy soldiers, finally reaching the enemy officer leading the attacking forces, a captain, shooting and mortally wounding the latter with his pistol, and dragging the captured officer back to the company's trench, securing from him valuable information as to the enemy's strength and position. The information enabled 1st Lt. Schaffner to maintain for 8 hours the advanced position of his company despite the fact that it was surrounded on 3 sides by strong enemy forces. The undaunted bravery, gallant soldierly conduct, and leadership displayed by 1st Lt. Schaffner undoubtedly saved the survivors of the company from death or capture.

== See also ==
- List of Medal of Honor recipients
- List of Medal of Honor recipients for World War I
