= Bantheville =

- Commune
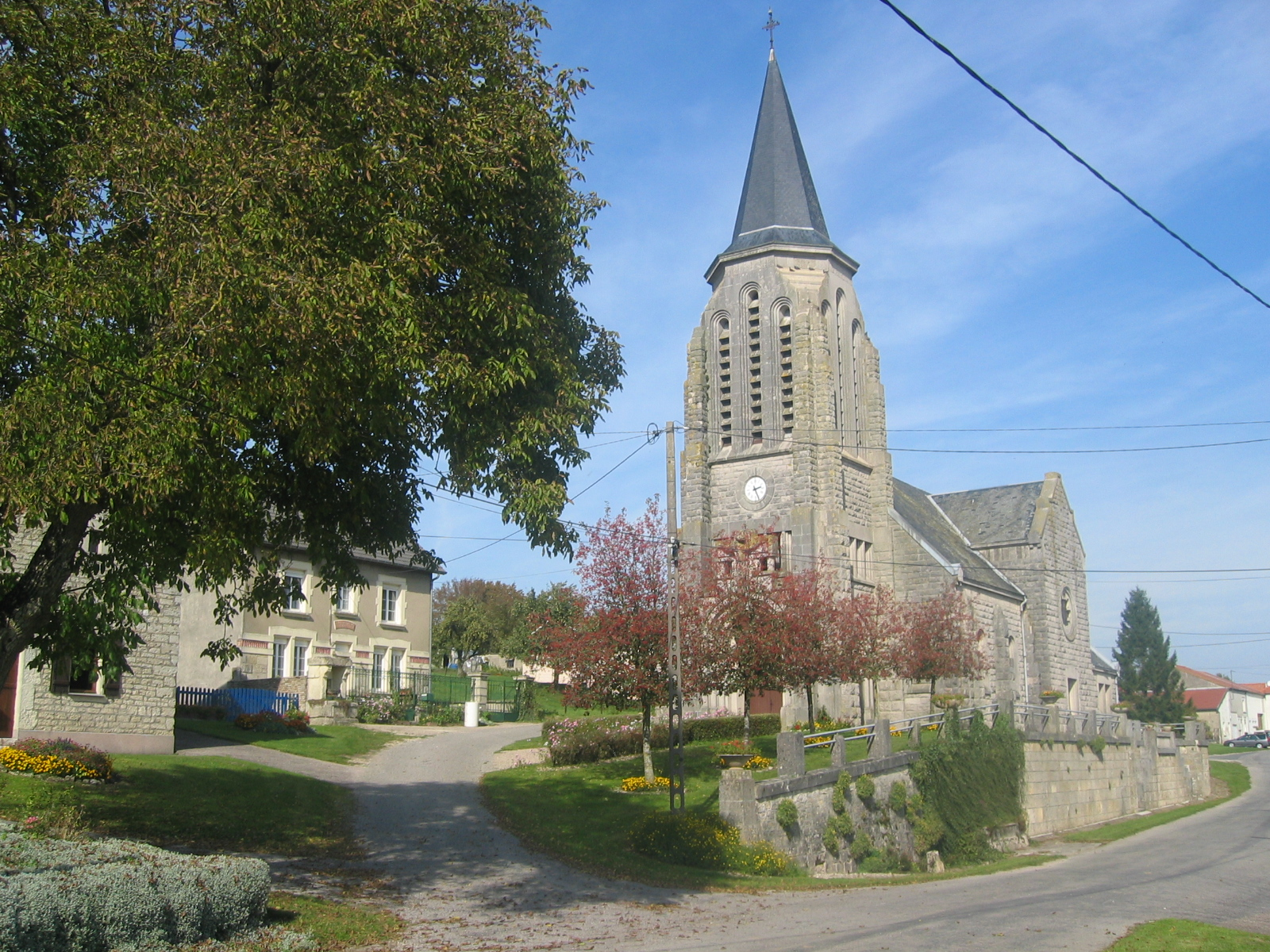
- The church in Bantheville

- Coat of arms
- Location of Bantheville
- Location within France Location within Grand Est
- Coordinates: 49°21′16″N 5°05′23″E
- Country: France
- Region: Grand Est
- Department: Meuse
- Arrondissement: Verdun
- Canton: Clermont-en-Argonne
- Intercommunality: CC du Pays de Stenay et du Val Dunois

Government
  - Mayor (2020–2026): André Cornette
- Area^{1}: 14.28 km^{2} (5.51 sq mi)
- Elevation: 250 m (820 ft)
- Highest elevation: 277 m (909 ft)
- Lowest elevation: 194 m (636 ft)
- Population (2023): 102
  - Density: 7.14/km^{2} (18.5/sq mi)
- Time zone: UTC+01:00 (CET)
  - Summer (DST): UTC+02:00 (CEST)
- INSEE/Postal code: 55028 /55110
- ^{1} French Land Register data, which excludes lakes, ponds, glaciers > 1 km^{2} (0.386 sq mi or 247 acres) and river estuaries.

Bantheville (French pronunciation: [bɑ̃tvil]) is a commune in the Meuse department in the Grand Est region in northeastern France.

== Population ==
Historical population
Year	Pop.	±% p.a.
1968	144	—
1975	128	−1.67%
1982	133	+0.55%
1990	139	+0.55%
1999	140	+0.08%
2007	134	−0.55%
2012	132	−0.30%
2017	119	−2.05%
2023	102	−2.54%
Source: INSEE

== See also ==
- Communes of the Meuse department
