= Harold A. Furlong =

United States Army soldier

Harold Arthur Furlong
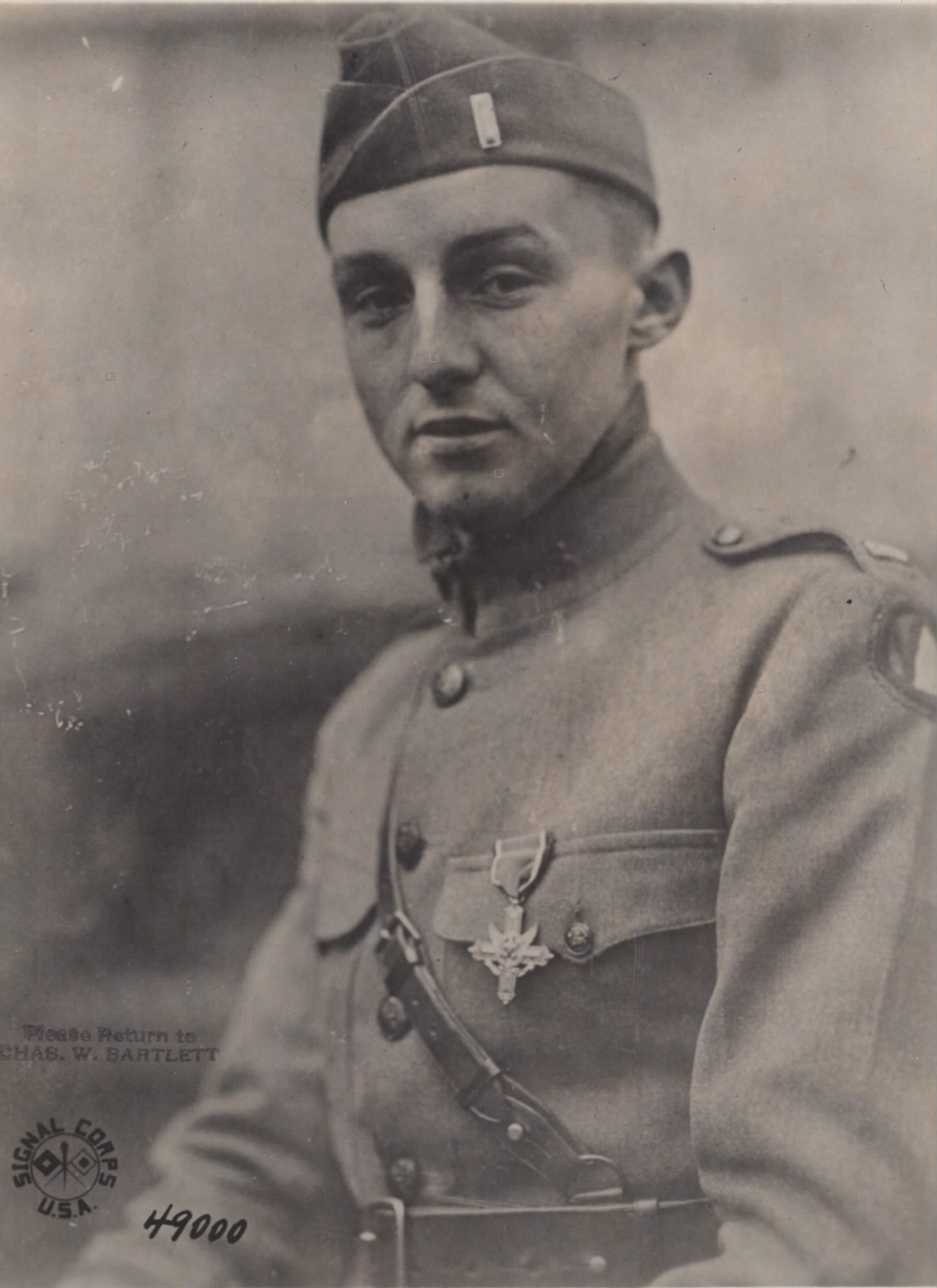
- Born: August 25, 1895; Pontiac, Michigan
- Died: July 27, 1987 (aged 91); Clarkston, Michigan
- Burial place: Oak Hill Cemetery, Pontiac, Michigan
- Military career
- Allegiance: United States of America
- Branch: United States Army
- Rank: Colonel
- Units: 353d Infantry Regiment, 89th Division
- Conflicts: World War I
- Awards: Medal of Honor

Harold Arthur Furlong (August 25, 1895 – July 27, 1987) was a United States Army First Lieutenant and a recipient of the United States military's highest decoration, the Medal of Honor, for his actions in France during World War I. He also received the Croix de guerre with palms and was made a Chevalier of the Legion of Honor.

He joined the Michigan National Guard in December 1921, retiring as a lieutenant colonel in May 1946. During World War II, he served as an Army surgeon in Germany.

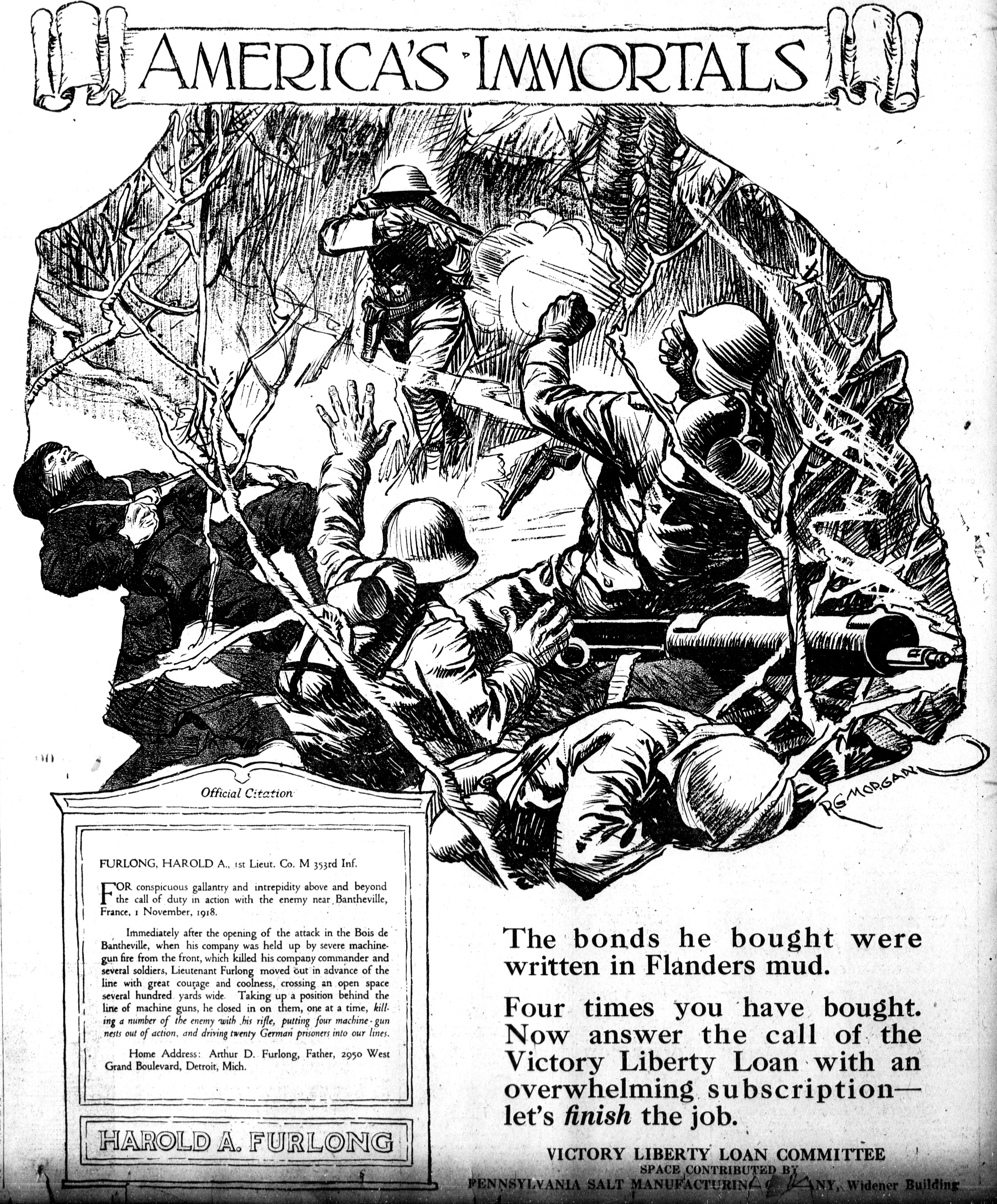
Furlong storming a machine gun nest on November 1, 1918

== Medal of Honor Citation ==
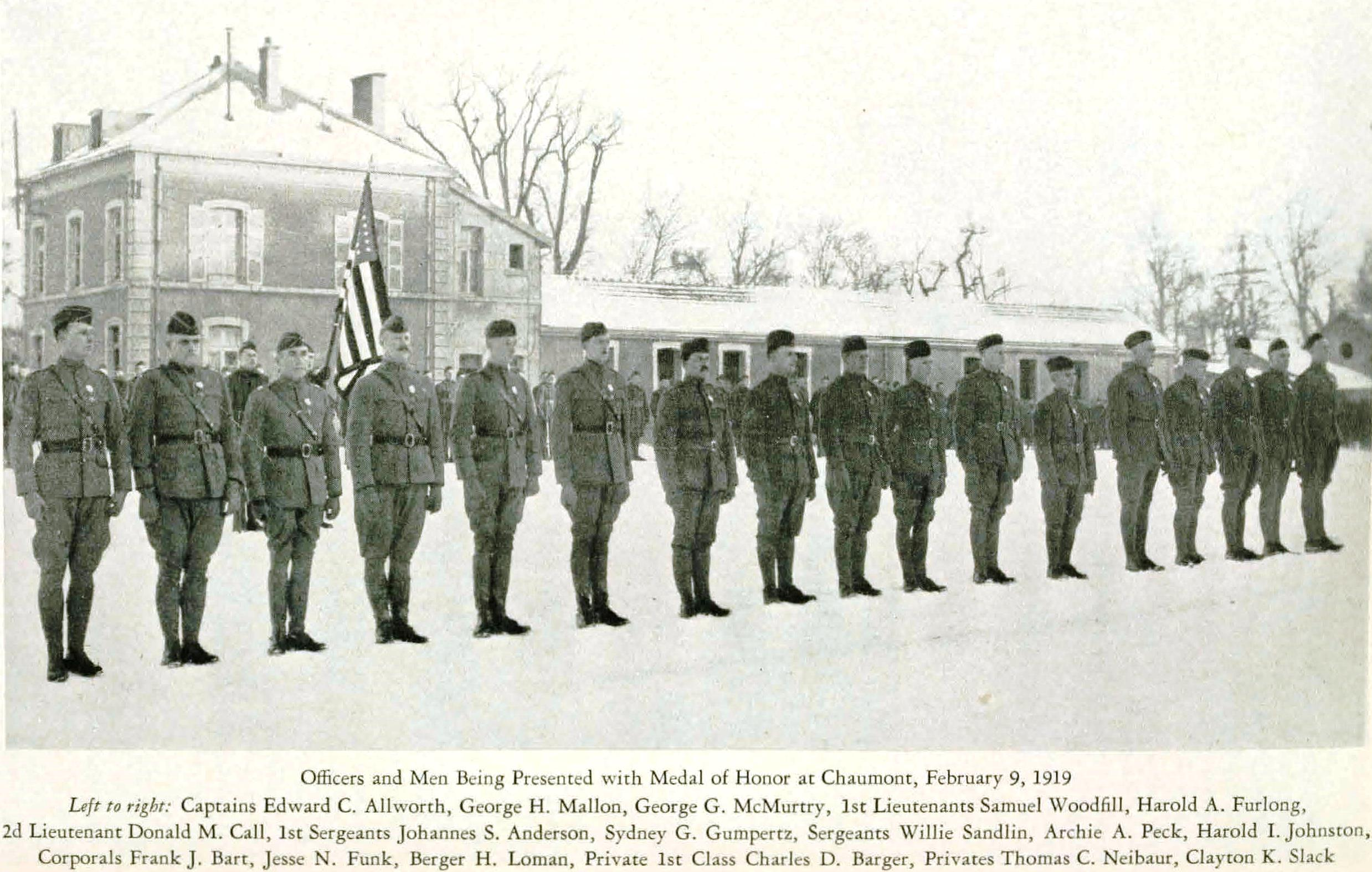
Medal of Honor Presentation Ceremony - February 9, 1919, at Chaumont, France. General John J. Pershing presided.

Rank and organization: First Lieutenant, U.S. Army, 353d Infantry, 89th Division. Place and date: Near Bantheville, France, 1 November 1918. Entered service at: Detroit, Mich. Birth: Pontiac, Mich. G.O. No.: 16, W.D., 1919:

Citation: Immediately after the opening of the attack in the Bois-de-Bantheville, when his company was held up by severe machinegun fire from the front, which killed his company commander and several soldiers, 1st. Lt. Furlong moved out in advance of the line with great courage and coolness, crossing an open space several hundred yards wide. Taking up a position behind the line of the machineguns, he closed in on them, one at a time, killing a number of the enemy with his rifle, putting 4 machinegun nests out of action, and driving 20 German prisoners into our lines.

== Civilian life ==
Furlong graduated from the University of Michigan Medical College in 1924, and worked as an obstetrician in Pontiac, Michigan for over 50 years.

In 1964, he founded the Pontiac Creative Arts Center.

He died in Clarkston on July 27, 1987, and was buried at Oak Hill Cemetery.

== See also ==
- List of Medal of Honor recipients
- List of Medal of Honor recipients for World War I
