= Montbrehain =

- Commune
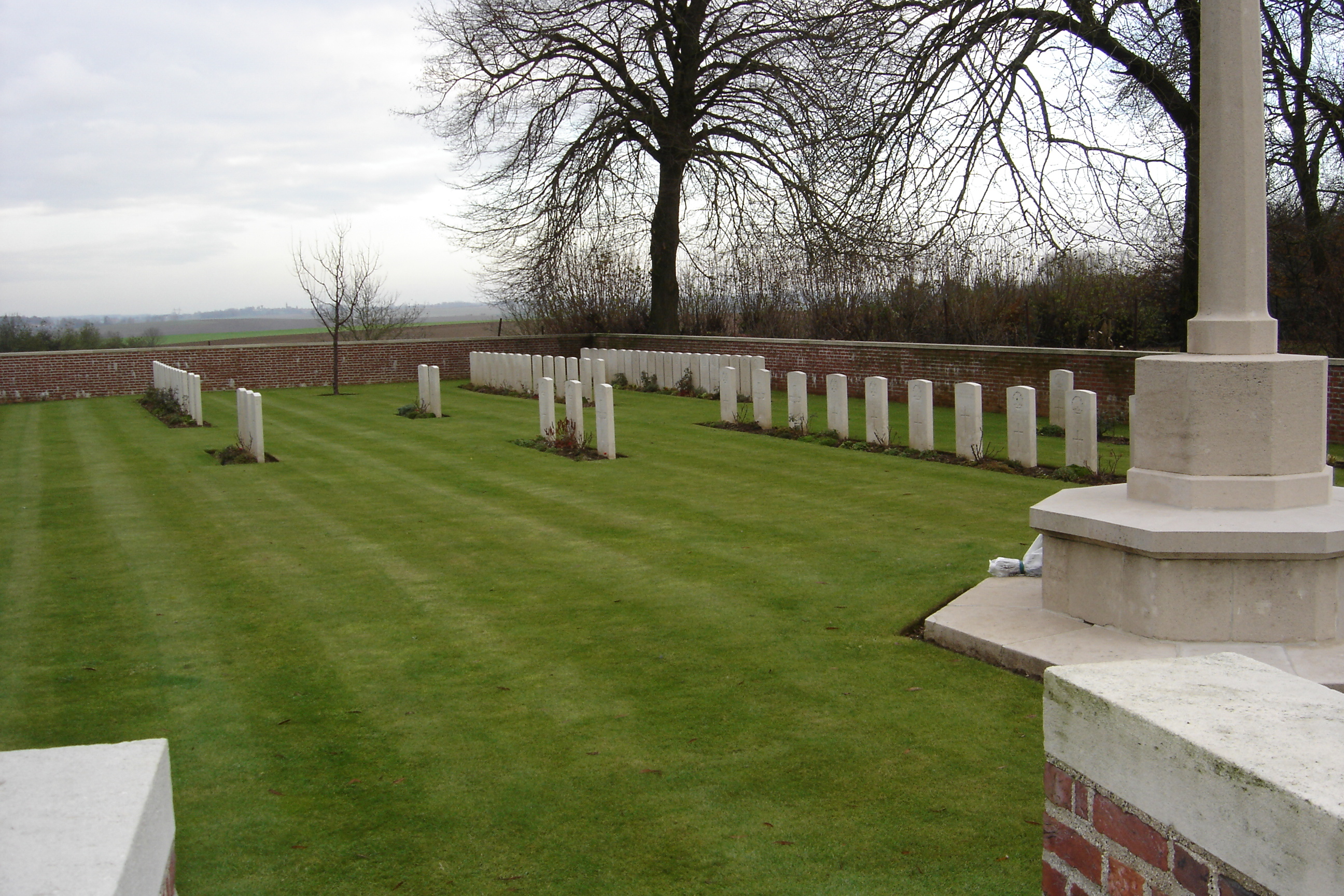
- Military cemetery

- Coat of arms
- Location of Montbrehain
- Location within France Location within Hauts-de-France
- Coordinates: 49°58′03″N 3°21′05″E
- Country: France
- Region: Hauts-de-France
- Department: Aisne
- Arrondissement: Saint-Quentin
- Canton: Bohain-en-Vermandois
- Intercommunality: Pays du Vermandois

Government
  - Mayor (2026–32): Christophe Thiery
- Area^{1}: 9.9 km^{2} (3.8 sq mi)
- Elevation: 141 m (463 ft)
- Highest elevation: 156 m (512 ft)
- Lowest elevation: 116 m (381 ft)
- Population (2023): 816
  - Density: 82/km^{2} (210/sq mi)
- Time zone: UTC+01:00 (CET)
  - Summer (DST): UTC+02:00 (CEST)
- INSEE/Postal code: 02500 /02110
- ^{1} French Land Register data, which excludes lakes, ponds, glaciers > 1 km^{2} (0.386 sq mi or 247 acres) and river estuaries.

Montbrehain (French pronunciation: [mɔ̃bʁəɛ̃]) is a commune in the Aisne department in Hauts-de-France in northern France.

== Population ==
Historical population
Year	Pop.	±% p.a.
1968	1,064	—
1975	986	−1.08%
1982	926	−0.89%
1990	898	−0.38%
1999	909	+0.14%
2007	809	−1.45%
2012	835	+0.63%
2017	810	−0.61%
2023	816	+0.12%
Source: INSEE

== See also ==
- Communes of the Aisne department
