= Exermont =

- Commune
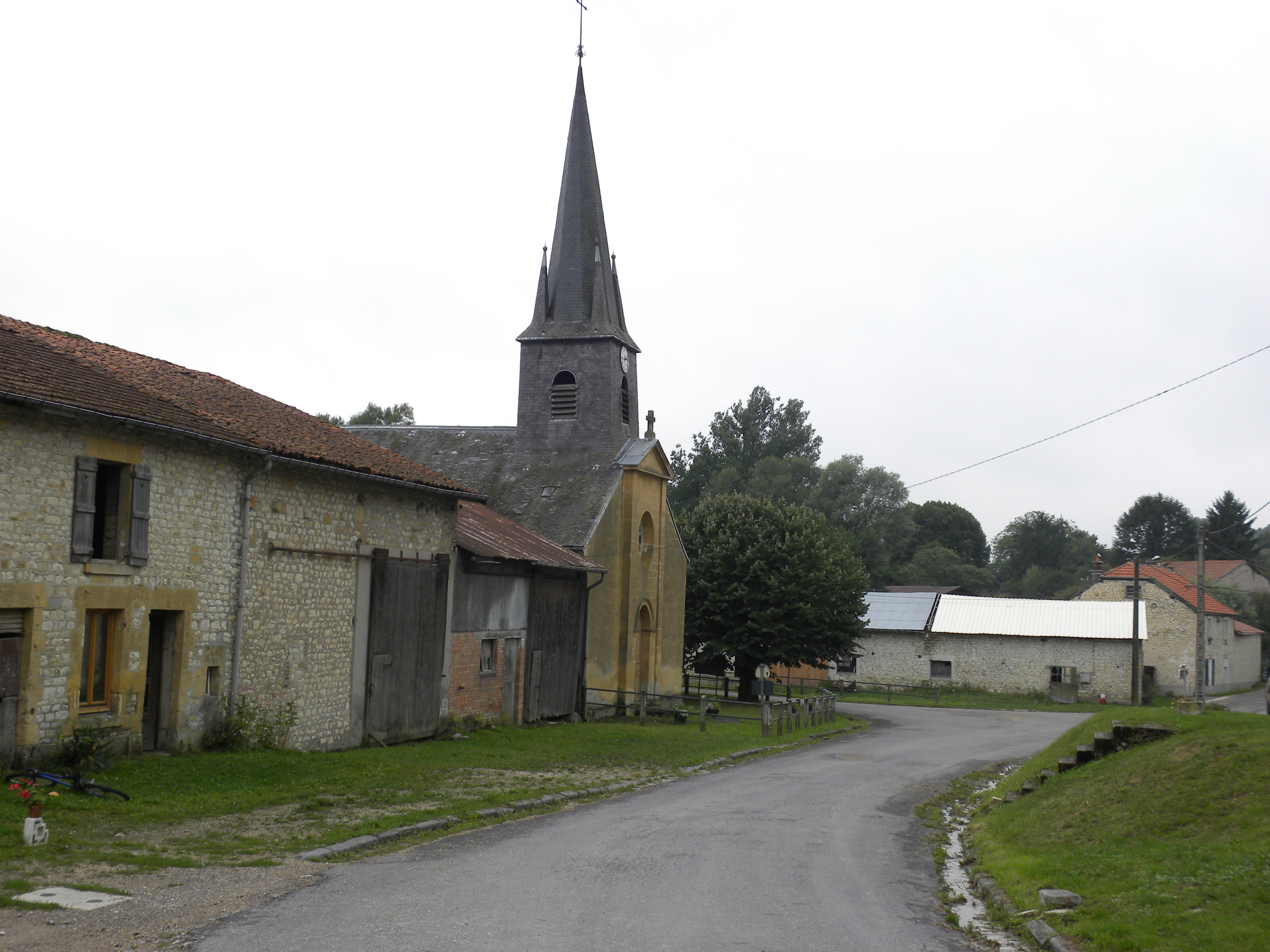
- The church and surroundings in Exermont
- Location of Exermont
- Location within France Location within Grand Est
- Coordinates: 49°17′43″N 5°00′24″E
- Country: France
- Region: Grand Est
- Department: Ardennes
- Arrondissement: Vouziers
- Canton: Attigny
- Intercommunality: Argonne Ardennaise

Government
  - Mayor (2020–2026): Sylvain Nizet
- Area^{1}: 18.29 km^{2} (7.06 sq mi)
- Elevation: 155 m (509 ft)
- Highest elevation: 262 m (860 ft)
- Lowest elevation: 141 m (463 ft)
- Population (2023): 32
  - Density: 1.7/km^{2} (4.5/sq mi)
- Time zone: UTC+01:00 (CET)
  - Summer (DST): UTC+02:00 (CEST)
- INSEE/Postal code: 08161 /08250
- ^{1} French Land Register data, which excludes lakes, ponds, glaciers > 1 km^{2} (0.386 sq mi or 247 acres) and river estuaries.

Exermont (French pronunciation: [ɛɡzɛʁmɔ̃]) is a commune in the Ardennes department in northern France.

== Population ==
Historical population
| Year | Pop. | ±% p.a. |
|---|---|---|
| 1968 | 56 | — |
| 1975 | 53 | −0.78% |
| 1982 | 49 | −1.11% |
| 1990 | 38 | −3.13% |
| 1999 | 32 | −1.89% |
| 2007 | 33 | +0.39% |
| 2012 | 43 | +5.44% |
| 2017 | 42 | −0.47% |
| 2023 | 32 | −4.43% |
Source: INSEE

== See also ==
- Communes of the Ardennes department
