= Consenvoye =

- Commune
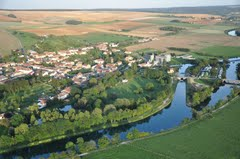
- A general view of Consenvoye

- Coat of arms
- Location of Consenvoye
- Location within France Location within Grand Est
- Coordinates: 49°17′16″N 5°17′12″E
- Country: France
- Region: Grand Est
- Department: Meuse
- Arrondissement: Verdun
- Canton: Clermont-en-Argonne
- Intercommunality: Argonne-Meuse

Government
  - Mayor (2020–2026): André Dormois
- Area^{1}: 15.85 km^{2} (6.12 sq mi)
- Elevation: 184 m (604 ft)
- Highest elevation: 382 m (1,253 ft)
- Lowest elevation: 179 m (587 ft)
- Population (2023): 281
  - Density: 17.7/km^{2} (45.9/sq mi)
- Time zone: UTC+01:00 (CET)
  - Summer (DST): UTC+02:00 (CEST)
- INSEE/Postal code: 55124 /55110
- ^{1} French Land Register data, which excludes lakes, ponds, glaciers > 1 km^{2} (0.386 sq mi or 247 acres) and river estuaries.

Consenvoye (French pronunciation: [kɔ̃sɑ̃vwa]) is a commune in the Meuse department in Grand Est in north-eastern France.

== See also ==
- Communes of the Meuse department
