= Fred E. Smith =

United States Army Medal of Honor recipient

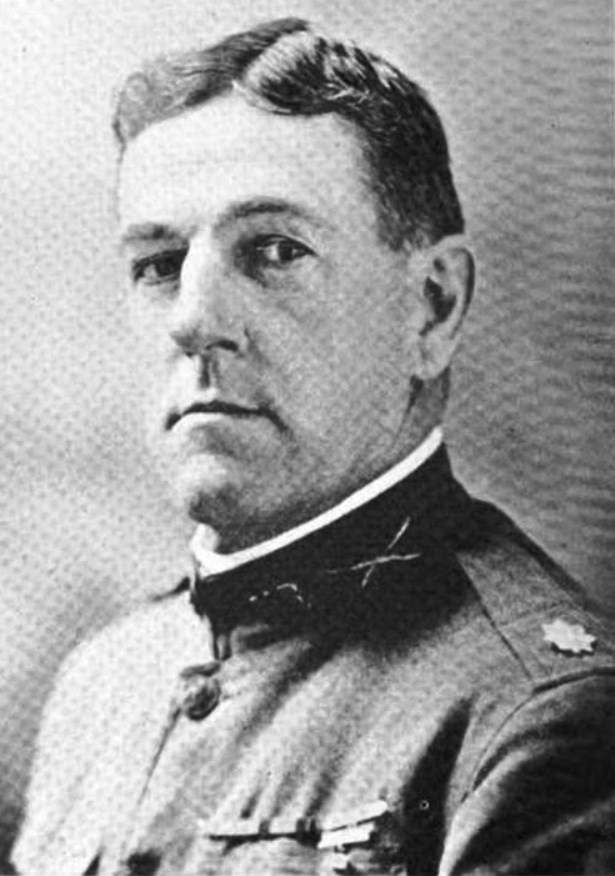
- Medal of Honor recipient
- Born: March 29, 1873; Rockford, Illinois
- Died: September 29, 1918 (aged 45); Binarville, France
- Burial place: Meuse-Argonne American Cemetery, Romagne-sous-Montfaucon, France
- Military career
- Allegiance: United States
- Branch: United States Army
- Service years: 1898–1918
- Rank: Lieutenant Colonel
- Commands: 308th Regiment, 77th Division
- Conflicts: Spanish–American War; World War I
- Awards: Medal of Honor

Fred Eliphaz Smith (March 29, 1873 – September 29, 1918) was a United States Army officer and a posthumous recipient of the U.S. military's highest decoration, the Medal of Honor. He was born in Rockford, Illinois, and graduated from the University of North Dakota in the spring of 1894. He first joined the national guard in 1898, later transferring to the regular army in 1899.

He was promoted to major due a lack of capable officers when the US joined World War I. On September 29, 1918, near Binarville, France, Smith showed conspicuous leadership until being mortally wounded. For these actions, he was posthumously awarded the Medal of Honor four years later, on November 25, 1922. Smith died at the rank of lieutenant colonel.

== Military service ==
Smith joined the North Dakota National Guard in April 1898 and was assigned to Company D, which drilled in Devils Lake, North Dakota. On May 16, 1898, the Guard promoted him to regimental sergeant major and on June 21, transferred him to Company K in Dickinson, North Dakota. With the outbreak of the Spanish–American War, the eight North Dakota National Guard units were formed into the 1st Infantry Regiment and sent to Manila Bay in the Philippines in July 1898. On February 6, 1899, the U.S. Senate approved the terms of the peace treaty, ending the war with Spain. However, the fighting was not over. Rebel leader Emilio Aguinaldo led an insurrection movement against the American forces. Smith was summoned to Manila and notified that the next day he would be given an exam prepared by West Point instructors to determine if he would qualify to be an officer in the Regular Army. He aced the test and was commissioned a second lieutenant on February 24. On July 26, 1899, Smith was transferred to the 36th U.S. Volunteers. After the Americans defeated Aguinaldo, Smith returned to the United States. During his stateside service, he rose to the rank of captain in the U.S. Army.

After the U.S. entered World War I in April 1917, it needed qualified officers. The army noticed Smith's leadership ability and promoted him to major on August 3, 1917, then to lieutenant colonel on August 29. He was assigned to the 15th Infantry and sailed to England on April 25, 1918. Smith arrived in France on May 14, was transferred to the 77th Division on July 12, and went to the front lines on July 17.

On September 29, 1918, near Binarville, France, Smith showed conspicuous leadership until being mortally wounded. For these actions, he was posthumously awarded the Medal of Honor four years later, on November 25, 1922.

== Medal of Honor Citation ==
Rank and organization: Lieutenant Colonel, U.S. Army, 308th Infantry, 77th Division. Place and date: At Binarville, France; September 29, 1918. Entered service at: Bartlett, North Dakota. Born: March 29, 1873; Rockford, Illinois. General Orders: War Department, General Orders No. 49, November 25, 1922.

Citation:

When communication from the forward regimental post of command to the battalion leading the advance had been interrupted temporarily by the infiltration of small parties of the enemy armed with machineguns, Lieutenant Colonel Smith personally led a party of two other officers and ten soldiers, and went forward to reestablish runner posts and carry ammunition to the front line. The guide became confused and the party strayed to the left flank beyond the outposts of supporting troops, suddenly coming under fire from a group of enemy machineguns only 50 yards away. Shouting to the other members of his party to take cover this officer, in disregard of his danger, drew his pistol and opened fire on the German gun crew. About this time he fell, severely wounded in the side, but regaining his footing, he continued to fire on the enemy until most of the men in his party were out of danger. Refusing first-aid treatment he then made his way in plain view of the enemy to a hand grenade dump and returned under continued heavy machinegun fire for the purpose of making another attack on the enemy emplacements. As he was attempting to ascertain the exact location of the nearest nest, he again fell, mortally wounded.

== Military Awards ==
Smith's military decorations and awards include:

1st row	Medal of Honor		
2nd row	Spanish Campaign Medal	Philippine Campaign Medal	World War I Victory Medal w/three bronze service stars to denote credit for the Oise-Aisne, Meuse-Argonne and Defensive Sector battle clasps.
3rd row	Ordre national de la Légion d'honneur degree of Officer (French Republic)	Croix de guerre 1914–1918 w/bronze palm (French Republic)	Croce al Merito di Guerra (Italy)

== See also ==
- List of Medal of Honor recipients for World War I
