= Meuse-Argonne American Cemetery =

Military cemetery in France

- Cimetière Américain (Meuse-Argonne)
- American Battle Monuments Commission
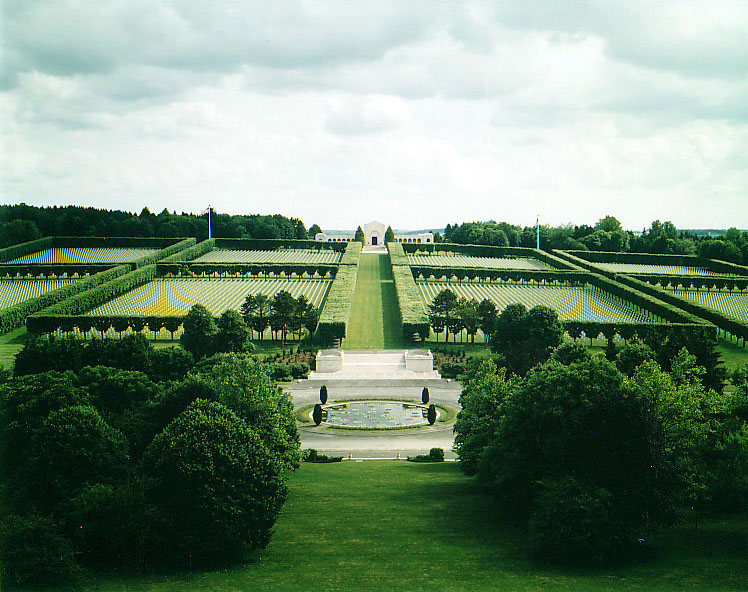
- Tombstones and the reflecting pool
- For the AEF, American Forces in Germany (1919–23), and AEF in North Russia (1918–19) dead and missing
- Established: October 14, 1918
- Unveiled: May 30, 1937; 88 years ago
- Location: 49°20′03″N 05°05′36″E near Romagne, France
- Designed by: York and Sawyer
- Total burials: 14,246 plus 954 commemorated
- Unknowns: 486

UNESCO World Heritage Site
- Official name: Funerary and memory sites of the First World War (Western Front)
- Type: Cultural
- Criteria: i, ii, vi
- Designated: 2023 (45th session)
- Reference no.: 1567-ME03

The Meuse-Argonne American Cemetery (French: Cimetière Américain (Meuse-Argonne)) is a 130.5-acre (52.8 ha) World War I cemetery in France. It is located east of the village of Romagne-sous-Montfaucon in Meuse. The cemetery contains the largest number of American military dead in Europe (14,246), most of whom lost their lives during the Meuse-Argonne Offensive and were buried there.

The cemetery consists of eight sections behind a large central reflection pool. Beyond the grave sections is a chapel which is decorated with stained glass windows depicting American units' insignias. Along the walls of the chapel area are the tablets of the missing which include the names of those soldiers who fought in the region and in northern Russia, but have no known grave. It also includes the Meuse-Argonne American Memorial. This cemetery is maintained by the American Battle Monuments Commission. It is open daily to the public from 9:00 a.m. to 5:00 p.m. The cemetery is closed January 1 and December 25, but is open on all other holidays.

== Notable burials ==
- Medal of Honor recipients
  - Second Lieutenant Erwin R. Bleckley (1894–1918), for service near Binarville, France
  - Captain Marcellus H. Chiles (1895–1918), for action near Le Champy Bas, France
  - Sergeant Matej Kocak (1882–1918), two-time recipient (Army and Navy medals)
  - Second Lieutenant Frank Luke Jr. (1897–1918), the "Arizona Balloon Buster" and first airman to receive the medal of honor; Luke Air Force Base is named after him
  - Major Oscar F. Miller (1882–1918), for his leadership in the Argonne
  - Corporal Harold W. Roberts (1895–1918), for action in the Montrebeau Woods
  - Sergeant William Sawelson (1895–1918), for action at Grandpré, Ardennes
  - Lieutenant Colonel Fred E. Smith (1873–1918), for action near Binarville, France
  - Corporal Freddie Stowers (1896–1918), for action in the Ardennes (medal awarded in 1991)
- Other notables
  - Sergeant Victor E. Chapman (1890–1916), first American aviator to die in battle in the war
  - Captain Edward L. Grant (1883–1918), pre-war professional baseball player

== Gallery ==
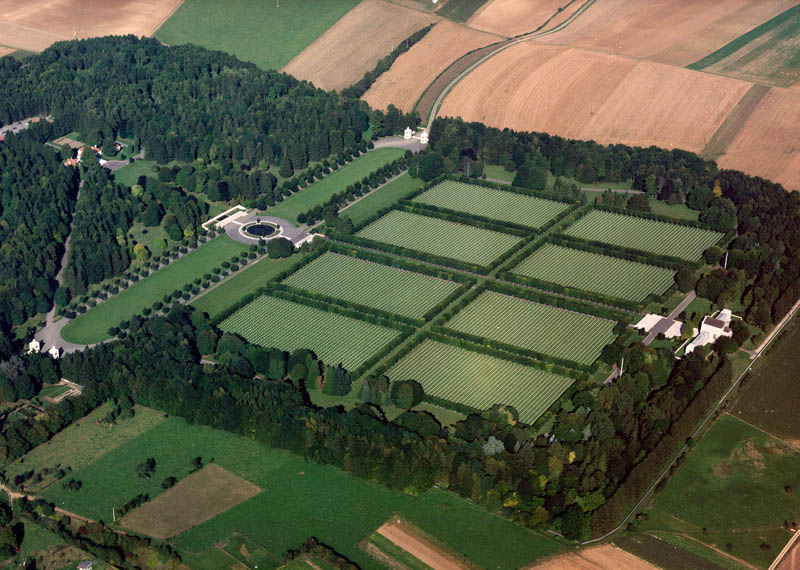
Aerial view of cemetery.

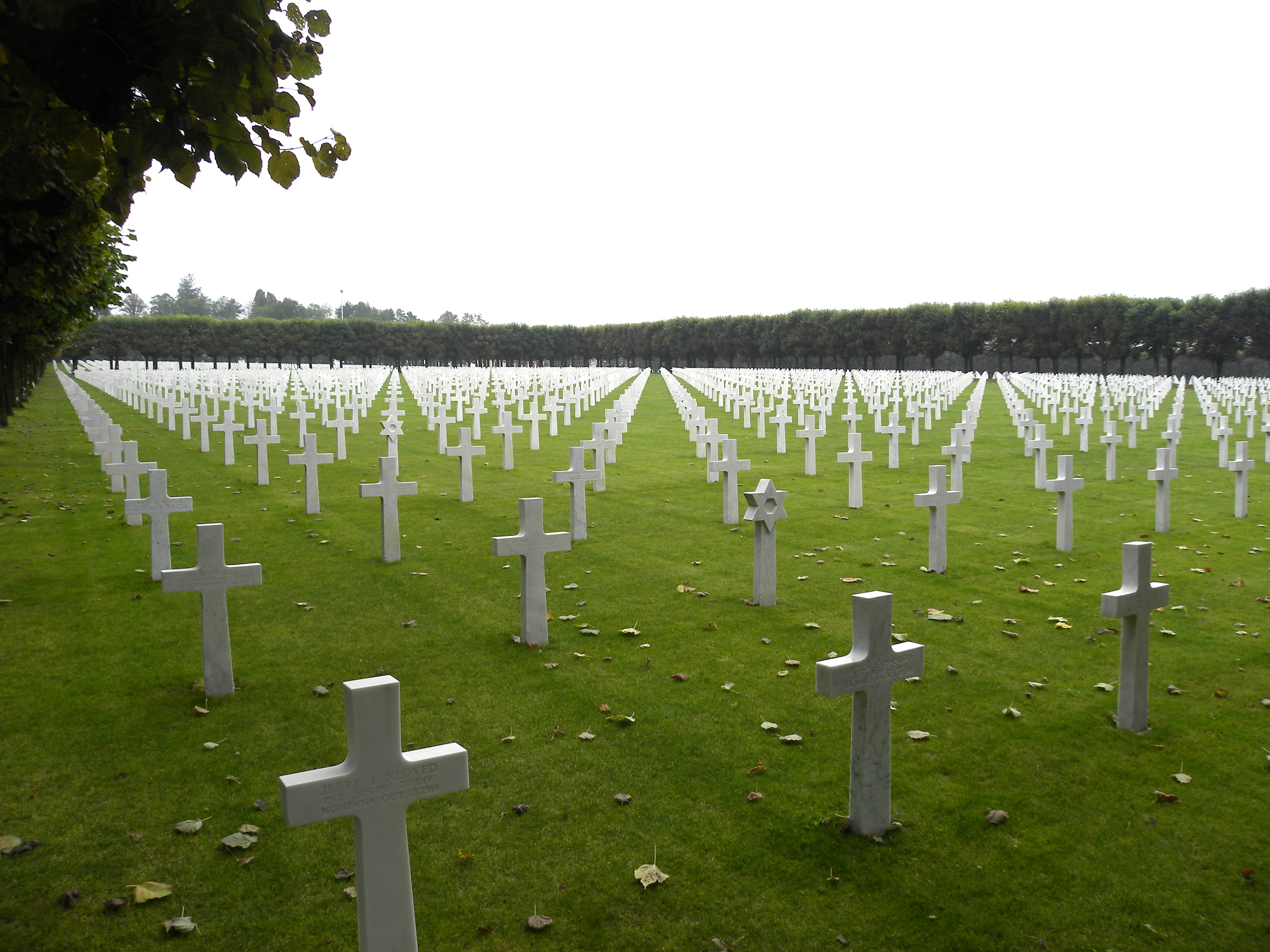
Meuse-Argonne American Cemetery.

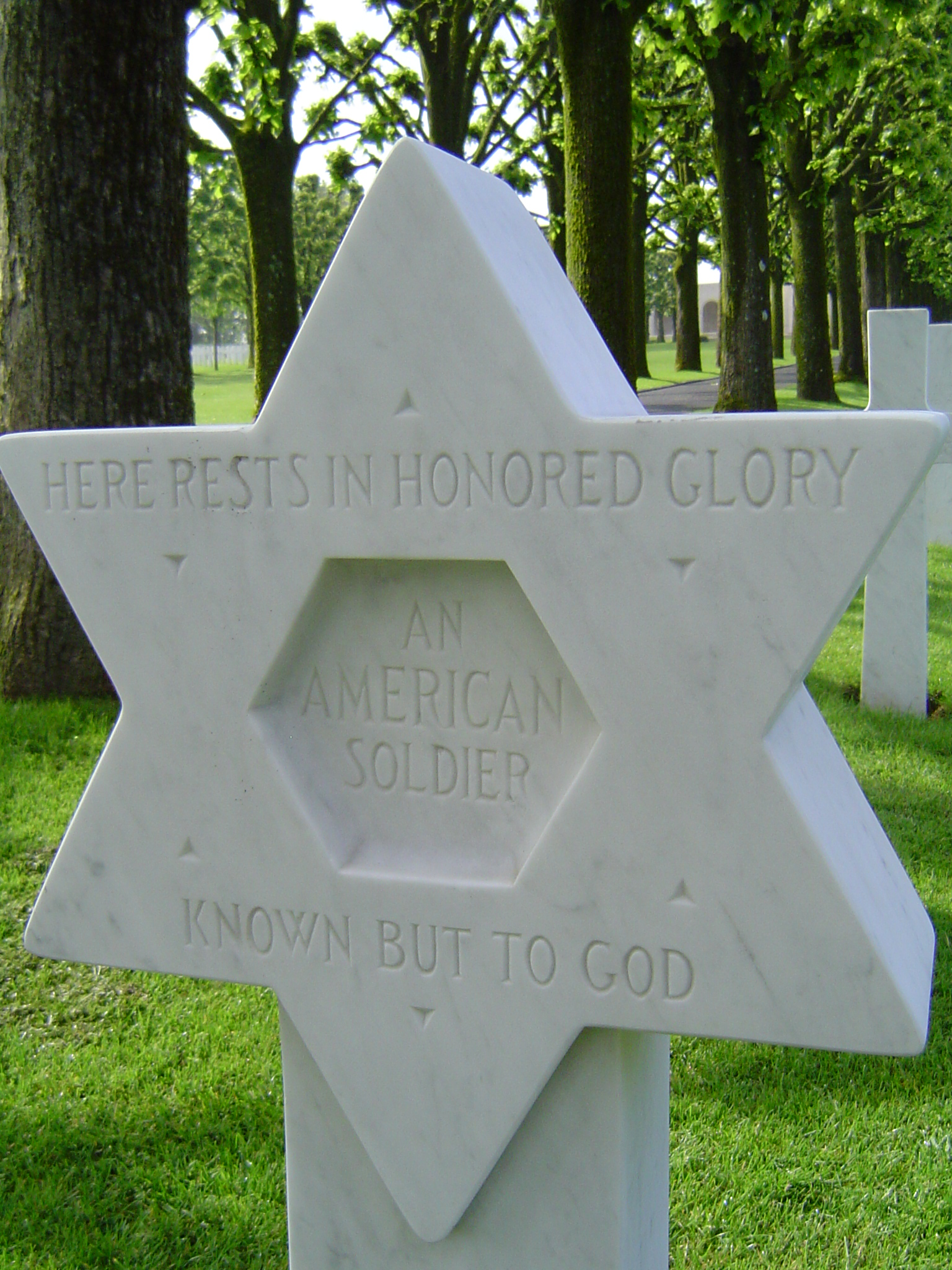
Grave of an unknown Jewish American combatant in the cemetery

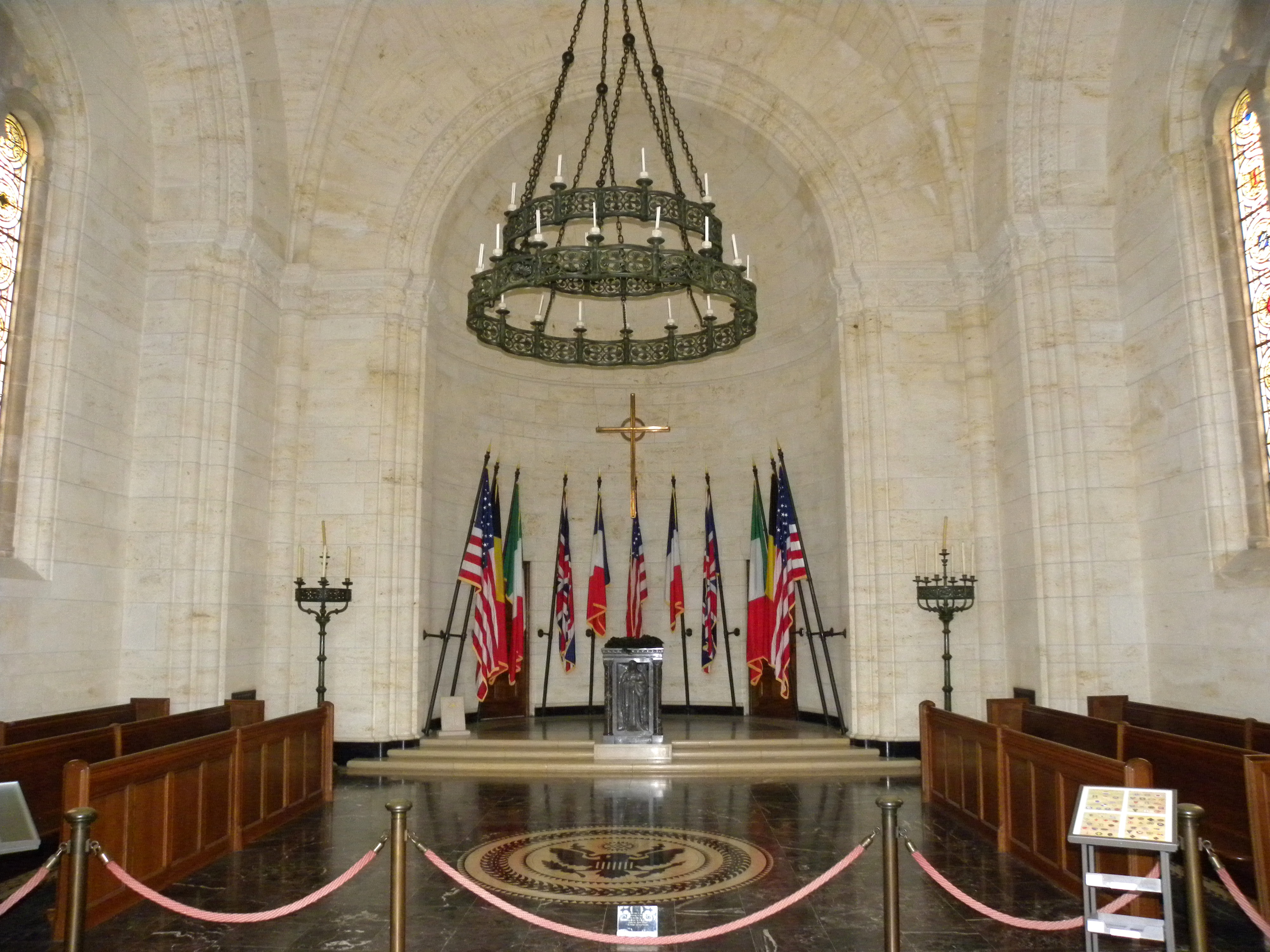
Meuse-Argonne American Cemetery Chapel.

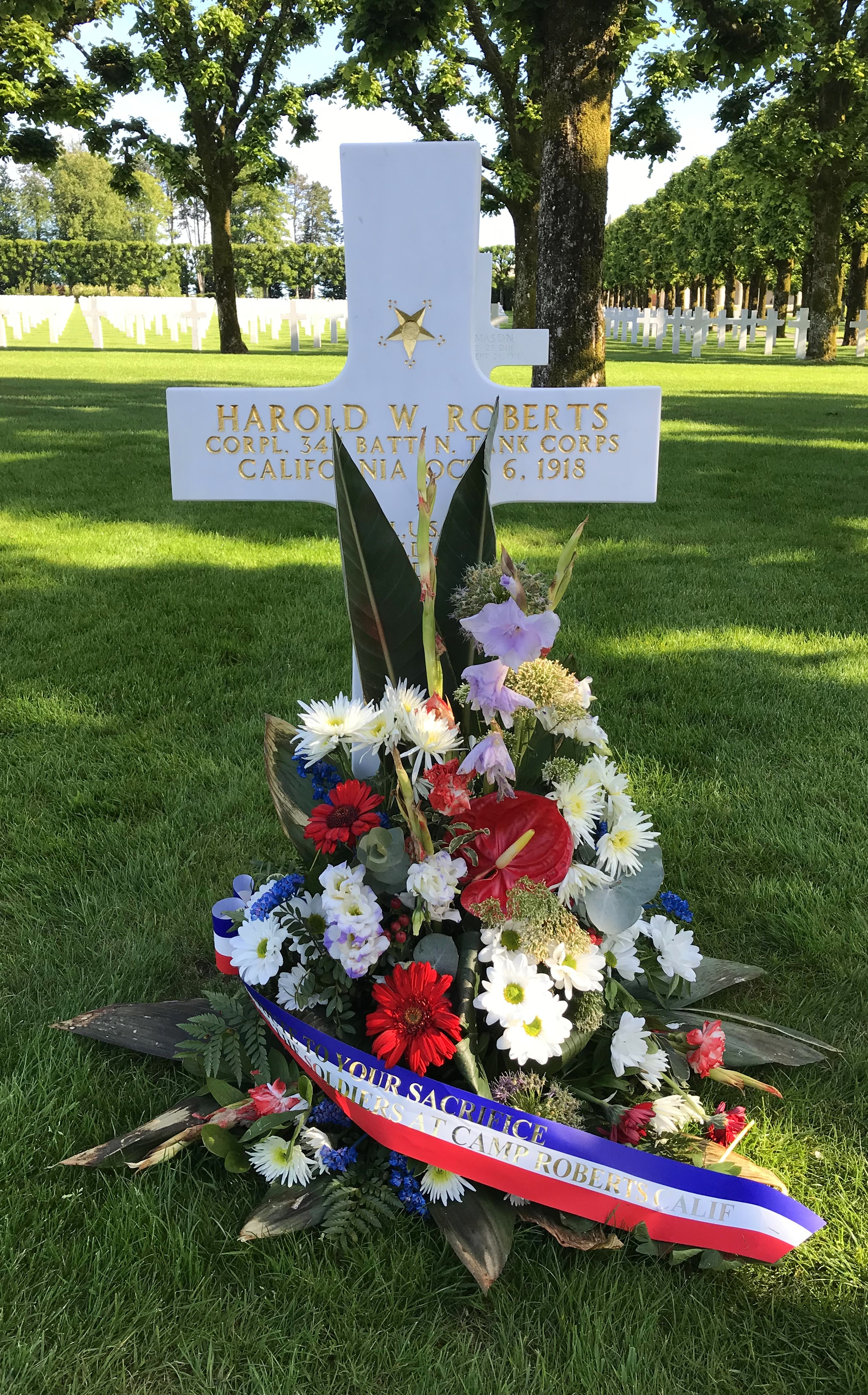
Grave of Medal of Honor recipient Harold W. Roberts

== See also ==
- List of World War I memorials and cemeteries in the Argonne
- Meuse-Argonne American Memorial
- Meuse-Argonne Offensive
