= Oscar F. Miller =

Oscar Franklin Miller
- Medal of Honor recipient
- Born: October 25, 1882; Franklin County, Arkansas, US
- Died: September 29, 1918 (aged 35) near Véry, France
- Burial place: Meuse-Argonne American Cemetery, Romagne-sous-Montfaucon, France
- Military career
- Allegiance: United States
- Branch: United States Army
- Service years: 1901–1904, 1917–1918
- Rank: Major
- Units: 28th Infantry Regiment; 361st Infantry Regiment, 91st Division
- Conflicts: Philippine–American War; World War I • Meuse-Argonne Offensive
- Awards: Medal of Honor

Oscar Franklin Miller (October 25, 1882 – September 29, 1918) was a United States Army officer and a recipient of the United States military's highest decoration, the Medal of Honor, for his actions in World War I.

== Early life ==
Miller was born in Franklin County, Arkansas, the third of eight children. His father, A.J. Miller, was originally from the eastern U.S. and had settled in Arkansas after the Civil War. At age eight, Miller's father died and the family moved to Bryant the next year. Miller's formal education ended after elementary school. In 1899, he moved to Texas in search of work and found a job with a newspaper publisher in the town of Paris. After a year, he briefly visited his home in Bryant and then returned to Texas, this time working as a waiter in Colorado City. While at this job, he learned to speak Spanish.

== Philippine–American War ==
Miller enlisted in the Army on April 9, 1901, for a three-year term of service. After training, he was sent to the Philippines to fight in the Philippine–American War as a private with Company A of the 28th Infantry Regiment. He served as a company clerk and put his Spanish-language skills to use as an interpreter. During his two years in the Philippines, he was wounded in action. He returned to the U.S. and served out the rest of his enlistment with the 28th Infantry's Company G.

== Civil service ==
After leaving the Army, he worked briefly in Berkeley, California, before acquiring a job as a railway mail clerk with the U.S. Postal Service in Little Rock, Arkansas. While in Little Rock, he met and married Anna Conrad, the daughter of the city's police chief. A year later, their only child, Oscar Franklin Miller, Jr., was born. Miller came into conflict with the U.S. Postal Service's bureaucracy following a dispute over a misplaced mail sack, in which he refused to follow the chain of command and insisted on corresponding directly with the St. Louis postal inspector. As a result, he was transferred out of Little Rock to the Memphis, Tennessee–McAlister, Indian Territory, route.

In 1907, Miller became an immigration inspector in Laredo, Texas, a job he would hold for the next ten years. During that time, he was transferred to a variety of cities, including Nogales, Arizona, Tucson, Arizona, Amarillo, Texas, and finally Los Angeles, California. In this capacity, Miller apprehended illegal immigrants, assembled cases against smugglers, and patrolled land and water routes across the U.S.–Mexico border and along the California coastline.

== World War I ==
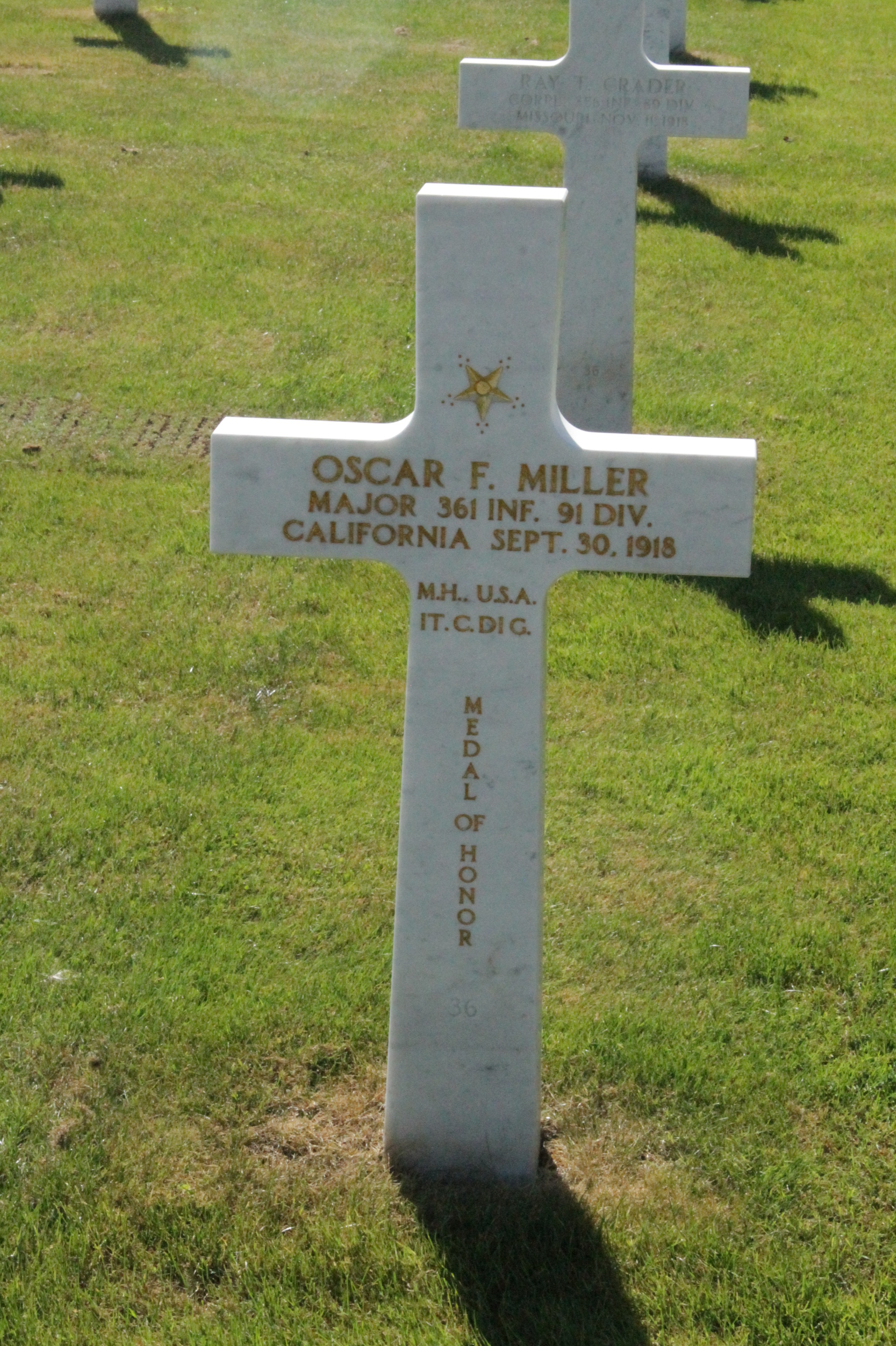
The grave of Oscar F. Miller, Meuse-Argonne American Cemetery, France

Resigning from his job with the immigration service, Miller re-enlisted in the U.S. Army on May 16, 1917, shortly after the United States' official entry into World War I. He attended a reserve officer training camp in Presidio, California, and performed well enough to be one of two people promoted to major upon graduation. For the next year, he served in Fort Lewis, Washington, during the organization and training of the 361st Infantry Regiment, 91st Division. He was then sent to New York City before the 361st Regiment was shipped out to Europe, arriving in July 1918. After receiving field officer training in England and France, Miller rejoined his unit.

On September 28, 1918, he led his battalion in an attack against a fortified position, continuing to lead and encourage his men even after being mortally wounded. For these actions, he was posthumously awarded the Medal of Honor.

Miller, aged 35 at his death, was buried at Meuse-Argonne American Cemetery outside of Romagne-sous-Montfaucon in France.

== Medal of Honor citation ==
After 2 days of intense physical and mental strain, during which Maj. Miller had led his battalion in the front line of the advance through the forest of Argonne, the enemy was met in a prepared position south of Gesnes. Though almost exhausted, he energetically reorganized his battalion and ordered an attack. Upon reaching open ground the advancing line began to waver in the face of machinegun fire from the front and flanks and direct artillery fire. Personally leading his command group forward between his front-line companies, Maj. Miller inspired his men by his personal courage, and they again pressed on toward the hostile position. As this officer led the renewed attack he was shot in the right leg, but he nevertheless staggered forward at the head of his command. Soon afterwards he was again shot in the right arm, but he continued the charge, personally cheering his troops on through the heavy machinegun fire. Just before the objective was reached he received a wound in the abdomen, which forced him to the ground, but he continued to urge his men on, telling them to push on to the next ridge and leave him where he lay. He died from his wounds a few days later.
