= Marcellus H. Chiles =

US Army Medal of Honor recipient (1895–1918)

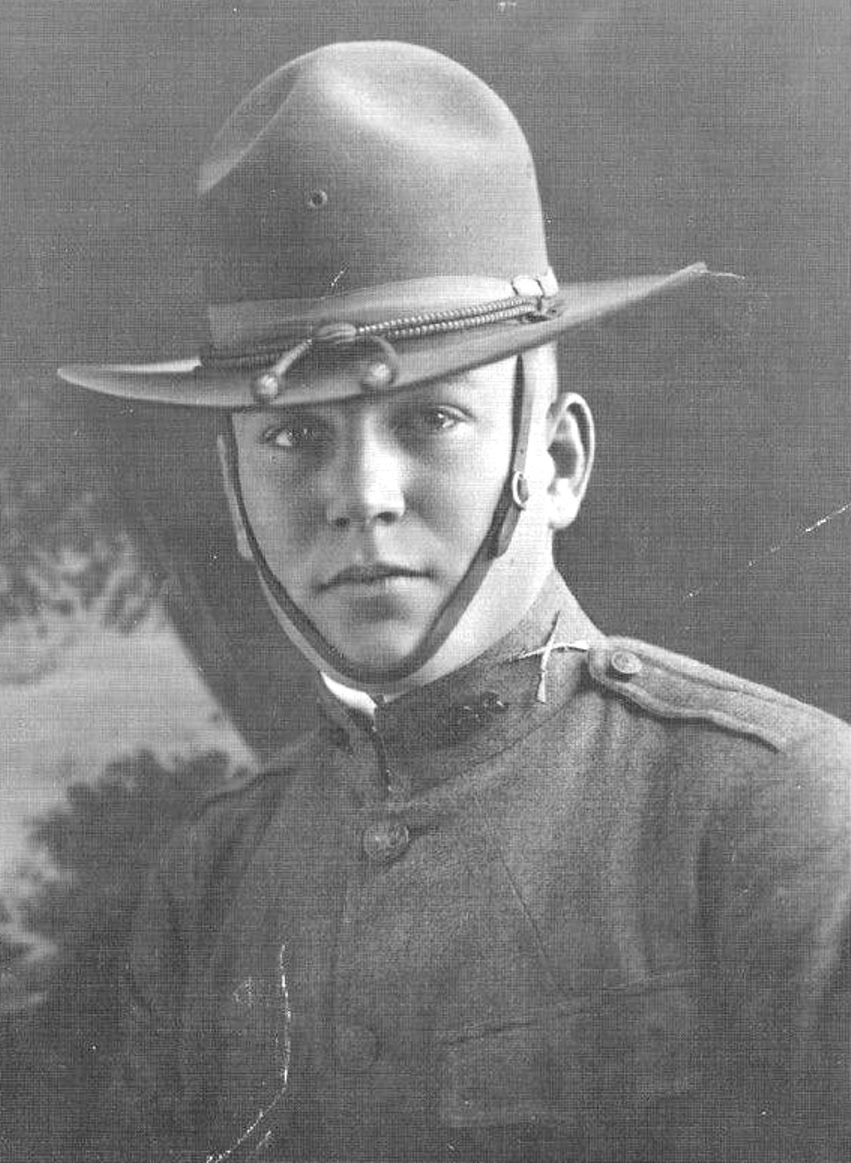
- Medal of Honor recipient
- Born: February 5, 1895; Eureka Springs, Arkansas
- Died: November 5, 1918 (aged 23); France
- Burial place: Meuse-Argonne American Cemetery, Romagne-sous-Montfaucon, France
- Military career
- Allegiance: United States
- Branch: United States Army
- Service years: 1917–1918
- Rank: Captain
- Unit: Infantry Branch
- Conflicts: World War I * Meuse-Argonne Offensive
- Awards: Medal of Honor

Captain Marcellus Holmes Chiles (February 5, 1895 – November 5, 1918) was a United States Army officer who received the Medal of Honor for his actions during World War I, he suffered wounds that ultimately caused his death during those actions.

== Biography ==
Chiles was born in Eureka Springs, Arkansas, to John Horne Chiles. He later moved to Denver, Colorado, where his father worked as a lawyer. He was a student at Colorado College when World War I began. After attending an officers' training camp, he was appointed a second lieutenant in the U.S. Army in August 1917.

Promoted to first lieutenant in January 1918, Chiles was sent to Europe with the 356th Infantry Regiment, 89th Division later that year. He first saw action at the Saint-Mihiel salient in northeast France in August 1918. On November 3, four days after being promoted to captain, Chiles participated in an advance near Le Champy Bas as part of the Meuse-Argonne Offensive. In command of a battalion, he oversaw an attack against a large German force, leading his men through a waist-deep stream despite intense machine gun fire. Wounded during the water crossing, Chiles continued to crawl after his troops after reaching the stream bank. After turning over command of the battalion, he was evacuated to a hospital, where he died on November 5. For these actions, he received the Distinguished Service Cross; the award was upgraded to the Medal of Honor the next year.

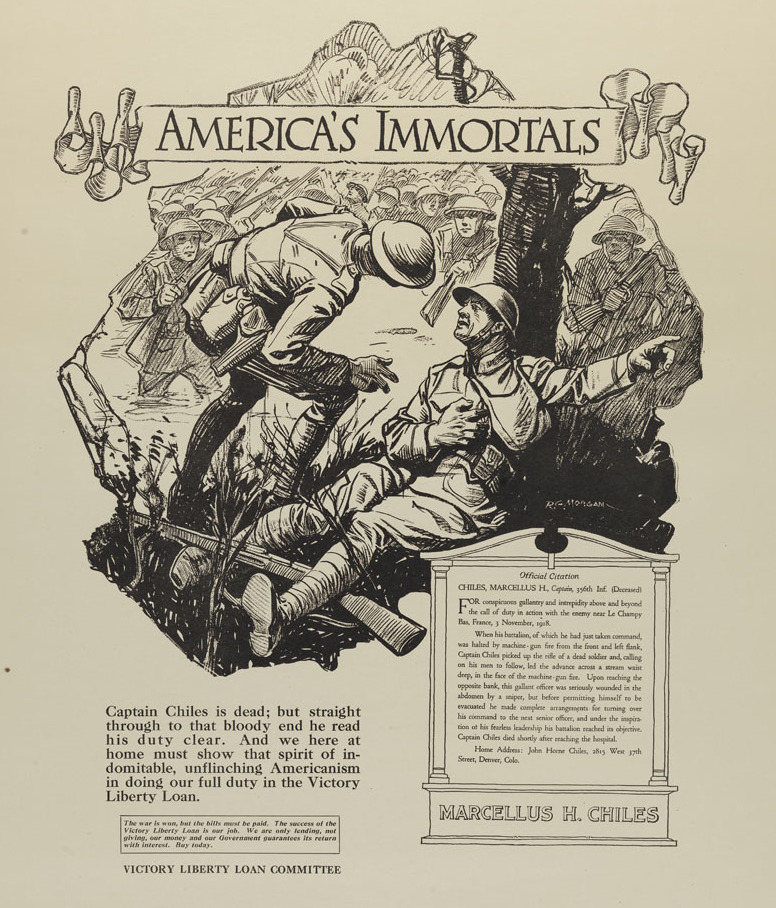
"America's Immortals, Marcellus H. Chiles" 1919 poster.

Chiles, aged 23 at his death, is buried at the Meuse-Argonne American Cemetery near Romagne-sous-Montfaucon, France.

== Medal of Honor citation ==
Rank and organization: Captain, U.S. Army, 356th Infantry, 89th Division. Place and date: Near Le Champy Bas, France, 3 November 1918. Entered service at: Denver, Colo. Birth: Eureka Springs, Ark. G.O. No.: 20, W.D., 1919.

Citation:

When his battalion, of which he had just taken command, was halted by machinegun fire from the front and left flank, he picked up the rifle of a dead soldier and, calling on his men to follow led the advance across a stream, waist deep, in the face of the machinegun fire. Upon reaching the opposite bank this gallant officer was seriously wounded in the abdomen by a sniper, but before permitting himself to be evacuated he made complete arrangements for turning over his command to the next senior officer, and under the inspiration of his fearless leadership his battalion reached its objective. Capt. Chiles died shortly after reaching the hospital.

== See also ==
- List of Medal of Honor recipients for World War I
