= 91st Training Division =

91st Infantry Division 91st Training Division (Operations)
- 91st Infantry Division insignia
- Active: 5 August 1917–13 May 1919 (National Army); 24 June 1921–1 December 1945 (Organized Reserve); 21 December 1946–1 May 1959 (Army Reserve); 1 May 1959–1 October 2009 (91st Training Div.); 1 October 2009–18 September 2010 (91st Training Bge.); 18 September 2010–present (91st Training Div.)
- Country: United States
- Branch: United States Army Reserve
- Type: Infantry; Training
- Size: Division
- Part of: 84th Training Command
- Garrison/HQ: Fort Hunter Liggett
- Mottos: Powder River, Let'er Buck!
- Engagements: World War I; Ypres-Lys; Meuse-Argonne; Lorraine 1918; World War II; Rome-Arno; North Apennines; Po Valley
- Website: 91st Training Division

Commanders
- Current commander: BG Shaun P. Miller
- Command Sergeant Major: CSM Sarah Dean

Insignia
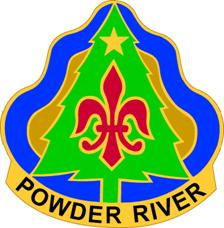
- Distinctive unit insignia

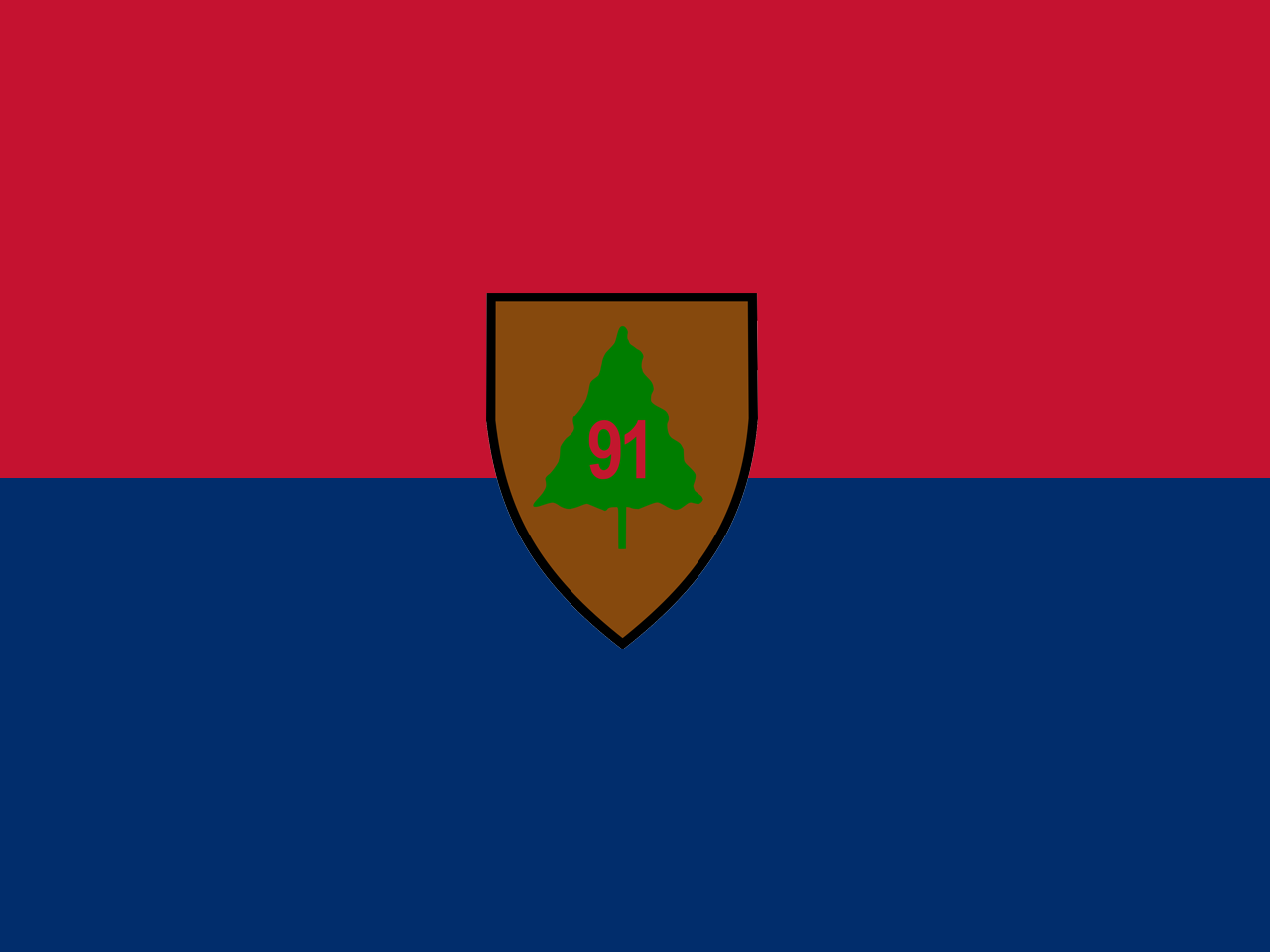
- Flag of the United States Army 91st Training Division

The 91st Training Division (Operations) is a military training formation of the United States Army. It was established in 2010. It draws its history and official lineage from the 91st Infantry Division, an infantry division that fought in World War I and World War II. From 1946 until 2008, the division in several different guises was part of the United States Army Reserve.

== History ==
=== World War I ===
The 91st Division was constituted by the War Department on 5 August 1917, and was to be organized at Camp Lewis, near Tacoma, Washington, with draftees from California, Idaho, Montana, Nevada, Oregon, Utah, Washington, and Wyoming. Nearly from the outset, the division was nicknamed the "Wild West Division," and in 1918, it adopted a fir tree as its shoulder sleeve insignia to symbolize its traditional home of the Western United States. On 26 August, Major General Henry Alexander Greene assumed command. During September, organization of the division was begun from a cadre of officers and men of the Regular Army and from Officers' Reserve Corps and National Army officers from the First Officers Training Camps. From 5-10 September, 2,300 draftees arrived at camp, with 18,000 following from 18-24 September. Systematic training was begun.

From 3-8 October, the last drafts of 1917 furnished Camp Lewis with 18,000 men, and on 31 October, the division approximated 26,000. During November, 8,000 men were transferred to the 41st Division; between January and June 1918, over 30,000 fresh drafts and transfers arrived at Camp Lewis, but 25,000 men departed. The division received new men, but by March, transfers reduced its strength to less than 20,000. During May and June the division was increased to a strength of 23,000.

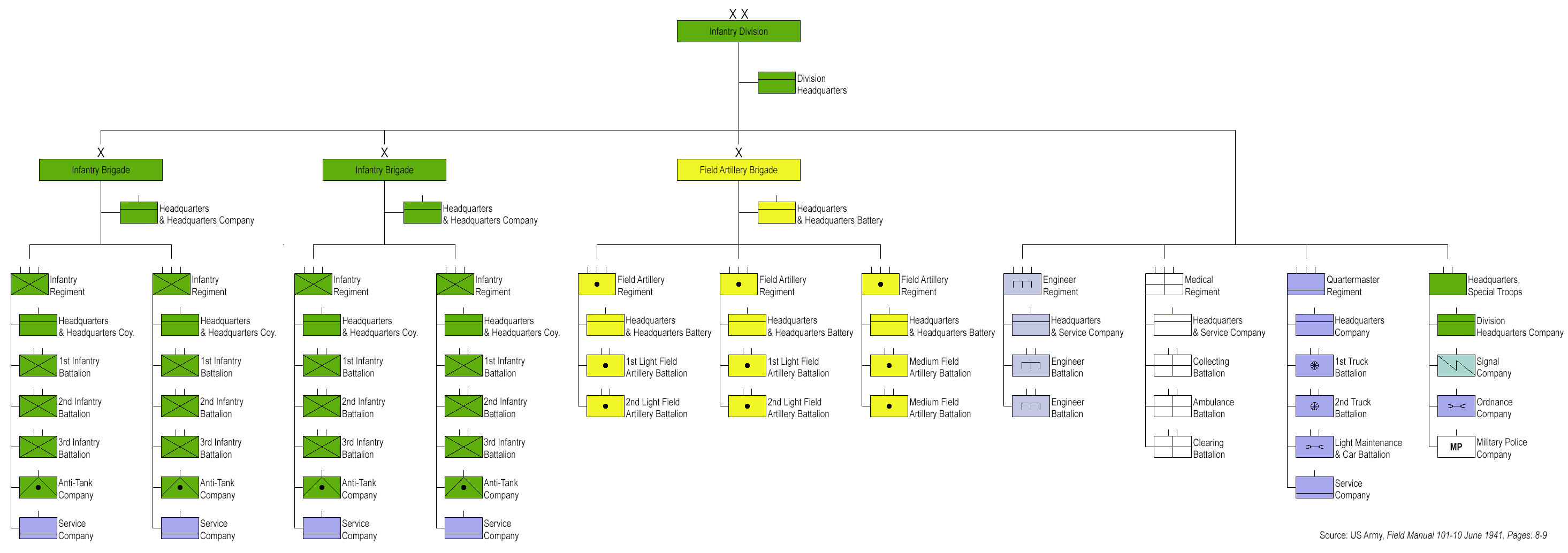
Square Division example: 1940 US Infantry Division. On the far left can be seen two Brigades of two Regiments each

In June and July, the division departed for England. In September 1918, the division's first operation was in the St. Mihiel Offensive in France. Serving under the U.S. Army's V Corps, the division, now commanded by Major General William Johnston Jr., fought in the Meuse-Argonne Offensive and successfully helped to destroy the German First Guard Division and continued to smash through three successive enemy lines. Twelve days before the end of World War I, the division, as part of the VII Corps of the French Sixth Army, helped drive the Germans east across the Escaut River in the Battle of the Lys and the Escaut. The division was awarded separate campaign streamers for its active role in the Lorraine, Meuse-Argonne and Ypres-Lys campaigns.

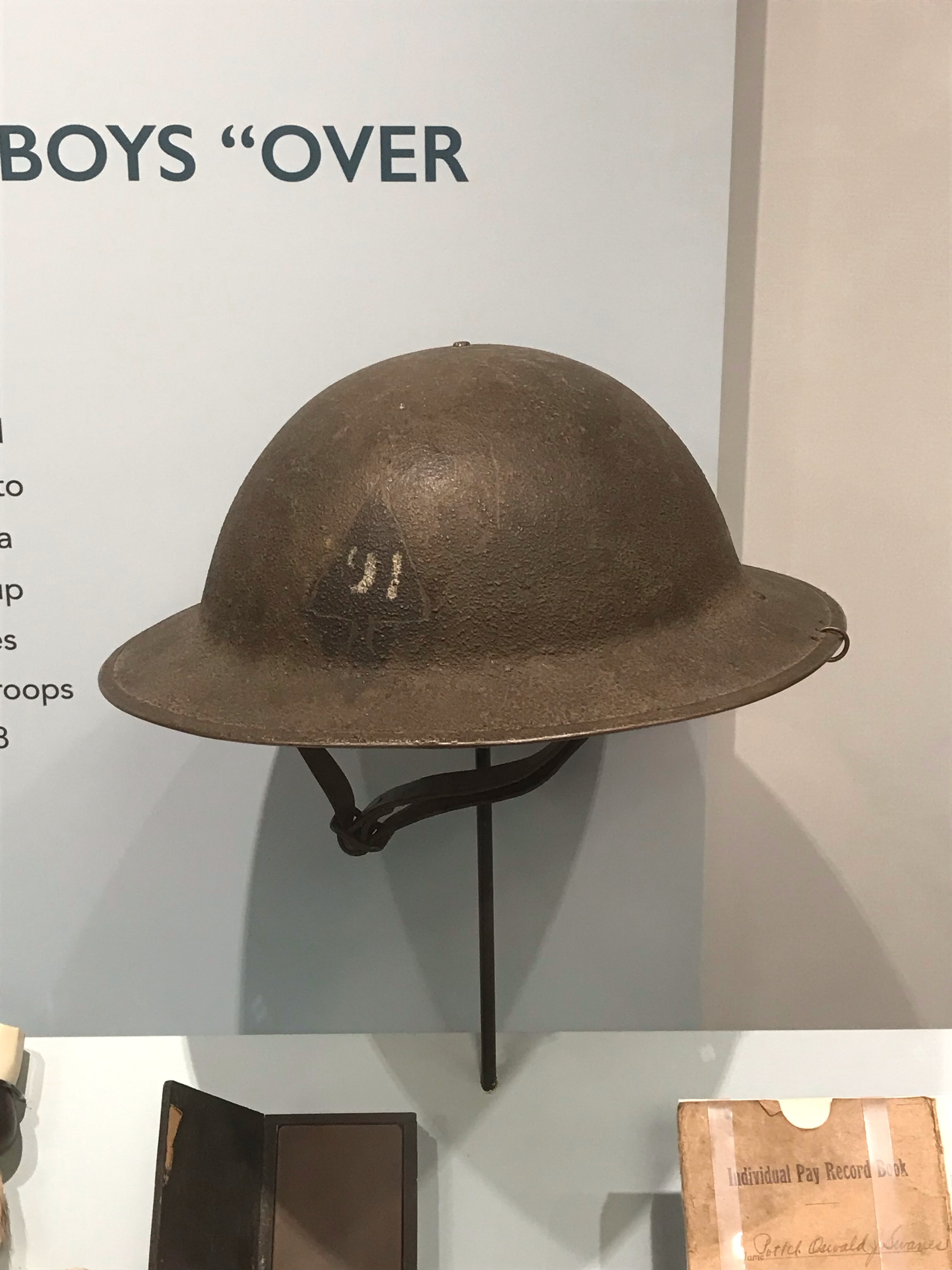
M1917 helmet worn by a Doughboy of the 91st Division in France in 1918

The division was composed of the following units:

==== Order of battle ====
- Headquarters, 91st Division
- 181st Infantry Brigade
  - 361st Infantry Regiment
  - 362nd Infantry Regiment
  - 347th Machine Gun Battalion
- 182nd Infantry Brigade
  - 363rd Infantry Regiment
  - 364th Infantry Regiment
  - 348th Machine Gun Battalion
- 166th Field Artillery Brigade
  - 346th Field Artillery Regiment (75 mm)
  - 347th Field Artillery Regiment (4.7")
  - 348th Field Artillery Regiment (155 mm)
  - 316th Trench Mortar Battery
- 346th Machine Gun Battalion
- 316th Engineer Regiment
- 316th Medical Regiment
- 316th Field Signal Battalion
- Headquarters Troop, 91st Division
- 316th Train Headquarters and Military Police
  - 316th Ammunition Train
  - 316th Supply Train
  - 316th Engineer Train
  - 316th Sanitary Train
    - 361st, 362nd, 363rd, and 364th Ambulance Companies and Field Hospitals

=== Interwar period ===
The 91st Division headquarters arrived at the port of Brooklyn, New York, aboard the USS Calamares on 16 April 1919 after 11 months of overseas service and was demobilized on 13 May 1919 at the Presidio of San Francisco, California. The 91st Division was reconstituted in the Organized Reserve on 24 June 1921, allotted to the Ninth Corps Area, and assigned to the XIX Corps. The division was further allotted the state of California as its home area. The division headquarters was organized in November 1921 in Building 88 at the Presidio of San Francisco. The headquarters was later moved to Building 172 at the Presidio and remained there until activated for World War II. To maintain communications with the officers of the division, the division staff published a newsletter titled “The 91st Division Bulletin.” The newsletter informed the division’s members of such things as when and where the inactive training sessions were to be held, what the division’s summer training quotas were, where the camps were to be held, and which units would be assigned to help conduct the Citizens Military Training Camps (CMTC).

The designated mobilization and training station for the division was Del Monte, California, the location where much of the 91st Division’s training activities occurred in the interwar years. The subordinate infantry regiments of the division held their summer training with the 3rd Division's 30th Infantry Regiment at Del Monte. Other units, such as the special troops, artillery, engineers, aviation, medical, and quartermaster, trained at various posts in the Ninth Corps Area, often with the active units of the 3rd Division. For example, the division’s artillery trained at the Presidio of Monterey with the 2nd Battalion, 76th Field Artillery; the 316th Engineer Regiment trained at Fort Lewis with the 6th Engineers; the 316th Medical Regiment trained at the Medical Corps training camp at the Presidio of San Francisco; and the 316th Observation Squadron trained with the 91st Observation Squadron at Crissy Field, California. In addition to the unit training camps, the infantry regiments of the division rotated responsibility to conduct the CMTC training held at Del Monte and the Presidio each year as well.

On a number of occasions, the division participated in Ninth Corps Area and Fourth Army command post exercises (CPXs) in conjunction with other Regular Army, National Guard, and Organized Reserve units. These training events gave division staff officers’ opportunities to practice the roles they would be expected to perform in the event the division was mobilized. Unlike the Regular and Guard units in the Ninth Corps Area, the 91st Division did not participate in the various Ninth Corps Area maneuvers and the Fourth Army maneuvers of 1937, 1940, and 1941 as an organized unit due to lack of enlisted personnel and equipment. Instead, the officers and a few enlisted reservists were assigned to Regular and Guard units to fill vacant slots and bring the units up to war strength for the exercises. Additionally, some officers were assigned duties as umpires or as support personnel.

=== World War II ===
==== Mobilization ====
As the early battles of World War II involving the United States were being fought, the division was reactivated at Camp White, Oregon, on 15 August 1942, under the command of Major General Charles H. Gerhardt, around a cadre coming for the most part from the 1st Cavalry Division. Remaining enlisted personnel to complete the division arrived in October and November 1942 from all parts of the United States. After initial training at Camp White, the division participation in one of the major Oregon Maneuver combat exercises in the fall of 1943.

Before Organized Reserve infantry divisions were ordered into active military service, they were reorganized on paper as "triangular" divisions under the 1940 tables of organization. The headquarters companies of the two infantry brigades were consolidated into the division's cavalry reconnaissance troop, and one infantry regiment was removed by inactivation. The field artillery brigade headquarters and headquarters battery became the headquarters and headquarters battery of the division artillery. Its three field artillery regiments were reorganized into four battalions; one battalion was taken from each of the two 75 mm gun regiments to form two 105 mm howitzer battalions, the brigade's ammunition train was reorganized as the third 105 mm howitzer battalion, and the 155 mm howitzer battalion was formed from the 155 mm howitzer regiment. The engineer, medical, and quartermaster regiments were reorganized into battalions. In 1942, divisional quartermaster battalions were split into ordnance light maintenance companies and quartermaster companies, and the division's headquarters and military police company, which had previously been a combined unit, was split.

==== Division organization ====
The division consisted of the following units:

91st Infantry Division organization (click to enlarge)

- 91st Infantry Division
  - 91st Infantry Division Headquarters
  - 91st Cavalry Reconnaissance Troop (Mechanized) (M3 scout cars and then M8 Greyhound armored cars)
  - 361st Infantry Regiment
    - Headquarters and Headquarters Company
    - 3× Infantry battalions
      - each battalion consists of: 1× Headquarters and Headquarters Company, 3× Rifle companies, 1× Heavy Weapons Company
    - Cannon Company (T12 Gun Motor Carriages and T19 Howitzer Motor Carriages, later replaced by either M3 105mm towed howitzers or M7 Priest self propelled howitzers)
    - Anti-Tank Company (M3 37mm anti-tank guns, which were replaced by 1944 with M1 57mm anti-tank guns)
    - Service Company
  - 362nd Infantry Regiment
    - same organization as 361st Infantry Regiment
  - 363rd Infantry Regiment
    - same organization as 361st Infantry Regiment
  - 91st Infantry Division Artillery
    - Headquarters and Headquarters Battery
    - 346th Field Artillery Battalion
      - Headquarters and Headquarters Battery
      - 3× Batteries (M2 105mm towed howitzers)
      - Service Battery
    - 347th Field Artillery Battalion
      - same organization as 346th Field Artillery Battalion
    - 348th Field Artillery Battalion
      - Headquarters and Headquarters Battery
      - 3× Batteries (M1 155mm towed howitzers)
      - Service Battery
    - 916th Field Artillery Battalion
      - same organization as 346th Field Artillery Battalion
  - Headquarters Special Troops
    - Headquarters Company, 91st Infantry Division
    - 91st Signal Company
    - 91st Quartermaster Company
    - 791st Ordnance Light Maintenance Company
    - Military Police Platoon
    - 91st Infantry Division Band (attached)
  - 316th Engineer Combat Battalion
    - Headquarters and Headquarters and Service Company
    - 3× Engineer combat companies
  - 316th Medical Battalion
    - Headquarters and Headquarters Detachment
    - 3× Collecting companies
    - Clearing Company

==== Combat chronicle ====
Major General William G. Livesay being the commander, the division departed for the European Continent on 3 April 1944. There, on the Italian Front, the 361st Regimental Combat Team was detached to participate in the battles for Rome and the Arno River. It became the first formation of the U.S. Fifth Army to reach the river. In September 1944, the division crossed the Sieve River, outflanked the famous Gothic Line, and captured the Futa Pass. Beginning from the middle of April 1945, the division, along with its II Corps sister units, pushed forward against the units of German XIV Panzer Corps as part of Operation Grapeshot.

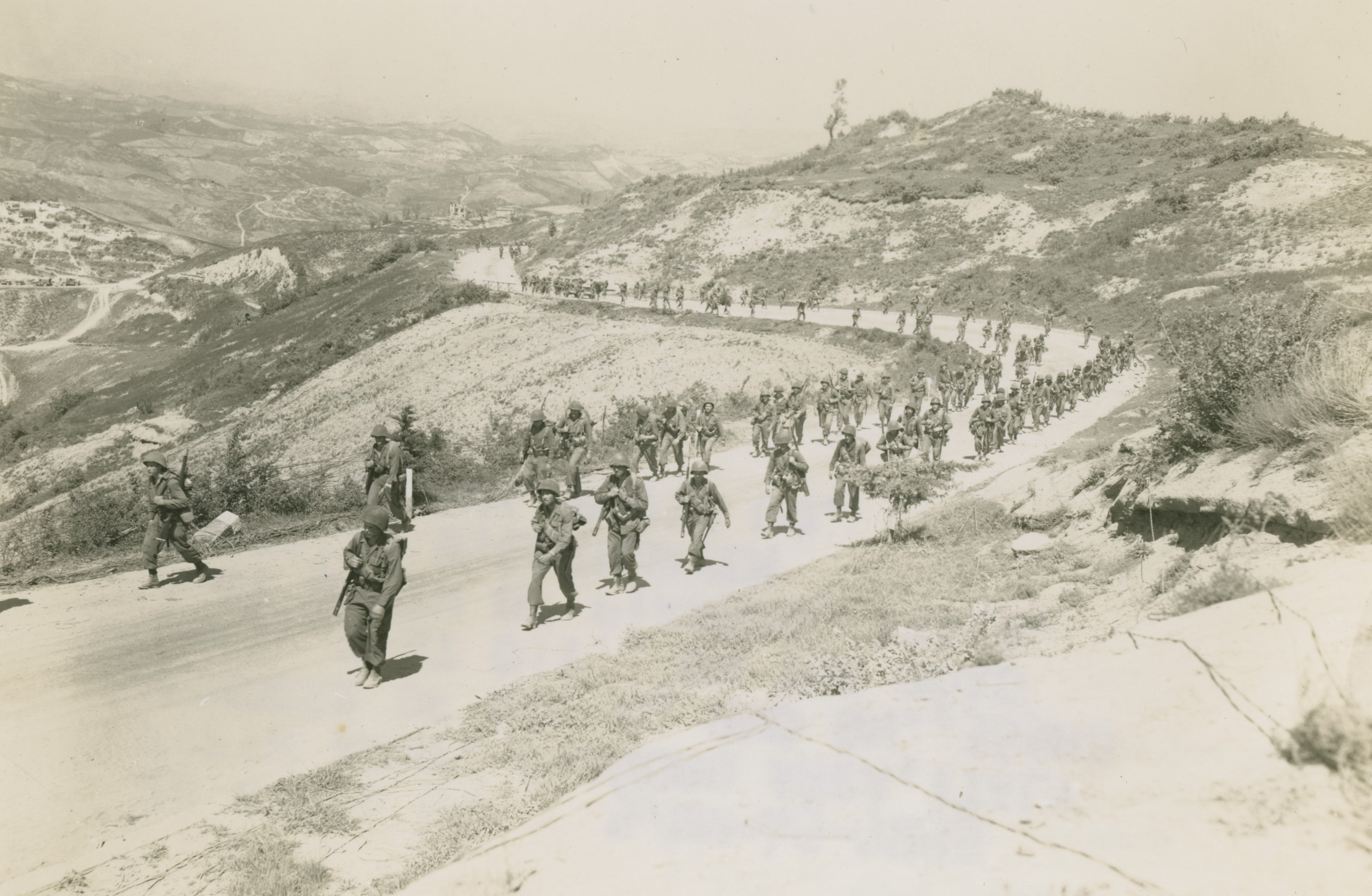
Men of Company C, 363rd Infantry Regiment, 91st Infantry Division, on the road just south of Pianoro, Italy, April 1945.

The division returned to the United States where it was inactivated at Camp Rucker, Alabama, in December 1945.

==== Casualties ====
- Total battle casualties: 8,744
- Killed in action: 1,400
- Wounded in action: 6,748
- Missing in action: 262
- Prisoner of war: 334

==== Campaigns ====
- Rome-Arno (22 Jan 44 – 9 Sep 44)
- North Apennines (10 Sep 44 – 4 April 45)
- Po Valley (5 Apr 45 – 8 May 45)

Days of combat: 271

==== Individual awards ====
- 2 Medals of Honor
  - Sergeant Roy Woodroe Harmon (Posthumously)
  - Sergeant (then Private first class) Oscar Godfrey Johnson, Jr.
- 29 Distinguished Service Crosses
  - S/Sgt Francis G. Ambrose (Posth.)
  - 1st Lt John W. Anderson (Posth.)
  - 1st Lt Leroy A. Bastron
  - T/5 Franklin E. Carlson (Posth.)
  - Capt Edward J. Conley
  - Pfc John Czinki (Posth.)
  - Pfc Ralph F. Darragh (Posth.)
  - S/Sgt Harry W. Douglass
  - T/Sgt Roy H. Dullum
  - Sgt Carroll D. Eggers (Posth.)
  - Capt William B. Fulton
  - Pfc Thomas P. Gibson
  - Pfc Jack E. Green
  - S/Sgt Alexander M. Greig (Posth.)
  - Pfc Harry E. Hamilton
  - S/Sgt Robert J. Hutson
  - T/Sgt Elmer W. Kaich
  - S/Sgt Johnny D. Lake
  - Pfc Rosario V. Lerma
  - T/Sgt Clyde W. Lloyd
  - 2nd Lt (then 1st Sgt) Russell M. McKelvey
  - T/5 William A. Montooth
  - Pvt Teddie B. Rexall
  - Maj Bertram N. Sheff
  - Pfc Bruce K. Turner
  - Pfc Joseph O. Van Osdol (Posth.)
  - Pvt Howard E. Weaver
  - S/Sgt Welton C. Westfall
  - 1st Lt George G. Wilson (Posth.)
- 1 Distinguished Service Medal
- 528 Silver Stars
- 33 Legions of Merit
- 43 Soldier's Medals
- 4,152 Bronze Stars

==== Notable personnel ====
- Commanding generals: Major General Charles H. Gerhardt (May 1942 – 22 July 1943); Major General William G. Livesay (July 1943 - November/December 1945); BG Neal C. Johnson (November/December 1945)
- Assistant Commanding generals: BG Percy W. Clarkson (- September 1942); BG Charles L. Bolte (September 1942 – February 1943); BG William E. Crist (April 1943 – December 1943); BG Raymond E. S. Williamson (14 January 1944 – 18 October 1945)
- Commanding Officers Artillery: BG Edward S. Ott (1942–1943); BG Ralph Hospital (1943–1945)

=== Recent history ===
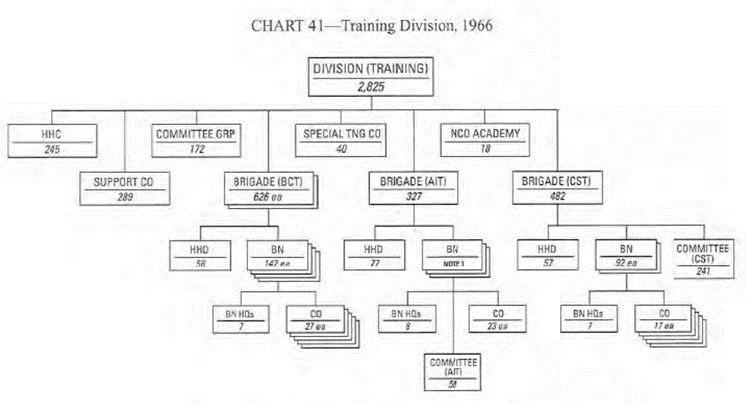
Standard organization chart for a training division

In December 1946, the 91st was reactivated at the Presidio of San Francisco as part of the U.S. Army Reserve. In 1959, the division was reorganized and redesignated as the 91st Division (Training). In 1993, the division was again reorganized and redesignated as the 91st Division (Exercise) and again in 1999 as the 91st Division (Training Support).

Its headquarters was at Parks Reserve Forces Training Area (PRFTA), Dublin, California, when the 2005 Base Realignment and Closure Commission recommended the Department of Defense relocate the 91st Division to Fort Hunter Liggett.

The four brigades of the 91st Division were redesignated as separate brigades:

- 1st Brigade (PRFTA) is now 5th Brigade, 75th Division.
- 2nd Brigade (Fort Carson) is now 5th Armored Brigade.
- 3rd Brigade (Travis AFB) is now the 402nd Field Artillery Brigade.
- 4th Brigade (Fort Lewis) is now 191st Infantry Brigade.

The 91st Division moved its headquarters to Fort Hunter Liggett on 1 May 2009, was reorganized and re-designated as the 91st Training Brigade (Operations) on 1 October 2009 and was then re-designated as the 91st Training Division (Operations) on 1 October 2010.

== Units in 2026 ==
The division is a subordinate unit of the 84th Training Command. As of January 2026 it consists of the following units:

- 91st Training Division, at Fort Hunter Liggett (CA)
  - Headquarters and Headquarters Company, at Fort Hunter Liggett (CA)
  - Mission Training Complex (MTC), at Camp Parks (CA)
  - 1st Brigade, in Phoenix (AZ)
    - 1st Mission Command Training Detachment (MCTD), in Garden Grove (CA)
    - 2nd Mission Command Training Detachment (MCTD), at Fort Hood (TX)
    - 4th Battalion, 361st Regiment (Observe/Controller Trainer — OC/T), in Phoenix (AZ)
    - 3rd Battalion, 381st Regiment (Observe/Controller Trainer — OC/T), in Grand Prairie (TX)
  - 2nd Brigade, in Denver (CO)
    - 1st Mission Command Training Detachment (MCTD), at Fort Bliss (TX)
      - 1st Branch, 1st MCTD, in Denver (CO)
    - 2nd Mission Command Training Detachment (MCTD), in Happy Valley (OR)
      - 1st Branch, 2nd MCTD, at Camp Parks (CA)
    - 11th Battalion, 104th Regiment (Observe/Controller Trainer — OC/T), in Boise (ID)
      - Alpha Company, 11th Battalion, 104th Infantry Regiment (Observe/Controller Trainer — OC/T), at Fort Harrison (MT)
    - 2nd Battalion, 378th Regiment (Observe/Controller Trainer — OC/T), at Fort Douglas (UT)
      - Alpha Company, 2nd Battalion, 378th Infantry Regiment (Observe/Controller Trainer — OC/T), in Denver (CO)

== Notable members ==
- William Borders, Army Catholic Chaplain, was awarded the Bronze Star Medal with "V" device, while serving with the 362 Infantry Regiment in bitter fighting in Italy. He later became the Archbishop of Baltimore.
- Frederick Lippitt, politician and philanthropist.
- Oscar Franklin Miller, Medal of Honor recipient.
- Deming Bronson, Medal of Honor recipient.
- Harold Hitz Burton, Associate Justice of the Supreme Court of the United States
- Earl Warren, Chief Justice of the United States

== In the Media ==
The soldiers in the TV show Combat! portray members of the 363rd (is 361st in S2Ep25&26 & others) Infantry Regiment.

== Division insignia ==
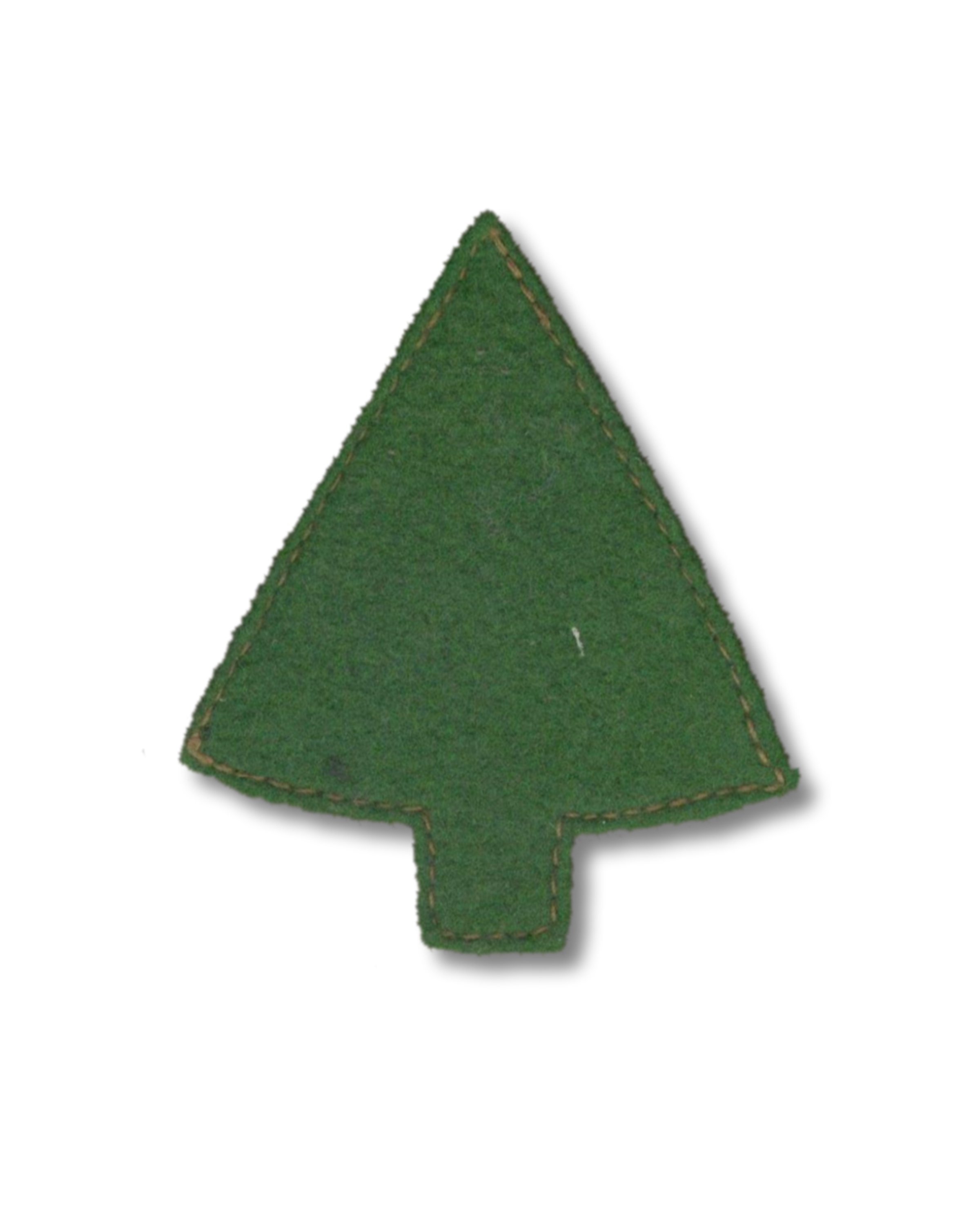
SSI for the 91st Infantry Division in World War 1

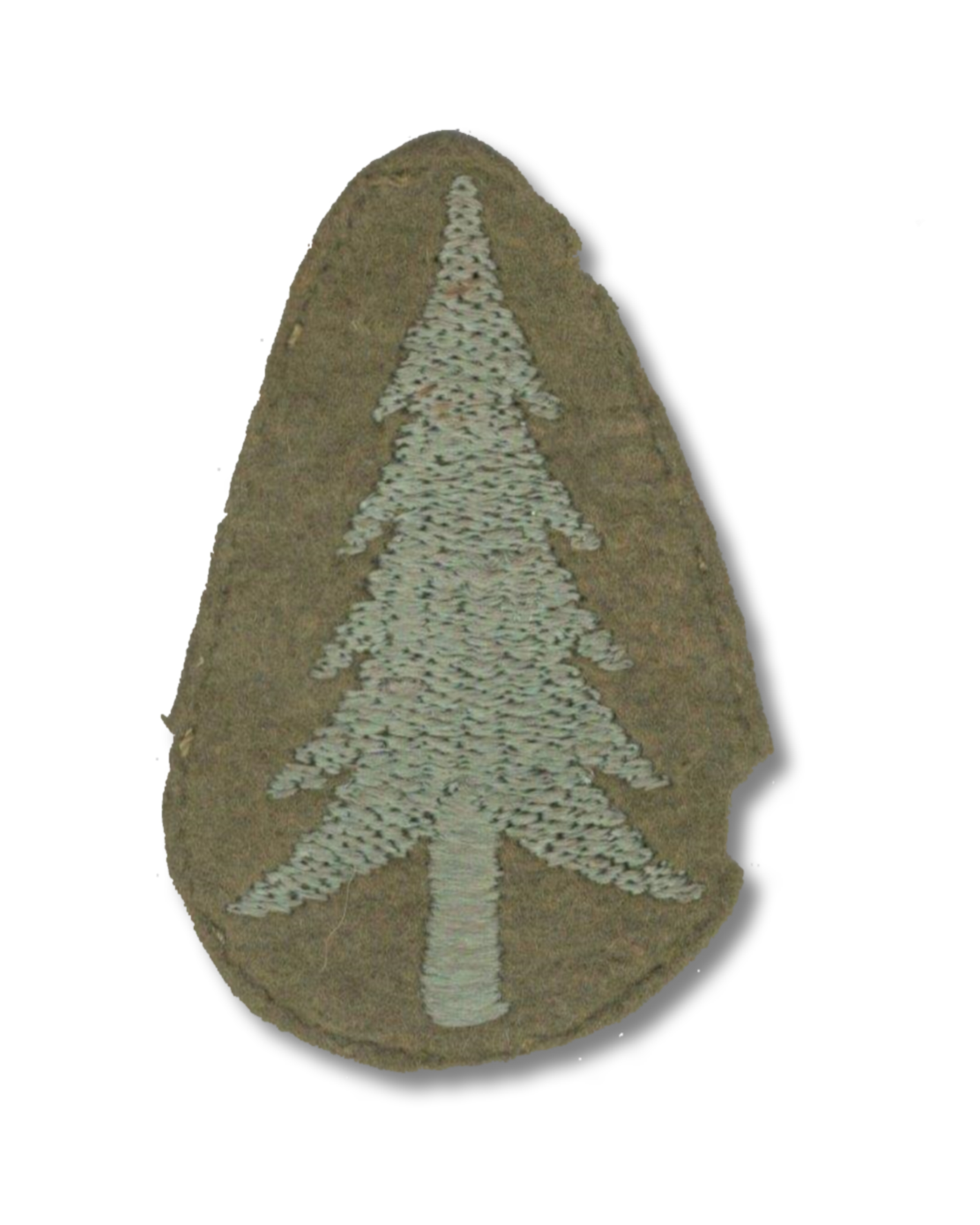
Variation SSI for the 91st Infantry Division in World War 1

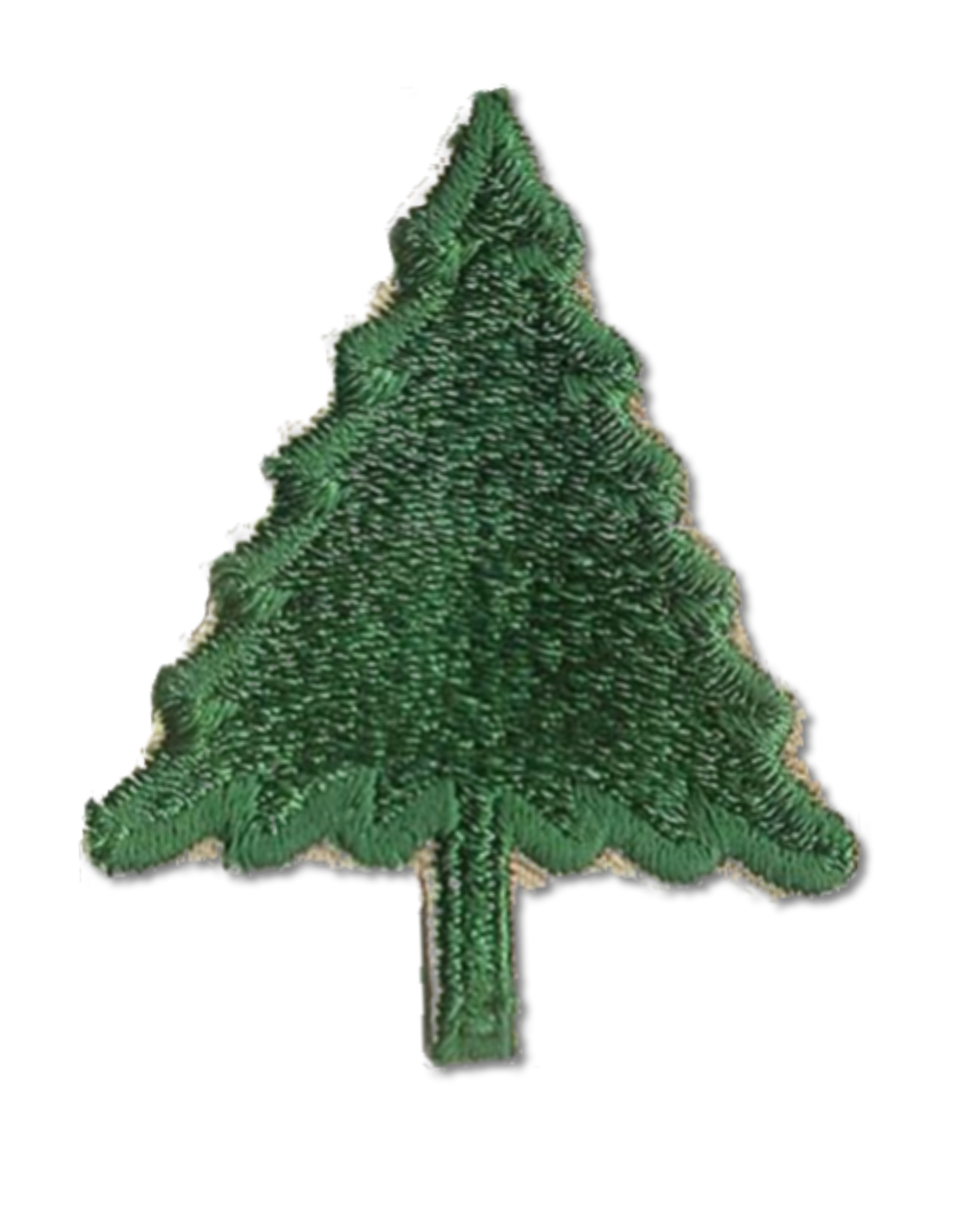
SSI for the 91st Infantry Division in World War 2
