= Harold W. Roberts =

United States Army Medal of Honor recipient

Harold William Roberts
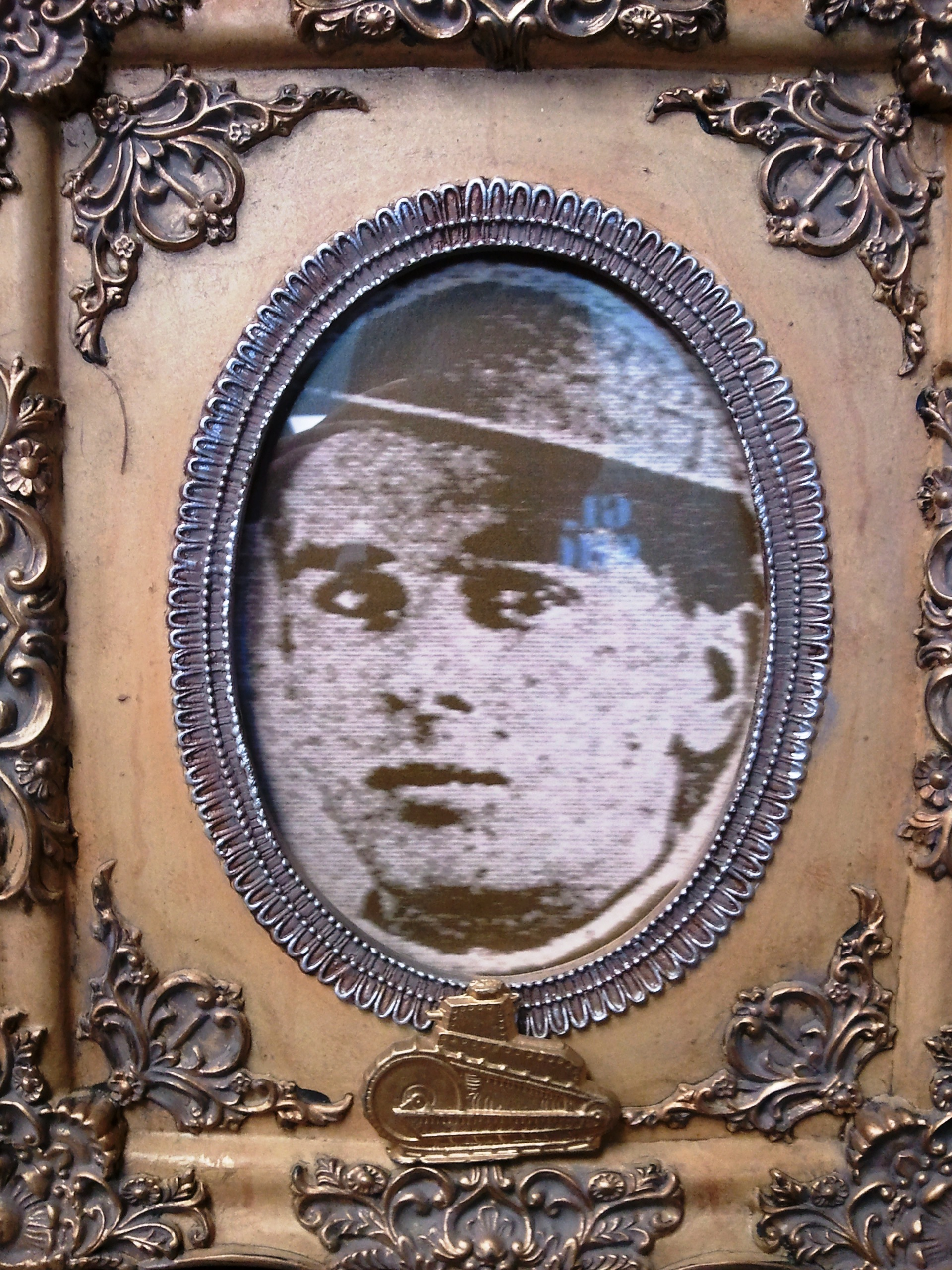
- Born: October 14, 1895; San Francisco, California, US
- Died: October 6, 1918 (aged 22); Montrebeau Woods, France
- Burial place: Meuse-Argonne American Cemetery and Memorial, Romagne, France
- Military career
- Allegiance: United States
- Branch: United States Army
- Service years: 1916–1918
- Rank: Corporal
- Units: Company A, 344th Battalion, Light Tank Corps
- Conflicts: World War I
- Awards: Medal of Honor

Harold William Roberts (October 14, 1895 – October 6, 1918) was a United States Army corporal and a recipient of the United States military's highest decoration, the Medal of Honor, for his actions in World War I. Roberts, a tank driver, was moving his tank into a clump of bushes to afford protection to another tank which had become disabled. The tank slid into a shell hole, 10 feet deep, filled with water, and was immediately submerged. Knowing that only one of the two men in the tank could escape, Cpl. Roberts said to the gunner, "Well, only one of us can get out, and out you go," whereupon he pushed his companion through the back door of the tank and drowned.

== Early life ==
Harold William Roberts was born in the Noe Valley area of San Francisco, California. Roberts' father was John Albert Roberts. Roberts' mother was Elfreda Josephine "Freda" Roberts. His father was a harness-maker and his mother was a housewife. While still a boy, his family survived the great San Francisco earthquake of 1906, but his mother died two years later of a gastric ulcer. Being now an only child of a single working class father, he was sent to live with his German immigrant grandmother, Christina Seifert, in a Victorian house that still stands at the corner of 25th and Diamond Streets in San Francisco.

Roberts attended the nearby James Lick Grammar School in San Francisco. Shortly after graduating, on June 5, 1910, The San Francisco Chronicle published an essay by him about the value of having a fun summer vacation as part of growing up healthy and well-rounded. Another essay by him was published a month later in the Junior Section of the July 17th issue of The Call.

I think all the people in the city of San Francisco are interested in the tunnel project. I think that when the people build the Twin Peaks Tunnel it will open up the vast area on the other side of it. It would also be a shortcut; for coming from the south. Tunnels should also be built through all the hills in the downtown district, as it would save labor, and time going over them. I think that they should tunnel under Market Street Tunnel also, as people and teams would have more right of way. The tunnel should be used for the cars only that run on Market Street. The people and teams could keep to the street.

He attended Lick-Wilmerding High School in San Francisco, where he was the captain of the baseball team. After graduation, he worked construction and took a short trip through Mexico. He then enrolled at the University of California at Berkeley.

== Career ==
In December 1916, Roberts was sworn into the U.S. Army at Fort McDowell on Angel Island in San Francisco Bay. He was assigned Army Serial number 1013943. After completing the very basic military training provided at that period to new recruits, he was assigned to the U.S. Cavalry. He was then sent to the Philippine Islands. There he was assigned to HQ Troop 15th Cavalry at Fort William McKinley Fort Bonifacio (commanded by Brigadier General Hunter Liggett).

Upon return from his tour of duty in the Philippines, Roberts and his regiment reported to Camp Fremont, near Palo Alto, California. However, in a month or so he was sent with the 15th Cavalry to Camp Harry J. Jones at Douglas, New Mexico. There, their regiment joined the 1st and 17th Cavalry Regiments, becoming part of the newly formed 15th Cavalry Division that was headquartered in El Paso, Texas. Soon thereafter the 15th Cavalry was selected to deploy to Europe to join the battle raging there.

By February 1918, Roberts and his fellow cavalrymen were squeezed aboard a crowded troop train that transported them to Camp Merritt, New Jersey, near Hoboken, New Jersey. On March 14 the men marched to board ferryboats at Old Closter Dock, Alpine Landing. The ferries took them to the piers at Hoboken to board the transport ship USS Aeolus, which was headed to France. The ship was a former German ocean liner seized by the United States.

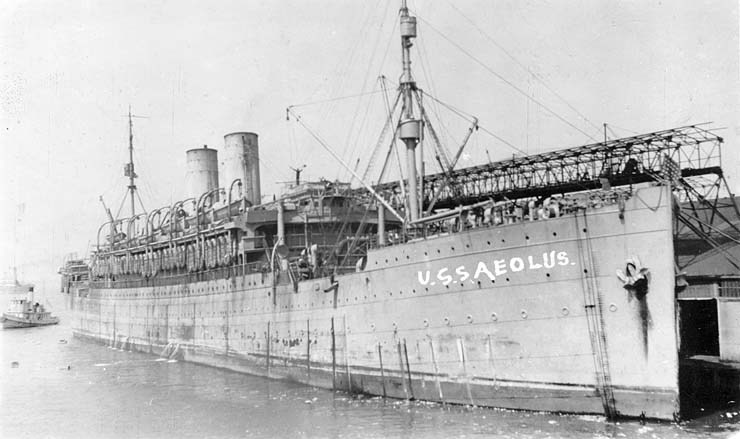
USS Aeolus

The trip across the Atlantic Ocean aboard the Aeolus took two weeks, punctuated by seasickness from the rough seas and rumors of U-boat sightings. Arriving in France, Roberts' regiment was under the leadership of the commander of the American Expeditionary Force (AEF), General John J. Pershing. General Pershing had assigned Lieutenant-Colonel George S. Patton to recruit soldiers from other Army branches into his new Tank Corps. A call went out for enlisted men of good character and physique with some knowledge of mechanics and topography. Since mounted cavalry was not needed in this type of modern warfare, the 15th and two other Cavalry regiments were "dismounted". Cavalrymen not required for reconnaissance or other duties headed into other corps. Roberts decided on the Tank Corps and was soon transferred, assigned to Company A of the 326th Light Tank Battalion at the 311th Tank Center. The new tank center had been set up in Bourg, five miles from Langres, on the road to Dijon. Patton had established the A.E.F. Light Tank School there, and Roberts was enrolled as a student. There he learned all he could about these deadly little war juggernauts, immersing himself in every aspect of operating and maintaining one.

Roberts new battalion, the 326th, was assigned to the 304th Brigade, initially commanded by Patton. Two weeks prior to their initial entry into battle against the German forces, Roberts' battalion was issued 45 of the brigade's total of 144 French Renault FT17 tanks—the Automiltraillause a chenilles Renault FT modele 1917. One of the most revolutionary and influential tank designs in history, the popular FT17 weighed just over seven tons, and with 39 horsepower it had a top speed of 7 miles per hour. It was equipped with either the Puteaux SA 18, a single shot, breech-loading cannon capable of about ten rounds per minute or the 7.92 mm Hotchkiss heavy machine gun, capable of a rate of fire of 450 rounds per minute.

For the next few months, Roberts trained in tank driving, maintenance and operation, map and compass reading, range estimation, the logistics of trench crossing, obstacle avoidance and mass tank maneuvers. He was assigned as driver to an experienced gunner, Sergeant Virgil Morgan. The gunner learned to communicate his desired direction of travel inside the incredibly noisy and unlit tank interior by a series of toe taps to the back, shoulders and head of the driver. Roberts quickly mastered all the required skills. He became so proficient that he was soon assigned as driver for the platoon leader's tank.

At the end of the summer, Roberts' 326th Battalion was re-designated the 344th, though implementation of that change was slow in official circles. Then on September 12, the American Expeditionary Forces, including Roberts' battalion, joined a major offensive known as the Battle of Saint-Mihiel. Roberts entered combat with these late instructions from his commander, Patton, fresh in his memory:

No tank is to be surrendered or abandoned to the enemy. If you are left alone in the midst of the enemy keep shooting. If your gun is disabled use your pistols and squash the enemy with your tracks ... If your motor is stalled and your gun broken, still the infantry cannot hurt you. You hang on ... help will come. In any case remember you are the first American tanks. You must establish the fact that American tanks do not surrender!

It was the first operation, and supplied the first victory, for Pershing's independent American Army. However, five days of rain before the battle took a huge toll on the small tanks. Although their design incorporated a "trench crossing tail"—a steel arch to assist operation over especially rough terrain—they still had difficulty navigating over the wide, deep, and often water-filled trenches that the Germans had created to slow the Allied advance. Despite the deep mud and water-filled trenches that bogged down so many tanks, Roberts followed Patton's order resolutely and acquitted himself well in the four-day-long battle. So much so, in fact, he was promoted to corporal and allowed to be assigned back as driver for his good friend, Sergeant Morgan.

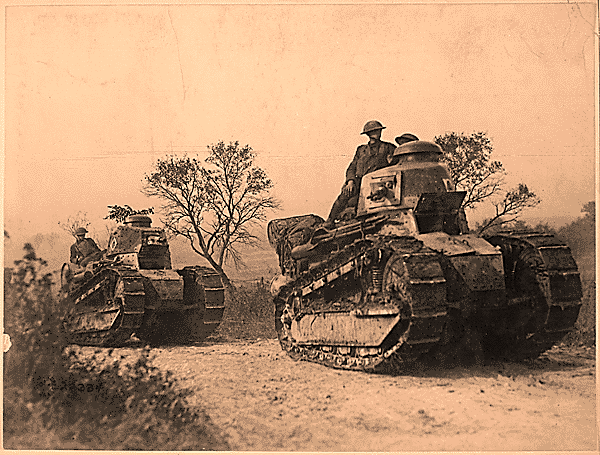
Corporal Roberts FT-17 918

Their tank, one of the now just 89 still operational after the first phase of the offensive, was soon transferred from the Saint-Mihiel area to a new jumping-off point north and northwest of the town of Verdun. The area into which they were to advance next had been occupied by the Germans for years. It had an elaborate defensive system of four fortified lines incorporating a dense network of barbed wire entanglements, trenches, machine gun positions, and concrete bunkers. The trenches had been made more effective with water traps, and the recent rains had made the ground over which they were to proceed a muddy mess.

On the morning of October 4, the second phase of the A.E.F.'s inaugural independent action, known as the Meuse-Argonne Offensive, began. The tanks, including Roberts', led the charge. Avoiding the shattered tree trunks, swampy low areas, and the tangles of barbed wire, they advanced. They faced shells from the numerous batteries of artillery high up in the Argonne Forest, bullets from the numerous hidden machine gun nests nearby, and mortar shells from more distant positions.

They had proceeded about a mile when they saw a disabled tank with a soldier crouched down beside it. When Roberts stopped their tank, the soldier crawled over to them. They opened the hatch and the soldier yelled that the tank on the left was struck, and he wanted protection from a German machine gun, pointing towards the trench woods.

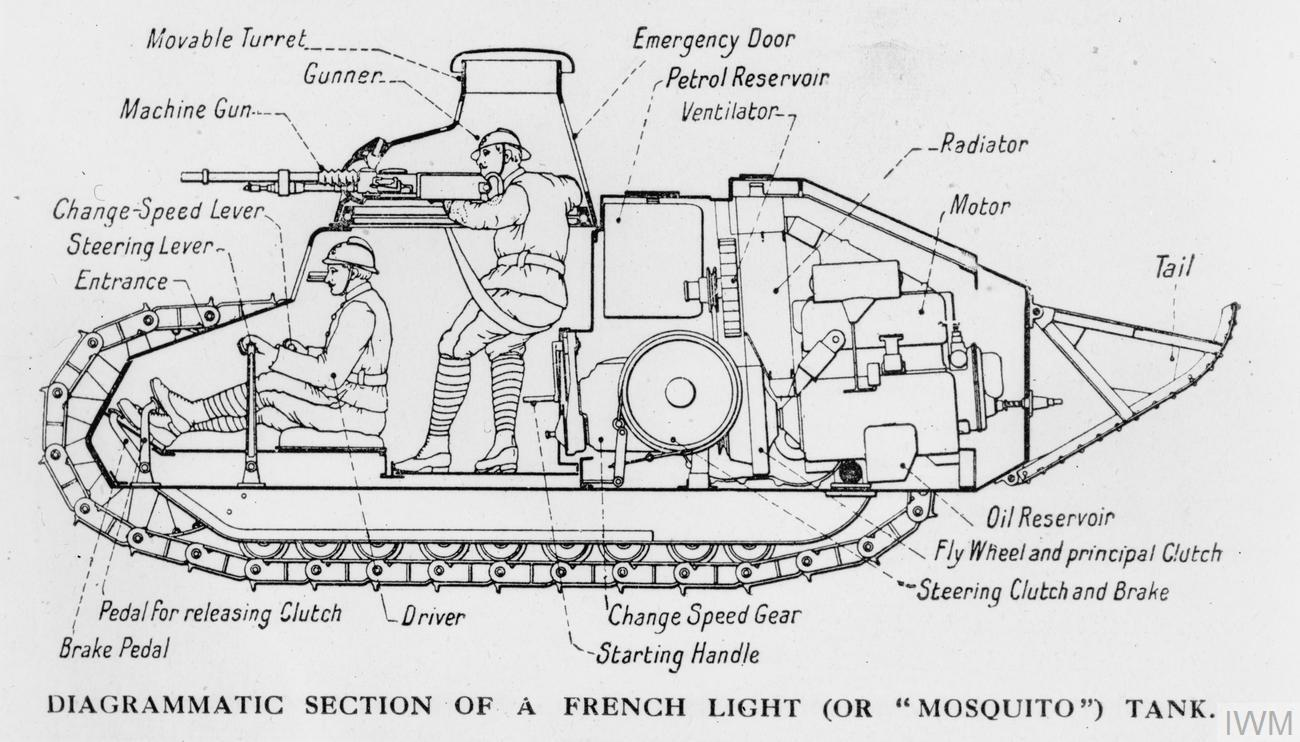
Renault FT-17 tank internal layout

Off we darted amid bursting shells and the sound of machine gun bullets lighting on our tank. Thinking the enemy was in the bushes ahead, Bob speeded up and we plowed right into it." But, instead of an enemy machine gun nest there was a large, ten foot deep, water-filled crater. They plunged into it.

In an interview with Morgan printed in the "San Francisco Chronicle" on November 1, 1919, Morgan related:

The crater we went into was caused by a large caliber shell, and therefore was so deep it was impossible to get out. By keeping the engine running in the reverse was the only way to keep the rear of the tank above water. As it took the continuous care of one man to keep the thing going, only one of us could get out. Roberts was in charge of the tank and when he saw it was impossible for both of us to get out, he said, 'Only one of us can get out and out you go.'

Morgan also wrote a letter to Roberts' father, which stated in part,

In a moment we were turned over and water was rushing into the tank. The back door was the only way to get out as the other doors were buried in mud. Bob's last words were, 'Only one of us can get out—and out you go,' and he gave me a push. I had to be the first out because there are gunner's doors and the driver's doors. Bob's doors were buried. When I came to the top of the water I waited and yelled for Bob. I was helpless as a baby, because the tank was completely covered with water and I couldn't get back in after him. I cried like a baby and waited, but he didn't come. ... And it was because of Bob's push that I am now alive to write this letter.

Two days later on October 6, 1918, Roberts' body was recovered, and he was officially declared dead. It was just a week short of his 23rd birthday.

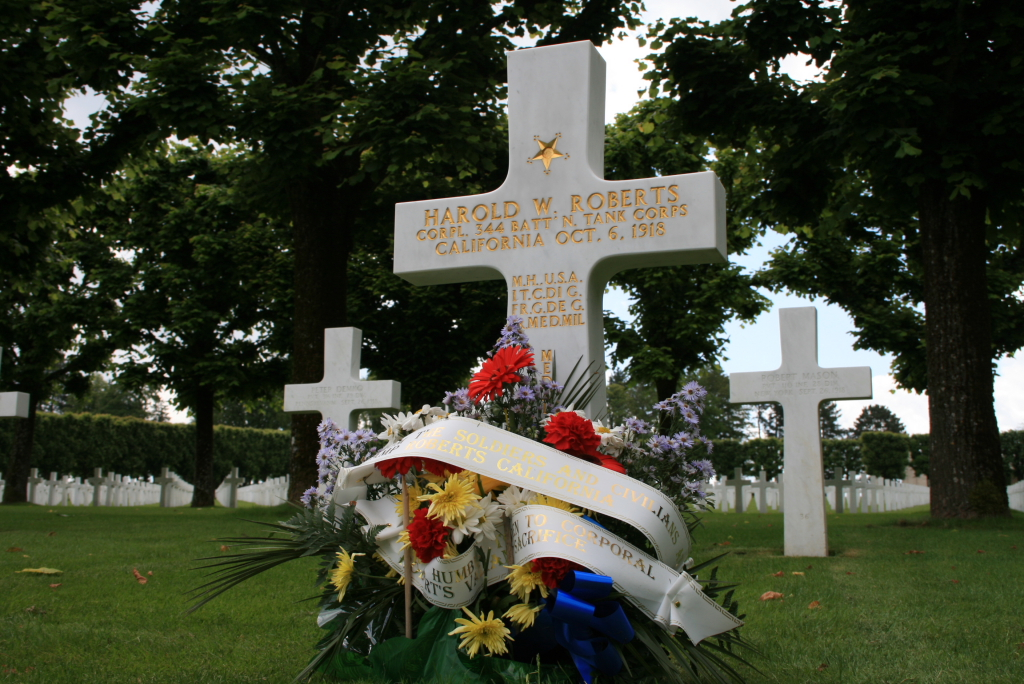
Roberts' grave marker in Meuse-Argonne American Cemetery

He was buried in a temporary grave near where he perished until the Meuse-Argonne American Cemetery was constructed at Romagne-sous-Montfaucon. He was then reinterred in that cemetery in Plot B, Row 45, Site 36. The cemetery, north of Verdun, is America's largest overseas cemetery and is maintained by the American Battle Monuments Commission.

Not long after his death, Corporal Roberts was selected, along with other Medal of Honor recipients, to be used in a series of patriotic posters produced for the Liberty Loan Committee to promote the sale of Victory Liberty Loan Bonds.

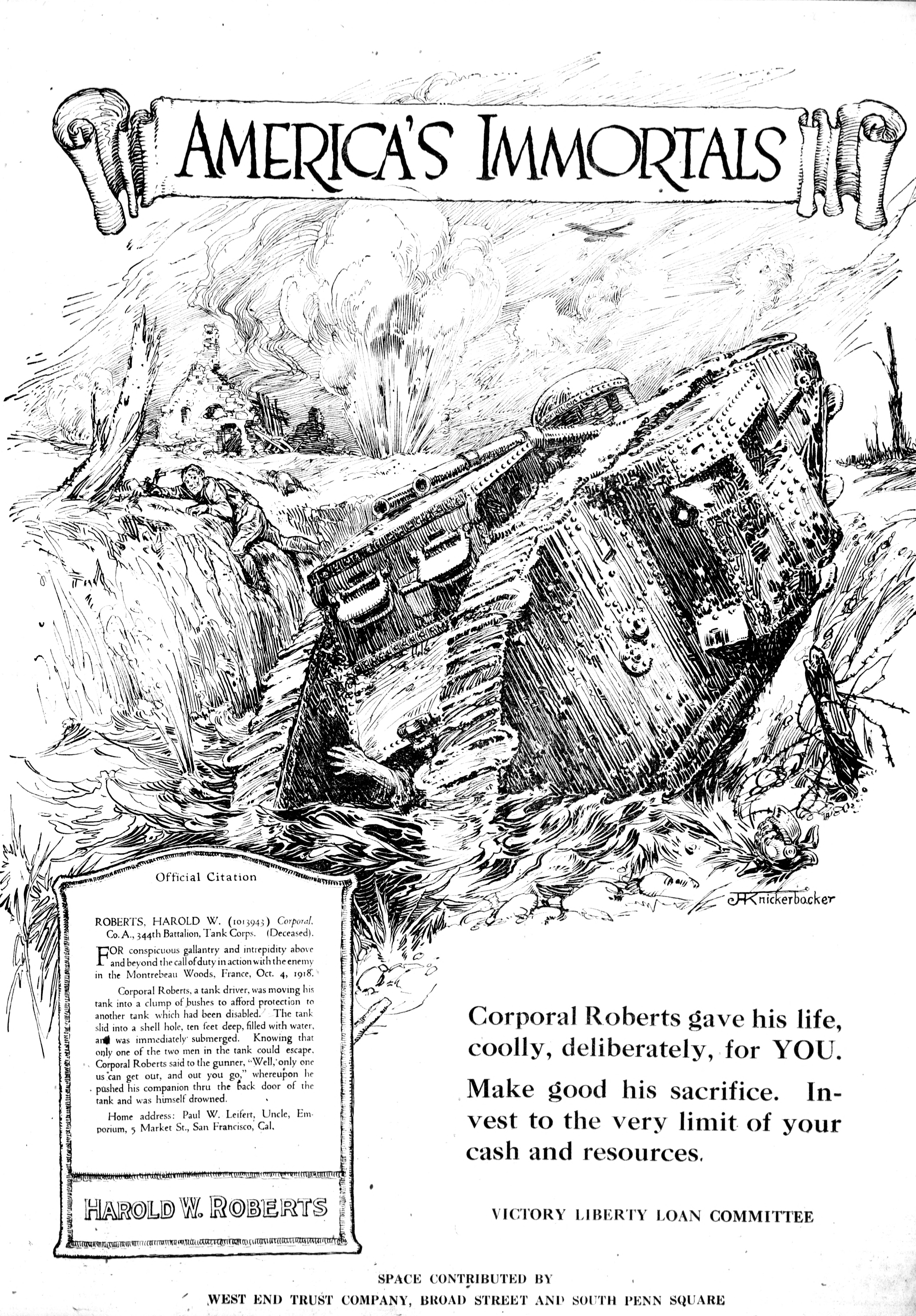
America's Immortal Harold W Roberts Evening Public Ledger April 24, 1919

Artist and well-known newspaper illustrator J. H. Knickerbocker was chosen to create Roberts' poster. While he depicted the wrong type of tank in his drawing and deviated somewhat from the description of the event as recounted by Morgan, he portrayed Roberts' final moments. The poster was placed in numerous newspapers across the country, greatly raising the public's awareness of his heroism and sacrifice, as well as helping to oversubscribe the $4.5 billion of bonds offered for sale.

Camp Nacimiento/Camp Bradley was renamed Camp Roberts by the War Department on January 1, 1941. During World War II, it was the largest Army basic training installation in the United States, daily training up to 47,000 trainees in its Infantry and Field Artillery Replacement Training Centers. It is also the home to the California National Guard. There is a bronze plaque with Roberts' image on it at the main entrance to the camp.

On October 31, 1926, a tree was planted at the Livermore Veterans Hospital in honor of Corporal Roberts.

Harold W. Roberts' name is engraved on the three-sided boulder, known as the Gold Star Mothers Rock, in Golden Gate Park, San Francisco. His name appears along with the names of 747 other local men and 13 women who died in World War I. The 18-ton boulder, located in "Heroes Grove" was reportedly quarried from the Twin Peaks area of San Francisco.

Roberts Avenue, located on Fort George G. Meade, a United States Army installation in Maryland, was named in honor of Corporal Roberts.

The Camp Roberts Historical Museum, located on Camp Roberts, California, has a large exhibit on Corporal Roberts in the style of a turn-of-the-20th Century parlor. The “Roberts/Seifert Parlor” represents the parlor in the home of his maternal grandmother, Christina Seifert, where he spent his teen years. It has a large portrait of Roberts on the wall, many period furnishings, and a motion-activated monitor that shows an audio-visual presentation of his life and times.

The current whereabouts of Corporal Roberts' Medal of Honor and other medals is a mystery. An article appeared in The Chillicothe [Ohio] Constitution-Tribune on April 26, 1945. The banner read, "Car Dealer Finds Congressional Medal of Honor In Old Car." The article read:

Blytheville, Ark. April. Harold W. Roberts, who served with Company A, 224th Tank Corps in World War I, does not know it, but his Congressional Medal of Honor has been found. The highest emblem presented by the Government for extraordinary service was found in a used car purchased Monday by a Blytheville dealer, and an effort is being made through the War Department to locate its owner. Car dealer C. C. Egan, after finding the medal, contacted a Blytheville A. A. F. soldier from whom he had bought the automobile. The soldier explained that he had found the medal while stationed in California but had misplaced it.

A follow-up article stated that the medal was being sent to the War Department for return to the next-of-kin. Since Roberts was an only child, had no issue, and his parents were also deceased by that time, the only next-of-kin might be a second or third cousin. But genealogy searches have come up empty. Likewise, enquiries to the National Archives and Library of Congress have turned up nothing.

Samples of Roberts' medals are on display in his exhibit at the Camp Roberts Historical Museum, but the originals remain missing. It is against federal law for anyone to have a Medal of Honor in their possession unless they are the awardee or a family member of a deceased awardee.

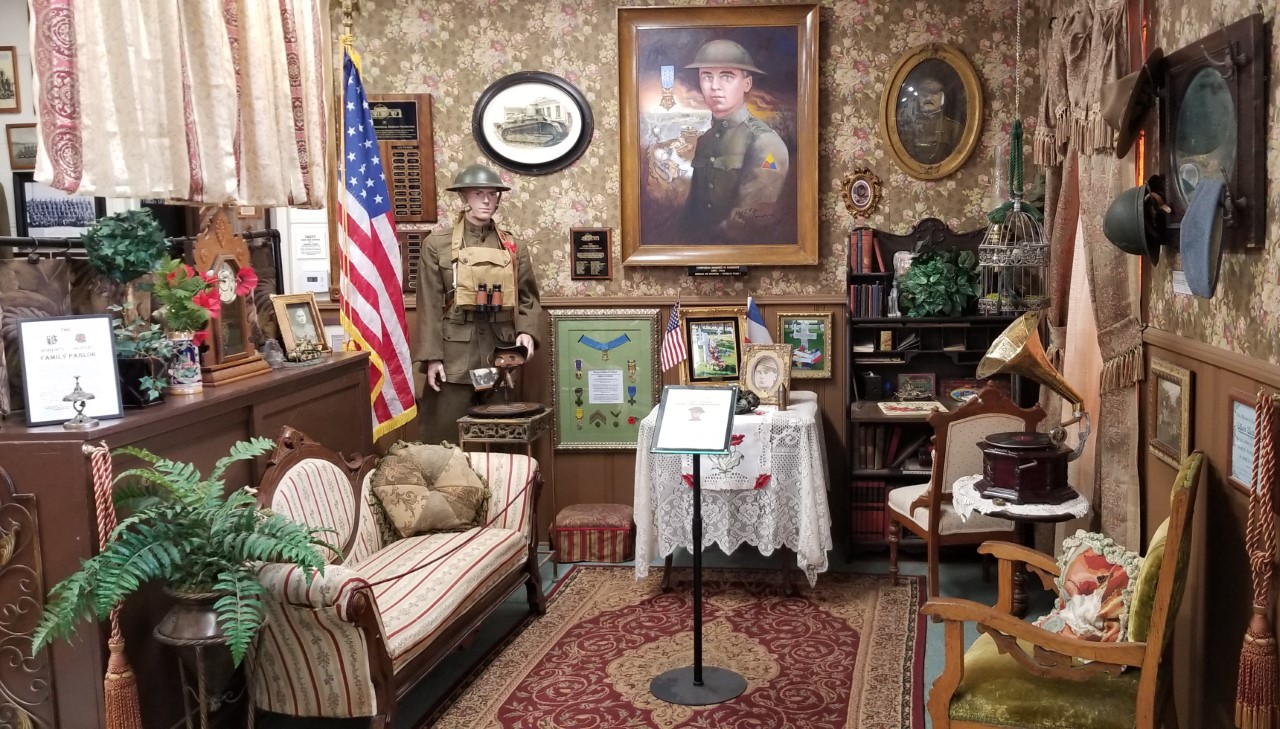
Camp Roberts Historical Museum Corporal Roberts' Exhibit

== See also ==
- List of Medal of Honor recipients
- List of Medal of Honor recipients for World War I
