= Meuse-Argonne American Memorial =

World War I monument

Meuse-Argonne American Memorial Montfaucon American Monument
- Monument Américain de Montfaucon
- American Battle Monuments Commission
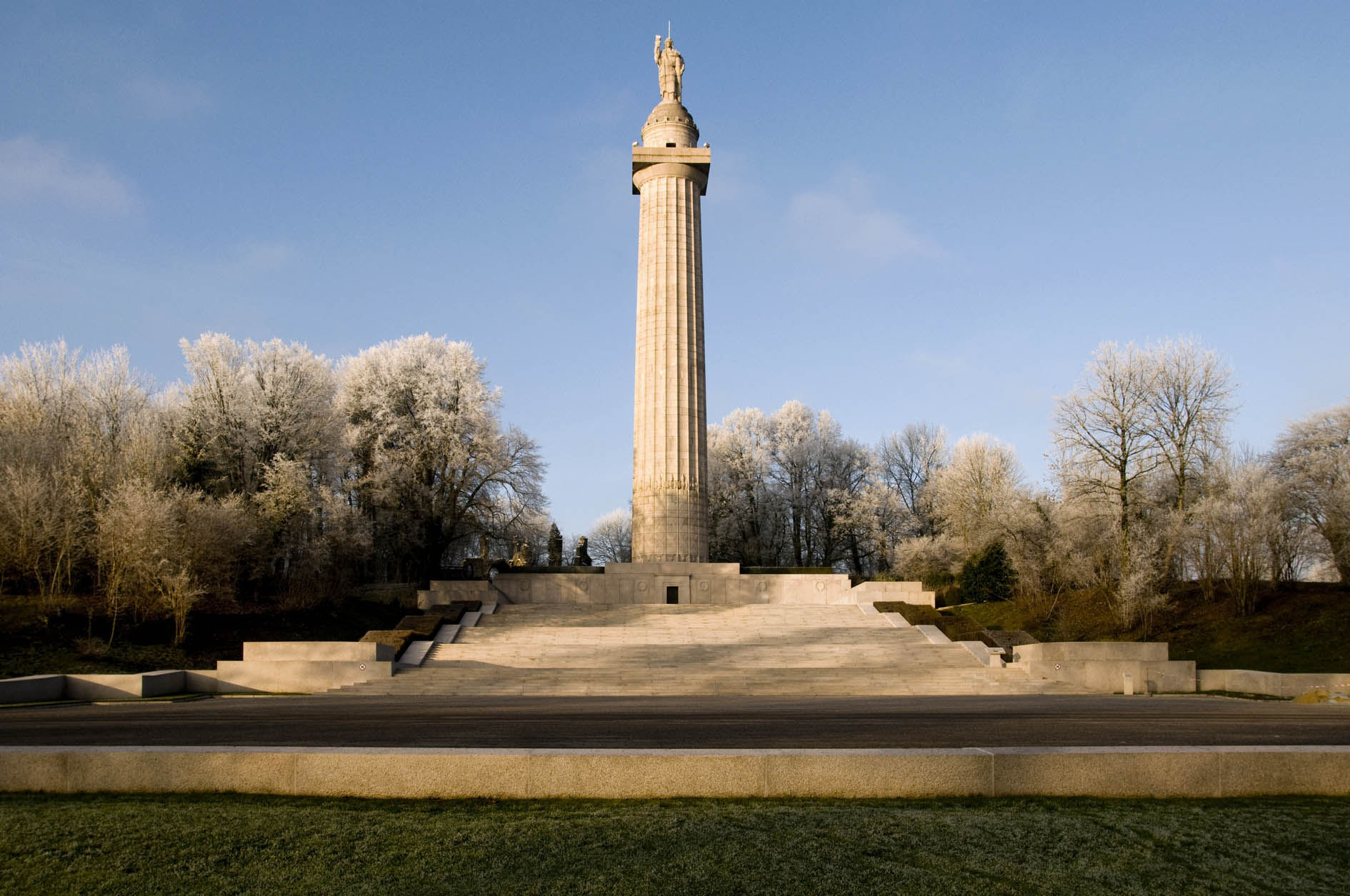
- Main façade of the memorial in December 2008
- For the American First Army victory in the Meuse-Argonne offensive, September 26–November 11, 1918
- Unveiled: August 1, 1937; 89 years ago
- Location: 49°16′21″N 5°08′31″E near Montfaucon, France
- Designed by: John Russell Pope
- Erected by the United States of America to commemorate the brilliant victory of her First Army in the Meuse-Argonne offensive September 26 – November 11, 1918, and to honor the heroic services of the Armies of France on this important battle front during the World War

The Meuse-Argonne American Memorial (Montfaucon American Monument; French: Monument Américain de Montfaucon) is an American World War I memorial commemorating "the brilliant victory of the American First Army in the Meuse-Argonne offensive, September 26 – November 11, 1918, and pays tribute to the previous heroic services of the Armies of France on the important battle front upon which the memorial has been constructed." It was erected by the United States Government and is the largest of the American war memorials in Europe. Outside Montfaucon in the Meuse department in Grand Est in north-eastern France, it was unveiled on August 1, 1937. The memorial was designed by John Russell Pope. He designed a massive, Doric column in granite. It is surmounted by a statue symbolic of liberty and towers 71 metres (233 ft) above the hill and the war ruins of the village around it.

== Description ==
The Meuse-Argonne American Memorial is made of a large Doric-style granite column, on top of which stands a statue symbolizing liberty. The memorial was built near the ruins of the ancient village, destroyed during World War I. On the walls of the foyer is an account of the offensive. It pays homage to the troops who served there. The observation platform of the memorial can be reached by ascending 234 stairs, and offers an excellent view of the battlefield.

Located nearby and constructed to memorialize American troops who lost their lives in World War I, the chapel in the Meuse-Argonne American Cemetery in France is calm and considered a sacred space. Built of light stone in a Romanesque style, it is situated on a hill above the graves. Mosaics, stained glass windows, and an altar honoring the fallen and the 954 missing troops whose names are engraved on the walls can be found within. The chapel represents religion, peace, and the enduring connection between France and the United States. It serves as a reminder to guests of the high price of battle and the importance of sacrifice for one's country.

== Inauguration ==
The memorial was unveiled on August 1, 1937, in the presence of the President of the French Republic, Albert Lebrun. Franklin D. Roosevelt, then the President of the United States, delivered a radio address for the ceremony from Washington, D.C.

== Gallery ==
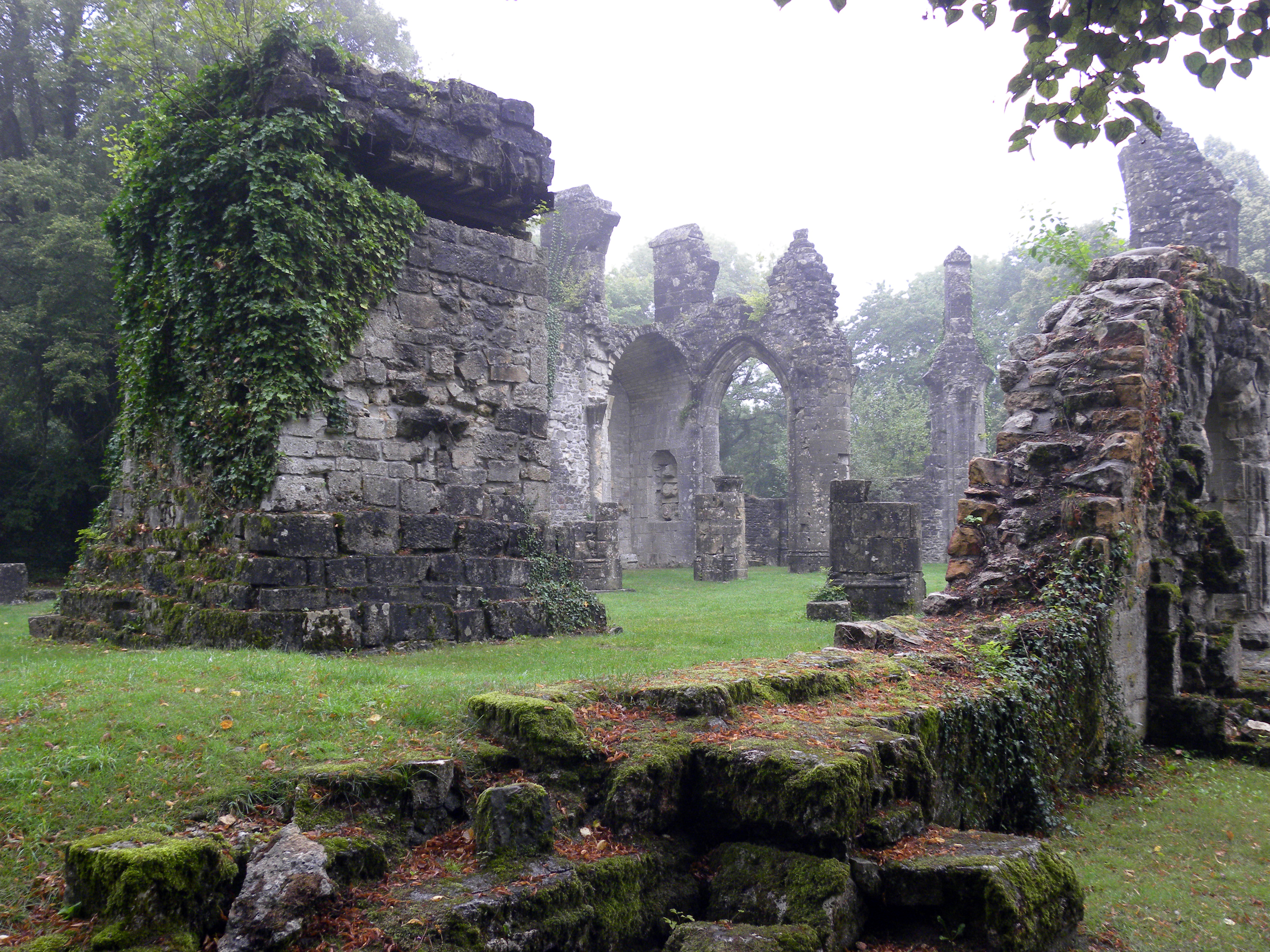
Ruined church at Montfaucon-d'Argonne directly behind the monument. The blocky structure on the left is a German World War I observation post.

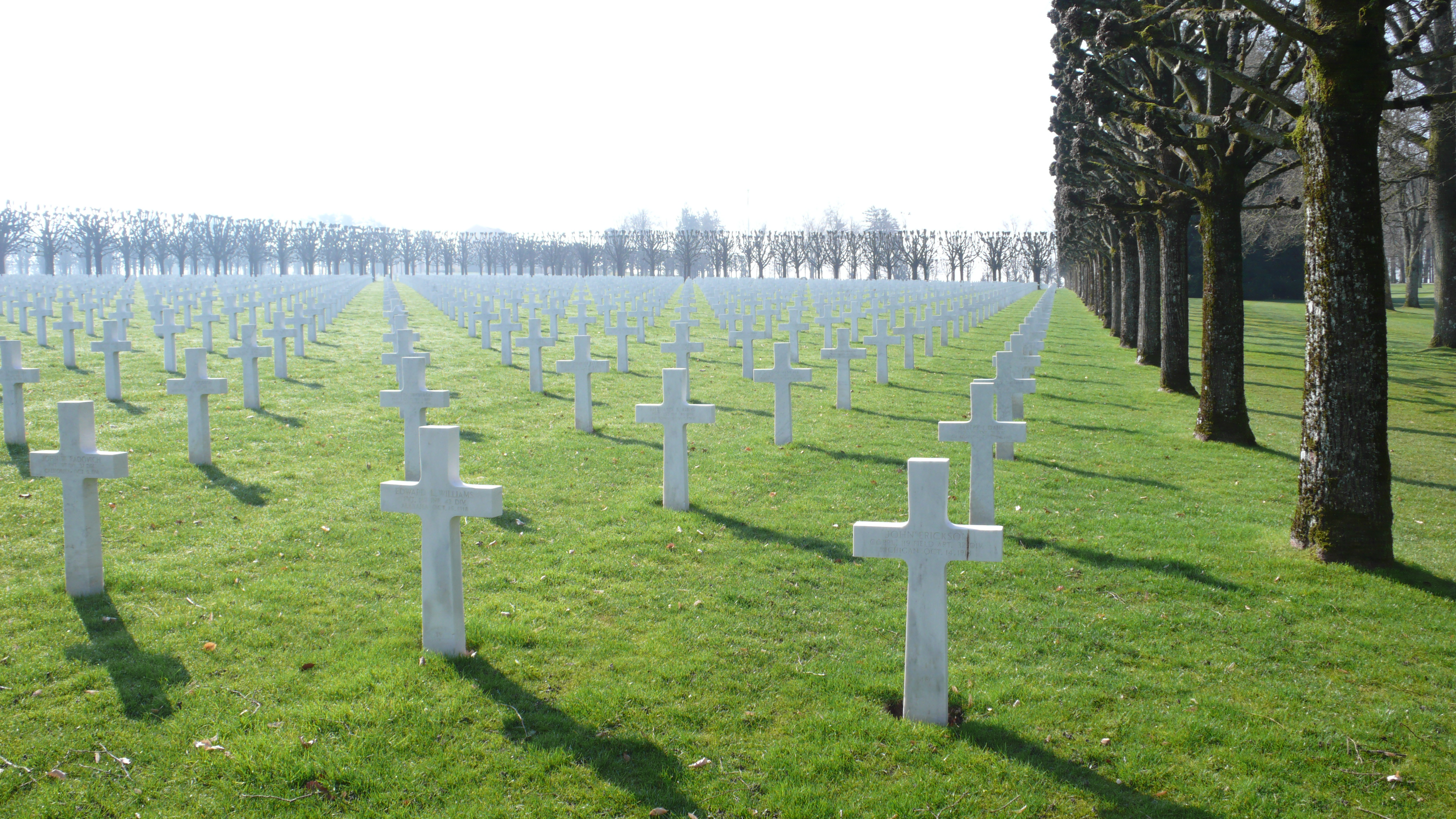
Verdun, Montfaucon, American Monument, American Cemetery

== See also ==
- Meuse-Argonne American Cemetery
- Meuse-Argonne Offensive
- World War I memorials
