= Montfaucon-d'Argonne =

- Commune
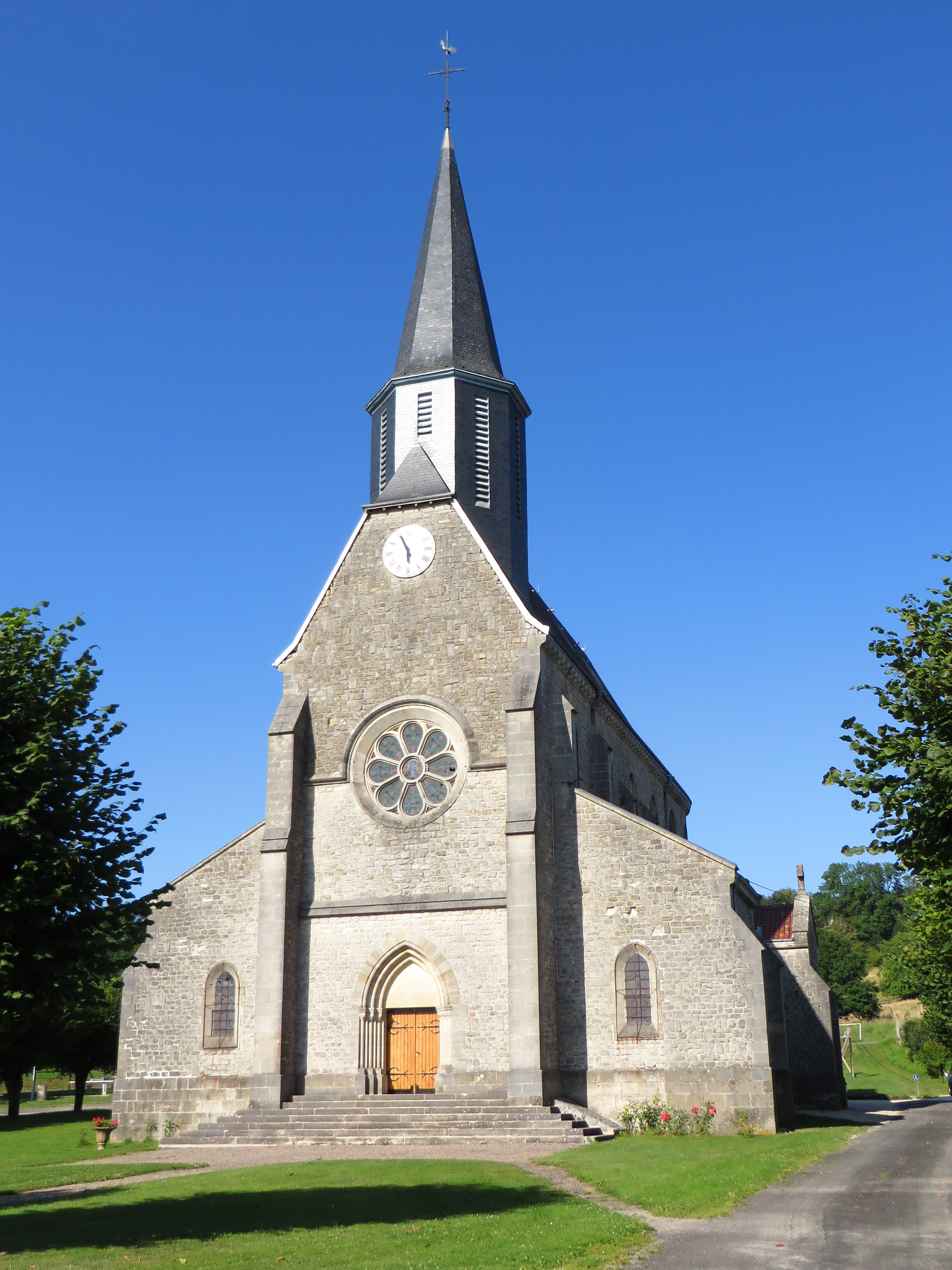
- The church in Montfaucon-d'Argonne

- Coat of arms
- Location of Montfaucon-d'Argonne
- Location within France Location within Grand Est
- Coordinates: 49°16′20″N 5°07′59″E
- Country: France
- Region: Grand Est
- Department: Meuse
- Arrondissement: Verdun
- Canton: Clermont-en-Argonne

Government
  - Mayor (2020–2026): Pauline Astolfi
- Area^{1}: 23.61 km^{2} (9.12 sq mi)
- Elevation: 280 m (920 ft)
- Highest elevation: 338 m (1,109 ft)
- Lowest elevation: 198 m (650 ft)
- Population (2023): 261
  - Density: 11.1/km^{2} (28.6/sq mi)
- Time zone: UTC+01:00 (CET)
  - Summer (DST): UTC+02:00 (CEST)
- INSEE/Postal code: 55346 /55270
- ^{1} French Land Register data, which excludes lakes, ponds, glaciers > 1 km^{2} (0.386 sq mi or 247 acres) and river estuaries.

Montfaucon-d'Argonne (French pronunciation: [mɔ̃fokɔ̃ daʁɡɔn], literally Montfaucon of Argonne, before 1989: Montfaucon) is a commune in the Meuse department in Grand Est in north-eastern France. It is home to the Meuse-Argonne American Memorial.

== See also ==
- Communes of the Meuse department

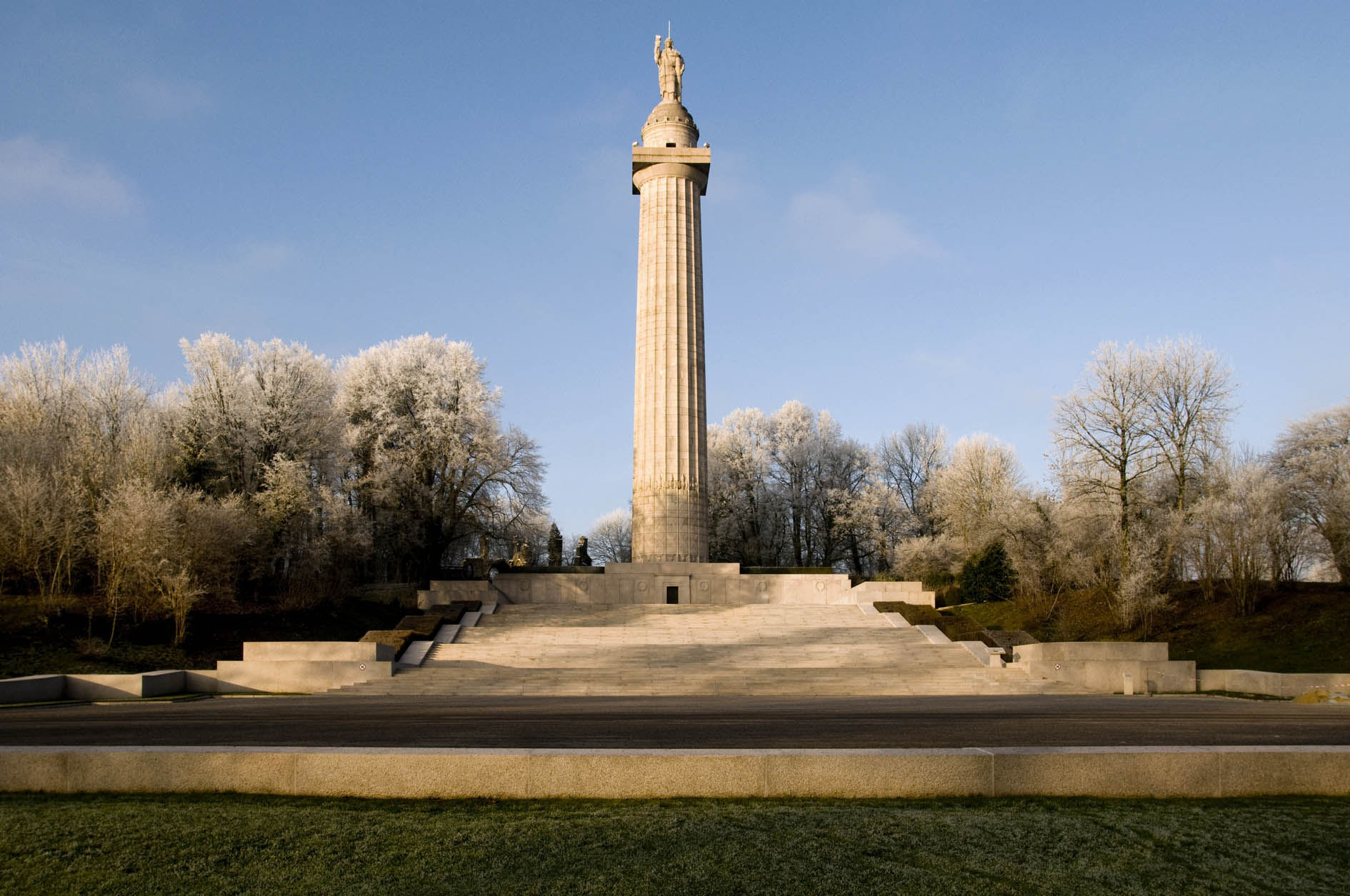
American Memorial.

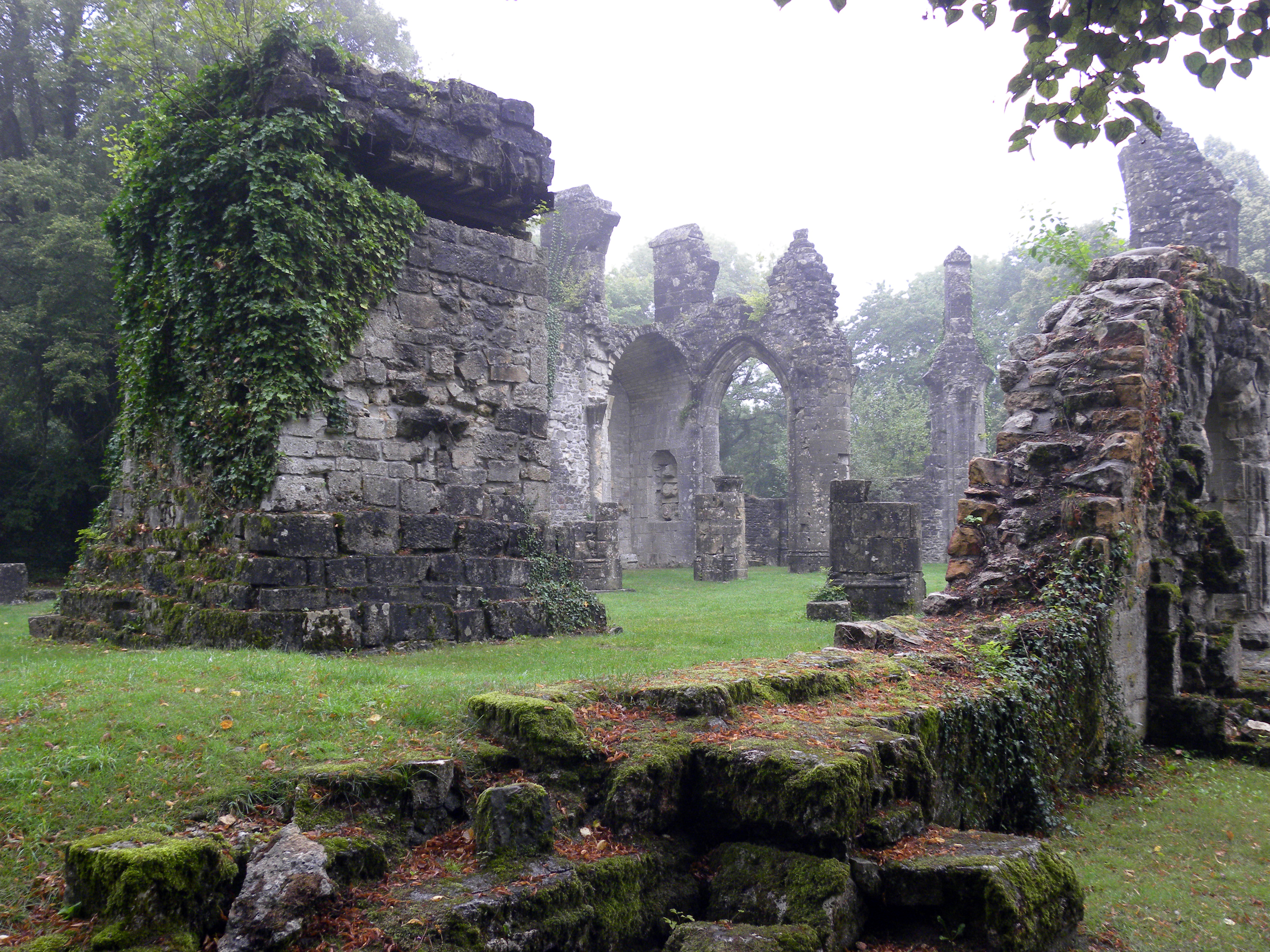
Ruined church at Montfaucon-d'Argonne. The blocky structure on the left is a German WWI observation post.
