= Binarville =

- Commune
- Location of Binarville
- Location within France Location within Grand Est
- Coordinates: 49°14′26″N 4°53′40″E
- Country: France
- Region: Grand Est
- Department: Marne
- Arrondissement: Châlons-en-Champagne
- Canton: Argonne Suippe et Vesle

Government
  - Mayor (2025–2026): Céline Jeannine Habrant
- Area^{1}: 16.61 km^{2} (6.41 sq mi)
- Elevation: 200 m (660 ft)
- Population (2023): 82
  - Density: 4.9/km^{2} (13/sq mi)
- Time zone: UTC+01:00 (CET)
  - Summer (DST): UTC+02:00 (CEST)
- INSEE/Postal code: 51062 /51800
- ^{1} French Land Register data, which excludes lakes, ponds, glaciers > 1 km^{2} (0.386 sq mi or 247 acres) and river estuaries.

Binarville (French pronunciation: [binaʁvil]) is a commune of the Marne department in northeastern France.

== Population ==
Historical population
Year	Pop.	±% p.a.
1968	161	—
1975	145	−1.48%
1982	135	−1.02%
1990	143	+0.72%
1999	124	−1.57%
2007	110	−1.49%
2012	106	−0.74%
2017	99	−1.36%
2023	82	−3.09%
Source: INSEE

== See also ==
- Communes of the Marne department
