= Romagne-sous-Montfaucon =

- Commune
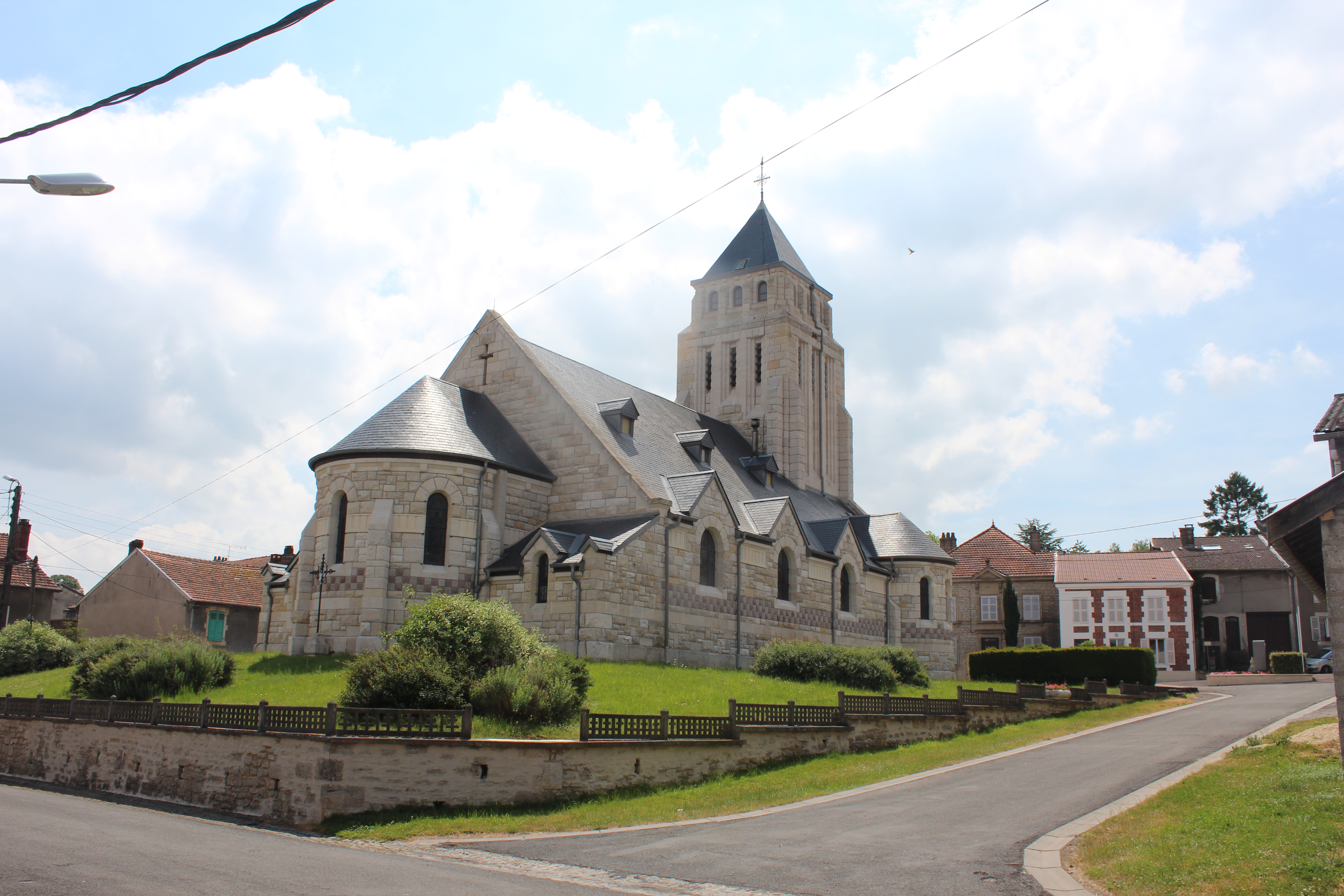
- The church in Romagne-sous-Montfaucon

- Coat of arms
- Location of Romagne-sous-Montfaucon
- Location within France Location within Grand Est
- Coordinates: 49°19′56″N 5°04′58″E
- Country: France
- Region: Grand Est
- Department: Meuse
- Arrondissement: Verdun
- Canton: Clermont-en-Argonne
- Intercommunality: Argonne-Meuse

Government
  - Mayor (2020–2026): Daniel Bertholet
- Area^{1}: 15.7 km^{2} (6.1 sq mi)
- Elevation: 218 m (715 ft)
- Highest elevation: 287 m (942 ft)
- Lowest elevation: 195 m (640 ft)
- Population (2023): 170
  - Density: 11/km^{2} (28/sq mi)
- Time zone: UTC+01:00 (CET)
  - Summer (DST): UTC+02:00 (CEST)
- INSEE/Postal code: 55438 /55110
- ^{1} French Land Register data, which excludes lakes, ponds, glaciers > 1 km^{2} (0.386 sq mi or 247 acres) and river estuaries.

Romagne-sous-Montfaucon (French pronunciation: [ʁɔmaɲ su mɔ̃fokɔ̃], literally Romagne under Montfaucon) is a commune in the Meuse department in Grand Est in north-eastern France. The Commune is home to the Romagne '14-'18 museum of WWI artifacts

Nearby is the American Battle Monuments Commission's Meuse-Argonne American Cemetery for US military killed during the First World War.

== See also ==
- Communes of the Meuse department
