= 278th Armored Cavalry Regiment =

278th Cavalry Regiment
- Shoulder sleeve insignia
- Active: 1887 – present
- Country: United States
- Allegiance: Tennessee Army National Guard
- Branch: United States Army National Guard
- Type: Mobile brigade combat team
- Part of: 36th Infantry Division
- Garrison/HQ: Knoxville, Tennessee
- Nickname: Third Tennessee
- Mottos: "I Volunteer, Sir!"
- Engagements: American Revolutionary War; War of 1812; Mexican War; American Civil War; War with Spain; Mexican Expedition; World War I World War II; Korean War; Iraq War; Operation Atlantic Resolve; Operation Spartan Shield; Operation Inherent Resolve; Operation Epic Fury

Commanders
- Notable commanders: Walter M. Johnson

Insignia
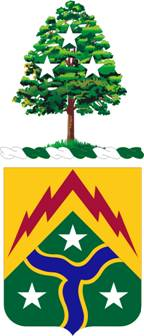
- Coat of Arms

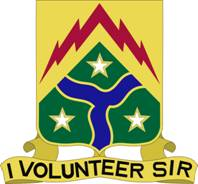
- Distinctive unit insignia

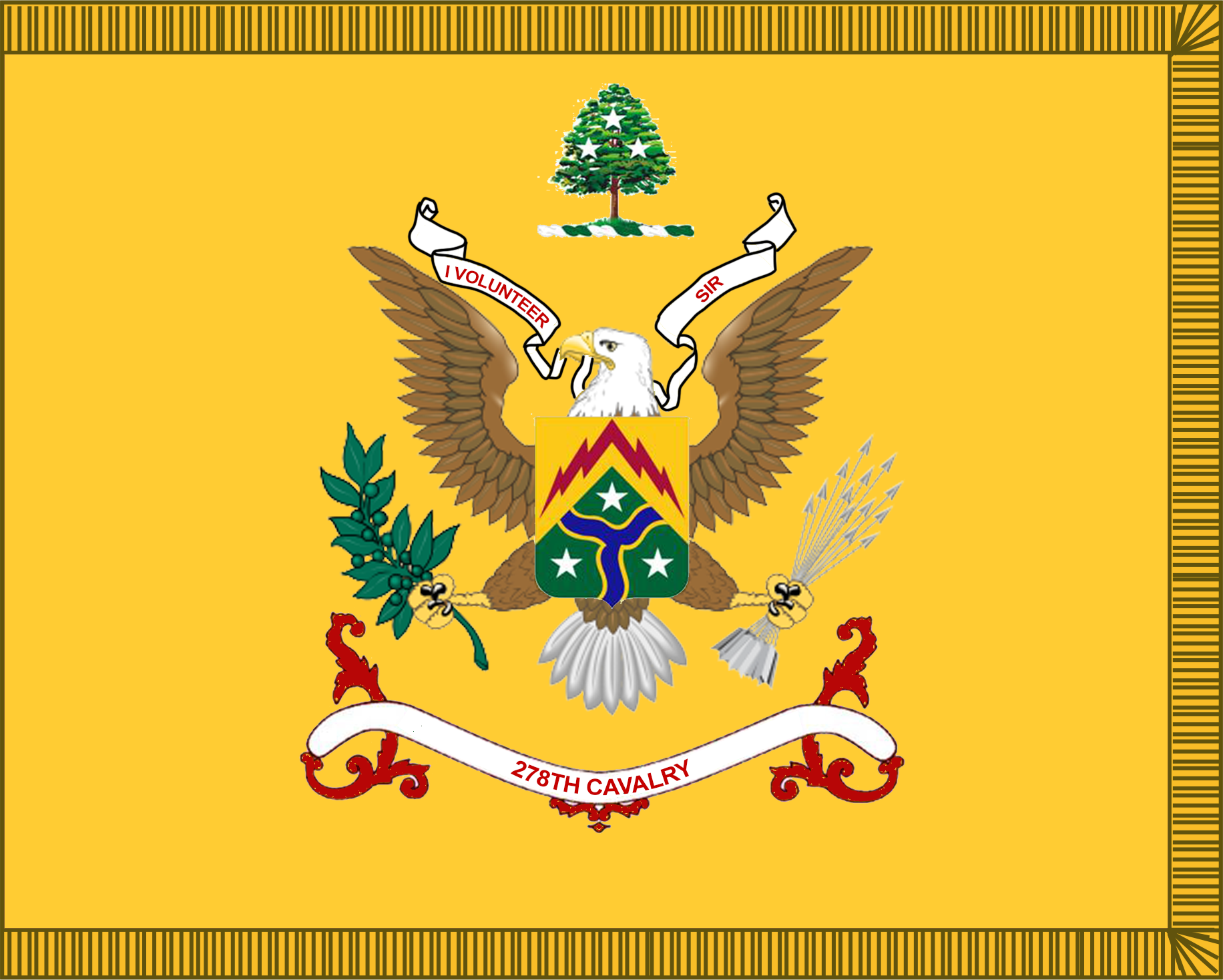
- 278th Armored Cavalry Regiment Flag

The 278th Armored Cavalry Regiment (278th ACR, "Third Tennessee"), previously the 117th Infantry Regiment, is an armored brigade combat team of the Tennessee Army National Guard with headquarters in Knoxville, Tennessee. It is the only National Guard Armored Cavalry Regiment and one of only two in the entire US Army order of battle, the other being the active duty 11th ACR. The unit traces its lineage from the volunteer militias of Eastern Tennessee and has participated in conflicts from the Revolutionary War to the Iraq War (2004-05 and 2009-10). In May 2025, the Pentagon announced that the 278th Armored Cavalry Regiment will convert to a Mobile Brigade Combat Team.

== Missions ==
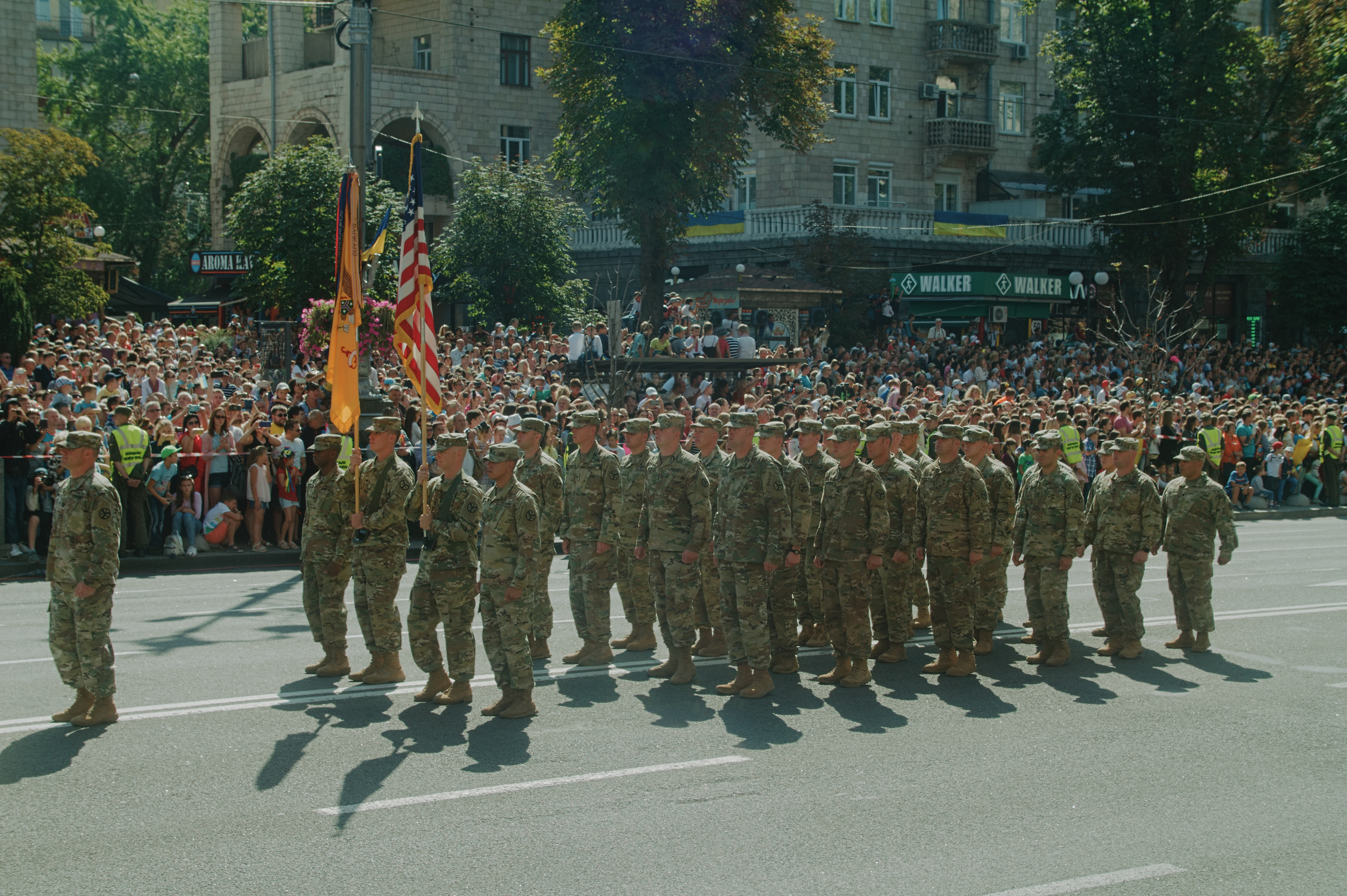
Members of the regiment during a parade in Kyiv, August 2018.

- State mission

Provide trained and disciplined troops for domestic emergencies or as otherwise required by state law.

- Federal mission

Maintain properly trained and equipped units available for prompt mobilization for war, national emergency, or as otherwise needed.

== History ==
=== Formation of predecessor units ===
The Third Brigade of the Tennessee Militia was absorbed into the National Guard of the United States on 25 March 1887 as the 3rd Infantry Regiment, with headquarters in Knoxville. The 1st Battalion was located in Knoxville, and the 2nd Battalion was located in Chattanooga. In the spring of 1898, the battalions were consolidated to form the 6th Infantry Regiment. Between 18 and 20 May 1898, the 6th Infantry was re-designated as the 3rd Tennessee Volunteer Infantry Regiment..

=== Spanish–American War ===
The 3rd Tennessee was mustered into federal service from 18–20 May 1898 at Camp Dewy, Nashville, for the war with Spain. The 3rd Tennessee was deployed to Tampa, Florida, and later mustered out of federal service at Anniston, Alabama, on 31 January 1899. It was reorganized in Knoxville in the Tennessee National Guard as the 6th Infantry Regiment. In 1903, the 6th Infantry Regiment was redesignated once again as the 3rd Infantry Regiment.

=== Mexican Punitive Expedition ===
On 3 July 1916, the 3rd Infantry Regiment was mustered into federal service at Nashville and deployed to Eagle Pass, Texas, to take part in the Army's pursuit of the Mexican bandit Francisco "Pancho" Villa along the Mexico-U.S. border. They returned home and were mustered out of federal service on 14 March 1917.

=== World War I ===
Four months after returning from Texas, on 24 July 1917, the 3rd Infantry Regiment was mustered into federal service and assigned as an element of the 30th Division. On 3 August, the War Department ordered concentration and organization of the units designated to form the division at Camp Sevier, Greenville, South Carolina. On 5 August 1917 the 3rd Tennessee Infantry Regiment was "drafted" into federal service. Concentration continued throughout August 1917.

The 30th Division (the "Old Hickory" Division, named after President Andrew Jackson of Tennessee) was reorganized in accordance with the tables of organization of 8 August 1917. On 12 September 1917 infantry brigades were organized in the 30th Division. The 59th Infantry Brigade was composed of the 3rd Tennessee and the 1st South Carolina Regiments of Infantry, and detachments of the 1st North Carolina and 2nd South Carolina Regiments of Infantry, and the Tennessee Cavalry. The 60th Infantry Brigade included, the 2nd and 3rd North Carolina Regiments of Infantry, and detachments of the 1st North Carolina and 2nd Tennessee Regiments of Infantry and of North Carolina Cavalry. On 14 September 1917 the 3rd Tennessee Infantry Regiment was reorganized and re-designated as the 117th Infantry Regiment assigned to the 30th Division.

The 30th Division underwent systematic training from 17 September until 30 April 1918. During October 1917, Selective Service men from Camps Gordon, Jackson and Pike completed the regiment and filled out the rest of the division.

The 117th Infantry Regiment as part of the 59th Brigade, 30th Infantry Division received its first taste of war on 9 July 1918. With the 27th (US) Division, it was assigned to the organization and defense of the East Poperinghe Line, a third defensive position in the Dickebusch Lake and Scherpenberg Sectors. The 30th Division on 11 July 1918 assumed full responsibility for the East Poperinghe trench system.

Affiliated with the British, 117th Infantry Regiment as part of the 30th Division reached the front lines for training on 16 July 1918 and remained until 18 August. Actual training was carried until 9 August. The 117th Infantry Regiment and the rest of the 59th Infantry Brigade remained with the British 3rd (GB) Division, while the machine gun and infantry units served by battalions and other divisional troops by detachments remained with 30th Division.

After a brief return to the rear for further training, the 30th Division relieved the 3rd (GB) Division in the front line of the Canal Sector from the vicinity of Elzenwalle to the railroad southeast of Transport Fme on the nights of 16 and 17 August 1918. On 18 August 1918 the 30th Division (US) assumed command, with the 6th (GB) Division to its right. On the next day the Canal Sector occupation was merged into the Ypres-Lys Operation.

From 19 August until 4 September 30 (US) Division, less Artillery and 105th Ammunition Trains took part in the Ypres- Lys Operation. 26 August – 11 September rumors of a German withdrawal of troops was investigated. 31 August combat patrols of the 30th (US) Division determined that the Germans were withdrawing. The next day, the 59th Infantry Brigade leading, the division captured Moated Orange, Voormezeele, Lock No. 8, and Lankhof Fme, and occupied a line connecting these localities with the original front at Gunners' Lodge. The 27th (US) Division served to the right, the 14th (GB) Division to the left.

On the nights of 3 through 5 September, the 30th Division (US) was relieved by the 35th (GB) Division, and on 4 September, the command passed. The 30th (US) Division concentrated near Proven on 5 September and 6, and moved into the St. Pol Area, in the zone of the British First Army on 7 September for training.

Meanwhile, on 12–15 September, the 37th Infantry Division, along with the two 30th Division units, occupied the Avocourt Sector on 23–25 September 1918.

The 30th (US) Division, less artillery, and the 105th Ammunition Train participated in the Somme Offensive Operation 22 September – 1 October. On the nights of 21 to 24 September 1918, the 30th (US) Division moved to the Tincourt-Boucly (British Fourth Army) Area, where the Second Corps was affiliated with the Australian 1st Division, east of Villeret and Hargicourt. The lines extended from 300 meters east of Buisson-Gaulaine Fme, through La Haute Bruyere, la Terrasse Trench, Bois des Tuyas, Boyeu du Chevreau, to Malakoff Fme. The 59th Infantry Brigade occupied the forward area. Command passed to the 30th (US) Division on 24 September 1918.

On 26–27 September 30 (US) Division attacked from a line of departure between 300 and 400 meters east of the line between La Haute Bruyere and Malakoff Fme, with the 46th (GB) Division on the right, and the 27th (US) Division on the left. On the night of 27 September and 28, the 60th Infantry Brigade relieved the 59th Infantry Brigade and the 117th Infantry Regiment.

On 29 September 1918 the 30th (US) Division with the 59th and 60th Infantry Brigades in the lead, battered through the formidable Hindenburg Line. Immediately after the penetration, the 30th Division crossed the canal and captured Bellicourt, then entered Nauroy. It was at Bellicourt, France, that the 30th Division smashed its way through the "Hindenburg Line", a victory that hastened the close of the war.

The 5th Division (Australia) moved up to pass through the 30th (US) Division, and both divisions advanced to establish a front from the intersection of Wattling Street road and canal, east and northeast to Bois du Cabaret, 800 meters northeast of the Boise de Malakoff. The next day the command passed to the Australian 5th Division, but units of the 30th (US) Division, which were in line, participated until noon.

During its advance of 20 miles (32 km), the 30th (US) Division captured 98 officers, 3,750 enlisted men, 72 pieces of artillery, 26 trench mortars and 426 machine guns. It suffered 8,415 casualties.

On 1 and 2 October 1918, the 117th Infantry Regiment as part of the 59th Infantry Brigade, 30th (US) Division moved to the Heroecourt and Mesnil-Bruntel Areas, and on the 5th, the II Corps prepared to relieve the Australian troops in the front line. Returning to the front the 117th Infantry as part of the 59th Infantry Brigade and other units moved to the Tincourt-Boucly Area.

On the night of 5 and 6 October 1918 the 59th Infantry Brigade took position in support near Hargicourt and Bellicourt. The next day the 59th Infantry Brigade attacked to realign the front.

The 30th (US) Division on 8 October, assisted by tanks had the 59th Infantry Brigade and one battalion from the 60th Infantry Brigade, leading, attacked northeast, and captured Brancourt-le-Grand and Premont, and reached a line from the Fme de la Piete to the eastern outskirts of Premont. The 6th (GB) Division served on the right, while the 25th (GB) Division was on the left. The 60th Infantry Brigade passed through the 59th on 9 October, and captured Busigny and Becquigny. The next day the division front extended along the western outskirts of Vaux-Andigny, through La Haie-Menneresse, and St. Souplet, to St. Benin.

During this advance on 7 October 1918 Sergeant Edward R. Talley, from Russellville, Tennessee, Company L, 117th Infantry Regiment near Ponchaux, France, was undeterred by seeing several comrades killed in attempting to put a hostile machinegun nest out of action. He attacked the position single-handed, armed only with his Springfield 03 rifle. Sergeant Talley rushed the machinegun nest in the face of intense enemy fire, killed or wounded at least 6 of the crew, and silenced the gun. When the enemy attempted to bring forward another gun and ammunition Sergeant Talley drove them back by effective fire from his rifle. For this action, he was awarded the Medal of Honor.

The next day, Sergeant James Ernest Karnes from Knoxville, and Private Calvin John Ward from Morristown, Company D, 117th Infantry Regiment near Estrees, France, on 8 October 1918 were taking part in a general advance. Their company was held up by a machinegun, which was enfilading the line of troops. These two soldiers "had all they could take" so they fixed their bayonets and charged the machine gun position and succeeded in destroying the machine gun nest by killing 3 and capturing 7 of the enemy and their guns. Sergeant Karnes and Private Ward were both awarded the Medal of Honor for this action.

On 11 October, the 30th (US) Division occupied Vaux-Andigny, La Haie-Menneresse, and reached the northwestern outskirts of St. Martin-Riviere, its front extending north along the West Bank of the La Selle River to St. Benin. It was relieved during the night of 11/12 October and 1918 by the 27th (US) Division, and rested near Premont, Brancourt-le-Grand, and Monibrehain. Command passed on 12 October 1918.

The 30th (US) Division returned to the line on the night of 15/16 October 1918. The 59th Infantry Brigade relieved the 54th Infantry Brigade (27th Division), in the right sector of the II Corps from Vaux-Andigny to one-half kilometer west of St. Martin-Riviere. The 6th (GB) Division on the right, 27th Division (US) on the left. On 17 October 30 (US) Division attacked northeast, crossing the La Selle River, captured Molain and established a line from three-quarters kilometer north of La Demi-Lieue to l'Arbre-de-Guise. The next day Ribeauville was occupied. The front extended from Rejet-de-Beaulieu to three-quarters kilometer southeast of la Jonquiere Fme, on 19 October 1918.

The 30th (US) Division was relieved by the 1st (GB) Division on the night of 19/20 October and moved, 20–23 October to the vicinity of Tincourt-Boucly and Roisel. The division moved to Querrieu Area on 23 October 1918 for rehabilitation and training.

The 117th Infantry moved back to the United States after the signing of the Armistice on 11 November 1918 and was demobilized during 13–17 April 1919 at Fort Oglethorpe, Georgia near Chattanooga.

In 1921, a monument to the 117th Infantry was erected in front of the old Knoxville High School on the corner of E 5th Ave NE & Lamar St NE. It consists of a charging soldier with raised fist and rifle. Several plaques around the base honor the soldiers killed in action and list accomplishments of the regiment.

=== Interwar period ===
The 117th Infantry Regiment arrived at the port of Charleston on 27 March 1919 on the troopship USS Pocahontas and was demobilized 17 April 1919 at Fort Oglethorpe, Georgia. Per the National Defense Act of 1920, the 117th Infantry was reconstituted in the National Guard in 1921, assigned to the 30th Division, and allotted to the state of Tennessee. It was reorganized on 30 April 1921 by consolidation with the 4th Infantry, Tennessee National Guard (headquarters organized 28 April 1918 and federally recognized at Chattanooga, Tennessee) and redesignation as the 117th Infantry. Federal recognition was withdrawn on 15 October 1921; the headquarters was relocated to Knoxville, Tennessee, and federally recognized on 24 April 1923, and relocated 1 October 1933 to Jackson, Tennessee. The regiment, or elements thereof, were called up to perform the following state duties: two companies performed escort duty in connection with protecting civil prisoners at Springfield, Tennessee, 21 July 1932; flood relief duties along the Arkansas River near Memphis, Tennessee, in January 1937; 1st Battalion for riot control at a workers strike at Alcoa, Tennessee, 7–14 July 1937; riot control at the Democratic Party primary election in Memphis, Tennessee, 30 July 1938. Conducted annual summer training most years at Camp Peay, Tennessee, but also at Camp John Sevier, South Carolina, or Camp (later Fort) Jackson, South Carolina.

=== World War II ===
On 16 September 1940, the 117th Infantry Regiment was inducted into federal service at home stations for a period of one year. The regiment was moved by train and arrived at Fort Jackson, South Carolina, on 24 September 1940. The regiment was housed in pyramidal tents at Fort Jackson. Colonel Grant A. Schlieker assumed command of the regiment on 12 August 1940. In October 1940, the unit was brought to war strength with Selective Service men, primarily from the Knoxville area.

The 117th Infantry moved by motor convoy to Dixie, Tennessee, on 27 May 1941 for the VII Corps Tennessee Maneuvers. The regiment returned to Fort Jackson on 5 July 1941.The regiment then moved to Chester, South Carolina, on 27 September 1941 for both the October and November 1941 Carolina Maneuvers. The 117th Infantry Regiment as part of the 30th Division returned to Fort Jackson on 29 November 1941, where the 30th Division was redesigned as the 30th Infantry Division. After the Japanese attack on Pearl Harbor, the term of service of the regiment, along with the rest of the National Guard soldiers inducted in 1940-1941, was extended for the duration of the war.

On 16 February 1942, two months after American entry into World War II, the 30th Infantry Division arrived at Camp Blanding, Florida, for extensive infantry training. On 12 September 1942, the 117th Infantry Regiment was ordered to the Infantry School, located at Fort Benning, Georgia, to furnish troops for demonstration purposes and to assist instructors in the training of officer classes at the Officer Candidate School (OCS). The 117th Infantry Regiment moved back to Camp Blanding, Florida, by motor convoy on 28 February 1943 to conduct training designed to physically harden the troops.

They moved on 30 May 1943 to Murfreesboro, Tennessee. Starting on 4 September 1943, the regiment participated in the Second Army No. 3 Tennessee Maneuvers. On 7 September 1943 the 117th Infantry Regiment returned to Camp Forrest, near Tullahoma, Tennessee.

The 117th Infantry Regiment arrived at Camp Atterbury, Indiana, on 14 November 1943 to complete their final phase of training. The 117th Infantry Regiment departed Camp Atterbury and arrived at the staging area at Camp Myles Standish, Massachusetts, on 29 January 1944. The regiment departed from the Port of Boston on the troopship USS John Ericsson on 12 February 1944. The 117th Infantry Regiment disembarked in Liverpool, England, on 24 February 1944.

In England, from 25 February, to 5 April 1944 the regiment was quartered in Nissen huts near Petworth, England, and undertook extensive Infantry training. From 6 April to 9 June 1944, the regiment was billeted in the town of Berkhamsted, England, and completed their final training before entering combat in Normandy.

On "D-Day" 6 June 1944 the regiment was alerted for movement to France. The regiment moved to a staging area in southern England, where a briefing was given on the general situation, then moved to the Southampton docks for loading.

The 117th Infantry Regiment crossed the English Channel and landed on Omaha Beach in Normandy on D+4, 10 June 1944. The regiment initially moved into a staging area near Lison, France. The regiment remained here until 2 July 1944. The first casualties of World War II were suffered here as a result of German 88 mm fire on the staging area. The regiment's initial mission was to replace some units of the 29th Division which had been almost immediately lost on D-Day. The balance of the 30th Infantry Division went into Normandy and was almost immediately committed to action against the German Army.

The 117th Infantry Regiment attacked across the Vire river along with the 120th Infantry at 04:30 am the morning of 7 July 1944 as part of the initial breakout from the Normandy Beachhead. They assaulted across the Vire-Taute Canal on 7 July 1944, establishing a bridgehead toward Les Landes, east of St Jean-de-Day, which the 3rd Armored Division passed through the regiment to conduct exploitation operations.

The regiment repulsed a major German counter-attack conducted by the German Panzer-Lehr-Division the night of 7 July 1944 and again during the morning of 9 July 1944. The Germans suffered heavy losses as the result of the Tennessee guardsmen's tenacious fighting and accurate fire.

As the 117th Infantry advanced on Saint-Lô, as part of the 30th (US) Infantry Division, it checked a German counterattack along the main Hauts-Vents Highway 11 July 1944 and Pont Hebert fell after protracted fighting 14 July 1944. Patrols reached the Periers-Saint-Lô Road by 18 July 1944.

VII (US) Corps made the main effort along the St. Lo-Periers highway just west of Saint-Lô. The corps commander's intent was to drive through the German crust-like defense before the Germans could reform, then exploit the break thought by passing mechanized forces into the Germans' rear. The plan called for saturation bombing by fighter-bombers, medium and heavy bombers from the front line back to the enemy's artillery positions to disorient and dislodge the Germans. Following the bombers, 4th(US) Infantry Division, 9th (US) Infantry Division, and the 30th (US) Infantry Division were to attack southward along a narrow front, clearing the way for the 2d (US) and 3d (US) Armored Divisions and the 1st (US) Infantry Division to pass through. The armored forces were to sweep south then southwest into the rear of German forces opposing the VIII Corps along the western portions of the Cotentin Peninsula.

The 30th (US) Infantry Division attacked with the 120th Infantry Regiment on the right and 119th Infantry Division on the left. Two battalions from the 117th Infantry Regiment were attached (one battalion each) to the 119th and 120th Infantry Regiments. The remainder of the 117th Infantry was in division reserve prepared to pass through on the left and clear out the curve in the Vier River.

The air plan called for 350 fighter-bombers hitting the German front lines followed by 1,500 bombers assigned to targets 2,500 yards (2,300 m) deep and 6,000 yards (5,500 m) wide. As the friendly troops moved forward, another 396 medium bombers would bomb the rear areas for another 45 minutes. Friendly troops were moved back 1,200 yards (1,100 m) from their line of departures for safety.

After two postponements due to bad weather, the attack got underway on the morning of 24 July 1944. At 11:30 am, 350 P-47 fighter-bombers arrived on schedule and started dive-bombing, followed by the steady drone 1,500 heavy bombers. Some P-47 fighter-bombers bombed friendly troop positions and one squadron of heavy bombers dropped its bombs squarely on friendly troops. Twenty minutes after the attack started it was called off. "Operation COBRA" the breakout from St. Lo, the 30th Infantry Division endured the heaviest bombing by "friendly aircraft" of the entire war. Approximately 88 men were killed and over 500 seriously wounded over the two-day period. Lieutenant General Lesley J. McNair, Commanding General Army Ground Forces, was visiting and observing this attack in the area of the Second Battalion, 120th Infantry, 30th Infantry Division when bombs instantly killed him dropped by friendly B-17s flying in support of Operation COBRA.

The two battalions of the 117th attacked with the units to which they were attached on 25 July 1944 to drive beyond Saint-Lô during Operation COBRA. On 26 July 1944 the 117th Infantry Regiment took the high ground overlooking Saint-Lô. The Armor and Infantry Forces passed through the hole in the German defenses and advanced south. The 30th Infantry Division had made a spectacular attack, and opened the way for Patton's newly arrived Third Army to drive into Brittany and onward to Brest, France.

The division took well-defended Troisgots on 31 July 1944 and relieved the 1st Infantry Division near Mortain, France, on 6 August 1944. The 30th Infantry Division and the 117th Infantry Regiment was subjected to a strong German counterattack, which ruptured its lines in the area on the following day during the battle for Avranches.

In the morning of 6 August 1944, the regiment moved southwest to the vicinity of Bracy, France near Mortain to relieve the 26th Infantry and to take up defensive positions. At dusk, it was apparent the Germans were in the 1st Battalion's area in strength. About 01:30 am, on 7 August 1944 the 117th Infantry Regiment was attacked by crack troops of the 1st SS Adolf Hitler Division. Between midnight and 04:00 the regiment was blanketed by intense and devastating mortar and artillery fire. Enemy aircraft strafed supporting Artillery units as they tried to register their fire on Germany tanks and infantry. The situation became critical at dawn when the main body of the Germans attacked in a thick fog and overran two company roadblocks. C Company of the 117th Infantry held their position, which caused the Germans to pause in their attack. Colonel Walter M. Johnson, the regimental commander issued orders to hold at all costs because there was nothing behind the 117th Infantry Regiment to stop the Germans from reaching the sea. A new defensive line was established on a sunken road bisected by the highway from Juvigny to Saint Barthelemy and situated on a hill overlooking Saint Barthelemy. Cooks, clerks, messengers, and administrative personnel from the battalions and the regimental headquarters became riflemen. The Tennessee Infantrymen held their positions against intense attacks by German infantry and armor.

Late in the afternoon of 8 August 1944, the Germans launched a fresh large-scale attack employing numerous tanks and fresh Infantry. Despite the terrible odds, the 117th Infantry Regiment stopped the German assault. Determined and stubborn Tennessee riflemen and machine gunners held their positions and stopped the German Infantrymen. Company B from Athens, Tennessee bore the brunt of the attack. Private Timothy L. Birt of Company B was a platoon runner and ended up as the runner for all the platoons. Through heavy enemy fire he carried orders, ammunition, rations and mail from the company command post to all the platoons. On six occasions he repaired telephone lines between the CP and the platoons. He helped evacuate seriously wounded soldiers from an open field under intense enemy fire. Twice he went with litter bearers to help evacuate the wounded. Once during the battle he served as observer and adjusted the company's 60 mm mortar fire. Private Birt, from rural Meigs County, Tennessee was awarded the Distinguished Service Cross for his bravery.

During combat at Mortain and Saint-Barthelemy, the 117th Infantry Regiment and the 30th Infantry Division became known as the Workhorse of the Western Front. It was also known as "Roosevelt's SS Troops," so named by German high command because of the consistent vigor and pressure the division brought to bear on the elite 1st SS Adolf Hitler Division. According to three of Germany's top generals interviewed after World War II, (Jodl, Keitel and von Kesslring) the battle for Mortain and Saint-Barthelemy was one of the two critical operations leading to the defeat of Germany in the west. Mainly the 1st Battalion, 117th Infantry at Saint-Barthelemy, absorbed the main drive of the Germany Army in Normandy, thus allowing Lieutenant General George Patton's armored forces to race forward through France, thereby shortening the war by many months.

The 117th Infantry Regiment went over to the offensive again 11 August 1944 and forced back German gains to Mortain. The 117th Infantry Regiment along with the rest of the 30th (US) Infantry Division then pushed east behind the 2nd Armored Division, taking Nonancourt on 21 August 1944.

The 117th Infantry Regiment was moved by truck on 14 August to the vicinity of Rouelle near Domfront France. German artillery fired on the battalions of the regiment forcing them to dismount and move on foot to l’Onlay-l’Abbaye, France. Tennessee's 117th Infantry Regiment crossed the Seine river near Mantes-Grassicourt 25 miles (40 km) west of Paris to relieve the 79th (US) Infantry Division, which had established a bridgehead across the Seine River. After two days of fighting the regiment was moving quickly in open country towards Belgium.

The 30th (US) Infantry Division (with the 117th Infantry Regiment) was the first American infantry division to enter Belgium 2 September 1944, and advanced over the Meuse River at Vise and Liège 11 September 1944. The 117th Infantry Regiment was the first Allied unit to enter the Netherlands on 13 September 1944.

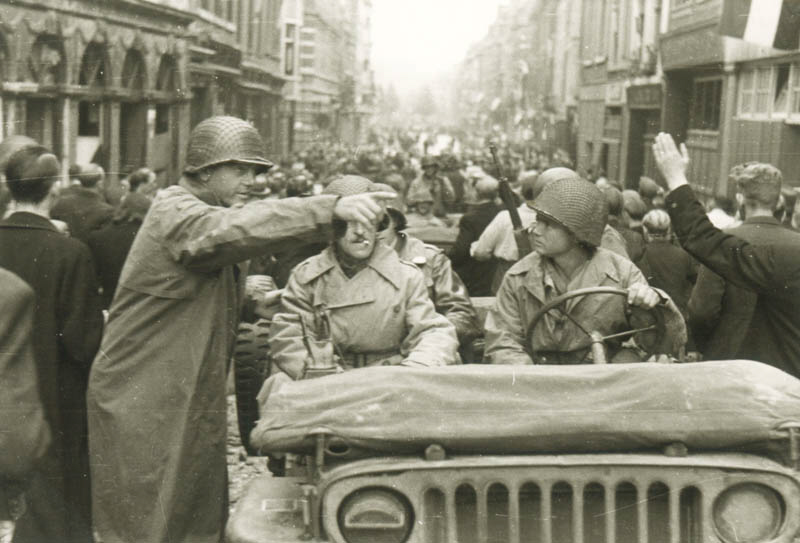
An army jeep with commander Walter Morris Johnson of the 117th Regiment of the US Army 30th Division ("Old Hickory") arrives in Wycker Brugstraat near the Meuse bridge in Maastricht, Netherlands, 13 September 1944.

On 14 September 1944 the 117th and 119th Infantry advanced into Maastricht east of the Meuse River where the 2d Battalion, 117th Infantry Regiment cleared the area west of the river.

The 117th Infantry Regiment attacked from Maastricht towards the German border in the vicinity of Scherpenseel Germany starting on the morning of 17 September 1944. Here German resistance intensified as the Germans employed 155 mm artillery against the regiment as they approached the border.

On the afternoon of 19 September 1944 the 1st Battalion crossed into Germany and entered the town of Scherpenseel. The next morning, the regiment planned the attack on the Siegfried Line, which the German claimed to be invincible fortress.

The 119th and 120th Infantry attacked toward the West Wall north of Aachen and the former reached positions commanding the Wurm River on 18 September 1944. The 30th Infantry Division attacked across the Rhine River between Aachen and Geilenkirchen 2 October 1944 against strong German opposition. On the following day the 117th Infantry Regiment seized Uebach after house-to-house fighting as the 119th Infantry finally captured Rimburg Castle.

At 11:00 hrs, 2 October 1944, the 117th Infantry, along with the rest of the 30th Infantry Division, launched an attack on the Siegfried Line near Palenberg, Germany. It was here that Private Harold G. Kiner from Aline, Oklahoma, of Company F, 117th Infantry Regiment won the Medal of Honor. With four other men, Private Kiner was leading a frontal assault on a Siegfried Line pillbox near Palenberg, Germany. Machinegun fire from the strongly defended enemy position 25 yards (23 m) away pinned down the attackers. The Germans threw hand grenades, one of which dropped between Private Kiner and two other men. With no hesitation, Private Kiner hurled himself upon the grenade, smothering the explosion. By his gallant action and voluntary sacrifice of his own life, he saved his two comrades from serious injury or death. The Medal of Honor was awarded posthumously to Private Kiner. Private Kiner was the fourth soldier from the regiment to be awarded the Medal of Honor.

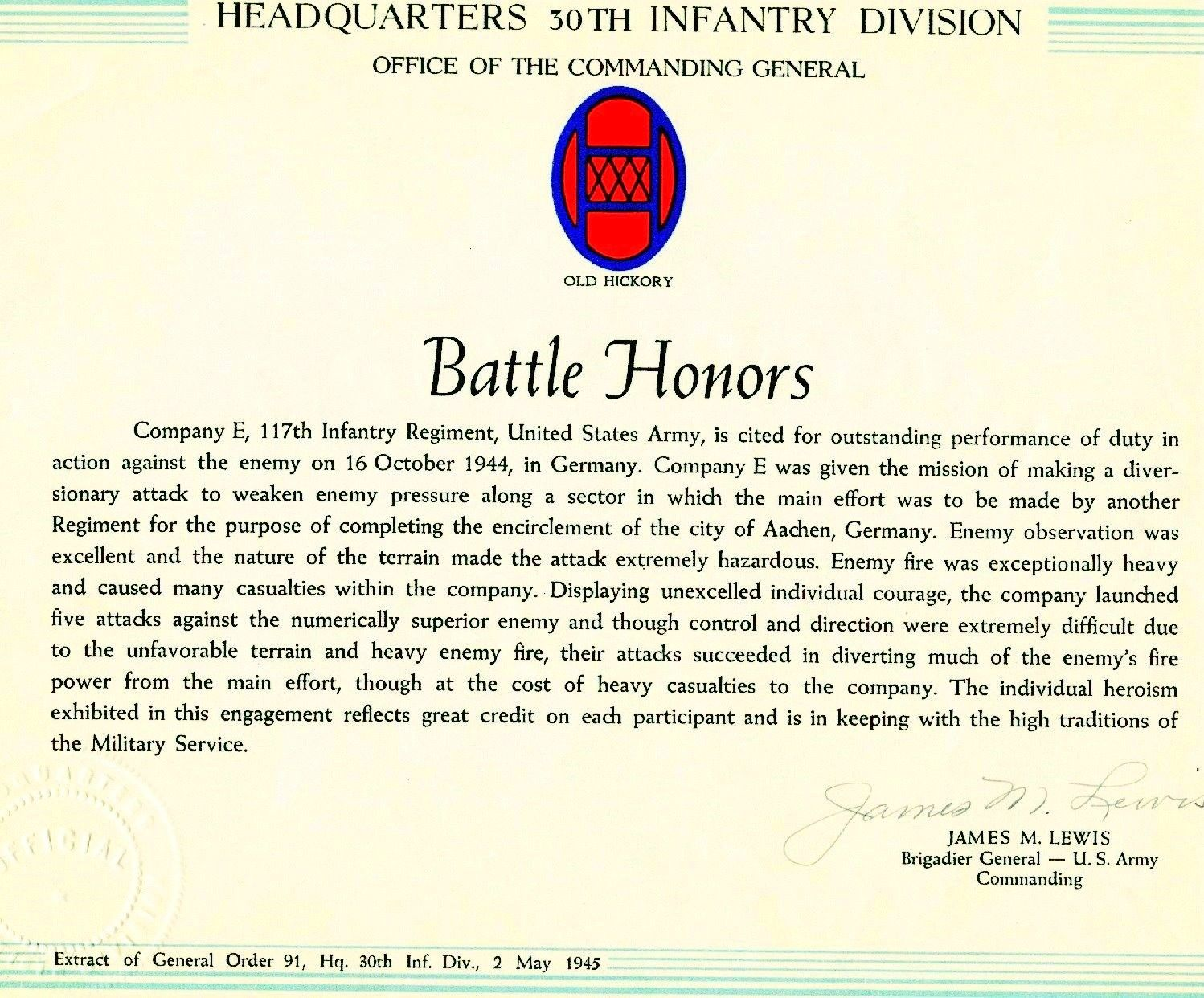
Presidential Unit Citation awarded to E Company, 117th Infantry for its actions at Aachen on 16 October 1944

The 117th Infantry Regiment was assisted by elements of the 2nd Armored Division as it continued with slow progress against the West Wall. The 1st Battalion of the 117th Infantry Regiment was the only lead battalion to crack the West Wall for the entire XIX Corps. The regiment's advance was checked by a strong German counterattack on 9 October 1944 which isolated the 119th Infantry at North Wuerselen. The encirclement of Aachen was completed on 16 October 1944 when the 117th Infantry made contact with the 1st Infantry Division.

On 17 December 1944 the 117th Infantry Regiment was ordered to an assembly area in the vicinity of Hauset in the Belgian Ardennes. En route, the regiment was stopped by an assistant division commander and diverted to Malmedy and Stavelot to block a powerful German counterattack. As the regiment approached Stavelot it was noted that a German Panzer unit already occupied the town. Elements of the 117th Infantry were ordered to retake Stavelot, a key crossroads on the Amblève River. As they moved to their objectives, Axis Sally was on the radio that morning boasting of a huge counterattack though the Ardennes, which she said, could not possibly be stopped. She said "The fanatical 30th Division, Roosevelt’s SS Troops, are en route to the rescue, but this time they will be completely annihilated!" As the regiment approached the town of Stavelot, huge Tiger Royal (Mark VIb) tanks, and assault riflemen were observed in the center of town. The 1st Battalion of the regiment attacked and established a defensive position in the Town Square. The 1st Battalion was reinforced with tank destroyers, machineguns, and mortars. Late in the day, two American jeeps, and two half-ton trucks roared into Stavelot loaded with Germans dressed in American uniforms with guns blazing. The Tennesseans from the 117th quickly annihilated all the Germans captured and seized the jeeps and trucks.

It was determined that the Germans had occupied Stavelot with the 1st SS Adolf Hitler Division. This was the second time the 1st SS Adolf Hitler Division faced the 117th Infantry Regiment and the 30th Infantry Division during the Ardennes Offensive in the winter of 1944–45. The 1st SS Adolf Hitler Division, the main effort of the 1st SS Corps and the spearhead of the Sixth Panzer Army, gave up on their attempt to recapture Stavelot after the 117th Infantry Regiment repulsed six fanatical German assaults on 20 December 1944. Stavelot, like Mortain, was the key to the Sixth Panzer Army's attack in the Ardennes. It was estimated that at least 1000 German dead lined the bank of the Amblève River which was mute testimony to the heroic actions of the 1st battalion, 117th Infantry Regiment. Again the 117th Infantry Regiment had defeated the elite 1st SS Adolf Hitler Division, which was never again to do battle.

The 117th Infantry Regiment moved into Germany and arrived in Varlautenheide, Germany at 2:00 am, 3 February 1945. On 19 February 1945 Major General Leland Hobbs, CG 30th Infantry Division, for the Saint-Barthelemy (Mortain) Performance awarded the Presidential Unit Citation the regiment for actions in France at Saint-Barthelemy. They were also awarded the Belgian Fourragere for its performance in the Ardennes and for the regiment's part in the liberation of Belgium 4–10 September 1944.

On 23 February 1945 the 117th Infantry Regiment crossed the Roer River and continued to move into the heart of Germany. On 27 February 1945 elements of the 83d Infantry Division and the 2nd Armored Division passed through the regiment to exploit the Roer River breakthrough. The regiment spearheaded the Ninth Army's crossing of the Rhine River at 02:00 hrs on 24 March 1945. They drove west into Stockum, Germany, then crossed the Autobahn and went on to Hunxe, Germany. They captured a German Airfield here on 27 March 1945. On 31 March 1945, the 117th Infantry Regiment captured the Lippe Canal, then motored 55 miles (89 km) to Brensteinfurt, Germany. Here they encountered a mass German surrender with German soldiers, hands up and running towards POW cages in the rear. Here they met the first of the streams of Allied prisoners, thin as skeletons, liberated from German prison camps along with laborers from Poland, Czechoslovakia, the Soviet Union, and France.

During the month of April 1945, the regiment continued its dash to towards the east. At 06:00 on 7 April 1945 the 117th Infantry Regiment attacked and took the town of Hamelin, Germany. Hamelin is famous for the Brothers Grimm story of "The Pied Piper of Hamelin" a children's fairy tale. Here the regiment captured hundreds of German soldiers as prisoners of war.

On 17 April 1945 the regiment seized the city of Magdeburg on the Elbe River. The regiment moved east on the morning of 18 April 1945 and by noon had closed on the Elbe River where they were ordered to set up a defense and wait for the Red Army. The regiment waited for three weeks on the Russians and the end of the war. On 27 May 1945 British troops occupied Magdeburg and the 117th Infantry moved 150 miles (240 km) south to Oelsnitz and Bad Elster, Germany near the Czechoslovak border for occupation. Plans were to transfer the regiment and the 30th Infantry Division to the Pacific Theater to fight the Japanese.

On 13 August 1945 the regiment boarded the Liberty Ship Marine Wolfe and sailed to Southampton, England. Before departing Southampton, news of the Japanese surrender canceled to the plans to move the regiment to the Pacific. On 17 August 1945 the regiment sailed on board the RMS Queen Mary from the Ocean Pier at Southampton. They arrived at Pier 90 in New York City, the port of debarkation on 21 August 1945. The 117th Infantry Regiment moved to Fort Jackson on 21 August 1945, and was inactivated there from 17–24 November 1945.

=== Cold War ===
Enhanced Forward Presence Battle Group "Poland" conducts Live Fire Exercise with Bradley Fighting Vehicles as cover and transport. As Infantry dismounts advanced on enemy troops, the Mortar Platoon supported operations with indirect fire. Combined live fire exercises enable multiple elements to be trained simultaneously and show the strengths and capabilities of 278th Armored Cavalry Regiment at Bemowo Piskie Training Area, Poland 25 July 2019.

In a letter to the 30th Division commander in May 1946, the Supreme Allied Headquarters Army Historian Colonel S.L.A. Marshall called the 30th Infantry Division the "Finest Infantry Division in the European Theater of Operations". Marshall wrote, "It is the combined judgments of the approximately 35 historical officers who had worked on the records and in the field that the 30th merited this distinction. It was our finding that the 30th had been outstanding in three operations and we could consistently recommend it for citation on any of these occasions. It was further found that it had in no single instance performed discreditably or weakly ... and in no single operation had it carried less than its share of the burden or looked bad when compared to the forces on its flanks. We were especially impressed with the fact that it consistently achieved results without undue wastage of its men."

On 31 July 1946, the 117th was reorganized. The 1st Battalion at Cleveland was withdrawn, expanded, and re-designated as the 278th Armored Infantry Battalion. The 2nd Battalion at Kingsport was withdrawn, converted, and re-designated as the 168th Military Police Battalion. New 1st and 2nd Battalions were constituted in West Tennessee. The 278th Armored Infantry Battalion was federally recognized on 1 September 1947 in eastern Tennessee with headquarters at Cleveland, continuing the lineage of the 117th Infantry Regiment. On 18 March 1947, the 278th Battalion was expanded to become the 278th Regimental Combat Team (RCT) with headquarters in Athens.

==== Korean War ====
On 1 September 1950, during the Korean War, the 278th RCT was ordered into active federal service at home stations and moved to Fort Devens, Massachusetts. Individual soldiers from the 278th RCT were sent to 8th US Army in Korea as replacements. The 1st Battalion remained in Fort Devens as a training battalion, while the 2nd Battalion was sent to Iceland for garrison duty. The RCT was released from federal service on 8 September 1954 after the end of the war and reverted to state control.

==== Reorganization and consolidation ====
On 27 October 1954, federal recognition was withdrawn from the 278th Infantry RCT and it was broken up, its units becoming part of the 30th Armored Division. Headquarters and 1st Battalion became the 278th Armored Infantry Battalion at Athens, 2nd Battalion became the 330th Antiaircraft Battalion at Kingsport, and the 3rd Battalion became the 190th Armored Infantry Battalion. The 117th Infantry was also broken up, with headquarters and 1st Battalion becoming the 170th Armored Infantry Battalion at Henderson, the 2nd Battalion becoming the 174th Tank Battalion at Murfreesboro, and the 3rd Battalion becoming the 117th Armored Infantry Battalion at Dyersburg.

On 1 March 1959, the 117th and 170th Armored Infantry Battalions consolidated with the 278th Armored Infantry Battalion, 330th Antiaircraft Artillery Battalion and 176th Tank Battalion and were reorganized and redesignated as the 117th Infantry Regiment, a parent regiment under the Combat Arms Regimental System (CARS). The new 117th consisted of the 1st, 2nd, 3rd, and 4th Battalions, all part of the 30th Armored Division. The 117th was reorganized to consist of the 2nd, 3rd, and 4th Battalions on 1 November 1973, with the 2nd and 3rd Battalions becoming part of the 278th Infantry Brigade and the 4th Battalion joining the 30th Armored Brigade. On the same day, the 278th Infantry Brigade was made a Separate Infantry Brigade, just before the 30th Armored Division was inactivated.

On 29 April 1977, the 278th (Separate) Infantry Brigade was reorganized and re-designated the 278th Armored Cavalry Regiment, a separate corps maneuver Unit. Colonel Russell A. Newman was appointed as its first commander. The regimental motto, "I Volunteer Sir", was inspired by the volunteer units of east Tennessee in the Mexican–American War. The regiment's headquarters and headquarters troop (HHT) was redesignated on 1 May from the headquarters and headquarters company (HHC) of the 278th Brigade. The 1st and 2nd Squadrons were redesignated from existing units on the same day. The 2nd Battalion, 117th's HHC was redesignated as the HHT of the 278th ACR's 1st Squadron at Athens. 1st Squadron was mostly redesignated from the 2nd Battalion. The 1st Squadron's Troop A was redesignated from Company B at Cleveland, Troop B from the Support Company at Sweetwater, Detachment 1 of Troop B from Company C at Lenoir City, Troop C from the 376th Signal Company at Newport, Company D from Detachment 1 of the 130th Military Police Company at Oak Ridge, and the Howitzer Battery from Company A at Maryville.

The headquarters and headquarters detachment of the 330th Transportation Battalion at Kingsport was redesignated as the HHT of the 2nd Squadron. Troop E was redesignated from the 1130th Transportation Company at Morristown, Troop F from the 1174th Transportation Company at Bristol, Troop G from Detachment 1 of the 376th Signal Company at Greeneville, Company H from the 130th Military Police Company at Clinton, and the Howitzer Battery from Detachment 1 of the 117th's 2nd Battalion at Knoxville. On 30 September 1978, the 777th Maintenance Company (GS), a separate unit stationed in Knoxville at the Knoxville Armory, was reorganized and redesignated as the Air Troop of the 278th. The unit was later relocated to Alcoa. A year later, the 450th Assault Helicopter Company, stationed in Smyrna, was reorganized and redesignated as the Attack Helicopter Troop of the regiment. The headquarters and headquarters detachment of the 130th Aviation Battalion and the 1155th Transportation Company (Aviation Intermediate Maintenance) were attached to the 278th by the State Area Command to serve as command and control for the separate air troop and attack helicopter troop.

On 1 February 1980, the HHC of the 3rd Battalion, 117th at Cookeville was redesignated as the HHT of the 278th ACR's 3rd Squadron. 3rd Squadron was mostly redesignated from the 117th's 3rd Battalion. Troop I was redesignated from Company A at McMinnville, Detachment 1 of Troop I from Detachment 1 of Company A at Smithville, Troop K from the Support Company at Livingston, Detachment 1 of Troop K from Detachment 1 of Company B at Jamestown, Troop L from Detachment 1 of the Support Company at Crossville, Detachment 1 of Troop L from Detachment 1 of Company C at Harriman, Company M from Company C at Rockwood, and the Howitzer Battery from Company B at Sparta. The 1174th Medium Truck Company (Separate) was reorganized and redesignated as the regiment's 190th Engineer Company on 1 October at Pulaski. Detachment 1 was located at Waynesboro. On 17 October 1986, the 278th's aviation units were consolidated into a new 4th Squadron, the regiment's aviation squadron.

While the 278th Military Intelligence (MI) Company in the ARNG is currently the MI organization for the 278th ACR, that was not always the case. From 1987 until 1997, the 278th's MI unit was the 302nd MI Company, U.S. Army Reserve (USAR), stationed in Memphis, TN. The MI organization for the 278th converted from the USAR to the ARNG as part of the realignment of combat, combat service, and combat service support units between the Army's two Reserve Components that began in 1995.

The 302d MI Company was organized with a major (MAJ) as the company commander, and was authorized 156 soldiers. In addition to the company headquarters element, the 302nd had a technical control and analysis element (TCAE), two collection and jamming (C&J) platoons, one ground surveillance (radar) (GSR) platoon, one counterintelligence (CI)/human intelligence (HUMINT) platoon, one communications platoon, and support personnel, including food service, motor maintenance, and communications/electronics repair.

=== Operation Iraqi Freedom III ===
The 278th ACR (278th RCT) deployed in support of Operation Iraqi Freedom III (2004–2005) from late November 2004 until November 2005 under the command of COL Dennis Adams. The 278th mobilized out of Camp Shelby, MS beginning in June 2004 with roughly 5800 members. Its major attachments were the 1/128th Infantry (the "Eagle Battalion"), Wisconsin National Guard, and the 386th Engineers from the Texas National Guard.

While conducting mobilization training at Camp Shelby, the three armored cavalry troops of each squadron were equipped with nine M1A1 Abrams main battle tanks, 13 M3A2 Bradley fighting vehicles, and two 120 mm mortar carriers. The howitzer battery had eight M109A6 howitzers and four Bradleys for the fire support teams while the tank company had 14 more M1A1s. Each armored cavalry squadron also had two additional M1A1s for the squadron commanders and their operations officers (S-3).

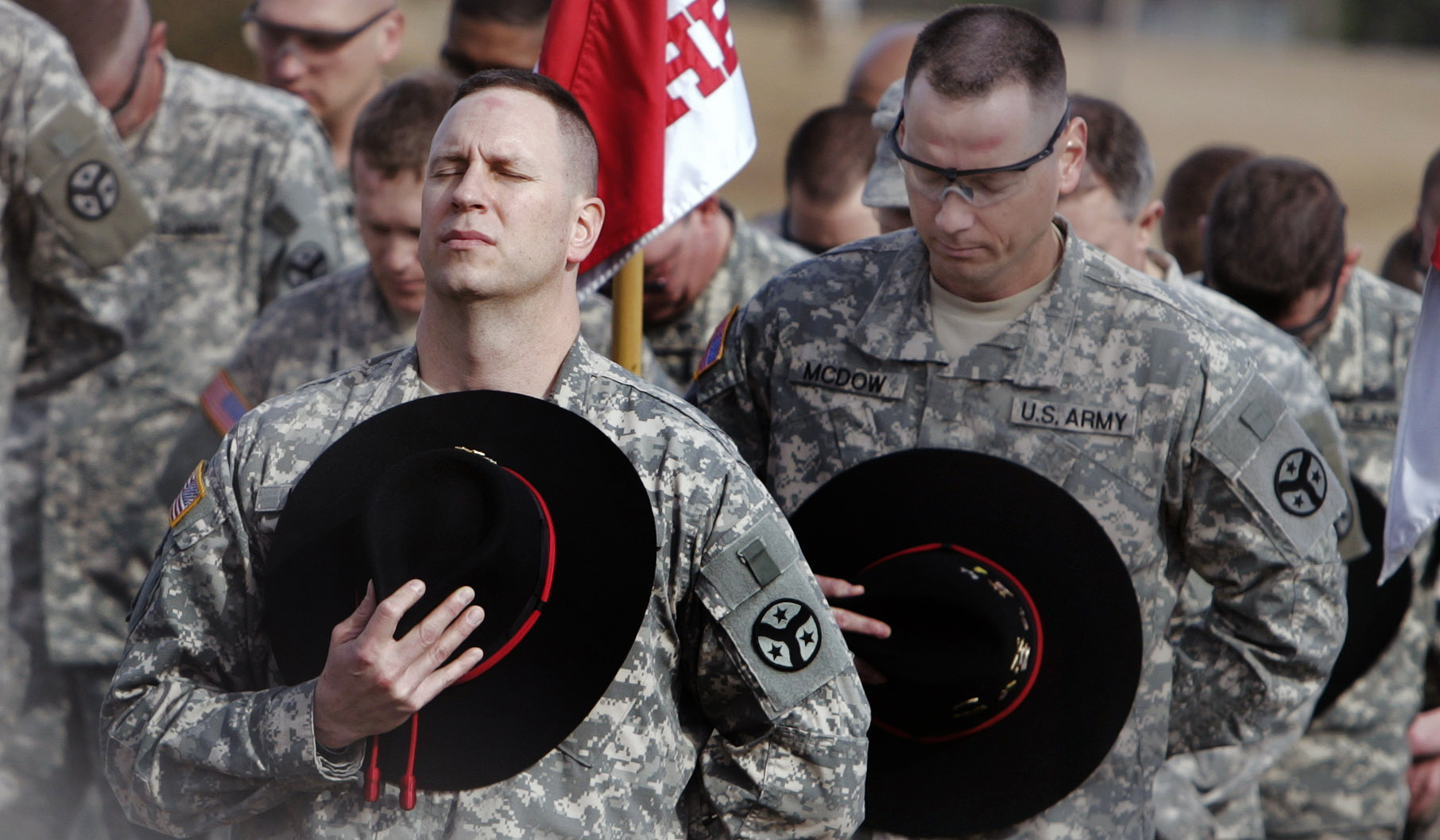
278th soldiers at memorial service for comrades killed in Iraq.

The 278th RCT took over from the 30th BCT, North Carolina, commanded by BG Danny Hickman on Christmas Eve 2004 at FOB Caldwell where the regimental headquarters was established. Initially the 278th RCT fell under Task Force Danger and the 1st Infantry Division. In February 2005 the 278th became part of Task Force Liberty commanded by the 42nd Infantry Division. The 1/278th and the 386th Engineer Battalion were located at FOB Caldwell along with the regimental HQ. The regiment operated along the Iranian border in the Diyala Province and in the center of an ethnic triangle formed by Arabs, Kurds and Turkomen in the Salah Ah Din Province. Each squadron was assigned to a FOB (forward operating base) and detachments sent to other locations, with some performing convoy escort missions from Kuwait to Mosul. The 101st Airborne Division (AASLT) replaced the 278th RCT upon the 278th's redeployment to the United States.

FOB assignments:

FOB Caldwell (Balad Ruz- Kirkush Military Training Base): RHHT, Regimental Reconnaissance Troop (RRT), SPT/278th ACR,1/278th ACR and attachments.

FOB Cobra (Jalula, Iraq): 3/278th ACR and attachments, B Co 1/128 Infantry and soldiers from C Co 386th Engineer Battalion.

FOB Bernstein (Tuz Khurmatu, Iraq): 2/278th ACR and attachments. During their deployment to FOB Bernstein and AO Peacemaker in 2004–05 members of the medical platoon, 2/278th ACR were awarded six Army Commendation Medals with Device for Valor, one Bronze Star with Device for Valor and two Purple Hearts for actions they were involved in.

FOB McKenzie (Samara East Airbase):3rd Platoon, Lightning Troop 3/278th. Attachments from Pasadena, TX and Wisconsin infantry.

FOB O'Ryan (Near Ad Dujayl, Iraq): D Co 1/278th ACR (attached to 1–128 Infantry Battalion, 32nd Infantry Brigade, Wisconsin ARNG) which was assigned to the 1st Brigade (Raiders), 3rd Infantry Division.

International Zone (Baghdad Iraq): Troop F 2/278th ACR. Attached to 1st Cavalry (3–8 Cavalry) and later under 3rd Infantry Division (4–64 Tuskers) Under the name Task-force Baghdad.

The FOBs included: Black hawk, Prosperity, Union (Trojan Horse). This troop was responsible for security mission that included a mission with the CIA to guard the interim prime minister's house. Other missions included patrolling, providing listening and observation posts (LP/OPs) during elections and for force protection of the International Zone. This unit conducted checkpoints, convoy operations and provided security for the Naval Special Warfare EOD teams as well as Australian bomb squads.

Eight 278th ACR soldiers were killed in action in Iraq in 2005. Two more died of accidents or natural causes.

=== Operation Iraqi Freedom 9-11 ===
The 278th deployed again to Iraq in 2010 in support of Operation Iraqi Freedom 9-11.

The 278th mobilized out of JFTC Shelby (Camp Shelby) beginning in December 2009 with attachments from Michigan, Wisconsin, Tennessee, and West Virginia National Guard units. The 278th acted as the convoy security element for the 13th ESC, and was tasked with the protection of retrograde activities and FOB closures from the Turkish border to Kuwait.

FOB Assignments:

Camp Taji: RHHT/278 ACR, SPT/278 ACR, RTS/278 ACR

COB Speicher: 3/278 ACR

Joint Base Balad: 2/278 ACR

FOB Q-West: 1/278 ACR

FOB Marez/Diamond Back: RFS/278 ACR

FOB Prosperity:

Spc. Robert D. West received a Purple Heart and Combat Action Badge for injuries sustained on 31 May 2010 while assigned to 2nd Platoon RFS/278 ACR on a return mission to Marez/Diamond. After passing through an Iraqi Army checkpoint his vehicle was hit with two IEDs, injuring West. West climbed back into the turret and manned the .50BMG until he and the vehicle's crew were moved to surrounding vehicles. After undergoing medical treatment West returned to his unit and remained in theatre until his unit redeployed to the United States in August 2010 with no fatalities.

Operation Inherent Resolve (2024–2026)

From 2024 to 2026, the 278th Armored Cavalry Regiment deployed two task forces, each serving one-year rotations in support of Operation Inherent Resolve. Mechanized infantry Soldiers from Task Force 1 and Task Force 2 conducted presence patrols throughout northeastern Syria to advise, assist, and enable partner forces in the defeat of the Islamic State (ISIS). The task forces were primarily stationed at Northern Landing Zone (NLZ) and Rumalyn Landing Zone (RLZ). Legion Company of the 3rd Battalion, 278th Armored Cavalry Regiment, assigned to Task Force 2, participated in Operation Hawkeye Strike, a major offensive operation against ISIS conducted in response to the deaths of several U.S. service members near Al-Tanf Garrison.

Operation Epic Fury (2026)

From February to May 2026, Legion Company of the 3rd Squadron, 278th Armored Cavalry Regiment participated in Operation Epic Fury during the U.S. conflict with Iran. The squadron conducted defensive operations throughout the theater, providing security for the commanding general, High Mobility Artillery Rocket System (HIMARS) units, missile storage sites, and Joint Special Operations Command (JSOC) aviation missions. The unit also established and maintained large-scale screen lines as part of a task force defense along the Iraq border and conducted surveillance to monitor hostile unmanned aerial systems (UAS) and insurgent activity. During the deployment, companies assigned to the squadron came under repeated ballistic missile and one-way attack drone strikes while operating at forward locations, supporting U.S. defensive operations against Iranian attacks on coalition forces. Personnel who served during the campaign were awarded combat decorations in recognition of their service under hostile fire

== Organization 2025 ==
- 278th Armored Cavalry Regiment, in Knoxville (redesignated 278th Cavalry Regiment (MBCT) in 2026)
  - Headquarters and Headquarters Troop, 278th Armored Cavalry Regiment, in Knoxville
  - 1st Squadron, 278th Armored Cavalry Regiment, in Henderson (redesignated 1st Infantry Battalion, 278th Cavalry Regiment (MBCT) in 2026)
    - Headquarters and Headquarters Troop, 1st Squadron, 278th Armored Cavalry Regiment, in Henderson
    - Troop A (Tank), 1st Squadron, 278th Armored Cavalry Regiment, in Milan
    - Troop B (Tank), 1st Squadron, 278th Armored Cavalry Regiment, in Ashland City
    - Troop C (Mechanized Infantry), 1st Squadron, 278th Armored Cavalry Regiment, in Clarksville
  - 2nd Squadron, 278th Armored Cavalry Regiment, in Cookeville (redesignated 2nd Infantry Battalion, 278th Cavalry Regiment (MBCT) in 2026)
    - Headquarters and Headquarters Troop, 2nd Squadron, 278th Armored Cavalry Regiment, in Cookeville
      - Detachment 1, Headquarters and Headquarters Troop, 2nd Squadron, 278th Armored Cavalry Regiment, in Gallatin
    - Troop E (Mechanized Infantry), 2nd Squadron, 278th Armored Cavalry Regiment, in Jamestown
      - Detachment 1, Troop E (Mechanized Infantry), 2nd Squadron, 278th Armored Cavalry Regiment, in Livingston
    - Troop F (Mechanized Infantry), 2nd Squadron, 278th Armored Cavalry Regiment, in McMinnville
    - Troop G (Tank), 2nd Squadron, 278th Armored Cavalry Regiment, in Crossville
  - 3rd Squadron, 278th Armored Cavalry Regiment, in Temple (TX) — (Texas Army National Guard) (redesignated 3rd Infantry Battalion, 278th Cavalry Regiment (MBCT) in 2026)
    - Headquarters and Headquarters Troop, 3rd Squadron, 278th Armored Cavalry Regiment, in Temple
    - Troop I (Tank), 3rd Squadron, 278th Armored Cavalry Regiment, at Fort Hood
    - Troop K (Tank), 3rd Squadron, 278th Armored Cavalry Regiment, in Temple
    - Troop L (Mechanized Infantry), 3rd Squadron, 278th Armored Cavalry Regiment, in Temple
  - 4th Squadron, 278th Armored Cavalry Regiment, in Mount Carmel (redesignated 1st Squadron, 109th Cavalry Regiment in 2026)
    - Headquarters and Headquarters Troop, 4th Squadron, 278th Armored Cavalry Regiment, in Mount Carmel
    - Troop N, 4th Squadron, 278th Armored Cavalry Regiment, in Sweetwater
    - Troop O, 4th Squadron, 278th Armored Cavalry Regiment, in Newport
    - Troop P, 4th Squadron, 278th Armored Cavalry Regiment, in Greeneville
    - Troop Q (Tank), 4th Squadron, 278th Armored Cavalry Regiment, in Rockwood
  - Field Artillery Squadron, 278th Armored Cavalry Regiment, in Winchester (redesignated 1st Battalion, 115th Field Artillery Regiment in 2026)
    - Headquarters and Headquarters Battery, Field Artillery Squadron, 278th Armored Cavalry Regiment, in Winchester
    - Battery A, Field Artillery Squadron, 278th Armored Cavalry Regiment, in Maryville
    - Battery B, Field Artillery Squadron, 278th Armored Cavalry Regiment, in Covington
    - Battery C, Field Artillery Squadron, 278th Armored Cavalry Regiment, in Sparta
  - Regimental Engineer Squadron, 278th Armored Cavalry Regiment, in Lebanon
    - Headquarters and Headquarters Troop, Regimental Engineer Squadron, 278th Armored Cavalry Regiment, in Lebanon
    - Troop A (Combat Engineer), Regimental Engineer Squadron, 278th Armored Cavalry Regiment, in Dunlap
      - Detachment 1, Troop A (Combat Engineer), Regimental Engineer Squadron, 278th Armored Cavalry Regiment, in Monteagle
    - Troop B (Engineer Support), Regimental Engineer Squadron, 278th Armored Cavalry Regiment, in Russellville
    - Troop C (Signal), Regimental Engineer Squadron, 278th Armored Cavalry Regiment, in Knoxville
    - Troop D (Military Intelligence), Regimental Engineer Squadron, 278th Armored Cavalry Regiment, in Nashville
      - Detachment 1, Troop D (Military Intelligence), Regimental Engineer Squadron, 278th Armored Cavalry Regiment, at Naval Air Station Patuxent River (MD) (RQ-28A UAV) — (Maryland Army National Guard)
  - Regimental Support Squadron, 278th Armored Cavalry Regiment, in Columbia (redesignated 473rd Light Support Battalion in 2026)
    - Headquarters and Headquarters Troop, Regimental Support Squadron, 278th Armored Cavalry Regiment, in Columbia
    - Troop A (Distribution), Regimental Support Squadron, 278th Armored Cavalry Regiment, in Lobelville
      - Detachment 1, Troop A (Distribution), Regimental Support Squadron, 278th Armored Cavalry Regiment, in New Tazewell
    - Troop B (Maintenance), Regimental Support Squadron, 278th Armored Cavalry Regiment, in Centerville
    - Troop C (Medical), Regimental Support Squadron, 278th Armored Cavalry Regiment, in Louisville
    - Troop D (Forward Support), Regimental Support Squadron, 278th Armored Cavalry Regiment, in Clinton — attached to 4th Squadron
    - Troop E (Forward Support), Regimental Support Squadron, 278th Armored Cavalry Regiment, in Smyrna — attached to Regimental Engineer Squadron
    - Troop F (Forward Support), Regimental Support Squadron, 278th Armored Cavalry Regiment, in Lewisburg — attached to Field Artillery Squadron
    - Troop G (Forward Support), Regimental Support Squadron, 278th Armored Cavalry Regiment, in Humboldt — attached to 1st Squadron
      - Detachment 1, Troop G (Forward Support), Regimental Support Squadron, 278th Armored Cavalry Regiment, in Parsons
    - Troop H (Forward Support), Regimental Support Squadron, 278th Armored Cavalry Regiment, in Temple (TX) — attached to 3rd Squadron (Texas Army National Guard)
    - Troop I (Forward Support), Regimental Support Squadron, 278th Armored Cavalry Regiment, in Lafayette — attached to 2nd Squadron
      - Detachment 1, Troop I (Forward Support), Regimental Support Squadron, 278th Armored Cavalry Regiment, in Gordonsville

== Equipment ==
1st and 3rd Squadrons are armored battalions and have 2 tank companies each and 1 mechanized infantry company each. Each tank company (troop) is equipped with 14 M1A1 SA (situational awareness variant) main battle tanks. Each Infantry company (troop) is equipped with M2A3 Bradley Fighting Vehicle. 2nd squadron is a mechanized infantry battalion and consists of 2 mechanized infantry companies and 1 tank company. The Field Artillery Squadron (FAS) consists of three artillery batteries (fielding M109A6 Paladins), a support troop, and headquarters troop.

== Honors ==
=== Campaign participation credit ===
- WORLD WAR I
1. Offensive
2. Ypres-Lys
3. Flanders 1918
- WORLD WAR II
1. Normandy
2. Northern France
3. Rhineland
4. Ardennes-Alsace
5. Central Europe
6. Guinea
7. Leyte
8. Luzon
9. Ryukyus (with arrowhead)

HHT/2/278 ACR (Cookeville); HQ/SPT/278 ACR (Smyrna); and B(-)/1/278 ACR (Clarksville) each additionally entitled to:

- WORLD WAR II
1. Southern Philippines

=== Decorations ===
1. Presidential Unit Citation (Army), Streamer embroidered ST. BARTHELMY
2. Presidential Unit Citation (Army), Streamer embroidered UBACH
3. Presidential Unit Citation (Army), Streamer embroidered SCHERPENSEEL
4. French Croix de Guerre with Silver Star, World War II, Steamer embroidered SCHERPENSEEL
5. French Croix de Guerre with Palm, World War II, Steamer embroidered FRANCE
6. Belgian Fourragere 1940
7. Cited in the Order of the Day of the Belgian Army for actions in Belgium
8. Cited in the Order of the Day of the Belgian Army for actions in ARDENNES
- A(-)/RFS/278 ACR (Maryville), additionally entitled to:
1. French Croix de Guerre with Palm, World War II, Steamer embroidered MOSELLE RIVER
- HHT/2/278 ACR (Cookeville); HHT/SPT/278 (Smyrna): and B(-)/1/278 ACR (Clarksville) each additionally entitled to:
1. Philippine Presidential Unit Citation, Streamer embroidered 17 OCTOBER 1944 TO 4 JULY 1945

=== Medal of Honor recipients ===
World War I

- James E. Karnes

Rank and organization: Sergeant, Company D, 117th Infantry, 30th Division.
Place and date: Near Estrees, France, 8 October 1918.
Citation: During an advance, his company was held up by a machinegun, which was enfilading the line. Accompanied by another soldier, he advanced against this position and succeeded in reducing the nest by killing 3 and capturing 7 of the enemy and their guns.

- Edward R. Talley

Rank and organization: Sergeant, Company L, 117th Infantry, 30th Division.
Place and date: Near Ponchaux, France, 7 October 1918.
Citation: Undeterred by seeing several comrades killed in attempting to put a hostile machinegun nest out of action, Sgt. Talley attacked the position single-handed. Armed only with a rifle, he rushed the nest in the face of intense enemy fire, killed or wounded at least 6 of the crew, and silenced the gun. When the enemy attempted to bring forward another gun and ammunition he drove them back by effective fire from his rifle.

- Calvin John Ward

Rank and organization: Private, Company D, 117th Infantry, 30th Division.
Place and date: Near Estrees, France, 8 October 1918.
Citation: During an advance, Pvt. Ward's company was held up by a machinegun, which was enfilading the line. Accompanied by a noncommissioned officer, he advanced against this post and succeeded in reducing the nest by killing 3 and capturing 7 of the enemy and their guns.

World War II

- Harold G. Kiner

Rank and organization: Private, Company F, 117th Infantry, 30th Infantry Division.
Place and date: Near Palenberg, Germany, 2 October 1944.
Citation: With 4 other men, he was leading in a frontal assault 2 October 1944, on a Siegfried Line pillbox near Palenberg, Germany. Machinegun fire from the strongly defended enemy position 25 yards (23 m) away pinned down the attackers. The Germans threw hand grenades, one of which dropped between Pvt. Kiner and 2 other men. With no hesitation, Private Kiner hurled himself upon the grenade, smothering the explosion. By his gallant action and voluntary sacrifice of his own life, he saved his 2 comrades from serious injury or death.

== Gallery ==
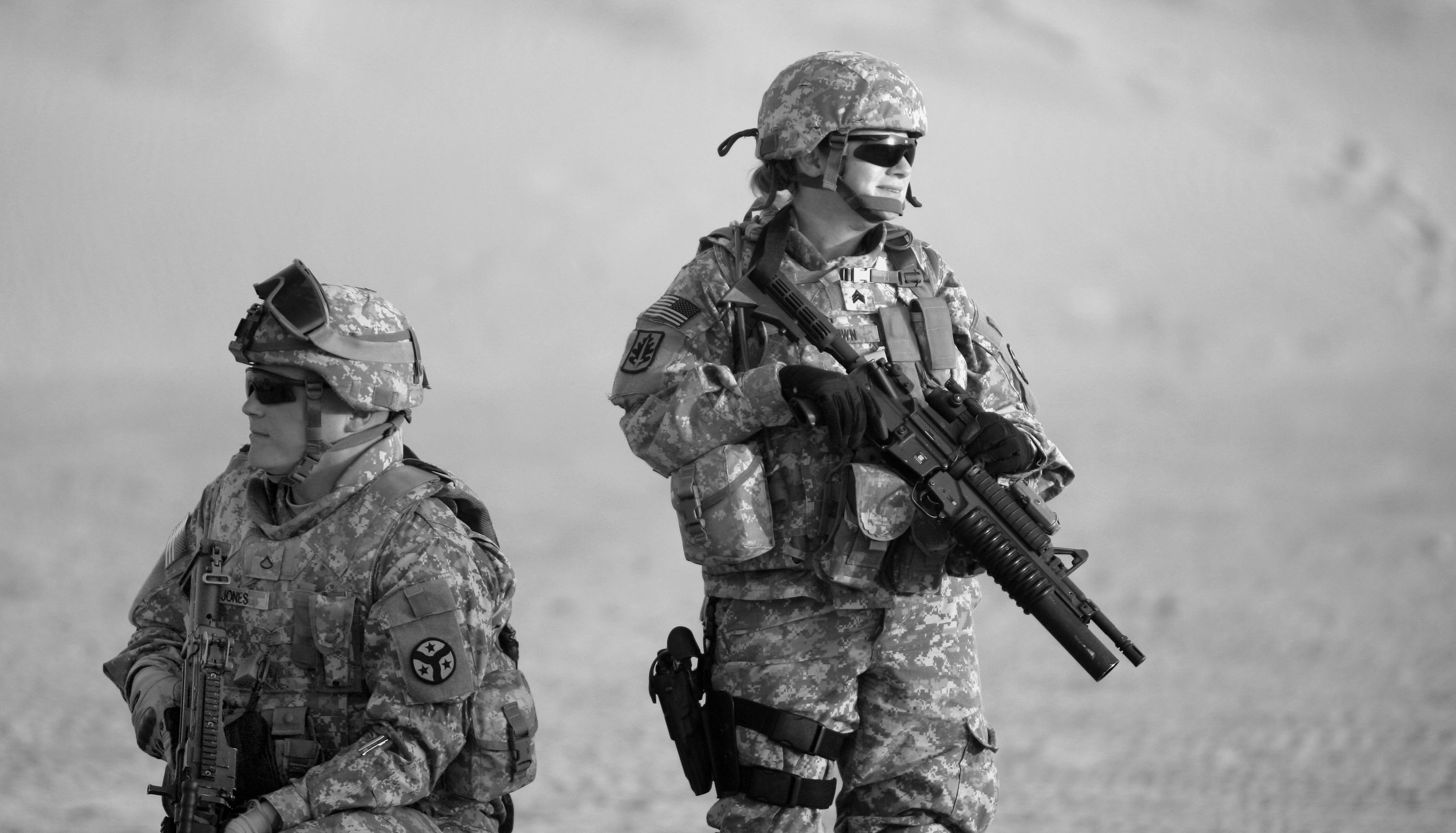
Soldiers assigned to 1st Platoon, Regimental Troops Squadron, 278th ACR.

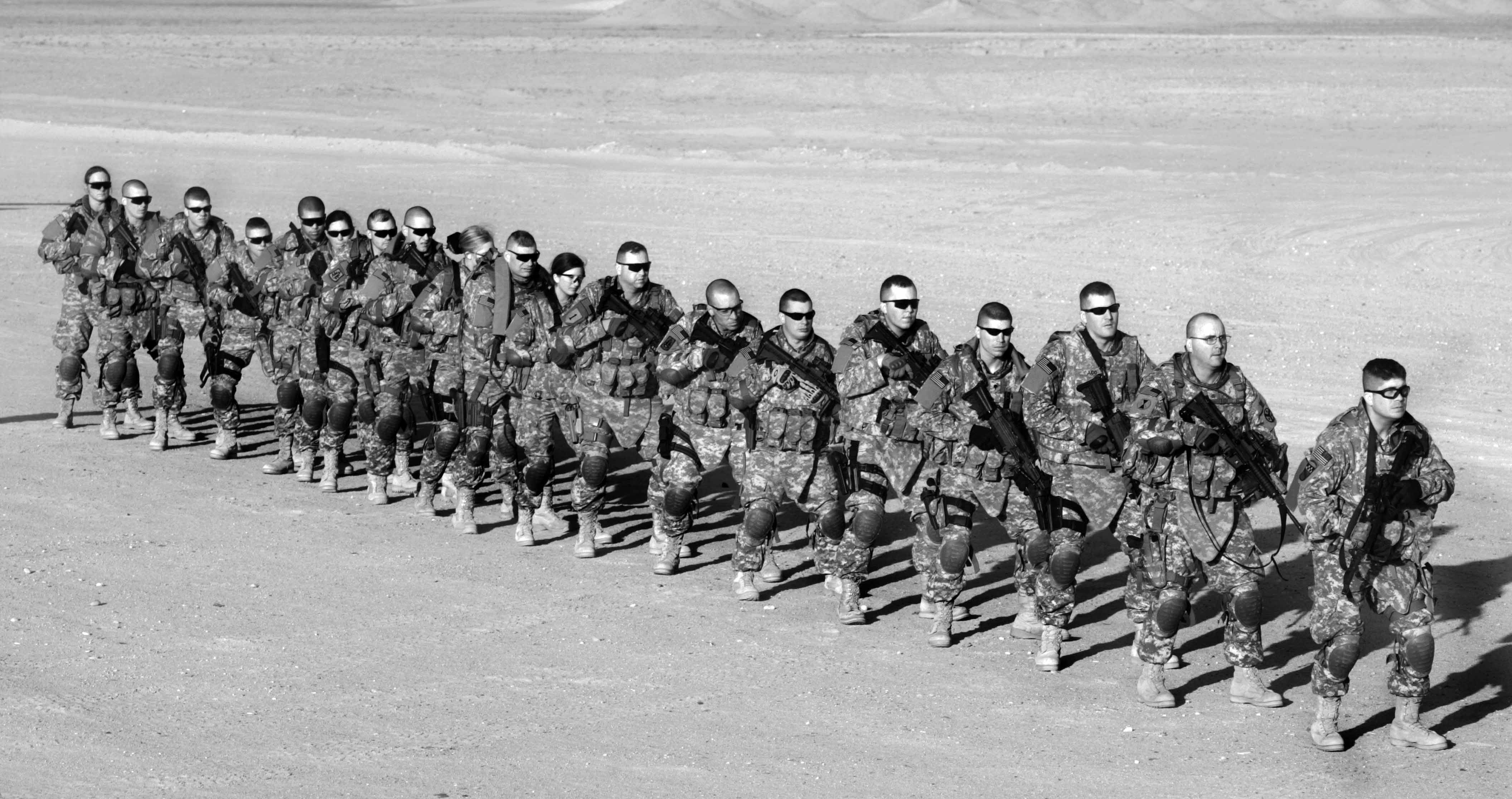
Live fire training at Camp Buehring, Kuwait, prior to deploying to Iraq.

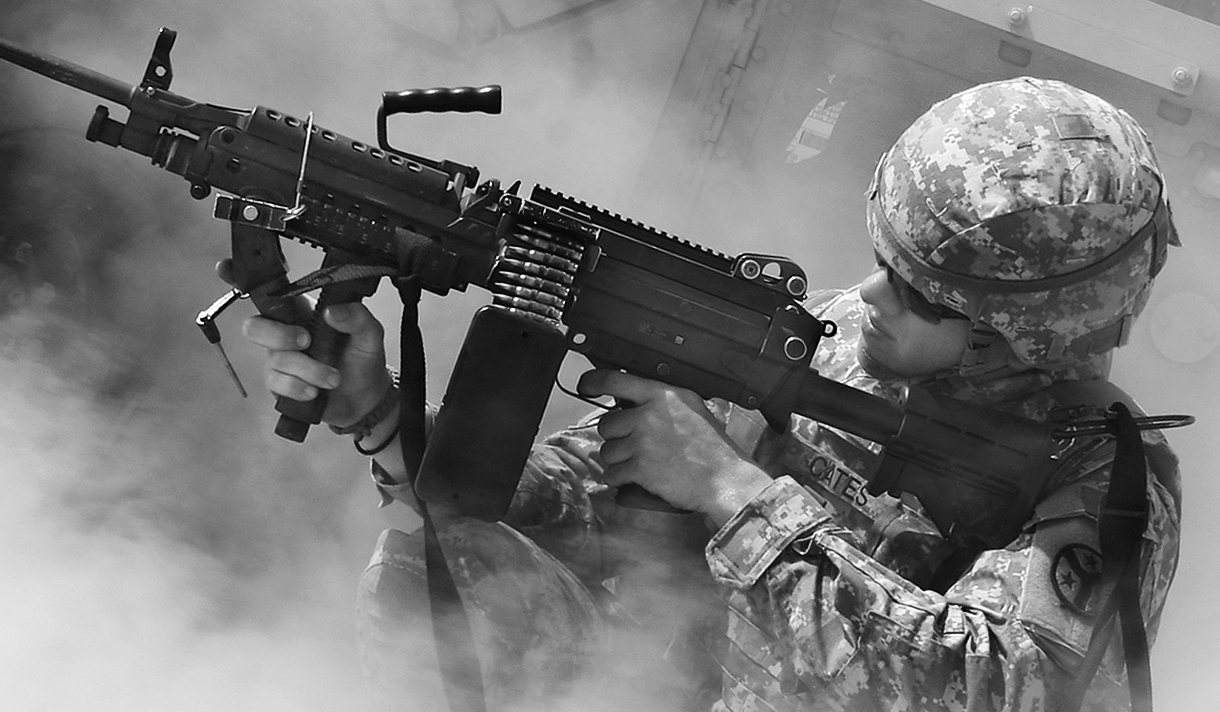
Training mounted and dismounted firing techniques.

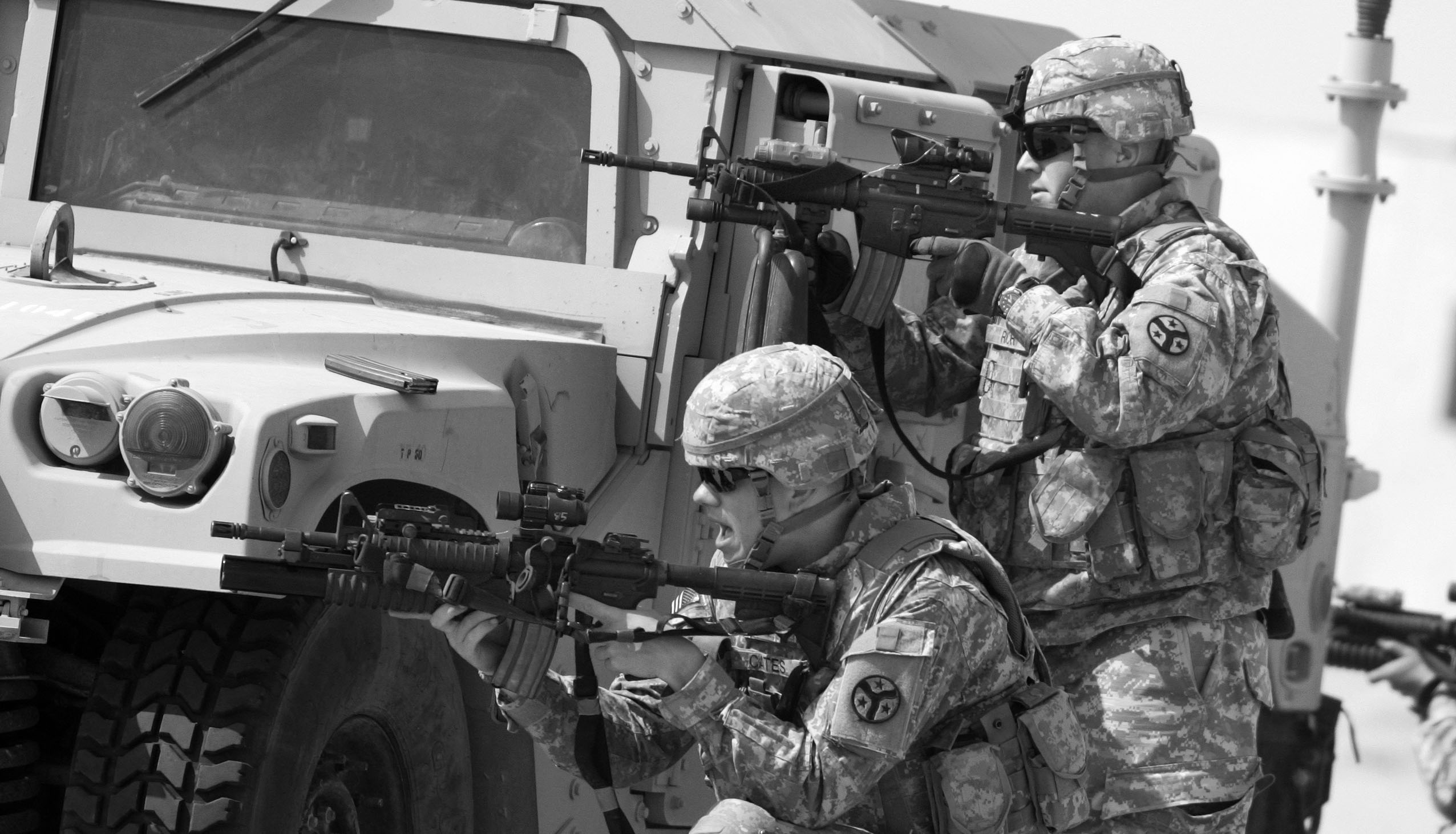
Soldiers take cover behind a HMMWV during live fire training.

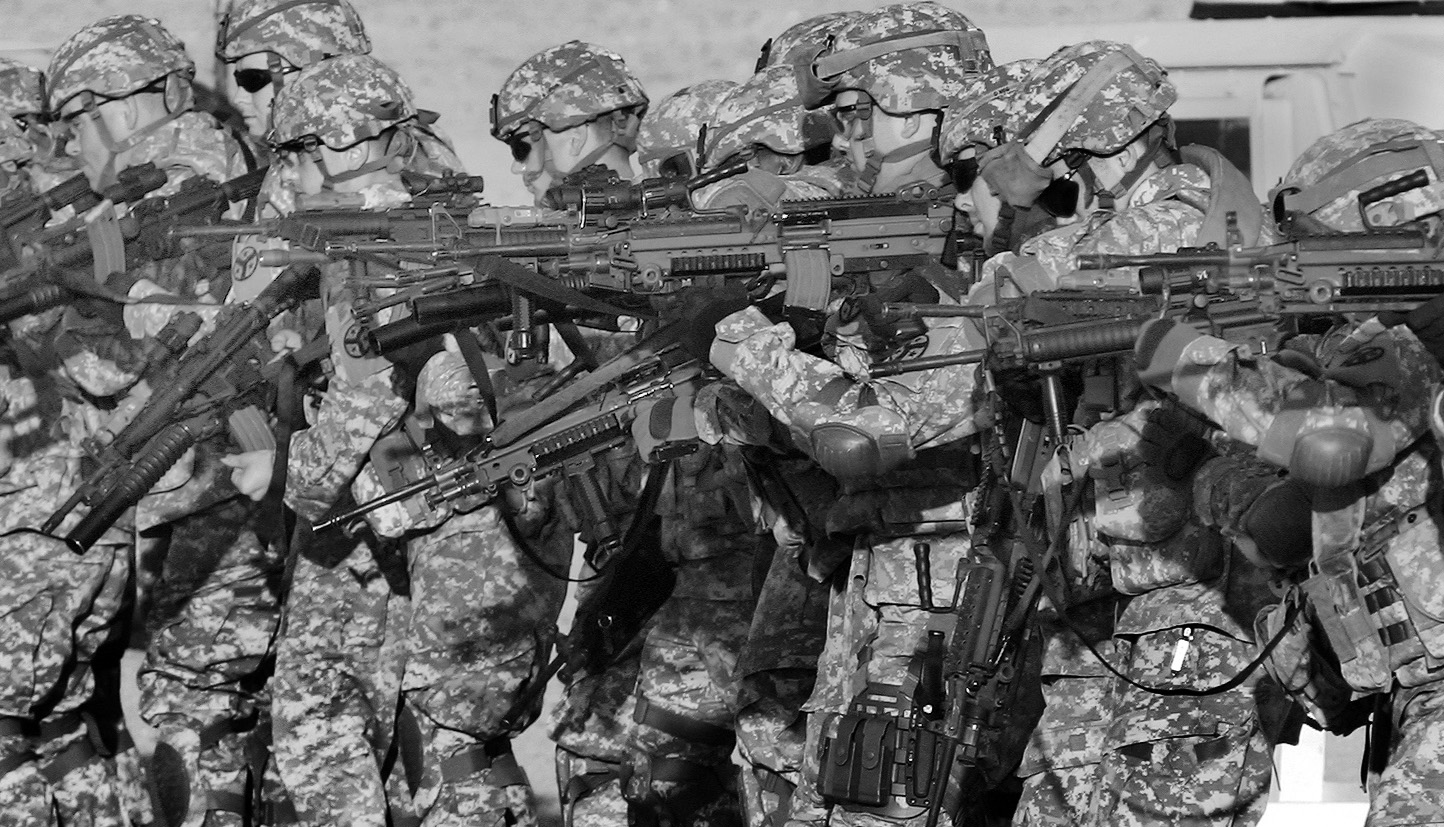
Soldiers test fire their weapons prior to entering Iraq.
