= 117th Regiment =

117th Regiment may refer to:

- 117th Regiment of Foot (disambiguation), British Army regiments
- 117th Field Artillery Regiment
- 117th Light Anti-Aircraft Regiment, Royal Artillery
- 117th Heavy Anti-Aircraft Regiment, Royal Artillery
- 117th (7th London) Field Regiment, Royal Artillery
- 117th Fighter Aviation Regiment

== American Civil War regiments ==
- 117th Illinois Infantry Regiment
- 117th Indiana Infantry Regiment
- 117th New York Infantry Regiment
- 117th Ohio Infantry Regiment

== See also ==
- 117th Brigade (disambiguation)
- 117th Division (disambiguation)
