= Public Lab =

American nonprofit organization

The Public Laboratory for Open Technology and Science
- Abbreviation: Public Lab
- Formation: 2010; 16 years ago
- Type: Non-profit organization
- Registration no.: 45-2846555
- Purpose: Community Science Environmental Justice
- Executive Director: Jordan Macha
- Board of directors: Janet Haven (Chair), Shelby Ward (Vice Chair), Micah L. Sifry (Secretary), Catherine Bracy, Elaine Garvey, Mike Ma, Gwen Ottinger, Rajul (Raj) Pandya, Christina Xu,
- Website: publiclab.org

The Public Laboratory for Open Technology and Science (Public Lab) is a non-profit organization that facilitates collaborative, open source environmental research in a model known as Community Science. It supports communities facing environmental justice issues in a do it yourself approach to environmental monitoring and advocacy. Public Lab grew out of a grassroots effort to take aerial photographs of the BP Oil Spill in the Gulf of Mexico in 2010. Since then, they have launched a range of projects, including an open source spectrometer, multi-spectral camera, and low-cost microscope.

== Balloon Mapping ==
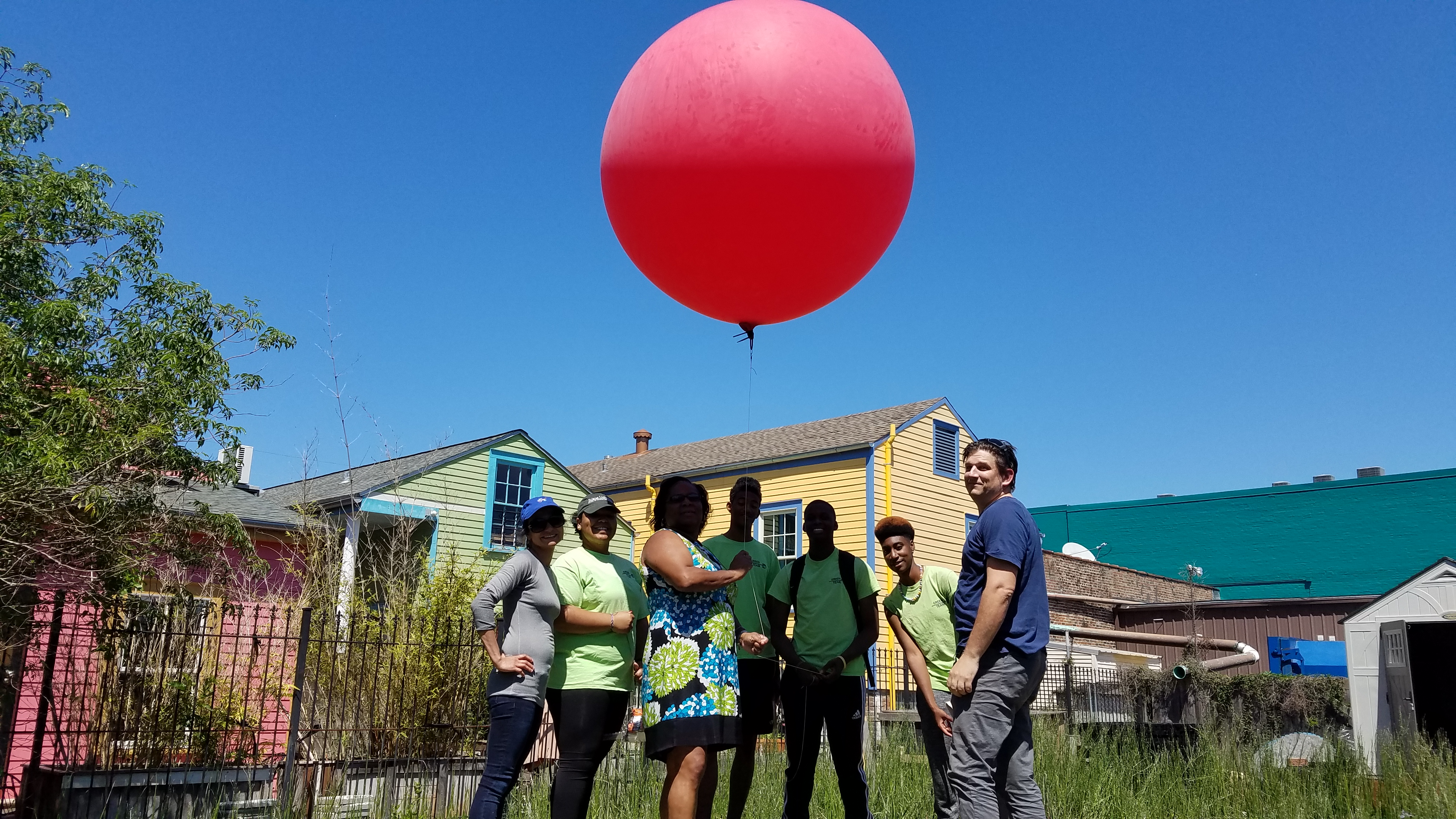
A group in New Orleans works with Public Lab to launch a balloon mapping kit in 2017.

The aerial photography technique Public Lab is best known for involves lifting cameras above an area using tethered helium-filled weather balloons.

== Open source environmental monitoring ==
Public Lab's community develops open source hardware, software, and other open methodologies to democratize environmental monitoring. Recognizing that cost, complexity, and lack of access can prevent communities from playing an active role in documenting environmental problems, the community publishes plans and guides for Do It Yourself monitoring projects that can be made at home.
