= Calvin John Ward =

United States Army Medal of Honor recipient (1899–1967)

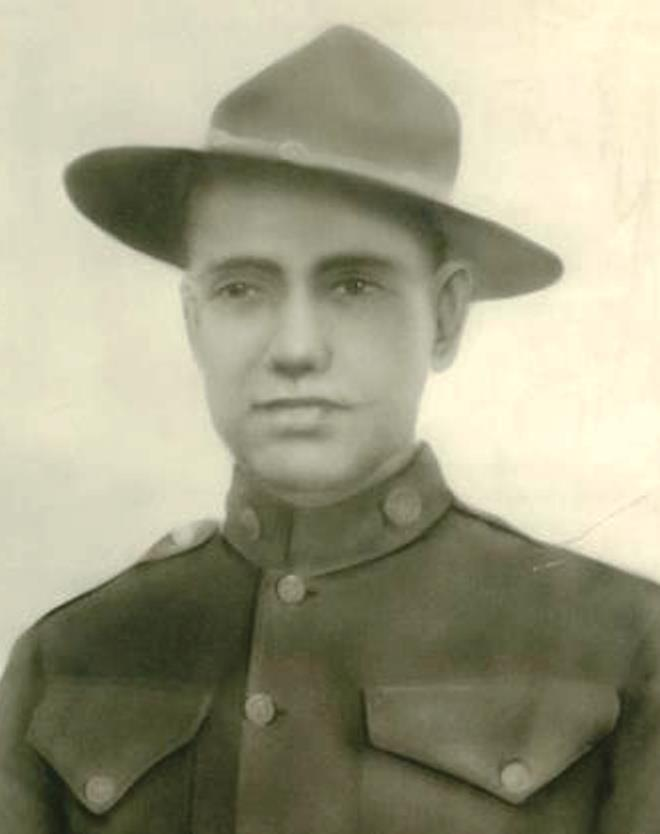
- Born: October 30, 1899; Greene County, Tennessee, U.S.
- Died: December 15, 1967 (aged 68); Morristown, Tennessee, U.S.
- Burial place: Glenwood Cemetery, Bristol, Tennessee
- Military career
- Allegiance: United States
- Branch: United States Army
- Rank: Private First Class
- Service number: 1307698
- Unit: U.S. 117th Infantry Regiment
- Conflicts: World War I: Meuse-Argonne Offensive
- Awards: Medal of Honor; British Distinguished Conduct Medal; French Croix de Guerre w/ Palm; French Medaille Militaire; Montenegrin Medaille de Bravoure; Portuguese War Cross 3rd Class; Italian Croce di Guerra; Belgian Decoration; Russian Decoration

Calvin John Ward (October 30, 1899 – December 15, 1967), was a soldier in the United States Army National Guard who was awarded the Medal of Honor for his actions during World War I.

== Biography ==
Calvin John Ward was born on October 30, 1899, in Greene County, Tennessee and lived in Morristown, Tennessee. Ward entered active duty with the United States Army's 117th Regiment from the Tennessee National Guard during World War I. On October 8, 1918, during the Meuse-Argonne Offensive, Ward's company was stopped near Estrées, France by a German machine gun position. Ward and Sergeant James Ernest Karnes, deciding they had "had all they could take" of this situation, fixed bayonets, charged and captured the position. This freed their company to advance against German lines in the last major offensive of the war. Both men received the Medal of Honor for extraordinary heroism in this action.

Calvin Ward died on December 15, 1967, and is buried in Glenwood Cemetery, Bristol, Sullivan County, Tennessee.

== Medals ==
Military records from the United States, United Kingdom, France, Italy, and Portugal attribute the following medals to Calvin John Ward:

Medal of Honor, British Distinguished Conduct Medal 31JAN1919, French Croix de Guerre w/ Palm 13APR1919, French Medaille Militaire 5MAY1919, Montenegrin Medaille de Bravoure w/ Palm 25JUN1919, Portuguese Cruz de Gurra 3rd Class 6DEC1921, Italian Croce di Guerra 9DEC1921, Belgian Decoration, Russian Decoration

== Medal of Honor Citation ==
Rank and organization: Private, U.S. Army, Company D, 117th Infantry, 30th Division. Place and date: At Estrees, France; October 8, 1918. Entered service at: Morristown, Tennessee. Born: October 30, 1898; Greene County, Tennessee. General Orders: War Department, General Orders No. 16 (January 22, 1919).

Citation:

During an advance, Pvt. Ward's company was held up by a machinegun, which was enfilading the line. Accompanied by a noncommissioned officer, he advanced against this post and succeeded in reducing the nest by killing three and capturing seven of the enemy and their guns.

== Military Awards ==
Ward's military decorations and awards include:

1st row	Medal of Honor		
2nd row	Silver Star	Purple Heart w/one bronze oak leaf cluster	World War I Victory Medal w/three bronze service stars to denote credit for the Somme Offensive, Ypres-Lys and Defensive Sector battle clasps.
3rd row	Distinguished Conduct Medal (Great Britain)	Médaille militaire (French Republic)	Croix de guerre 1914–1918 w/bronze palm (French Republic)
4th row	Croce al Merito di Guerra (Italy)	Medal for Military Bravery (Kingdom of Montenegro)	Medalha da Cruz de Guerra, Third Class (Portuguese Republic)

== See also ==
- List of Medal of Honor recipients for World War I
