= James Ernest Karnes =

United States Army Medal of Honor recipient (1889–1966)

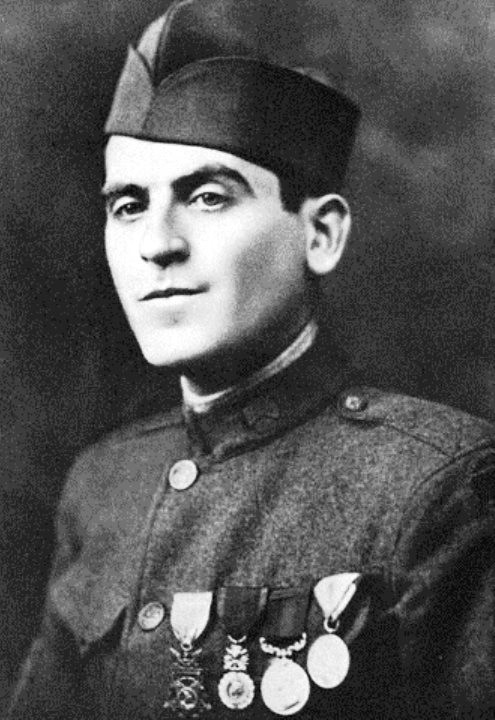
- Medal of Honor recipient
- Born: July 20, 1889; Arlington, Tennessee, U.S.
- Died: July 8, 1966 (aged 76)
- Military career
- Allegiance: United States
- Branch: United States Army
- Rank: Sergeant
- Service number: 1307595
- Unit: U.S. 117th Infantry Regiment
- Conflicts: World War I
- Awards: Medal of Honor; Silver Star

James Ernest "Buck" Karnes was a Sergeant in the United States Army who received the Medal of Honor for his actions near Estrees, France, on October 8, 1918, during World War I.

== Biography ==
James Ernest "Buck" Karnes (July 20, 1889–July 8, 1966), was born in Arlington, Tennessee and grew up in Knoxville, Tennessee. Karnes entered active duty with the United States Army's 117th Regiment from the Tennessee National Guard during World War I. On October 8, 1918 Karnes' company was stopped near Estrées, France, by a German machine gun position. Karnes and Private Calvin John Ward, deciding they had "had all they could take" of this situation, fixed bayonets, charged and captured the position. This freed their company to advance against German lines in the last major offensive of the war. Both men received the Medal of Honor for extraordinary heroism in this action.

The Alcoa Highway (U.S. Route 129) bridge over the Tennessee River in Knoxville is named after Karnes.

== Medal of Honor citation ==
Rank and organization: Sergeant, U.S. Army, Company D, 117th Infantry, 30th Division. Place and date: Near Estrees, France, October 8, 1918. Entered service at: Knoxville, Tenn. Born: 1889, Arlington, Tenn. G.O. No.: 50, W.D., 1919.

Citation:

During an advance, his company was held up by a machinegun, which was enfilading the line. Accompanied by another soldier, he advanced against this position and succeeded in reducing the nest by killing 3 and capturing 7 of the enemy and their guns.

== See also ==
- List of Medal of Honor recipients
- List of Medal of Honor recipients for World War I
