= 117th =

117th is the ordinal form of the number 117. 117th or One hundred and [spell out] may also refer to:

- A fraction, 1/117, equal to one of 117 equal parts

== Geography ==
- 117th meridian east, a line of longitude
- 117th meridian west, a line of longitude

== Military ==
- 117th Brigade (disambiguation)
- 117th Division (disambiguation)
- 117th Regiment (disambiguation)

== See also ==
- April 27, 117th day of the year in a standard year
