= Edward R. Talley =

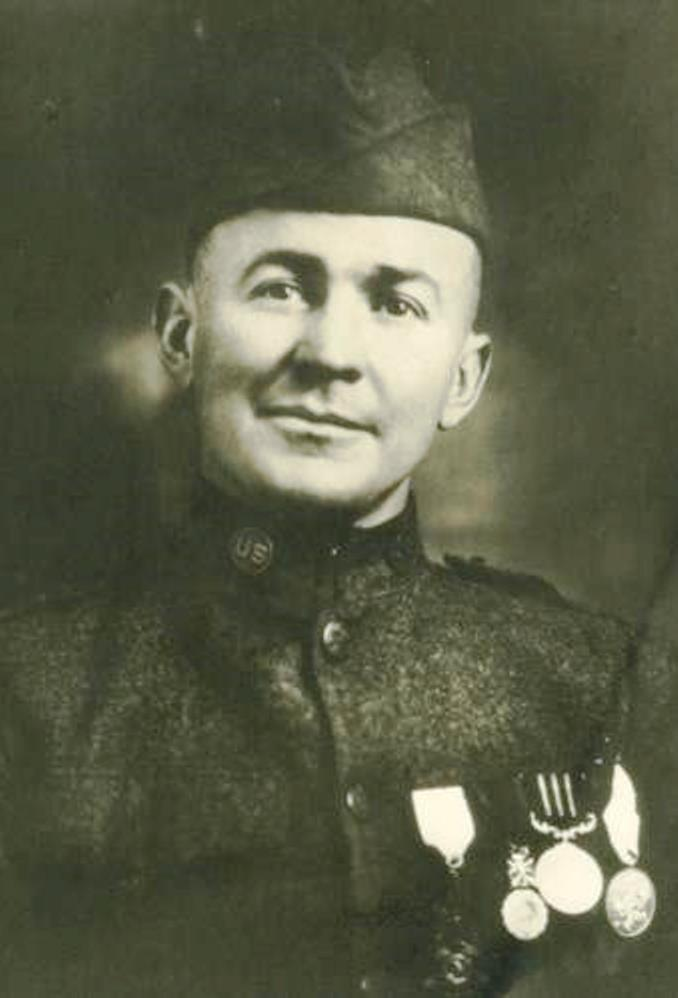
- Medal of Honor recipient
- Born: September 8, 1890; Russellville, Tennessee, U.S.
- Died: December 14, 1950 (aged 60); Tennessee, U.S.
- Burial place: Bent Creek Cemetery; Whitesburg, Tennessee
- Military career
- Allegiance: United States
- Branch: United States Army
- Rank: Sergeant
- Service number: 1309598
- Unit: 117th Infantry Regiment
- Conflicts: World War I
- Awards: Medal of Honor

Edward R. Talley (September 8 (or 6), 1890 – December 14, 1950) was a United States Army soldier who received the Medal of Honor for his actions near Ponchaux, France during World War I.

== Biography ==
Depending on the reference, Edward R. Talley was born on either September 6 or 8, 1890 in Russellville, Tennessee. He joined the United States Army from Russellville and after completing recruit training was sent to France where he distinguished himself in action near Ponchaux, France. He was a Sergeant, in Company L, 117th Infantry, 30th Division when he was awarded the Medal of Honor for his actions on October 7, 1918.

Talley died December 14, 1950, and is buried at Bent Creek Cemetery in Whitesburg, Tennessee.

== Medal of Honor citation ==
Rank and organization: Sergeant, U.S. Army, Company L, 117th Infantry, 30th Division. Place and date: Near Ponchaux, France, October 7, 1918. Entered service at: Russellville, Tenn. Born: September 8, 1890, Russellville, Tenn. G.O. No.: 50, W.D., 1919.

Citation:

Undeterred by seeing several comrades killed in attempting to put a hostile machine gun nest out of action, Sgt. Talley attacked the position single-handed. Armed only with a rifle, he rushed the nest in the face of intense enemy fire, killed or wounded at least 6 of the crew, and silenced the gun. When the enemy attempted to bring forward another gun and ammunition he drove them back by effective fire from his rifle.

== See also ==
- List of Medal of Honor recipients
- List of Medal of Honor recipients for World War I
