= Harold G. Kiner =

United States Army soldier

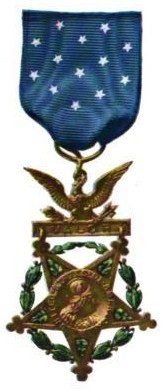
- Born: April 14, 1924; Aline, Oklahoma, US
- Died: October 2, 1944 (aged 20) near Palenberg, Germany
- Burial place: Eastern Star Cemetery, Aline, Oklahoma
- Military career
- Allegiance: United States
- Branch: United States Army
- Rank: Private
- Units: 117th Infantry Regiment, 30th Infantry Division
- Conflicts: World War II
- Awards: Medal of Honor

Harold G. Kiner (April 14, 1924 – October 2, 1944) was a United States Army soldier and a recipient of the United States military's highest decoration—the Medal of Honor—for his actions in World War II.

== Biography ==
Kiner joined the Army from Enid, Oklahoma, and by October 2, 1944, was serving as a private in Company F, 117th Infantry Regiment, 30th Infantry Division. On that day, near Palenberg, Germany, he smothered the blast of an enemy-thrown hand grenade with his body, sacrificing himself to protect those around him. For this action, he was posthumously awarded the Medal of Honor eight months later, on June 23, 1945.

Kiner, aged 20 at his death, was buried at Eastern Star Cemetery in his birthplace of Aline, Oklahoma.

== Medal of Honor citation ==
Private Kiner's official Medal of Honor citation reads:

With 4 other men, he was leading in a frontal assault 2 October 1944, on a Siegfried Line pillbox near Palenberg, Germany. Machinegun fire from the strongly defended enemy position 25 yards away pinned down the attackers. The Germans threw hand grenades, 1 of which dropped between Pvt. Kiner and 2 other men. With no hesitation, Private Kiner hurled himself upon the grenade, smothering the explosion. By his gallant action and voluntary sacrifice of his own life, he saved his 2 comrades from serious injury or death.

== Awards and decorations ==

Badge	Combat Infantryman Badge		
1st row	Medal of Honor		
2nd row	Bronze Star Medal	Purple Heart	Army Good Conduct Medal
3rd row	American Campaign Medal	European–African–Middle Eastern Campaign Medal with one campaign star	World War II Victory Medal

== See also ==
- List of Medal of Honor recipients
- List of Medal of Honor recipients for World War II
