= Bracy =

Bracy is a surname. Notable people with the surname include:

- Catherine Bracy, American activist
- Chris Bracy (born 2005), American football player
- Clara T. Bracy (1848–1941), English actress
- Henry Bracy (1846–1917), Welsh opera singer
- Marvin Bracy (born 1993), American sprinter
- Napoleon Bracy Jr., American politician
- Randolph Bracy (born 1977), American politician
- Terrence L. Bracy, American activist
