= 117th Division =

In military terms, 117th Division or 117th Infantry Division may refer to:

== Infantry divisions ==
- 117th Division (People's Republic of China)
- 117th Infantry Division (German Empire)
- 117th Jäger Division, Germany
- 117th Division (Imperial Japanese Army)
- 117th Guards Rifle Division, Soviet Union
- 117th Motor Rifle Division, Soviet Union
- 117th Rifle Division, Soviet Union

== See also ==
- List of military divisions by number
- 117th Brigade (disambiguation)
- 117th Regiment (disambiguation)
- 117th Squadron (disambiguation)
- 117th (disambiguation)
