= 117th Regiment of Foot =

Two regiments of the British Army have been numbered the 117th Regiment of Foot:

- 117th Regiment of Foot (Invalids), raised in 1762 and renumbered as the 74th in 1763
- 117th Regiment of Foot (1794), raised in 1794
