= Catherine Bracy =

American activist

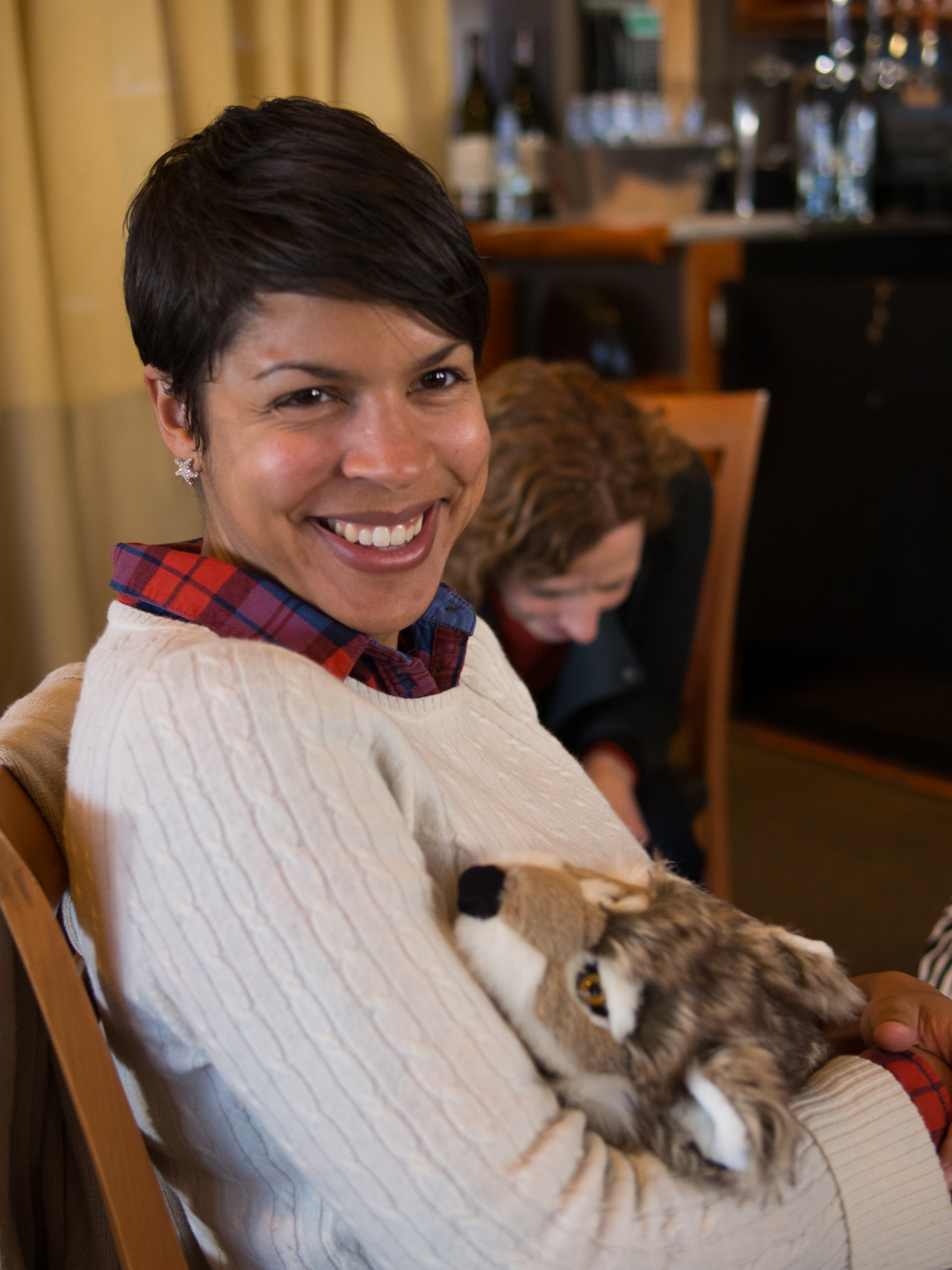
- Bracy at 2013 Code for America staff retreat
- Education: University of Texas at Austin; Boston College
- Website: https://techequitycollaborative.org/

Catherine Bracy is a CEO and co-founder of TechEquity, a tax and housing policy advocacy organization whose backers include the Chan Zuckerberg Initiative.

== Early life and education ==
Bracy studied communication at Boston College, graduating in 2002. She wanted to be a journalist, but decided against it after completing an internship at NBC in Boston.

== Career ==
Bracy worked as Administrative Director of Harvard University's Berkman Center for Internet & Society from 2002 to 2010. She joined the University of Texas at Austin, earning a master's degree in public policy in 2011. She worked for the John S. and James L. Knight Foundation, managing the News Challenge, an innovation competition for journalists.

Bracy worked for the Obama administration in 2011 and 2012, heading up the technology field office in San Francisco.She helped to design the technology policy of Barack Obama. In 2013 she joined Code for America, looking after international programs. She served as Senior Director for Code for America, building their brigade to over 50,000 civic tech volunteers. The brigade, an international network that works with local governments to improve cities, were responsible for 64% of the total growth of civic tech in the USA. She became interested in civic hacking,

She regularly delivers keynote talks, talking about technology and politics. In 2017 she delivered a TED talk Why good hackers make good citizens, that has been observed over 800,000 times.

She is on the board of directors of the Data & Society Research Institute and the Public Lab. Bracy is co-founder and executive director of TechEquity.
