= 117th Brigade =

117th Brigade may refer to:

== Spain ==
- 117th Mixed Brigade

== Ukraine ==
- 117th Heavy Mechanized Brigade
- 117th Territorial Defense Brigade, a unit of the Ukrainian Territorial Defense Forces

== United Kingdom ==
- 117th Brigade (United Kingdom)
- 117th Infantry Brigade Royal Marines

== United States ==
- 117th Engineer Brigade

== See also ==
- 117th Division (disambiguation)
- 117th Regiment (disambiguation)
