= Estrées, Aisne =

Estrées
- Commune
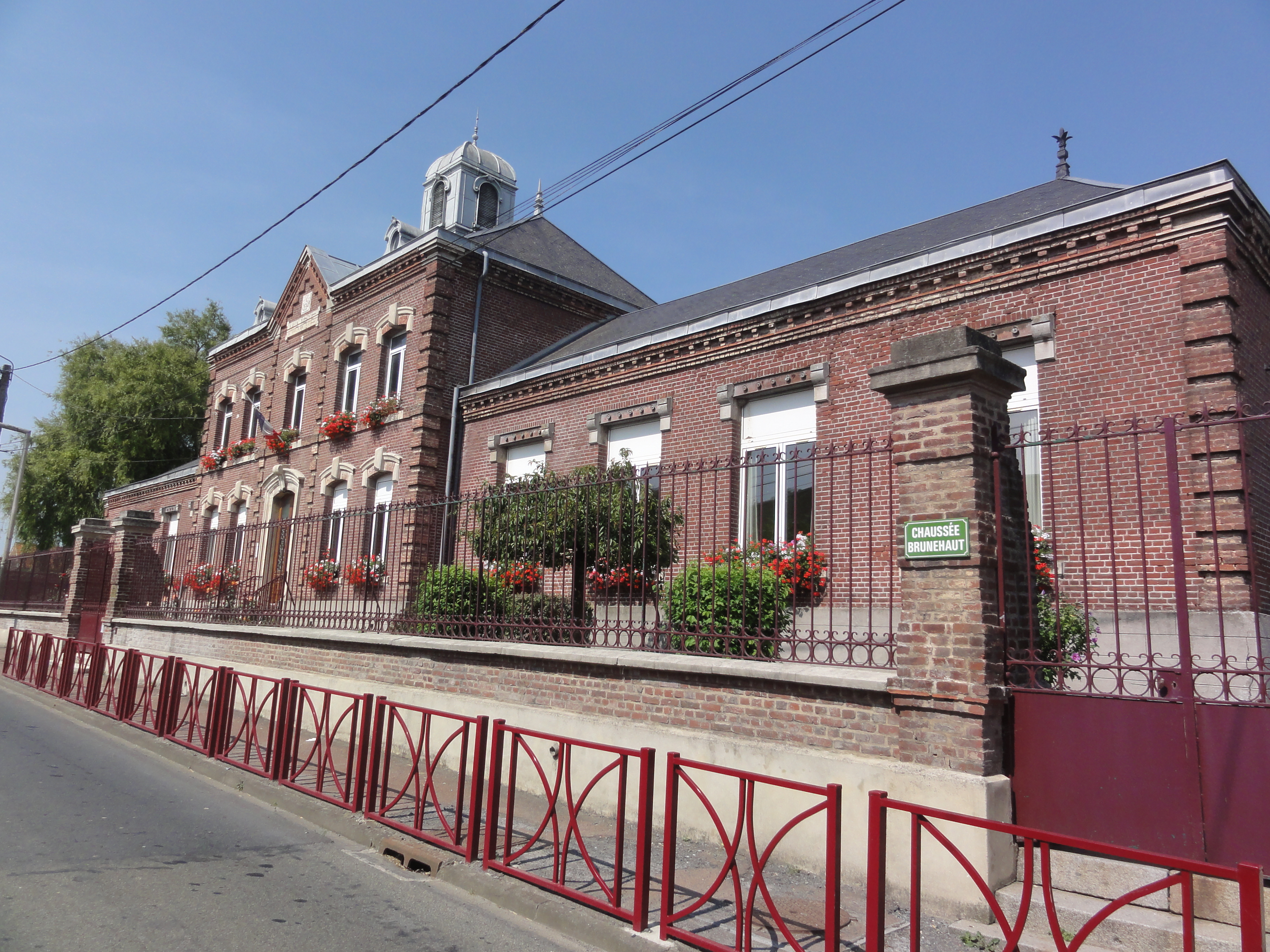
- The town hall of Estrées
- Location of Estrées
- Location within France Location within Hauts-de-France
- Coordinates: 49°58′07″N 3°17′20″E
- Country: France
- Region: Hauts-de-France
- Department: Aisne
- Arrondissement: Saint-Quentin
- Canton: Bohain-en-Vermandois
- Intercommunality: Pays du Vermandois

Government
  - Mayor (2026–32): Jean Charles De Wever
- Area^{1}: 7.04 km^{2} (2.72 sq mi)
- Elevation: 136 m (446 ft)
- Highest elevation: 149 m (489 ft)
- Lowest elevation: 97 m (318 ft)
- Population (2023): 408
  - Density: 58.0/km^{2} (150/sq mi)
- Time zone: UTC+01:00 (CET)
  - Summer (DST): UTC+02:00 (CEST)
- INSEE/Postal code: 02291 /02420
- ^{1} French Land Register data, which excludes lakes, ponds, glaciers > 1 km^{2} (0.386 sq mi or 247 acres) and river estuaries.

Estrées is a commune in the Aisne department in Hauts-de-France in northern France.

In the Picard dialect, it is called Etré. It is one of many villages in the north of France bearing the name Estrées. The etymology of the name is from strata (cognate of English "street"), the word for the stone-layered Roman roads in the area (some of which turned into modern highways). Hence Estreti, village on the road which developed into Estrées.

Also known in ancient times as Strata or Estreti, history mentions an abbey in the 12th century. A parish was created there about 1189 with a priest sent from the abbey of Mont Saint Martin to buy land and help the poor. In 1777 Pierre Nicolas Leroy began manufacturing silk gauze here. Inhabitants are called Estrésiens.

== Administration ==
List of mayors
Term	Name
2001–2008	Jean-Marie Courtois
2008–2020	Gérard Lempereur
2020–incumbent	Jean Charles De Wever

== Population ==
Historical population
Year	Pop.	±% p.a.
1968	474	—
1975	401	−2.36%
1982	423	+0.77%
1990	434	+0.32%
1999	446	+0.30%
2007	410	−1.05%
2012	419	+0.44%
2017	412	−0.34%
2023	408	−0.16%
Source: INSEE

== See also ==
- Communes of the Aisne department
