= Statue of Alexander Hamilton =

Statue of Alexander Hamilton may refer to:

- Statue of Alexander Hamilton (Boston)
- Statue of Alexander Hamilton (Central Park)
- Statue of Alexander Hamilton (Chicago)
- Statue of Alexander Hamilton (Columbia University)
- Statue of Alexander Hamilton (U.S. Capitol)
- Statue of Alexander Hamilton (Washington, D.C.)
