= Roger Noble Burnham =

American sculptor (1876–1962)

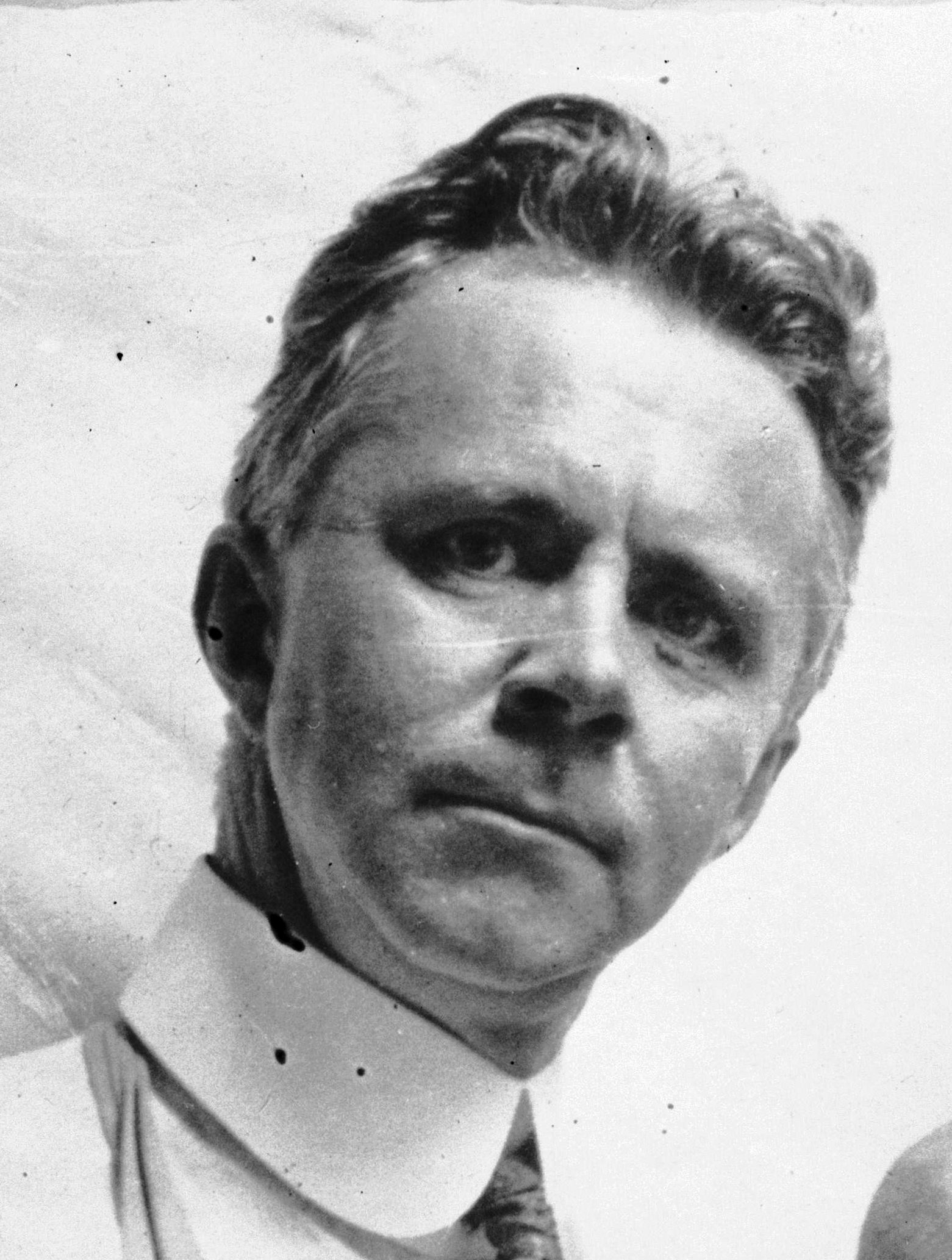
- Born: August 10, 1876; Hingham, Massachusetts, United States
- Died: March 14, 1962 (aged 85); Los Angeles, California, United States
- Education: Harvard University; Caroline Hunt Rimmer; Karl Bitter; George Brewster
- Known for: Sculpture
- Notable work: The Trojan; Boston City Hall Annex figures Rudolph Valentino Memorial

Roger Noble Burnham (August 10, 1876 – March 14, 1962) was an American sculptor and teacher. He is best remembered for creating The Trojan (1930), the unofficial mascot of the University of Southern California.

== Life and career ==
He was the eldest of the four children of Arthur Burnham and Katharine Bray. His father was an 1870 graduate of Harvard University, and a Boston banker. He grew up just outside Boston, and attended the Robert G. Shaw School and The Hale School for Boys.

Burnham studied art and architecture at Harvard, graduating in 1899. He studied privately with Caroline Hunt Rimmer, and opened his own sculpture studio in Boston, specializing in portrait works. He moved to New York City in 1903, to work on the sculpture program for the 1904 St. Louis World's Fair, under Karl Bitter. He assisted George Brewster on twenty relief portrait medallions for the exterior of the Fair's Palace of Fine Arts, now the St. Louis Art Museum.

Burnham graduated from the American Academy of Dramatic Arts in Los Angeles in 1907, and made an extended 1908 tour of the South and Southwest in a production of Richard Brinsley Sheridan's The Rivals. He worked as an actor in early Hollywood films, and later performed Shakespeare, in Los Angeles.

He returned to Boston, and taught modeling at Harvard's School of Architecture from 1913 to 1917. He was chairman of the Cambridge, Massachusetts Chapter of the Boy Scouts of America, and moved to Hawaii in June 1917, to establish Boy Scout troops in the U.S. territory. He taught at the Otis Art Institute in Los Angeles from 1926 to 1932.

=== The Trojan ===
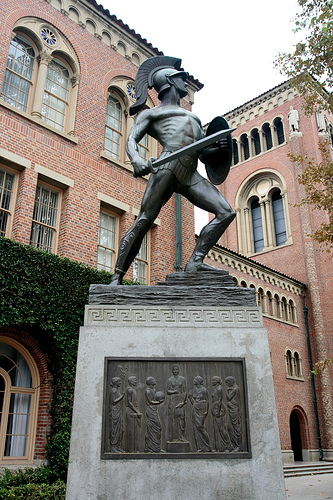
The Trojan (1930), University of Southern California, Los Angeles

The Trojan (1930)—officially named the Trojan Shrine, but affectionately called "Tommy Trojan"—is a monument on the University of Southern California campus. The university's athletic teams are the USC Trojans.

The monument consists of a life size bronze warrior, wearing a championship belt and pleated skirt, a mohawk-plumed helmet, shin guards and sandals. He wields the Sword of Knowledge in one hand, and holds the Shield of Courage in the other. The figure stands upon a concrete pedestal, with inscriptions, bronze relief panels, and a Greek key border. The front of the base features the bronze seal of the university, with "The Trojan" inscribed above it, and words listing the traits of an ideal Trojan inscribed below it: "Faithful," "Scholarly," "Skillful," "Courageous," "Ambitious." The left side of the base features a bronze relief panel representing athletics. The right side of the base features a bronze relief panel representing scholarship. The rear of the base features an incised flaming torch, and a bronze plaque with a quote in Latin and English.

Burnham's primary models for the figure were All-American USC football players Russ Saunders (head and upper half) and Erny Pinckert (lower half).

=== Military monuments ===
Burnham was living in Honolulu in April 1918, when the United States entered World War I, and joined the Hawaii National Guard. Soon after the armistice, he designed a war memorial for the entrance to the city's Kapiolani Park. "It consists of three figures, the central one typifying Liberty while beneath are a Hawaiian warrior and a Hawaiian maiden. The warrior offers his spear while the maiden extends in outstretched hands a lei." Instead of a formal monument with sculpture, the Waikiki Natatorium War Memorial (1927) was built at Waikiki Beach.

He was commissioned to create a statue of Frank Luke, Jr. (1930), for the grounds of the Arizona State Capitol in Phoenix. An ace U.S. Army pilot who died in World War I, Second Lieutenant Luke was posthumously awarded the Medal of Honor. A bronze plaque on the rear of the monument's base lists the names of the other 318 Arizonans who died in the war. The monument was dedicated on Armistice Day, 1930. Luke Air Force Base, in Glendale, Arizona, was named for the pilot in 1941.

Burnham took leave from Harvard to serve in the Massachusetts Naval Reserve during the Spanish-American War. More than fifty years later, he created The Spirit of '98 (1950), the United Spanish War Veterans Memorial for the Sawtelle Veterans Home in Los Angeles County. It featured a tall, stepped concrete base, with marble figures of a soldier and sailor flanking a hooded goddess figure holding a torch. Burnham's marble statues were toppled in a 1971 earthquake. The memorial was restored with fiberglass replicas of the statues by sculptor David Wilkins, and relocated to Los Angeles National Cemetery.

He created the 8 ft (2.4 m) bronze statue of General Douglas MacArthur for the MacArthur Monument (1955), in Los Angeles's MacArthur Park.

=== Other works ===
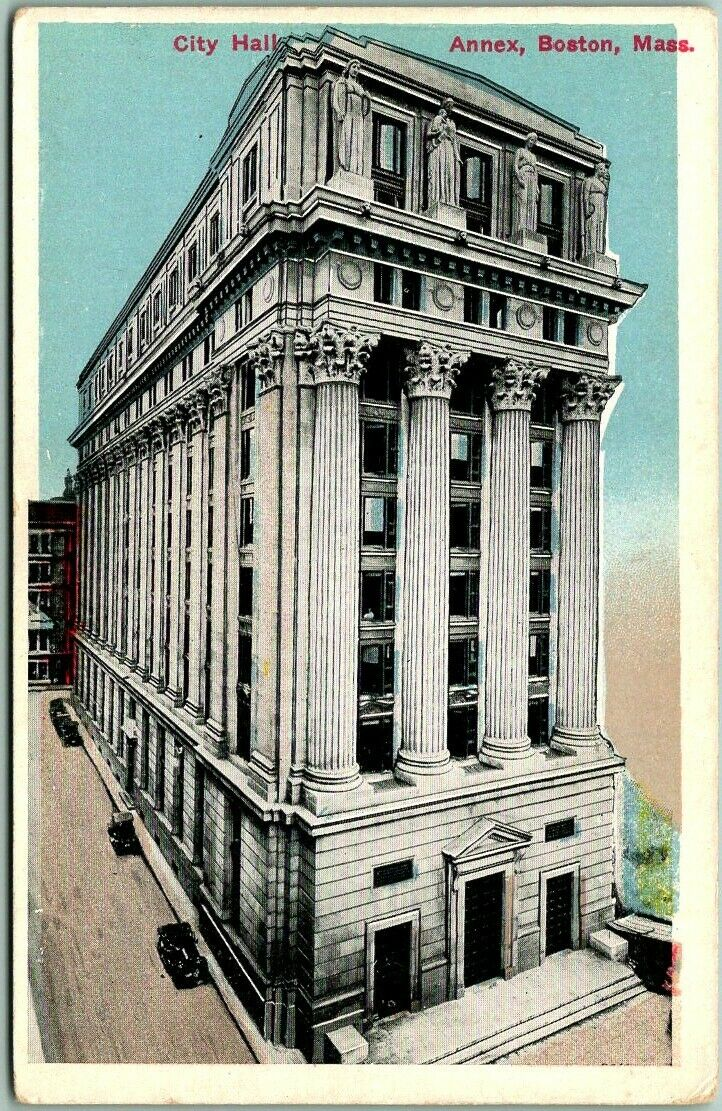
Boston City Hall Annex, c.1915. The statues were destroyed in 1947.

Architect Edward T. P. Graham designed the 10-story Boston City Hall Annex (1912-1914), and Burnham (Graham's Harvard classmate) was given the commission to model four colossal figures for its 9th story cornice.

Needing some strong vertical projections to carry the lines of the four large Corinthian columns on the front into the attic story, Mr. Edward T. P. Graham, architect of the Annex, decided to use partially attached human figures. Keeping their architectural character in mind, the sculptor designed the figures with a certain stiffness and with emphasis upon the vertical lines of the Greek drapery. The proportions, particularly of the faces, were modified to meet the fact that the figures would be seen from far below and foreshortened.
Four standing figures, each 16 feet high and projecting 3 feet 2 inches from the building. Of reinforced concrete to match the limestone of the building.
By Roger Noble Burnham. Contracted for by the commission at $8,000, July 29, 1913.

The four goddess figures were cast in concrete and hollow (to reduce their weight). Even so, each figure weighed approximately 8 tons (7.26 metric tonnes), and needed to be hoisted more than 100 ft (30 m) up to the cornice. Burnham's figures were deemed unsafe, and destroyed in the process of removing them from the façade, in 1947.

Following the 1926 premature death of silent screen star Rudolph Valentino, Los Angeles City Council initially opposed the creation of a public monument to him. The city eventually relented, and approved the erection of a memorial fountain in Hollywood's De Longpre Park. Burnham's fountain sculpture was an Art Deco male nude, Aspiration. Made of bronze and covered with gold-leaf, the streamlined figure looked skyward while standing upon a black marble globe. Its cubical black marble base featured an inscription: "Erected in Memory of / RUDOLPH VALENTINO / 1895 - 1926 / Presented by His Friends and / Admirers from Every Walk of / Life and in All Parts of the World / in Appreciation of the Happi- / ness Brought to Them by His / Cinema Portrayals." The fountain was dedicated May 6, 1930, on what would have been Valentino's 35th birthday.

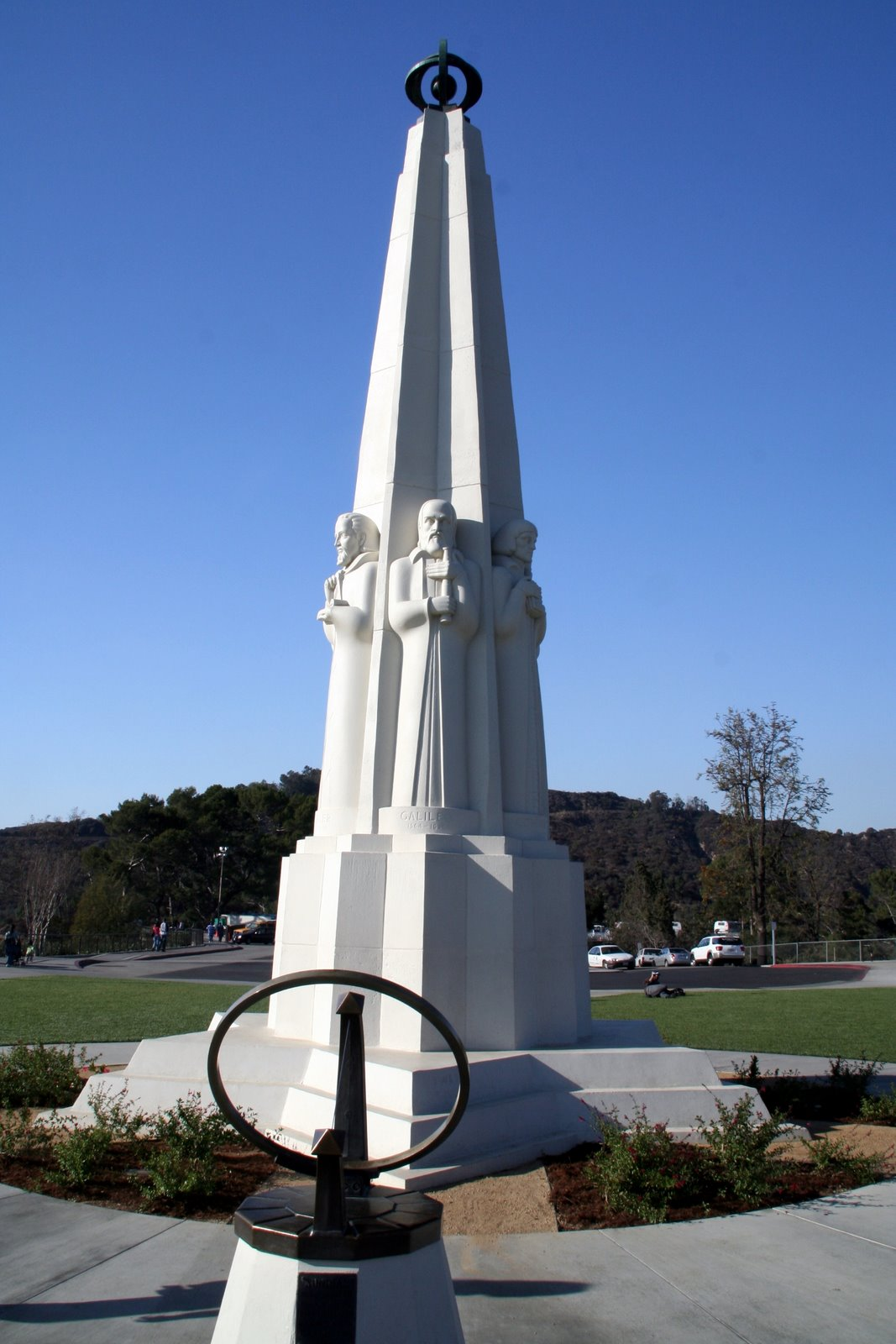
Astronomers Monument (1934), Griffith Observatory, Los Angeles, CA

The Astronomers Monument (1934), at Griffith Observatory, Los Angeles, was built by the Public Works of Art Project of the New Deal. Designed by sculptor Archibald Garner, it is a hexagonal cast concrete obelisk, crowned by a bronze armillary sphere. Above its star-shaped base are six V-shaped recesses, in each of which stands a cast concrete Art Deco statue of an astronomer from history. The figures are approximately 9 ft (2.7 m) in height, and each was modeled by a different sculptor. Burnham created the John Herschel figure. The monument was dedicated November 25, 1934.

Will Rogers, an Oklahoma cowboy who became a nationally known humorist and movie star, died in an August 15, 1935 plane crash. Under contract to 20th Century Fox, the studio decided to name its new sound stage for Rogers, and commissioned Burnham to create a memorial plaque. The dedication was November 23, 1935, and the bronze portrait plaque was unveiled by 7-year-old Shirley Temple, Rogers's intended co-star for their next movie.

Burnham created a number of medals for the Medallic Art Company in New York City, and figurines of his sculptures were mass-produced by Roxor Studios in Chicago. One early figurine was Speed Demon (1919), which featured a threaded screw hole for mounting as an automobile hood ornament. The Spirit of Rotary (1920) was marketed to members of Rotary International, and Dedication to Service (1921) to members of Kiwanas International. One of his best-selling figurines was The Trojan (1930), marketed to USC alumni.

At age 78, Burnham worked on a science exhibit for Disneyland. The centerpiece of Monsanto's Hall of Chemistry was the Chemitron (1955): a giant ring of eight, clear plastic test tubes—each about 8 ft (2.4 m) in height—that individually spun as the entire ring rotated. He modeled anthropomorphic figures representing the eight ingredients used to make plastics: Air, Coal, Limestone, Oil, Phosphate, Salt, Sulphur, and Water. His figures were cast in colorful tinted plastic, and one was mounted atop each spinning test tube.

=== Honors, exhibitions and awards ===
Burnham was a member of the Boston Architectural Club, the American Numismatic Society, the Honolulu Art Society, the Painters and Sculptors Club of Los Angeles, and the Rotary Club of Los Angeles.

He exhibited at the 1911 Espoizione Internazionale d'arte in Rome. The Copley Gallery in Boston hosted a one-man-show of his sculpture in early 1913. He exhibited at the 1913 Salon of the Société des Artistes Français in Paris, and the 1913 Exposition Internationale de Gand in Brussels. The John Herron Art Institute in Indianapolis hosted a one-man-show of his sculpture in April/May 1914, and he exhibited at the 1915 Panama-Pacific International Exhibition in San Francisco. He exhibited the bust of his wife and a collection of medals at the 1914 exhibition at the Pennsylvania Academy of the Fine Arts, in Philadelphia; and his door panels for the Forsyth Dental Infirmary at PAFA's 1917 exhibition. His work was part of the sculpture competition of the 1932 Summer Olympics in Los Angeles.

Burnham created the Henry O. Avery Prize for Sculpture medal (1904) for the Architectural League of New York, and became the first recipient of that medal. He won the 1912 national competition to design the University of California's scholarship medal. He created the Seal for the 1928 Pacific Southwest Exposition in Long Beach, California, and was awarded a Diploma of Honor at the exposition. His portrait bust of poet Alfred Noyes was awarded First Prize at the Los Angeles County Museum of Art's 1944 annual exhibition.

=== Personal ===
Burnham married writer Eleanor Howard Waring (1868-1959), on June 18, 1909. Their honeymoon trip in a hot air balloon made the front page of The New York Times.

He and his wife moved to Hawaii in June 1917. She founded an amateur theatre group in Honolulu, the "Lanai Players," and directed the productions. The couple left Hawaii in 1922, and lived in Berkeley, California for a couple years, before settling in Los Angeles. Burnham found the view from Griffith Park inspiring, and built a studio "in a little dead-end place, perched almost on the Observatory grounds."

Burnham was a religious man, and in 1951, "outlined a plan before his city's religious leaders in which he proposed to place a 150-ft. statue of the smiling Jesus upon a mountain towering over Hollywood." The project was never built.

Eleanor and Roger Burnham were married for 50 years, until her death in 1959. He died three years later, in Los Angeles, following an extended illness.

== Selected works ==
- The Ideal Type of Morgan (bronze, c.1912), equine figure. Burnham's wife donated a cast to the Georgia Morgan Horse Club.
- Hawaii War Monument (1919). Proposed monument for Honolulu's Kapiolani Park. Unbuilt.
- Dedication to Service (medium, 1921), a life size male nude with outstretched arms, looking upward. Exhibited at the Art Institute of Chicago, 1921
- Luther Burbank (bronze, c.1923), Field Museum, Chicago, Illinois. The life size, half-length figure holds a Burbank Plum in one hand and a Shasta Daisy in the other.
  - Burnham's full size clay model is at the Luther Burbank Home and Gardens, Santa Rosa, California.
- The Hand of God, Holding the Earth to be Moulded by Man (medium, 1924). Proposed colossal sculpture for a Luther Burbank Memorial Park in Santa Rosa California. Unbuilt.
- The Trojan (bronze, 1930), height: 8 ft (2.4 m), University of Southern California, Los Angeles, California. The 10 ft (3.0 m) concrete base features bronze relief plaques and inscriptions.
- Lieutenant Frank Luke, Jr. (bronze, 1930), Arizona State Capitol, Phoenix, Arizona.
- Aspiration (gold-leafed bronze, 1930), height: 50 in (130 cm), Rudolph Valentino Memorial Fountain, De Longpre Park, Hollywood, California.
- John Herschel (cast concrete, 1934), Astronomers Monument, Griffith Observatory, Griffith Park, Los Angeles, California. One of six statues of astronomers, each modeled by a different sculptor.
- United Spanish War Veterans Memorial, original: (marble and concrete, 1950), replica: (fiberglass and concrete, 1973), Los Angeles National Cemetery, Los Angeles, California. Burnham's marble statues were destroyed in a 1971 earthquake; sculptor David Wilkins created fiberglass replicas.

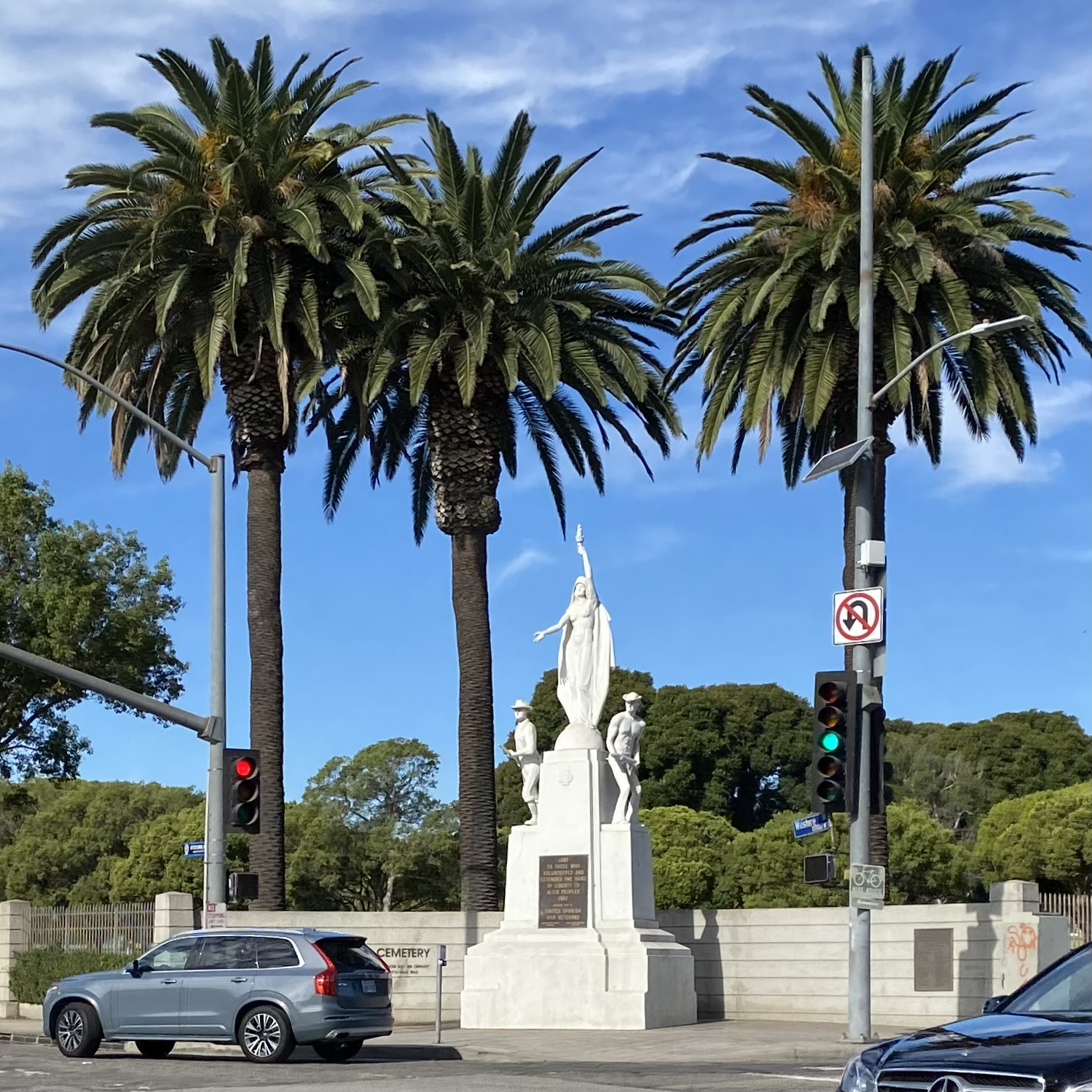
Spanish War Veterans Memorial, L.A. National Cemetery

- The Answer (1951). Proposed colossal statue of Jesus Christ for a mountain overlooking Los Angeles. Unbuilt.
- General Douglas MacArthur Monument (bronze, 1955), height: 8 ft (2.4 m), MacArthur Park, Los Angeles, California
- 8 anthropomorphic figures (tinted plastic, 1955), Hall of Chemistry, Disneyland, Anaheim, California

=== Portrait busts ===
- William H. Crane as "David Harum" (medium, c.1901). American comic actor in a famous role.
- Edward Perry Warren (bronze, 1911), Oxford University, United Kingdom. Exhibited at the 1911 Espoizione Internazionale d'arte in Rome
- Eleanor Waring Burnham (medium, 1914), portrait of the sculptor's wife. Exhibited at the 1915 Panama-Pacific International Exposition in San Francisco
- George Henry Forsyth (bronze, 1916), entrance hall, Forsyth Dental Infirmary for Children, Boston, Massachusetts. (See Relief works, below)
- Frank Tenney Johnson (bronze, 1922), National Academy of Design, New York City
- Charles Keeler (medium, c.1922), Burnham's friend and neighbor in Berkeley, California
- Frances E. Willard (marble, 1932), California State Building, Los Angeles
- W. I. Travers (medium, 1934), Phineas Banning High School, Los Angeles. Posthumous portrait of the school's principal
- Frances Whitesell (medium, c.1935-1939)
- Senator Francis G. Newlands (medium, 1937), U.S. senator from Nevada
- Muriel Pulitzer (medium, 1938), sculptor of religious works
- Alfred Noyes (medium, 1944), British poet and playwright. Awarded First Prize at LACMA's 1944 exhibition

=== Relief works ===
- Bust of Margaret Howard Stockett Berkley (bronze, 1909), Maryland Center for History and Culture, Baltimore, Maryland. Portrait of a 9-year-old girl
- Bust of Fabian Fall (bronze, 1909), Harvard University Library, Cambridge, Massachusetts
- Justin Morgan Plaque (medium, c.1911), a circular plaque of a Morgan horse nuzzling a young woman. Eleanor Waring Burnham wrote a historical novel about the Morgan horse.
- Ernst Perabo at the Piano (bronze, c.1912), diameter: 15.5 in (39 cm), Museum of Fine Arts, Boston, Massachusetts Exhibited at the 1911 Espoizione Internazionale d'arte in Rome. Exhibited at the 1915 Panama-Pacific International Exposition in San Francisco.
- Uncle Remus Memorial Tablet (bronze, 1914), Joel Chandler Harris House, Atlanta, Georgia. Dedicated May 23, 1914. "Bre'r Rabbit making a speech to the animals." Burnham and his wife were both members of the Uncle Remus Memorial Association.
- Bust of Joel Chandler Harris (bronze, 1914), Joel Chandler Harris House, Atlanta, Georgia. Dedicated May 23, 1914.
- Panel: Education (medium, c.1913), Castle Hall, Punahou School, Honolulu, Hawaii
- Carrington Mason Memorial Plaque (medium, 1915), Cossitt Library, Memphis, Tennessee
- Forsyth Dental Infirmary for Children, Boston, Massachusetts. Burnham also modeled the bronze bust of the building's donor, George Henry Forsyth, in the entrance hall. The building is now part of the Museum of Fine Arts, Boston.
  - Panel: The Mother: Giver of Life and Love (bronze, 1916), main entrance doors.
  - Panel: The Commonwealth: Giver of Health and Learning (bronze, 1916), main entrance doors
  - Panel: Alice in Wonderland (bronze, 1916), children's entrance doors
  - Panel: Bre'r Rabbit and Bre'r Fox (bronze, 1916), children's entrance doors
- Fireplace surround: Jack and the Beanstalk (medium, 1916)
- Susan Williams Graham Memorial Fountain (marble, 1916, 1920), Coker Arboretum, University of North Carolina, Chapel Hill. Created as a watering trough for horses, Burnham's arched panel of a Greek-gowned woman pouring water from an urn was added in 1920. Relocated from Franklin Street to Coker Arboretum in 1956.
- Lowrey Memorial Fountain (Tennessee pink marble & bronze, 1919), Hawaiian Mission Children's Society, Honolulu, Hawaii. Beside the circular pool is a low-arched marble stele with an inset bronze relief panel, depicting Cherilla Storrs Lowrey and others "at work on plans for a City Beautiful."
- Hawaii Glee Club Tablet (bronze, 1924), Hamilton Library, University of Hawaii at Manoa, Honolulu A Greek athlete in skirt and helmet and a Hawaiian athlete in loincloth and helmet jointly holding up a laurel wreath. Trophy for annual singing contest among Hawaiian choirs
- John Muir Memorial Plaque (bronze, 1924), John Muir Cabin site, Yosemite National Park, California
- Friendliness - Seal of the Pacific Northwest Exhibition (medium, 1928), Long Beach, California. "Circular seal with figure of Friendship, globe and exposition grounds. Lettering around edge."
- Rudolph Valentino Portrait Plaque (painted plaster, year), diameter: 15 in (38 cm)
- Bust of Albert Beck Wenzell (medium, 1931)
- Will Rogers Memorial Plaque (bronze, 1935), Will Rogers Sound Stage, 20th Century Fox Studios, Century City, Los Angeles, California. Unveiled by 7-year-old Shirley Temple, November 23, 1935.
- Alexander Hamilton - Scholar, Soldier, Statesman (bronze, 1935), Alexander Hamilton High School, Los Angeles, California
- Panel: The Way (medium, c.1935), University of Southern California, Los Angeles
- The Spirit of Hollywood Plaque (medium, 1937), unlocated. Actress Betty Grable posed as the model.
- Mural: San Pedro Harbor in 1850 (medium, c.1949), San Pedro Branch Library (1948), Los Angeles County, California. A large painted relief on the library's façade, depicting a birds-eye view of the harbor a century earlier

=== Architectural sculpture ===
- Four colossal cornice figures, Boston City Hall Annex, 26 Court Street, Boston, Massachusetts. Removed and destroyed, 1947.
  - Charity (cast concrete, 1914), height: 16 ft (4.9 m), holds an infant
  - Industry (cast concrete, 1914), height: 16 ft (4.9 m), holds a wheel and a spindle of yarn
  - Education (cast concrete, 1914), height: 16 ft (4.9 m), holds a quill pen and a book
  - Law and Order (cast concrete, 1914), height: 16 ft (4.9 m), holds fasces and the Book of Laws
- Augustus Busch Hall, Harvard University, Cambridge, Massachusetts
  - Head of Athena (medium, completed 1917, dedicated 1921), over entrance doors
  - Tritons (medium, completed 1917, dedicated 1921),
  - Chiron (Centaur) (medium, completed 1917, dedicated 1921), cornice figure

=== Miniatures ===
- Medal: Henry O. Avery Prize for Sculpture (bronze, 1904), Architectural League of New York. Burnham was the first recipient of the medal he designed.
- Plaque: Self-Portrait (plaster, 1905), height: 9 in (23 cm), oval bust of Burnham looking directly at the viewer
- Medal: Decennial Medal for Harvard University Class of 1899 (bronze, 1909), diameter: 1.9 in (4.8 cm)
- Medal: University of California Scholarship Medal (bronze, 1912), Medallic Art Company, New York, diameter: 2.625 in (6.67 cm). "Roger Noble Burnham of Massachusetts, winner in the recent National competition for a new design for the University Medal." Museum of Fine Arts, Boston, Massachusetts Exhibited at the 1915 Panama-Pacific International Exposition in San Francisco.
- Medal: Ernst Perabo at the Piano (bronze, 1914), miniature of Burnham's 1910 relief plaque.
- Figurine: Speed Demon (bronze, 1919), height: 4.25 in (10.8 cm), length: 11.125 in (28.26 cm), hood ornament
- Figurine: The Spirit of Rotary (medium, 1920). A hooded goddess holding a shield, wielding a sword, and standing upon the globe. Exhibited at the 1922 Rotary International Convention, held in Los Angeles.
- Figurine: Dedication to Service (patinated metal, 1921), height: 9 in (23 cm). "Model of a male figure with arms outstretched, standing erect and looking up." Advertized to members of Kiwanis International.
- Plaque: California Faience (terra cotta, 1922), oval portrait bust of a young woman, height: 8.5 in (22 cm)
- Medal: Luther Burbank (bronze, 1923), Medallic Art Company, New York. "Jubilee Medal," portrait bust celebrating the horticulturalist's 75th birthday
- Plaque: Mother and Daughter (bronze, 1926), oval double portrait bust, height: 3 in (7.6 cm)
- Medal: Pacific Northwest Exposition - Long Beach California 1928 (bronze, 1928), Medallic Art Company, New York, diameter: 2 in (51 mm)
- Figurine: The Trojan (bronze, 1930), height: 6.5 in (17 cm)
- Figurine: General Douglas MacArthur (bronze, 1952), height: 9.5 in (24 cm)
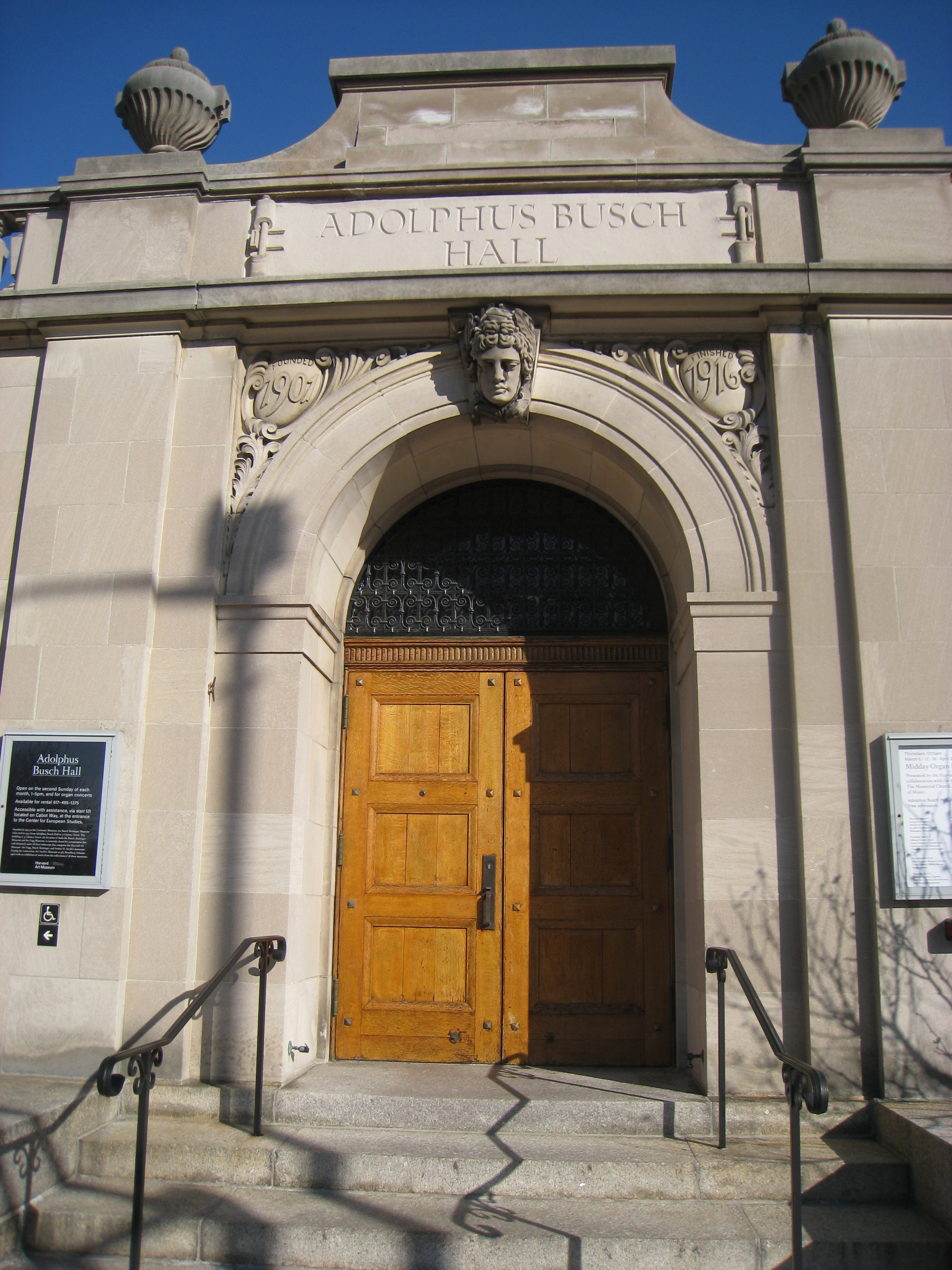
Head of Athena (c.1916), Augustus Busch Hall, Cambridge, MA

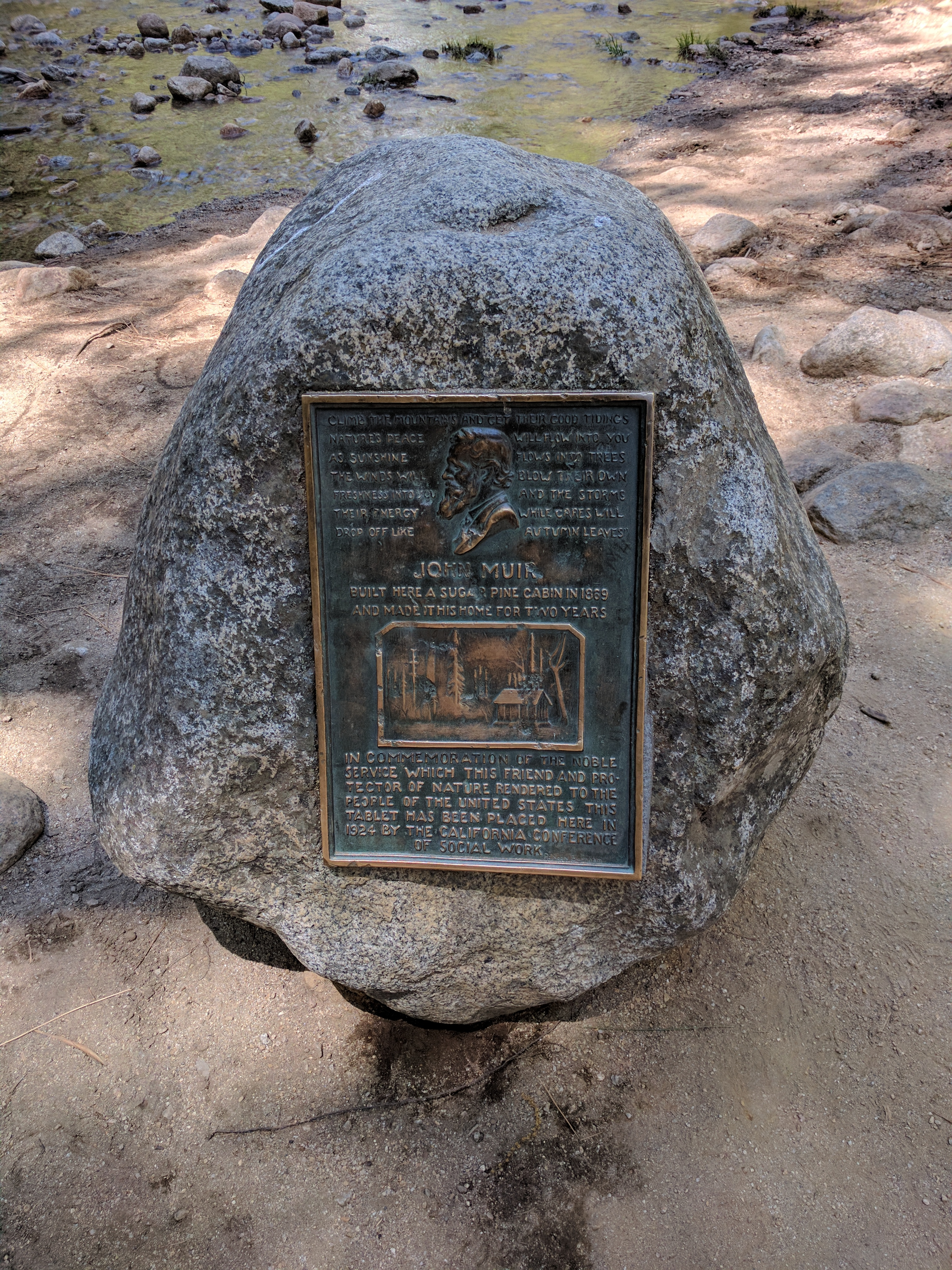
John Muir Memorial Plaque (1924), Yosemite National Park

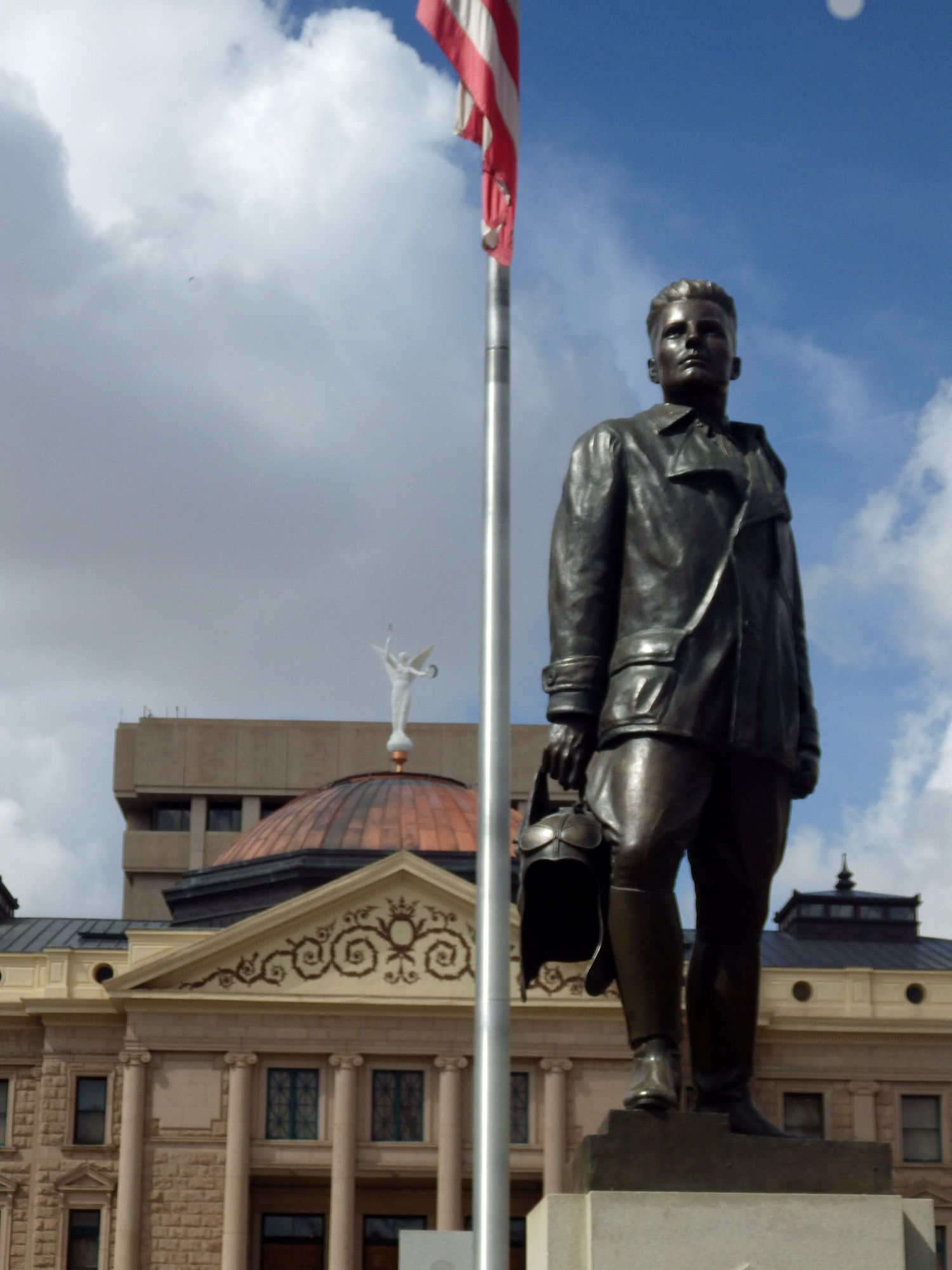
Frank Luke Jr. (1930), Arizona State Capitol, Phoenix

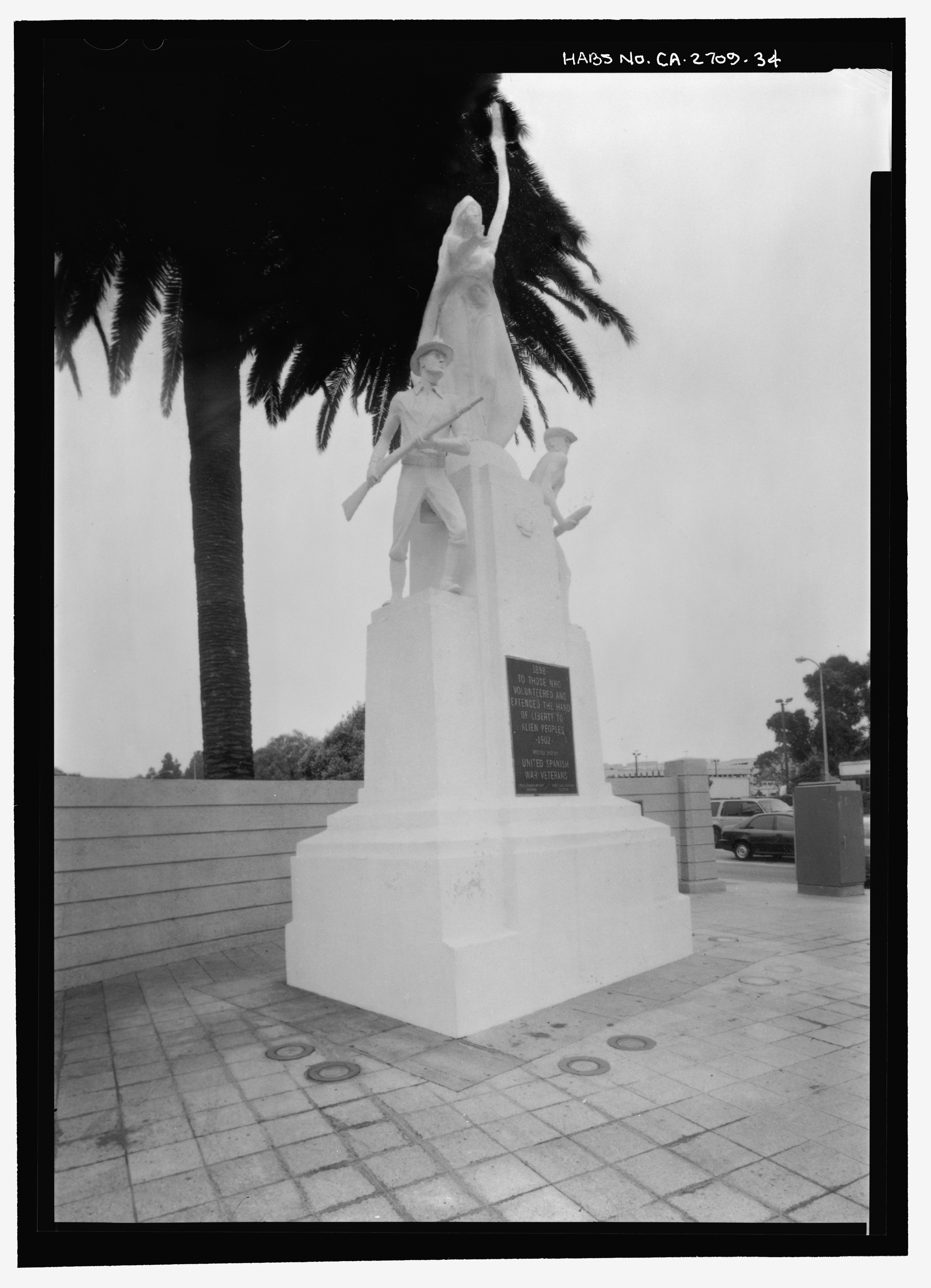
United Spanish War Veterans Monument (1950, 1973), Los Angeles National Cemetery

Douglas MacArthur Monument (1955), MacArthur Park, Los Angeles, CA
