= Frank Luke =

American fighter ace and Medal of Honor recipient (1897–1918)

Frank Luke Jr.
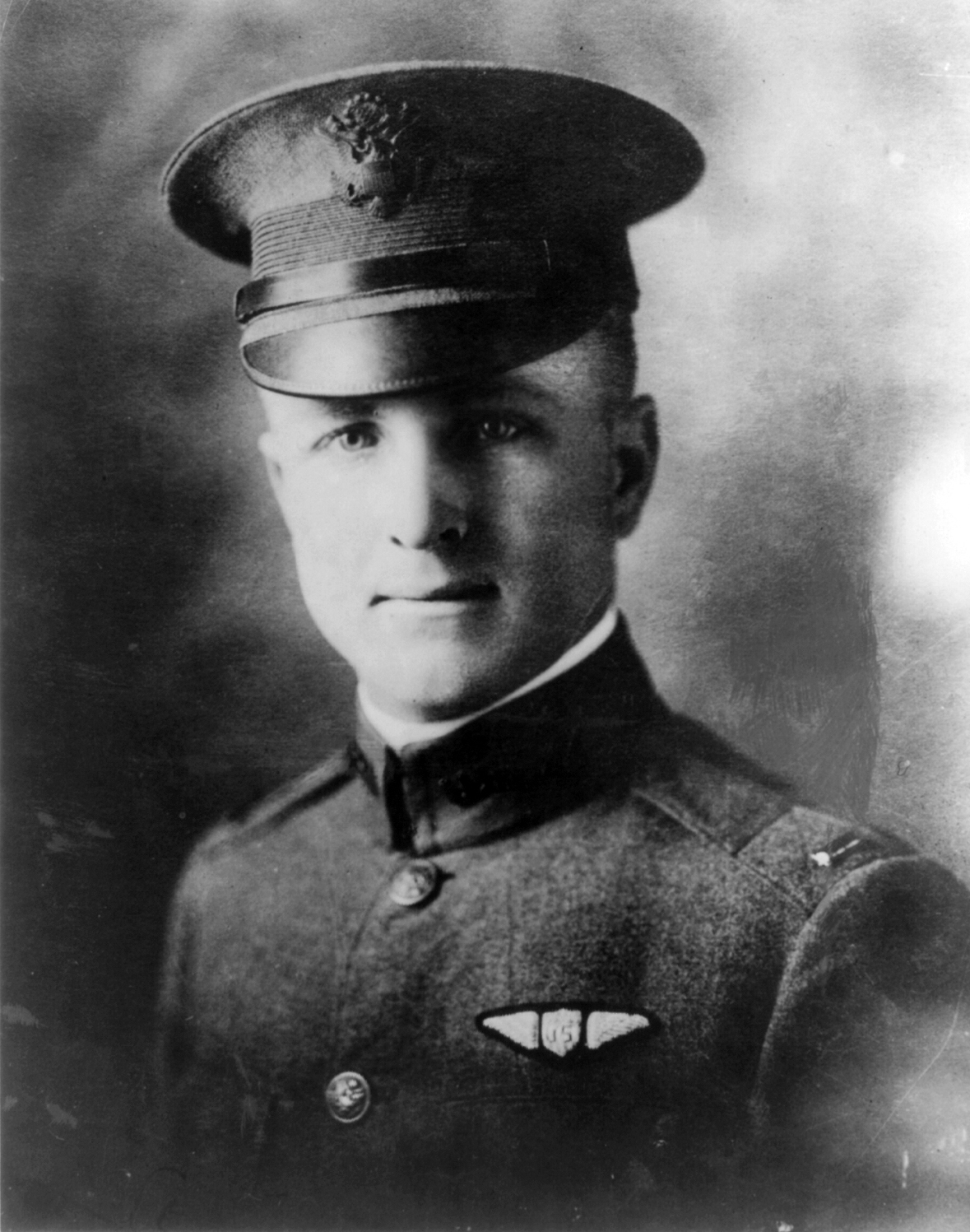
- Frank Luke Jr.
- Born: May 19, 1897; Phoenix, Arizona Territory
- Died: September 29, 1918 (aged 21); Murvaux, France
- Burial place: Meuse-Argonne American Cemetery and Memorial
- Military career
- Allegiance: United States
- Branch: Air Service, United States Army
- Service years: 1917–1918
- Rank: Second Lieutenant (posthumously promoted to First Lieutenant)
- Nickname: "Arizona Balloon Buster"
- Conflicts: World War I: Meuse-Argonne Offensive †
- Awards: Medal of Honor; Distinguished Service Cross (2); War Merit Cross (Italian)

Frank Luke Jr. (May 19, 1897 – September 29, 1918) was an American fighter ace credited with 19 aerial victories, ranking him second among United States Army Air Service (USAAS) pilots during World War I, after Eddie Rickenbacker. Luke was the first airman to receive the Medal of Honor and first USAAS ace in a day. Luke Air Force Base, Arizona, a United States Air Force pilot training installation since World War II, is named in his honor.

== Early life ==
Luke was born May 19, 1897, in Phoenix, Arizona, after his father emigrated from Germany to the United States in 1874 and settled there. Frank was his family's fifth child, and had eight brothers and sisters. He grew up excelling in sports, working in copper mines, and participating in bare-knuckle boxing matches.

== World War I ==
Following the United States' entry into World War I in April 1917, Frank enlisted in the Aviation Section, U.S. Signal Corps on September 25, 1917, and received pilot training in Texas and California.

=== 27th Aero Squadron ===
After being commissioned a second lieutenant in March 1918, he deployed to France for further training, and in July was assigned to the 27th Aero Squadron. Stephen Skinner's book The Stand notes that he received a posthumous promotion to first lieutenant.

Because of his arrogance and occasional tendencies to fly alone and disobey orders, Luke was disliked by some of his peers and superiors. But the 27th was under standing orders to destroy German observation balloons. Because of this, Luke, along with his close friend Lieutenant Joseph Frank Wehner, continually volunteered to attack these important targets although they were heavily defended by anti-aircraft guns on the ground. The two pilots began a string of victories together, with Luke attacking the balloons and Wehner flying protective cover. Wehner was killed in action on September 18, 1918, by Georg von Hantelmann in a dogfight with Fokker D.VIIs, which were attacking Luke. Luke then shot down two of these D.VIIs, two balloons, and a Halberstadt; the last "credit" enabled Luke to achieve his 13th official kill—a Halberstadt C-type observation plane of Flieger Abteilung 36.

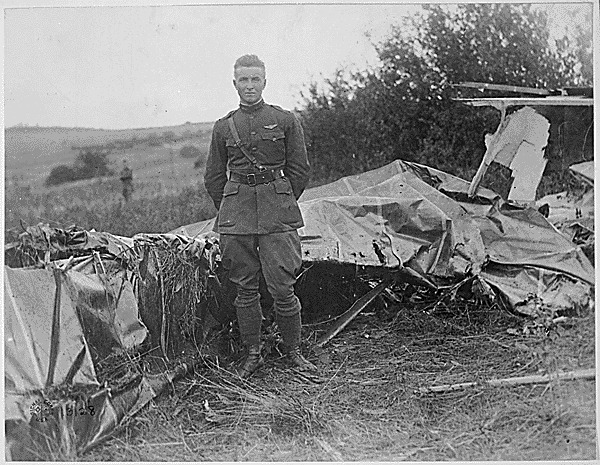
Luke with his 13th official kill September 18, 1918

Between September 12 and 29, Luke was credited with shooting down 14 German balloons and four airplanes: Luke achieved these 18 victories during just 10 sorties in eight days, a feat unsurpassed by any pilot in World War I.

=== Death ===
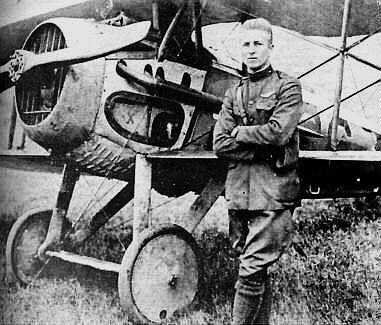
Lt. Frank Luke Jr. with his SPAD S.XIII on September 19, 1918.

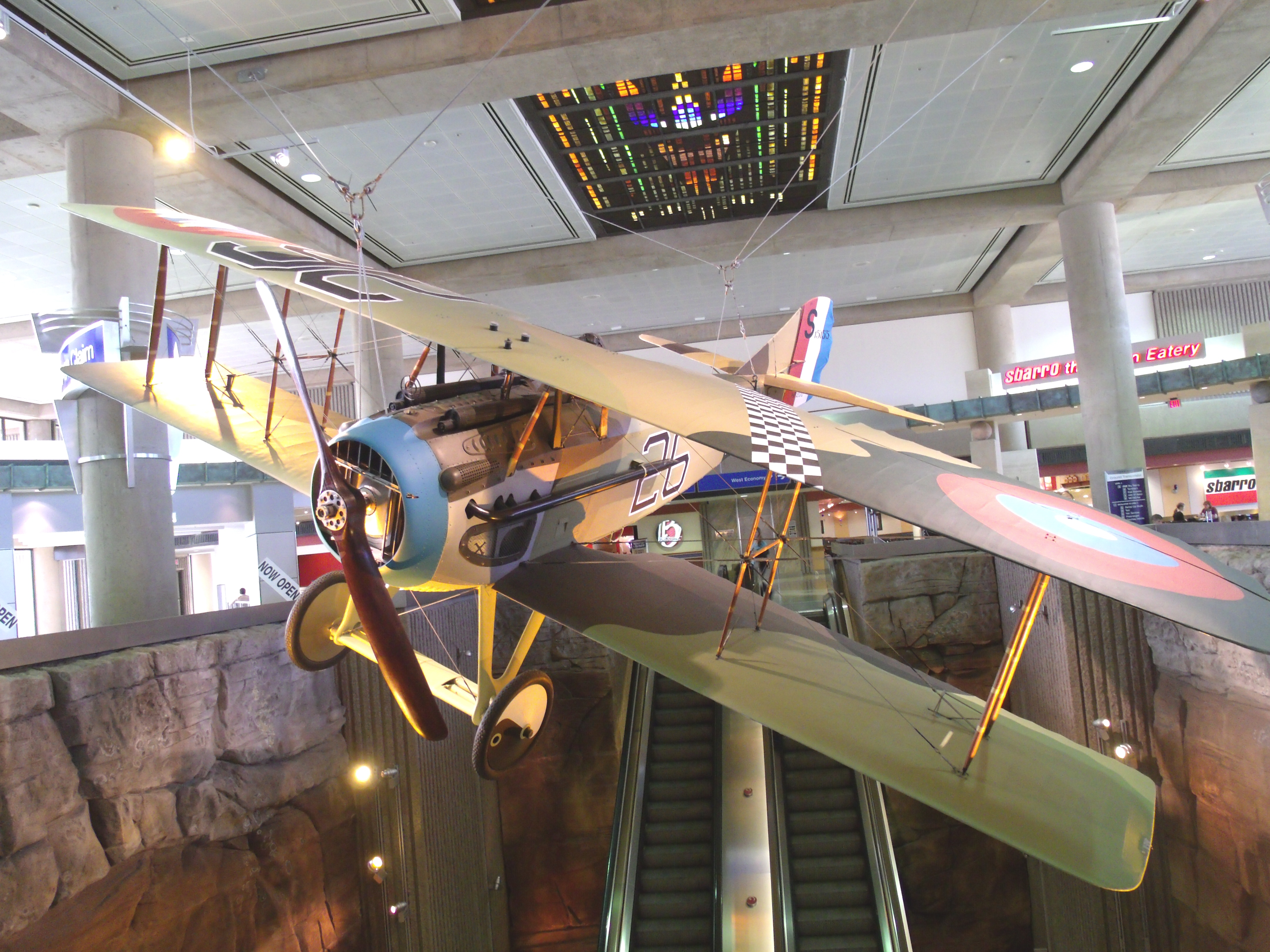
A SPAD XIII painted to represent the one flown by Frank Luke Jr. The plane is approximately 80% original parts from several aircraft. It is one of five surviving today and is on display in at the 44th Street Sky Train Station of Phoenix's Sky Harbor Airport (Shown in its previous location in Terminal 3 in the image).

Luke's final flight took place during the first phase of the Meuse-Argonne Offensive. On September 28, 1918, after achieving his 14th and 15th victories, he landed his SPAD XIII at the French aerodrome at Cicognes where he spent the night, claiming engine trouble. When he returned to the 1st Pursuit Group's base at Rembercourt the next day, he was confronted by Captain Alfred A. Grant, his squadron's commanding officer. Despite being under threat of arrest by Grant for absence without leave, Luke took off without authorization and flew to a forward airbase at Verdun, where his sympathetic group commander, Major Hartney, canceled the arrest order and gave Luke tacit approval to continue his balloon hunting.

That evening Luke flew to the front to attack three balloons in the vicinity of Dun-sur-Meuse, six miles (9.7 km) behind the German lines. He first dropped a message to a nearby United States balloon company, alerting them to observe his imminent attacks. Luke shot down the enemy balloons, but was then severely wounded by a single machine gun bullet fired from a hilltop above him, a mile (1.6 km) east of the last balloon site he had attacked. Luke landed in a field just west of the small village of Murvaux—after strafing a group of German soldiers on the ground—near the Ruisseau de Bradon, a stream leading to the Meuse River. Although weakened by his wound, he made his way toward the stream, intending to reach the cover of its adjacent underbrush, but finally collapsed some 200 meters (220 yd) from his airplane. Approached by German infantry, Luke drew his Colt Model 1911 pistol and fired a few rounds at his attackers before dying. Reports that a day later his body was found with an empty gun and a bullet hole in his chest, with seven dead Germans in front of him were proven erroneous. According to author Skinner, the fatal bullet, fired from the hilltop machine gun position, had entered near Luke's right shoulder, passed through his body, and exited from his left side.

On September 30, 1918, the Germans buried Luke in the Murvaux cemetery, from where his body was retrieved two months later by American forces. His final resting place is the Meuse-Argonne American Cemetery and Memorial, located east of the village of Romagne-sous-Montfaucon.

After the United States Army obtained sworn testimony from French and American sources, Luke was awarded a posthumous Medal of Honor. The presentation was made to Frank Luke Sr., in Phoenix in May 1919. The family later donated the medal to the National Museum of the United States Air Force near Dayton, Ohio. The museum's small exhibit honoring Luke also contains his flying goggles, the gunsight from his last SPAD, documents written by Luke, and other personal items. The museum's Early Years Gallery displays a fully restored SPAD XIII of the type flown by Luke.

Eddie Rickenbacker said of Luke:

He was the most daring aviator and greatest fighter pilot of the entire war. His life is one of the brightest glories of our Air Service. He went on a rampage and shot down fourteen enemy aircraft, including ten balloons, in eight days. No other ace, even the dreaded Richthofen, had ever come close to that.

== Other aces ==
Luke is often cited as the second-ranking United States ace of World War I, but that statement ignores certain American pilots who flew with other air services. Luke was, however, second only to Rickenbacker among pilots serving only with the AEF. (It is noteworthy that Luke's time on the front was comparatively quite short, and 17 of Luke's 18 victories were officially recorded as destroyed, versus only 11 of Rickenbacker's 26.) Americans flying with Britain's Royal Flying Corps (or Royal Air Force from April 1918) who exceeded Luke's score were Frederick W. Gillet (20 claims, all destroyed); Harold Albert Kullberg (19 confirmed) and Wilfred Beaver (19 claims, 12 destroyed). Tied with Luke at 18 was William C. Lambert.

== Honors and awards ==
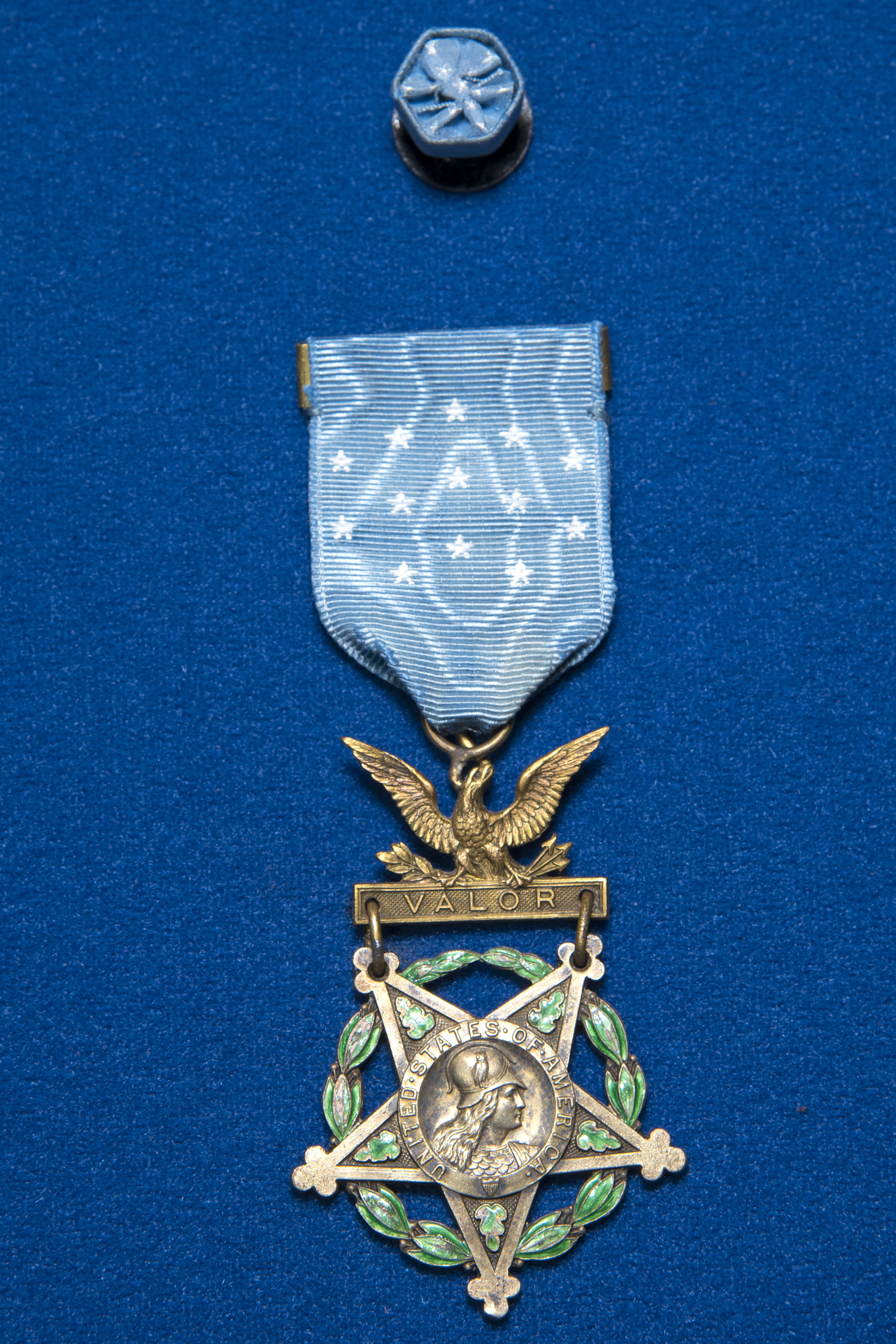
Frank Luke Jr. Medal of Honor on display in the Early Years Gallery at the National Museum of the United States Air Force.

=== Medal of Honor citation ===
Rank and Organization: Second Lieutenant, 27th Aero Squadron, 1st Pursuit Group. Place and Date: Near Murvaux, France, September 29, 1918. Entered Service At Phoenix, Ariz. Born: May 19, 1897, Phoenix, Ariz. G. O. No.: 59, W.D., 1919.

Citation:

After having previously destroyed a number of enemy aircraft within 17 days he voluntarily started on a patrol after German observation balloons. Though pursued by 8 German planes which were protecting the enemy balloon line, he unhesitatingly attacked and shot down in flames 3 German balloons, being himself under heavy fire from ground batteries and the hostile planes. Severely wounded, he descended to within 50 meters of the ground and flying at this low altitude near the town of Murvaux opened fire upon enemy troops, killing 6 and wounding as many more. Forced to make a landing and surrounded on all sides by the enemy, who called upon him to surrender, he drew his automatic pistol and defended himself gallantly until he fell dead from a wound in the chest.

The citation contained errors attributable to confused accounts from French witnesses to Luke's final flight, and to a staff officer's re-write of the original write-up, which emphasized the numerous high-risk missions he flew between September 12 and 29. Reports that he was intercepted by German fighters, strafed enemy troops before his forced landing; and was "surrounded on all sides" were literal misinterpretations of French testimony and became part of the mythology that grew up around the event.

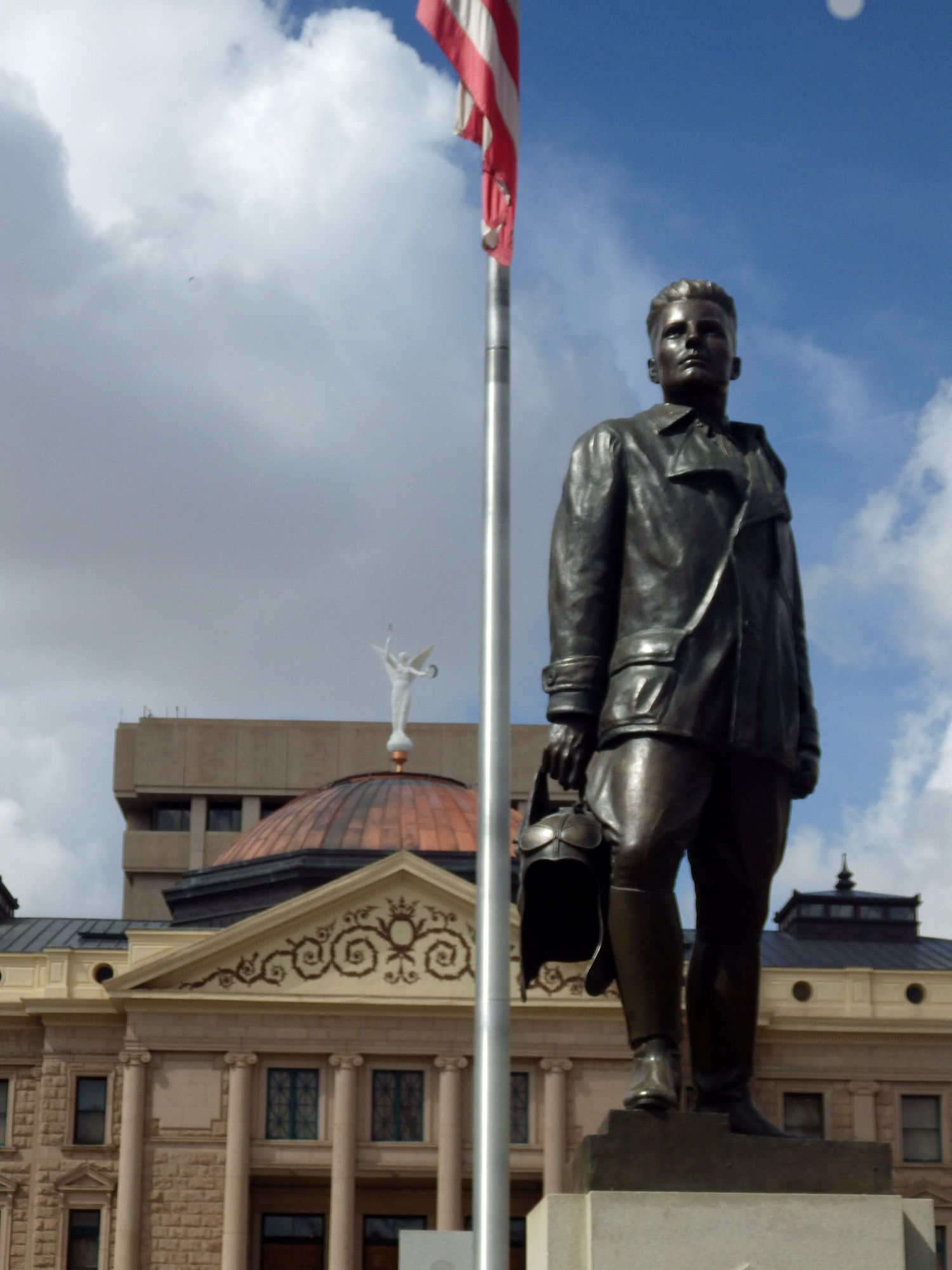
Luke statue, Phoenix, Arizona, Roger Noble Burnham, sculptor, 1930

=== First Distinguished Service Cross ===
Citation:

The President of the United States of America, authorized by Act of Congress, July 9, 1918, takes pride in presenting the Distinguished Service Cross (Posthumously) to Second Lieutenant (Air Service) Frank Luke Jr., United States Army Air Service, for extraordinary heroism in action while serving with 27th Aero Squadron, 1st Pursuit Group, U.S. Army Air Service, A.E.F., near St. Mihiel, France, September 12 to 15, 1918. Lieutenant Luke, by skill, determination, and bravery, and in the face of heavy enemy fire, successfully destroyed eight enemy observation balloons in four days.

=== Second Distinguished Service Cross ===
Citation:

The President of the United States of America, authorized by Act of Congress, July 9, 1918, takes pride in presenting a Bronze Oak Leaf Cluster in lieu of a Second Award of the Distinguished Service Cross (Posthumously) to Second Lieutenant (Air Service) Frank Luke Jr., United States Army Air Service, for extraordinary heroism in action while serving with 27th Aero Squadron, 1st Pursuit Group, U.S. Army Air Service, A.E.F., near Etain, France, 18 September 1918. Immediately after destroying two enemy observation balloons, Lieutenant Luke was attacked by a large formation of German planes, Fokker type. He turned to attack two, which were directly behind him and shot them down. Sighting an enemy biplane, although his gasoline was nearly gone, he attacked and destroyed this machine also.

=== Other honors ===
- Luke Air Force Base, located west of Phoenix, Arizona, was named after Luke.
- Memorial Statue by Roger Noble Burnham on the grounds of the State Capitol in Phoenix, Arizona.
- Memorial to Frank Luke and other members of the Phoenix Union High School Class of 1918, in front of the old Phoenix Union High School Building, Phoenix, Arizona.
- From 1919 to 1932, Luke Field, Territory of Hawaii, was named after Luke.
- Lukeville, Arizona, on the U.S. border is named after Luke.
- In 1975, Luke was inducted into the National Aviation Hall of Fame in Dayton, Ohio.
- Frank Luke was named the Class Exemplar of the United States Air Force Academy's class of 2010.
- In the 2006 movie Flyboys, James Franco's leading character Blaine Rawlings is inspired by Frank Luke.
- Frank Luke Street near Addison Airport in Addison, Texas, is named after Luke.
- In the 2023 Chinese balloon incident, the military aircraft that shot down the balloon were call-signed "FRANK01" and "FRANK02," in honor of Luke's reputation as a balloon-buster.

== See also ==
- Luke Field (disambiguation)
- List of Medal of Honor recipients for World War I
- List of World War I flying aces from the United States

== Bibliography ==
- Franks, Norman (2001). American Aces of World War 1. Osprey Aircraft of the Aces. Oxford: Osprey Publishing. ISBN 1-85532-961-1.
- King, Tim. "The Frank Luke Jr. Documentary".
- "Lieutenant Frank Luke Jr". Air Force Link. United States Air Force.
- Lloyd, Keith Warren (2015). Above and Beyond: The Incredible Story of Frank Luke Jr., Arizona's Medal of Honor Flying Ace of the First World War. CreateSpace Publishing. ISBN 978-1507727270.
- "Medal of Honor recipients". Airman Airforce Heritage. United States Air Force. Archived from the original on July 14, 2006.
- Pardoe, Blaine (2008). Terror of The Autumn Skies: The True Story of Frank Luke, America's Rogue Ace of World War I. New York.
- Skinner, Stephen. The Stand: The Final Flight of Lt. Frank Luke Jr. Schiffer Military History Books.
