= Luke Field =

Luke Field may refer to either of two United States military facilities:

- Luke Air Force Base, Arizona
- Luke Field, Ford Island, Hawaii

== See also ==
- Frank Luke (1897–1918), American fighter ace
