= Ella Ferris Pell =

American painter

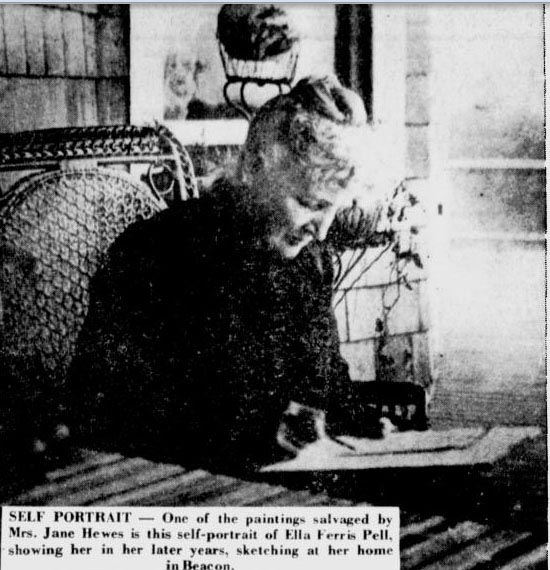
- Ella Ferris Pell, Self-portrait
- Born: January 18, 1846; St. Louis, Missouri, US
- Died: 1922 (aged 75–76); Beacon, New York
- Resting place: Fishkill Rural Cemetery
- Education: Design School for Women at Cooper Union
- Known for: Painter, sculptor and illustrator
- Movement: Orientalist

Ella Ferris Pell (January 18, 1846 – 1922) was an American painter, sculptor, and illustrator. She was the niece of William Ferris Pell, who bought the ruins of Fort Ticonderoga in 1820. She was born in St. Louis, Missouri, and trained as an artist with William Rimmer at Cooper Union School of Design for Women in New York City, graduating in 1870.

== Life and career ==
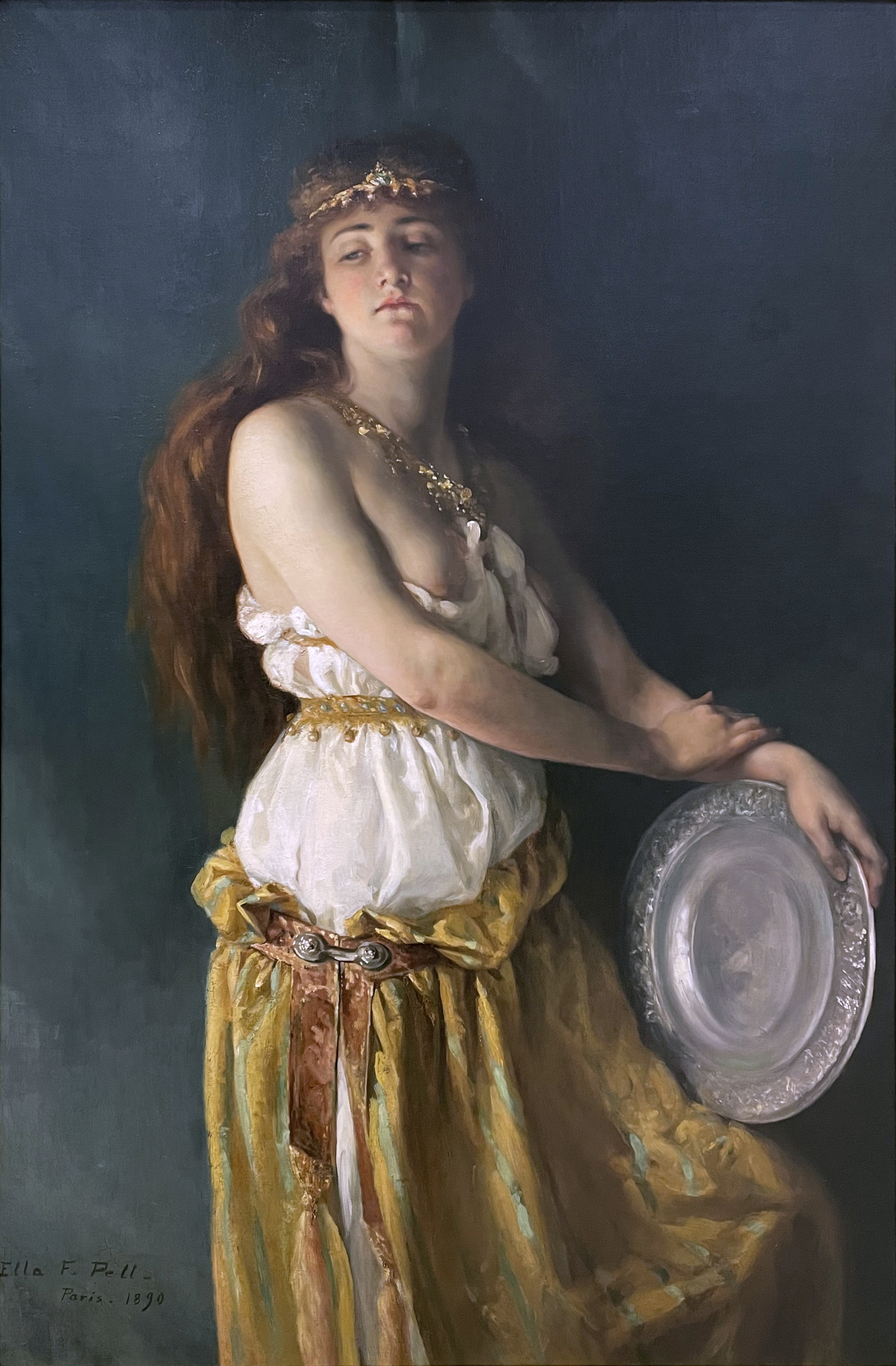
Salomé, oil on canvas by Ella Ferris Pell (1890)

According to Who Was Who in America, Pell was born in St. Louis. Claiborne Pell believed that she was a great-niece of his great-great-grandfather, William Ferris Pell, and she was also related to the Folger family.

She studied at the Design School for Women at Cooper Union under William Rimmer, graduating in 1870 and creating a sculpture of Puck which won praise from the New York Evening Post. An 1872 mention in the Daily Evening Transcript indicates that she was summering in Vermont at Bread Loaf Mountain, and describes her as a "sculptress". She and her sister and brother-in-law, Evelyn and Charles H. Todd, soon traveled to Europe, North Africa, and the Near East, a trip during which she painted constantly and illustrated a manuscript by Charles Todd on biblical subjects. By the 1880s she was living in New York City, exhibiting at the National Academy of Design. 1889 and 1890 found her showing at the Paris Salon, listing her teachers as Jean-Paul Laurens, Jacques Fernand Humbert, and Gaston Casimir Saint-Pierre. By later in the 1890s she was living in New York City, creating work for reproduction by Louis Prang and illustrating books, including Through the Invisible by Paul Tyner. She also exhibited work as a medalist. She continued summering in the Catskills with her family, and gave an address in Fishkill-on-the-Hudson, New York when exhibiting. She served at various times as the vice-president of the Ladies' Art Association and as president of the Liberal Art League, both in New York City.

Pell died in Beacon, New York, a year after her sister, and was buried near the latter in an unmarked grave in the Fishkill Rural Cemetery. Fifty-eight paintings were deposited at the Museum of Fort Ticonderoga along with drawings, diaries, and other memorabilia. Another painting is in the Columbus Museum of Art. As of 1990 none of her sculpture, including an 1872 depiction of Cordelia with Lear and a heroic statue of Andromeda, was known to have survived.

Pell's Salome of 1890, which was shown at the Salon, was included in the inaugural exhibition of the National Museum of Women in the Arts, American Women Artists 1830–1930, in 1987.

== See also ==
- List of Orientalist artists
- Orientalism
