= Murvaux =

- Commune
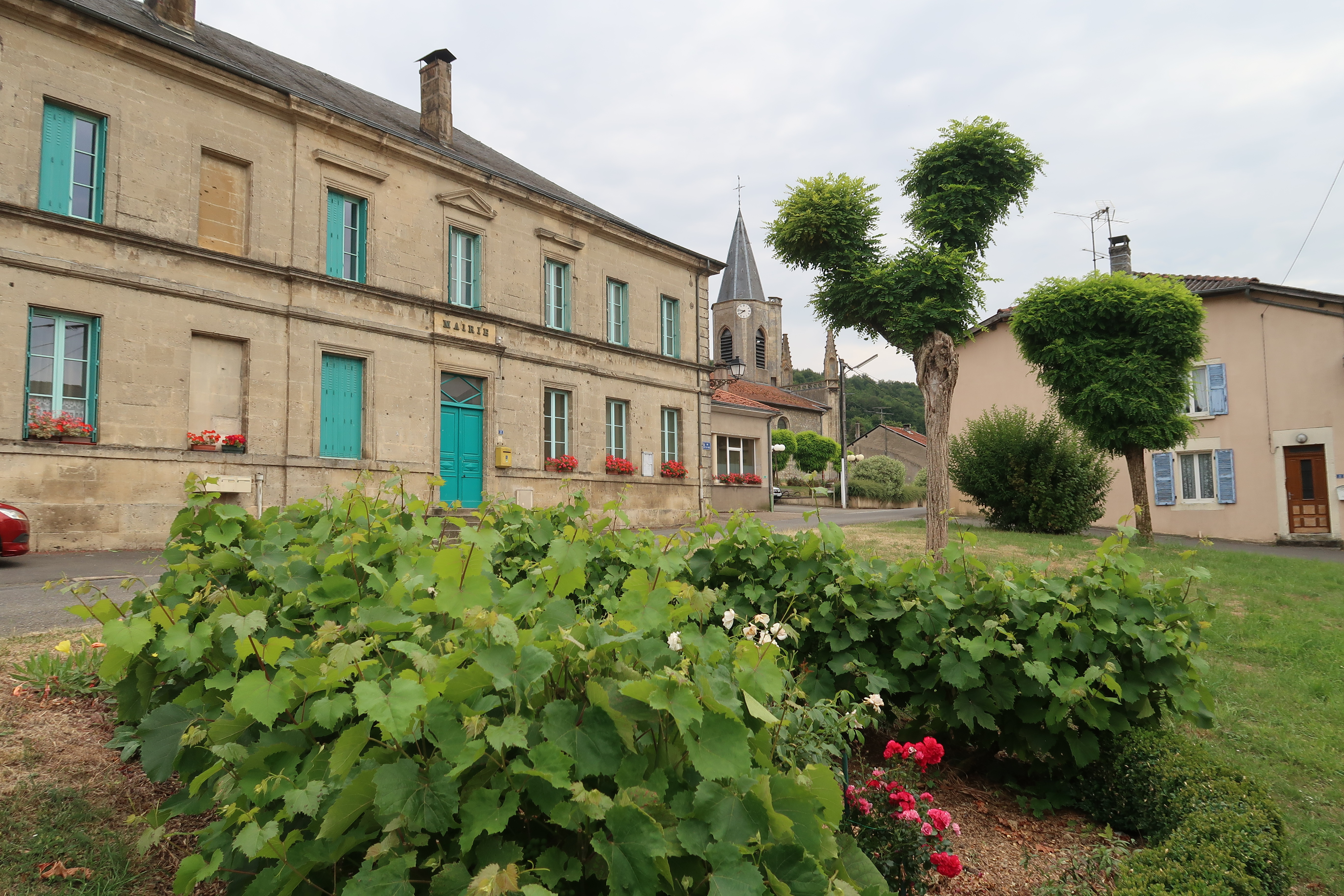
- Town hall

- Coat of arms
- Location of Murvaux
- Location within France Location within Grand Est
- Coordinates: 49°23′34″N 5°14′48″E
- Country: France
- Region: Grand Est
- Department: Meuse
- Arrondissement: Verdun
- Canton: Stenay
- Intercommunality: CC du Pays de Stenay et du Val Dunois

Government
  - Mayor (2020–2026): Jean-Luc Bridet
- Area^{1}: 14.21 km^{2} (5.49 sq mi)
- Elevation: 202 m (663 ft)
- Highest elevation: 357 m (1,171 ft)
- Lowest elevation: 189 m (620 ft)
- Population (2023): 139
  - Density: 9.78/km^{2} (25.3/sq mi)
- Time zone: UTC+01:00 (CET)
  - Summer (DST): UTC+02:00 (CEST)
- INSEE/Postal code: 55365 /55110
- ^{1} French Land Register data, which excludes lakes, ponds, glaciers > 1 km^{2} (0.386 sq mi or 247 acres) and river estuaries.

Murvaux (French pronunciation: [myʁvo]) is a commune in the Meuse department in Grand Est in north-eastern France.

After being mortally wounded, American World War I ace Frank Luke landed in a field in Murvaux before dying of his wounds.

== See also ==
- Communes of the Meuse department
