= Caroline Hunt Rimmer =

American illustrator, sculptor and teacher

Caroline Hunt Rimmer (October 10, 1851–1918) was an American illustrator, sculptor and teacher. She was active in Belmont and Boston, Massachusetts.

== Biography ==
Caroline Hunt Rimmer was born in 1851 in Randolph, Massachusetts, the daughter of Mary H. C. Rimmer and William Rimmer. She studied art with her father.

She wrote Figure Drawing for Children, originally published in 1893, republished as recently as 2013.

Rimmer's sculpture, Mermaid is in Boston's Museum of Fine Arts collection.

She died in Boston, Massachusetts.
