= Statue of Alexander Hamilton (Boston) =

Statue in Boston, Massachusetts, U.S.

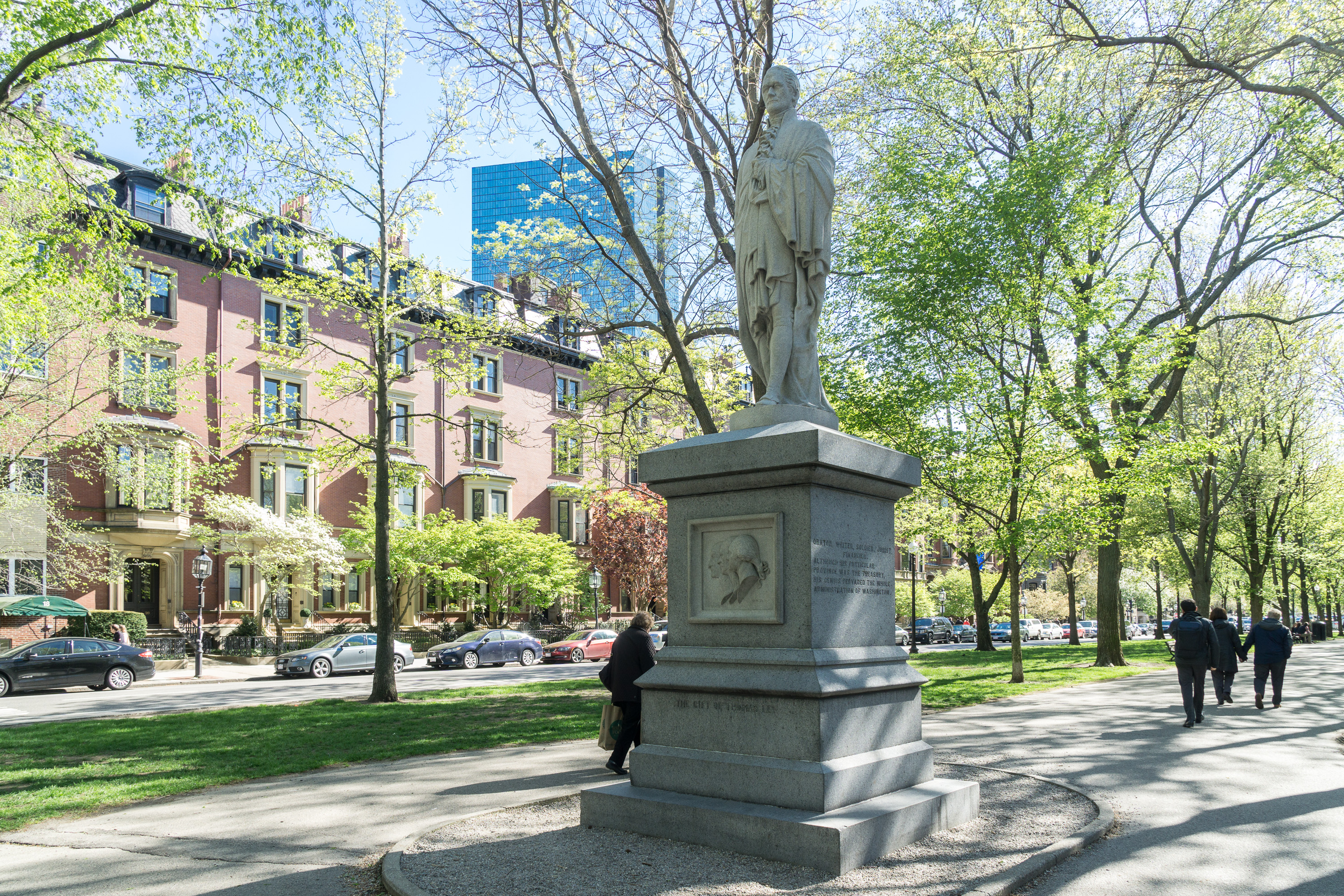
- The statue in 2017
- Artist: William Rimmer
- Medium: Granite sculpture
- Subject: Alexander Hamilton
- Location: Boston, Massachusetts, U.S.; 42°21′12.4″N 71°4′20.8″W

A statue of Alexander Hamilton by William Rimmer is installed along Commonwealth Avenue, between Arlington and Berkeley Streets, in Boston, Massachusetts, United States.

== Description ==
The 1864–1865 granite statue measures approximately 10 ft. x 3 ft. 4 in. x 3 ft. 4 in., and rests on a granite base measuring 8 ft. 5 in. x 5 ft. 4 in. x 5 ft. 4 in. The base has three relief portrait busts depicting Hamilton, John Jay, and George Washington.

== History ==
The artwork was surveyed by the Smithsonian Institution's "Save Outdoor Sculpture!" program in 1993.

== Reception ==
The statue was widely regarded as a failure by nineteenth-century commentators. The critic George B. Woods stated that Hamilton appeared to be "swathed like an infant or a mummy." William H. Downes wrote that it "suggested a snow image which had partly melted." Lincoln Kirstein, writing in 1961, offered a more favorable assessment, commenting that "the mass and its drapery are powerfully suggestive, anticipating Rodin's Balzac in the looming treatment of the rising form."
