= United States military beret flash =

Wear of the beret flash in the US military

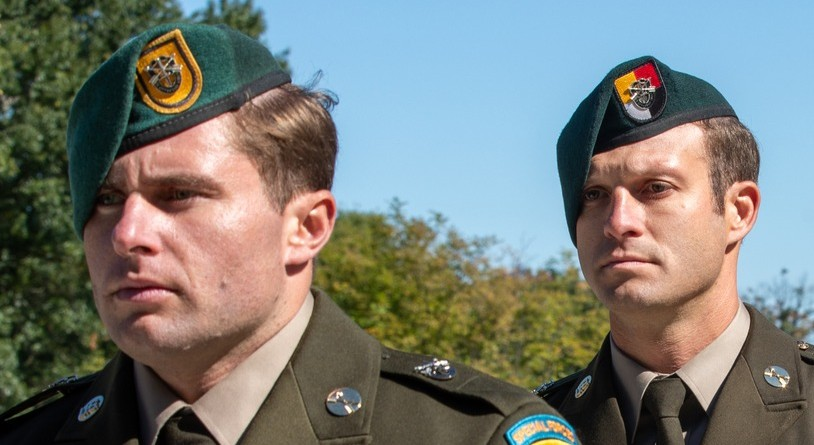
Army NCOs wearing rifle–green berets with organizational beret flashes from (right to left) 1st and 3rd Special Forces Groups bearing the 1st Special Forces Regiment DUI

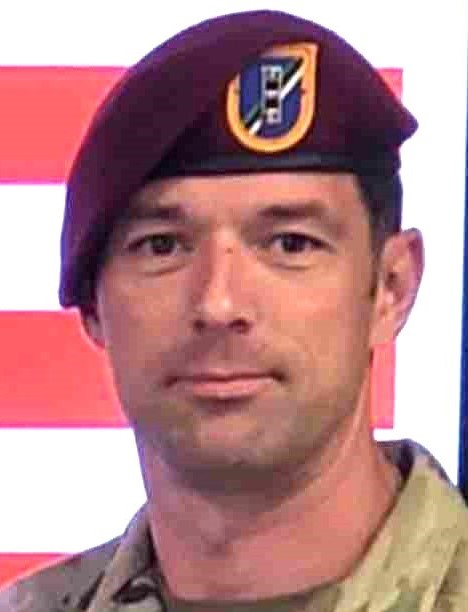
An Army warrant officer wearing maroon beret with 1st Battalion, 160th Special Operations Aviation Regiment Beret Flash bearing polished metal Chief Warrant Officer Two rank insignia

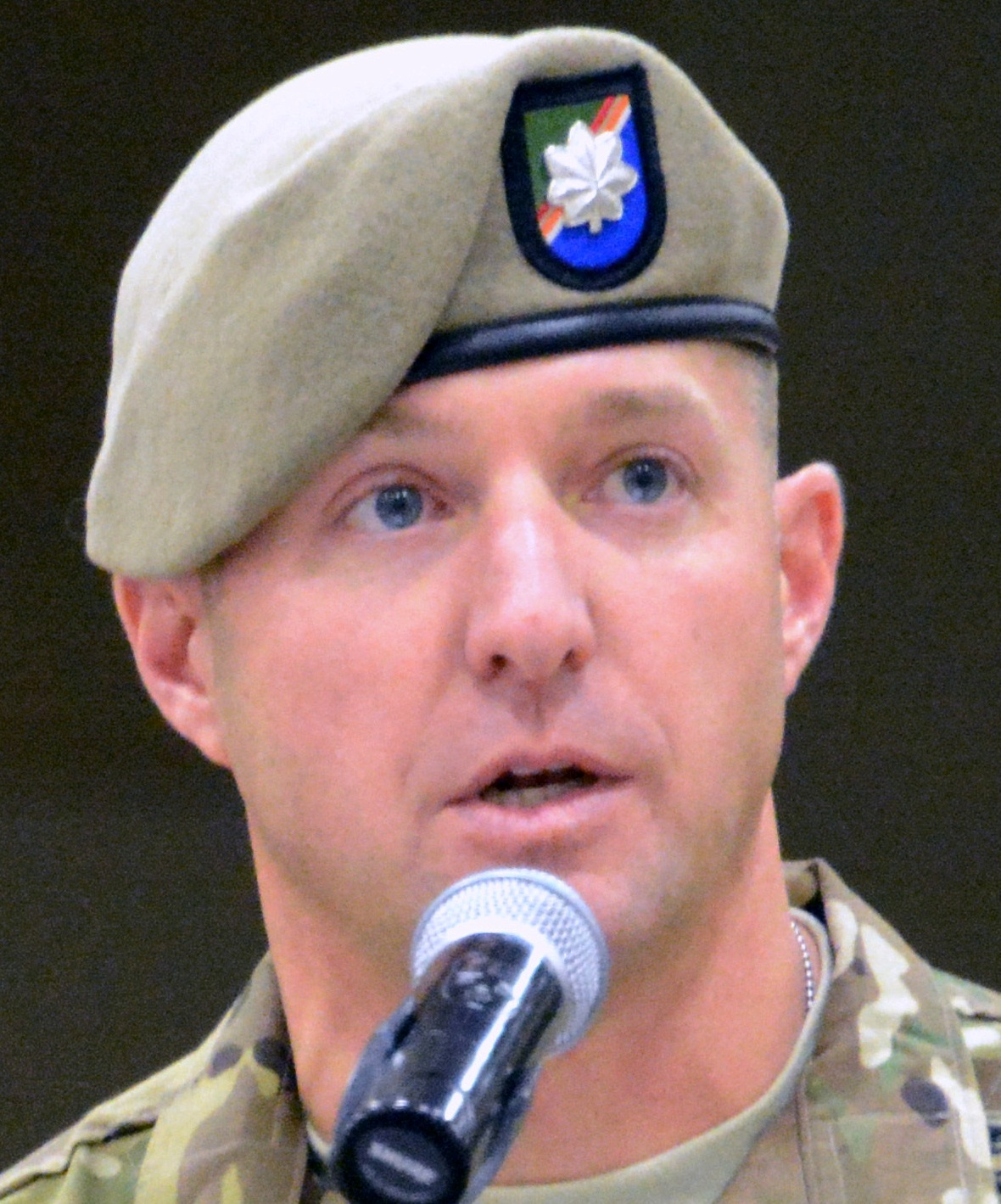
An Army officer wearing tan beret with 75th Ranger Regiment Beret Flash bearing polished metal lieutenant colonel rank insignia

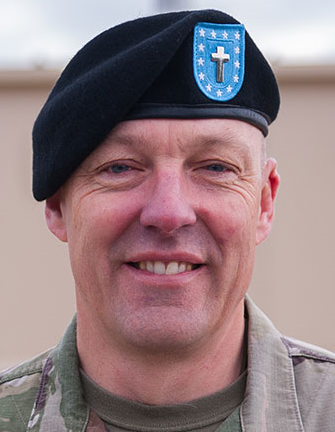
An Army officer wearing black beret with Department of the Army Beret Flash bearing polished medal Chaplain (Christianity) Branch Insignia

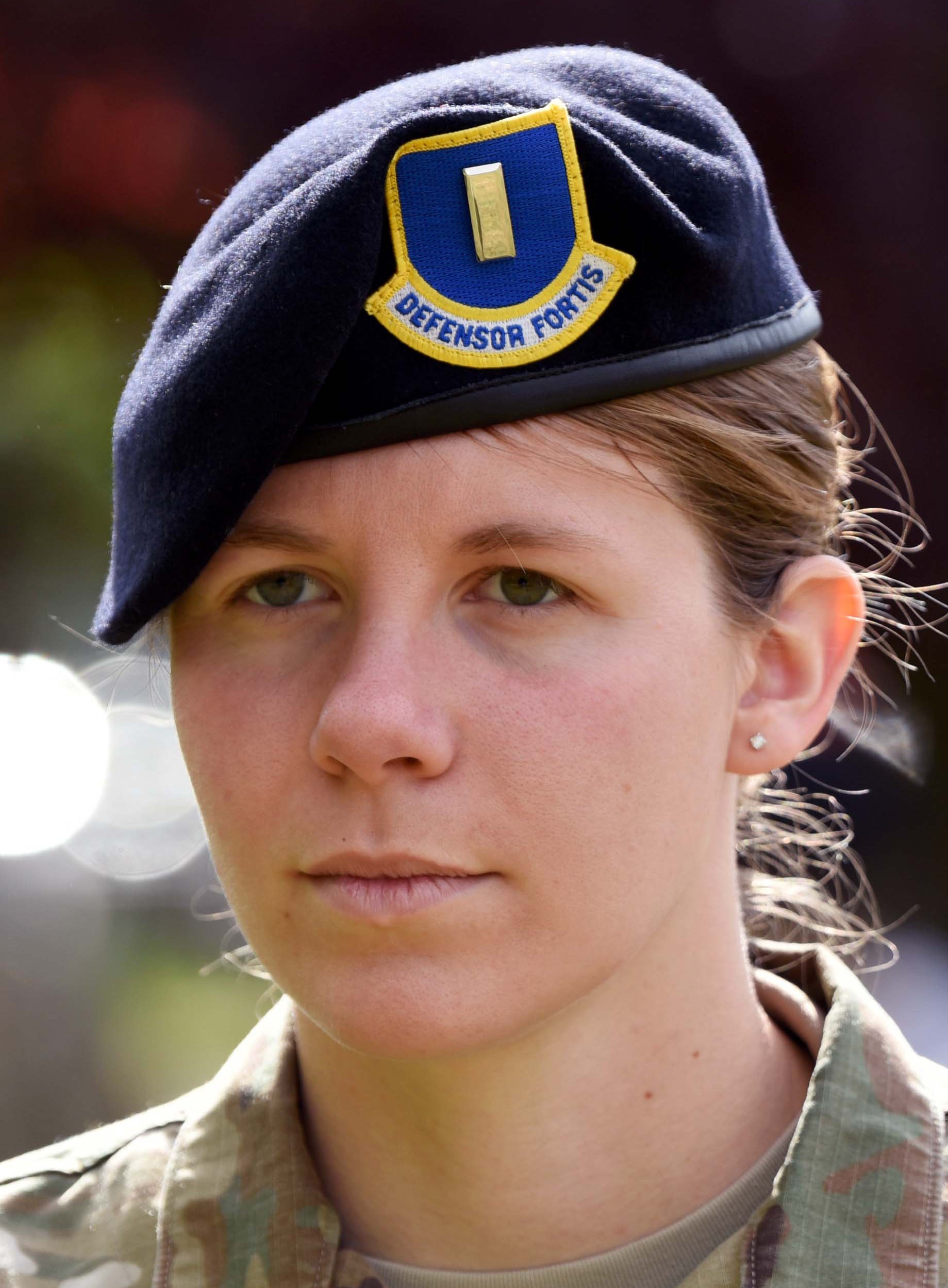
An Air Force officer wearing navy-blue beret with Security Forces Officer Beret Flash bearing polished medal second lieutenant rank insignia

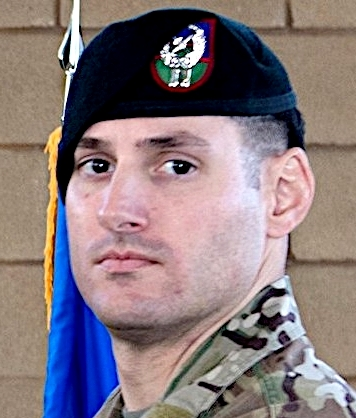
An Air Force officer wearing black beret with TACP Beret Flash and Crest bearing miniature polished metal captain rank insignia

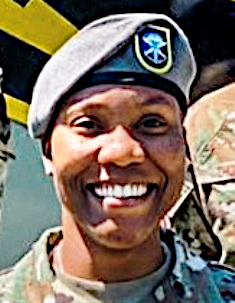
An Air Force airman wearing gray beret with Combat Weather Team Beret Flash and Crest

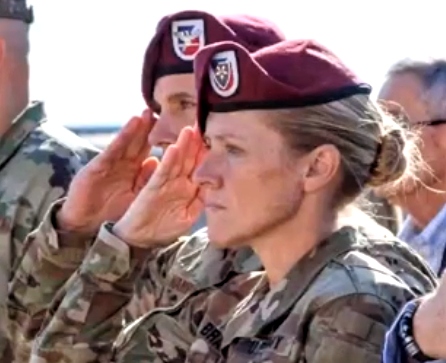
An Air Force officer and Army NCO wearing maroon berets with Joint Communications Support Element Beret Flash, the officer affixing his polished metal colonel rank insignia and the NCO her unit's DUI

In the United States (US) military, a beret flash is a shield-shaped embroidered cloth that is typically 2.25 in (5.72 cm) tall and 1.875 in (4.76 cm) wide with a semi–circular base that is attached to a stiffener backing of a military beret. These flashes—a British English word for a colorful cloth patch attached to military headgear made popular in US military lexicon by Lieutenant General William P. Yarborough (Ret.)—are worn over the left eye with the excess cloth of the beret shaped, folded, and pulled over the right ear giving it a distinctive appearance.

Army soldiers and non-commissioned officers (NCOs) affix their distinctive unit insignia (DUI), regimental distinctive insignia (when no DUI is authorized), Sergeant Major of the Army collar insignia (when assigned), or Senior Enlisted Advisor to the Chairman of the Joint Chiefs of Staff collar insignia (when assigned) to the center of their beret flash. Army warrant officers and commissioned officers affix their polished metal rank insignia to the center of their beret flash while general officer's may choose to affix regular or miniature polished metal rank insignia. To better distinguish them from other Army personnel, Army chaplains affix their polished metal branch insignia to the center of their beret flash. Air Force commissioned officers who are in the security forces or serving as weather parachutists wear their beret flash in the same manner as the Army while Tactical Air Control Party (TACP) officers attach a miniature version of their polished metal rank insignia below the TACP Crest on the TACP Beret Flash. Air Force airmen and NCOs with the security forces only wear their unique beret flash while those assigned as weather parachutists or are TACPs wear their Army–style Combat Weather Team or TACP Beret Flash with a Combat Weather Team or TACP Crest, respectively. Joint beret flashes—such as those worn by the Joint Communications Support Element—are worn by all who are assigned, given their uniform regulations allow, and will wear them in the manner prescribed by the joint unit.

The design of all US Department of Defense (DoD) beret flashes are created and/or approved by The Institute of Heraldry (TIOH), within the US Department of the Army. When a requesting organization is entitled to have its own beret flash, the institute will conduct research into the requesting organization's heraldry, as well as design suggestions from the requesting organization, in the creation of a unit or specialty beret flash. Leveraging geometrical divisions, shapes, and colors a heraldic artist will create a design that will represent the history and mission of the requesting organization. Once the organization agrees upon a design, the institute will authorize the creation of the new beret flash and will establish manufacturing instructions for the companies authorized to produce heraldic materials for the DoD. The institute will also monitor the production of the new beret flash to ensure quality and accuracy of the design is maintained.

== History of the beret flash in the DoD ==
=== US Army ===
"The French Hat"—History of the beret in the US Army, from the perspective of the 82nd Airborne Division—(2017)

==== 1940s ====
First beret flash of the US Army

509th Parachute Infantry patch

World War II British airborne beret awarded to a 509th paratrooper whose service number is on the beret liner, bearing the 509th pocket patch as its beret flash with US Army parachutist badge.(c. 1943)

Throughout its history, Army units have adopted different headgear and headgear devices—such as various colored cords, colored stripes, and insignias—to identify specific units, the unique mission of a unit, and/or the unique role of a soldier. According to some historians, the first US use of a military beret device was a beret flash created by the 509th Parachute Infantry Battalion of World War II. The 509th trained with the British 1st Airborne Division and was made honorary members of the British airborne forces in 1943. This honor authorized the 509th to wear the British paratrooper's maroon beret. Some 509th paratroopers had a small hand–embroidered version of their battalion's pocket–patch created for use as their beret flash on their honorary berets. The design of the 509th's World War II pocket–patch and beret flash depicts a stylized figure of a paratrooper standing at an open aircraft door wearing a reserve parachute with an artistic rendering of the number "509" surrounding the paratrooper's head and the name Geronimo displayed at the base of the door all embroidered in gold on a black shield-shaped cloth with a semi–circular top.

==== 1960s ====
Special forces group recognition bar example

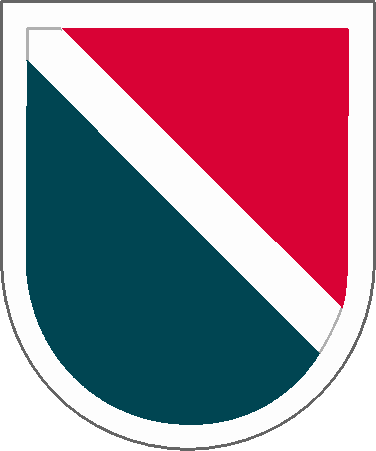
11th Special Forces Group Beret Flash

11th Special Forces Group Recognition Bar—note the similarity in design between the group's beret flash and recognition bar

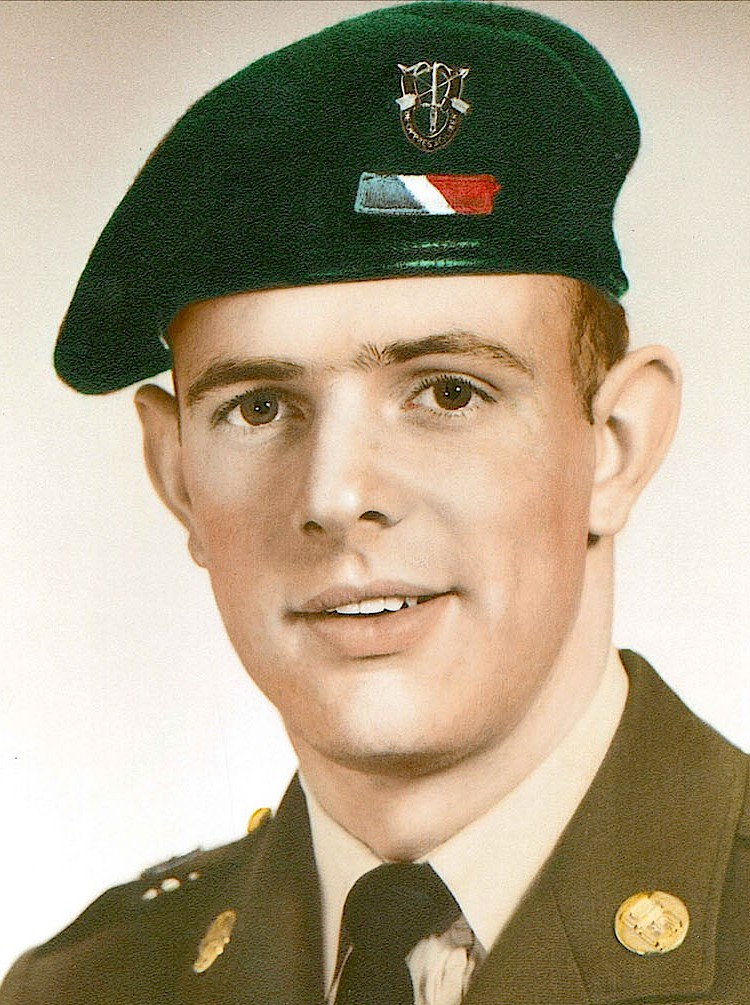
A medical corps paratrooper wearing rifle-green beret with 1st Special Forces Regiment DUI affixed above the 11th Special Forces Group recognition bar (c. 1967)

The official start of the Army's beret flashes began in 1961 with Department of the Army Message 578636 authorizing the establishment of organizational beret flashes for wear on the special forces' rifle–green beret. Championed and heavily influenced by Lieutenant General William P. Yarborough (Ret.)—creator of the US Army parachutist badge and airborne background trimming—the message described the beret flash as shield–shaped with a semi–circular base made of felt 2 in (51 mm) tall and 1.625 in (41 mm) wide using solid colors to represent each of the special forces groups of the era. The message also described who was authorized to wear the organizational beret flash stating that only special forces qualified paratroopers would be permitted to wear their special forces unit's organizational beret flash. These organizational beret flashes were to be worn centered over the left eye with either the 1st Special Forces Regiment DUI, polished metal officer rank insignia, or chaplain branch insignia positioned below their parachutist badge and centered on the beret flash. Later, the parachutist badge was removed and non–qualified soldiers assigned to a special forces unit wore a rectangular cloth beret flash, known as a recognition bar, 1.875 in (4.76 cm) long and 0.5 in (1.27 cm) wide color and pattern matched to their group's organizational beret flash. The recognition bar was worn below their 1st Special Force Regiment DUI, polished metal officer rank insignia, or chaplain branch insignia on the rifle–green beret.

==== 1970s ====
Various beret accoutrements began to appear in the 1960s and 1970s, particularly between 1973 and 1979 when the Department of the Army had its morale–enhancing order in effect and different colored berets began to be worn by numerous units and branches of the Army.

Historical photographs from the 1960s through the 1970s show soldiers assigned to reconnaissance, ranger, and armor units informally wearing black berets with various units affixing a wide variety of custom beret flashes that were worn over the left eye or left temple. In 1975, the Army formally authorized its ranger units to wear the black beret. If earned, some of these ranger units had their rangers affix their Ranger Tab to the top edge of their organizational beret flash along with their regiment or unit DUI, polished metal officer rank insignia, or chaplain branch insignia affixed to its center and worn over the left eye.

Vietnam Era reconnaissance unit example

2nd Battalion, 8th Cavalry Regiment, Recon. Platoon Beret Flash.

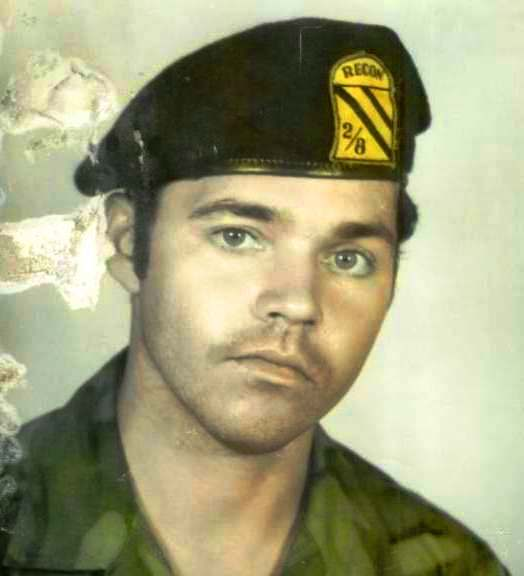
An infantryman with 1st Cavalry Division, 1st Brigade, 2nd Battalion, 8th Cavalry Regiment wearing black beret with his Reconnaissance Platoon's beret flash (1970)
Ranger unit example

Ranger Department Beret Flash

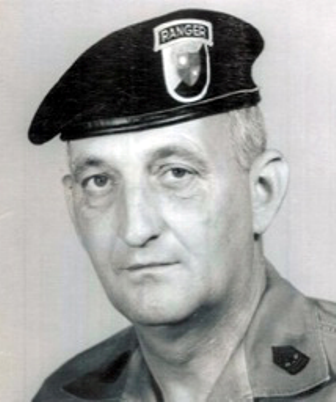
An infantry ranger NCO with the US Army Infantry School wearing black beret with Ranger Department Beret Flash bearing 75th Ranger Regiment DUI below his Ranger Tab (c. 1975)

Wearing of the black beret by armor units expanded in the 1970s with some adopting organizational beret flashes. For example, many US Army armor units stationed in West Germany, such as the 1st Armored Division, 2nd Armored Cavalry Regiment, and 11th Armored Cavalry Regiment, began wearing black berets in the 1970s with the armored cavalry regiments affixing maroon and white ovals for use as their beret flash. The oval beret flash was worn vertically on the black beret behind their DUI to the left of their metal rank insignia or chaplain branch insignia and positioned over the left temple. Another example is the Army's "triple capability" experiment with the 1st Cavalry Division that outfitted the division for armor, airmobile, and air cavalry warfare in 1971. The division decided that its soldiers should wear different colored berets to represent the capability they brought to the division: black for armor, light–blue for infantry, red for artillery, and kelly–green for support—later settling for black berets across all formations. As they became available, 1st Cavalry soldiers would affix a battalion or squadron specific organizational beret flash of various shapes, colors, and materials to their beret. Historical photographs show many 1st Cavalry soldiers wearing their berets in the same manner as US armored cavalry soldiers in West Germany. The use of black berets extended to training units as well, such as the US Army Training and Doctrine Command and its armor school. Historical photographs of the era show plastic triangles being worn on black berets of US Army Armor School cadre and were worn in the same manner as beret flashes are today.

Armored Cavalry Regiment example

Armored Cavalry Oval Beret Flash

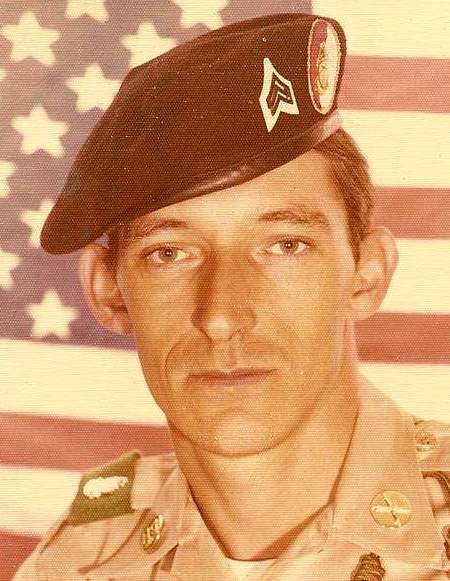
An artillery NCO with the 11th Armored Cavalry Regiment wearing black beret with subdued sergeant rank insignia next to the Armored Cavalry Oval bearing his regimental DUI (c. 1973–1974)
1st Cavalry Division example

1st Battalion, 12th Cavalry Regiment Beret Flash

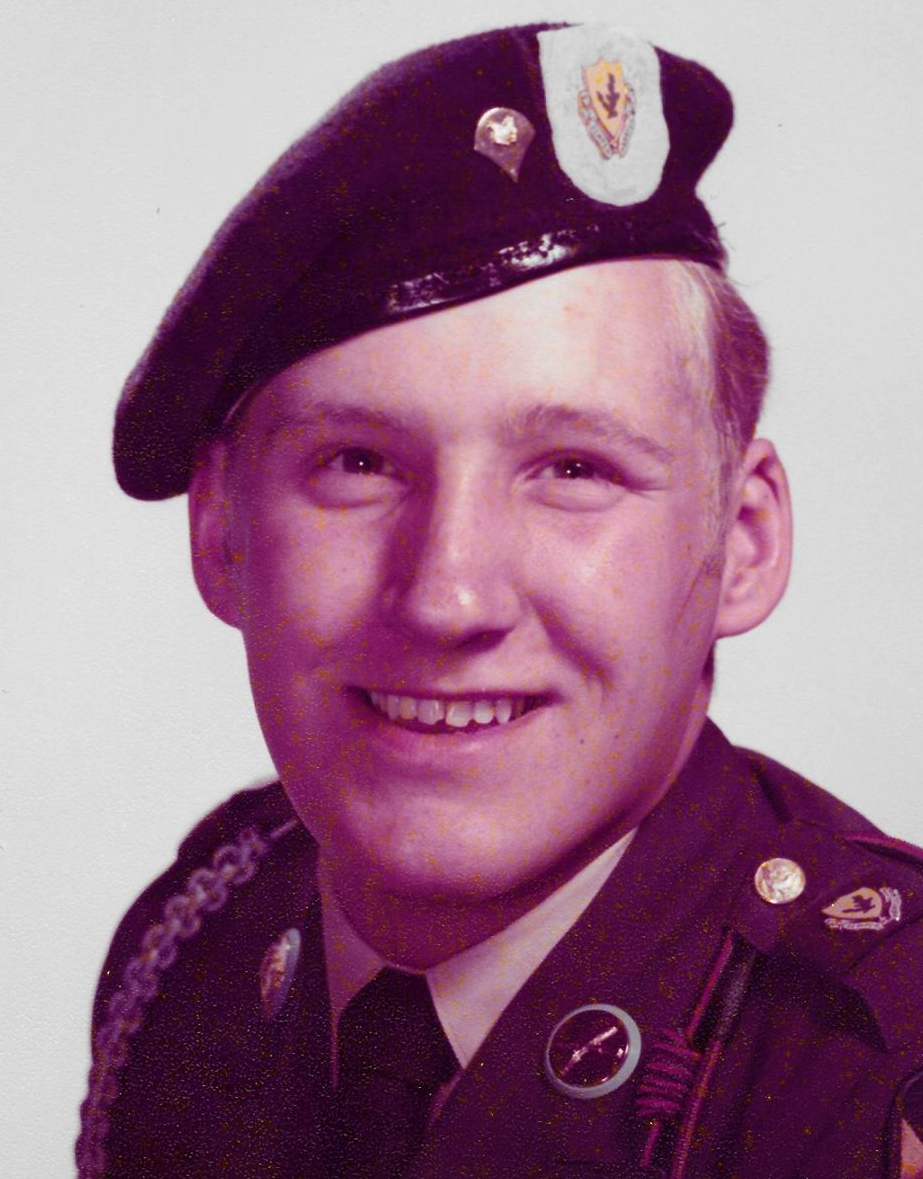
An infantryman with the 1st Cavalry Division wearing black beret with polished brass specialist four rank insignia next to the 1st Battalion, 12th Cavalry Regiment Beret Flash bearing the 12th Cavalry Regiment DUI (1976)
US Armor School example

US Army Armor School Instructor Flash (made of plastic)

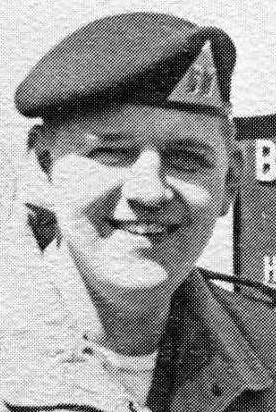
An armor officer with the US Army Training and Doctrine Command, US Army Armor School wearing black beret with Armor School Instructor Flash bearing polished metal captain rank insignia (1976)

In 1973, Army leaders authorized the wear of the maroon beret by airborne forces. Within a year or so, paratroopers of the 82nd Airborne Division began incorporating organizational beret flashes onto their maroon berets pattered after their unit's airborne background trimming. These organizational beret flashes, representing various units of the 82nd, were worn in the same manner as they are today. Similarly, in 1974 Army leaders authorized the 101st Airborne Division to wear a dark–blue beret when it was reorganized into an air assault division at Fort Campbell. Army articles and historical photographs of 101st soldiers show them wearing organizational beret flashes patterned after their unit's airborne background trimming and were affixed with either their polished metal rank insignia, DUI, or chaplain branch insignia centered on the beret flash and worn over the left eye. In 1976/77, 101st soldiers started to affix their Airmobile Badge—renamed Air Assault Badge in 1978—to their berets positioned over their left temple next to their beret flash. Other Fort Campbell units of the era also wore the dark–blue beret as well as red berets for headquarters command and light-green berets for military police, all with traditional organizational beret flashes that were worn in the same manner as they are today.

82nd Airborne Division example

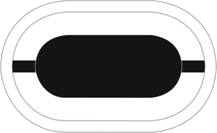
1st Battalion, 508th Infantry Regiment Airborne Background Trimming

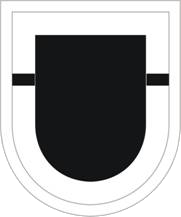
1st Battalion, 508th Infantry Regiment Beret Flash

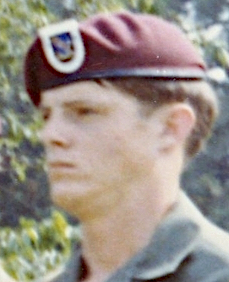
A paratrooper with the 82nd Airborne Division wearing maroon beret with 1st Battalion, 508th Infantry Regiment Beret Flash bearing his regimental DUI (1975)—note the similarities between the airborne background trimming and beret flash
101st Airborne Division example

326th Engineer Battalion Airborne Background Trimming

326th Engineer Battalion Beret Flash

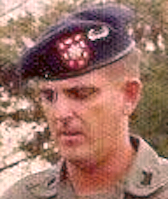
An engineer officer with the 101st Airborne Division wearing dark–blue beret with 326th Engineer Battalion Beret Flash bearing polished metal lieutenant colonel rank insignia and Airmobile Badge (1977)—note the similarities between the airborne background trimming and beret flash
Arctic–qualified soldier example

1st Battalion, 60th Infantry Regiment Beret Flash

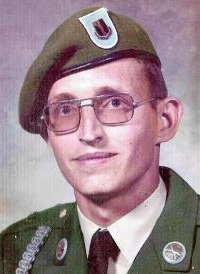
An arctic–qualified infantryman with the 172nd Infantry Brigade wearing olive–drab beret with 1st Battalion, 60th Infantry Regiment Beret Flash bearing his regimental DUI (c. 1970s)

Also during the 1970s, arctic–qualified soldiers of the 172nd Infantry Brigade wore locally authorized olive–drab berets with organizational beret flashes that were unique to each battalion, company, troop, or battery of the brigade and were worn in the same manner as they are today.

By 1979, the Army put a stop to the use of berets by conventional forces, leaving only special forces and ranger units the authority to wear berets.

==== 1980s and 90s ====
In 1980, the Army reversed part of its decision allowing airborne units to wear maroon berets, ranger units black berets and special forces units rifle–green berets. The Army's 1981 uniform regulation describes the wear of these berets with the only authorized accoutrements being organizational beret flashes or recognition bars with officer rank insignia, chaplain branch insignia, or DUI affixed.

The organizational beret flash did not become the norm across the Army until 1984 when the recognition bar was discontinued after the Special Forces Tab became authorized for wear by special forces qualified soldiers.

In 1993, the Chief of Staff of the Army, General Gordon R. Sullivan, approved a policy which restricted the wear of the rifle-green beret to special forces qualified soldiers only. Once implemented, all paratroopers assigned to a special forces unit wear their unit's organizational beret flash on either a rifle–green beret, if special forces qualified, or a maroon beret, for support paratroopers.

Example of modern-day wear of special forces organizational beret flashes

7th Special Forces Group Beret Flash

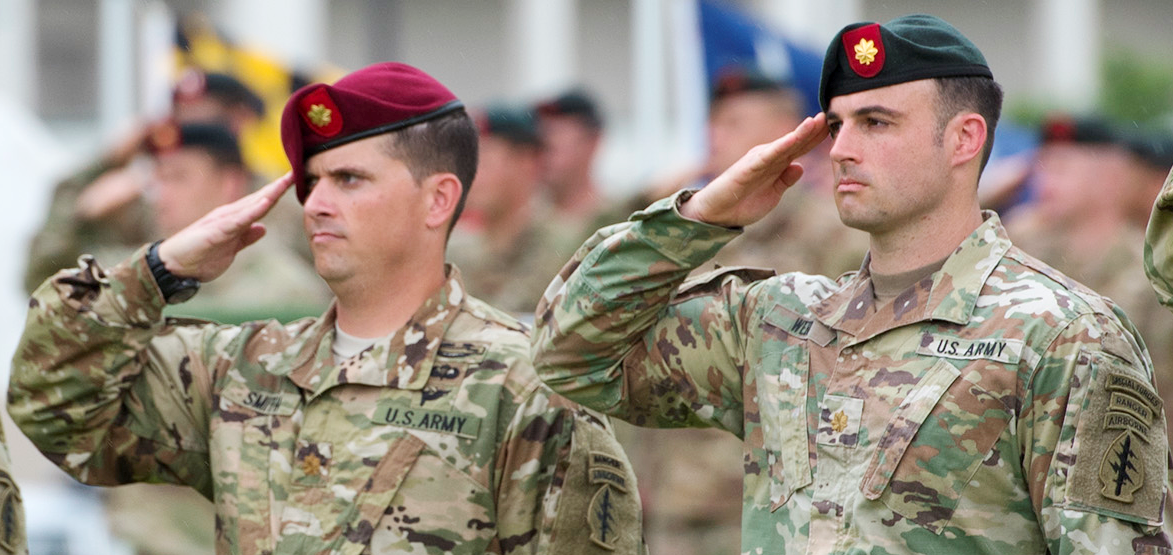
Two officers, one wearing a maroon beret and one rifle-green, with 7th Special Forces Group Beret Flashes and polished metal major rank insignia; the special forces qualified officer is identified by his rifle-green beret and Special Forces Tab (2017)

==== 2000–present ====
In 2000, the Chief of Staff of the Army, General Eric Shinseki, decided to make the black beret the standard headgear of the Army. General Shinseki also decided that a new Department of the Army Beret Flash be worn on the Army black beret. According to TIOH, the Department of the Army Beret Flash is designed to resemble the flag of the Commander-in-Chief of the Continental Army, General George Washington, that was flown at the siege of Yorktown during the American Revolutionary War. According to Department of the Army Pamphlet 670–1, the Department of the Army Beret Flash is to be worn by all units "unless authorization for another flash was granted before implementing the Army black beret as a standard Army headgear."

Department of the Army Beret Flash

Photograph of General Washington's Sun faded Commander–in–Chief flag (c. 1775-1783)

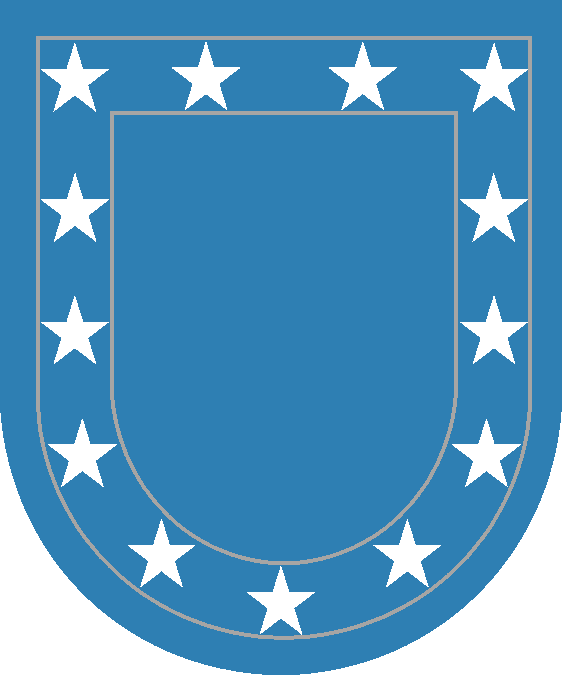
Department of the Army Beret Flash

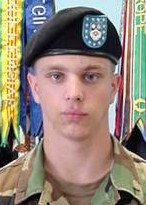
A soldier with 1st Battalion, 23rd Infantry Regiment wearing Army black beret with Department of the Army Beret Flash and his regimental DUI affixed during an Army Beret Donning Ceremony at Fort Lewis (c. 2001)
Example of the beret flash exception on the Army black beret

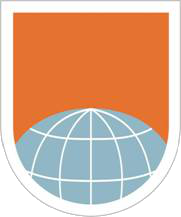
55th Signal Company Beret Flash

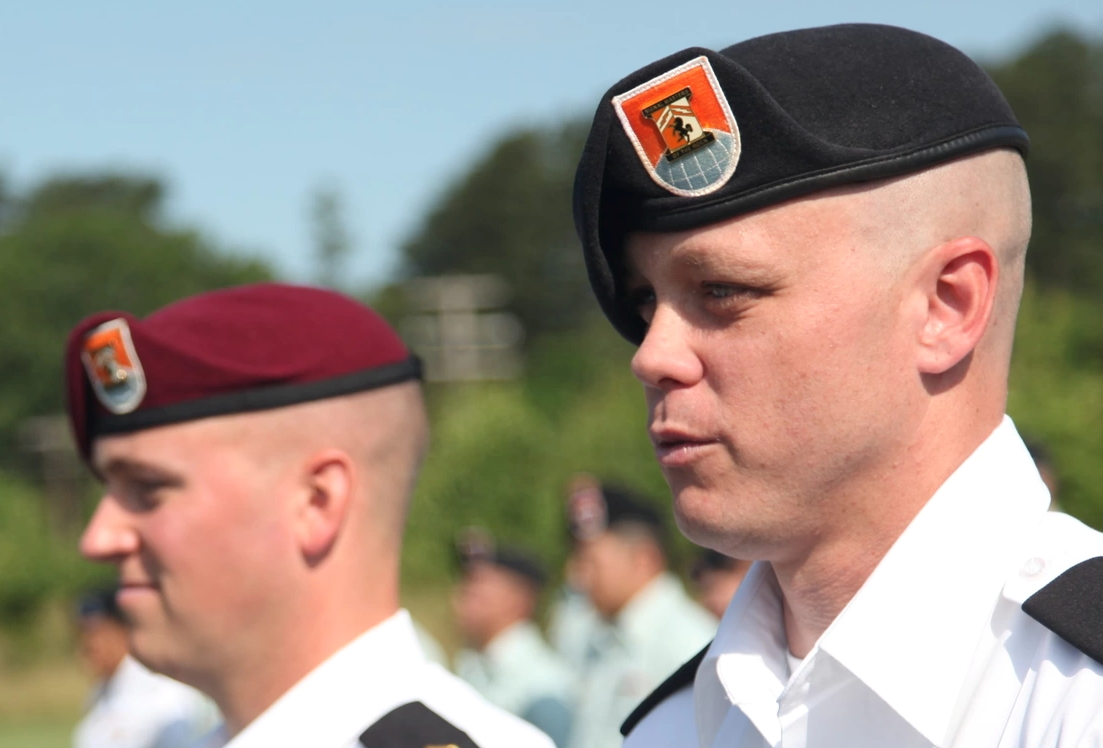
Signal Corps NCOs wearing maroon and black berets with 55th Signal Company Beret Flash and 114th Signal Battalion DUI—only the 55th's Airborne Combat Camera Documentation Team is authorized to wear the maroon beret but the company flash was authorized prior to the establishment of the Department of the Army Beret Flash (2012)

In 2001, ranger units were authorized to switch from black to tan berets due to the black beret no longer being the exclusive headgear of the rangers. With this change in beret color came a design change to the ranger's beret flashes, such as their flashes' border being changed from white to black stitching.

Example of ranger units beret flash changes due to the introduction of the tan beret

Original 3rd Battalion, 75th Ranger Regiment Beret Flash

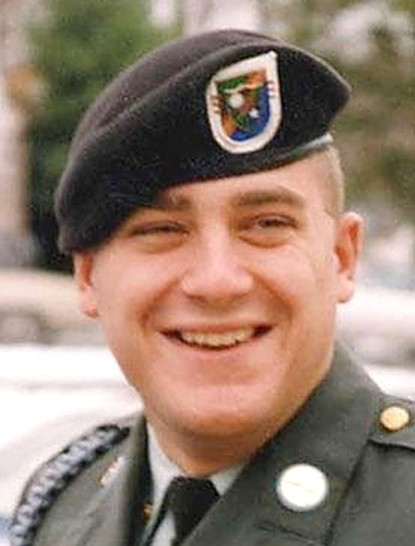
An infantryman wearing black beret with 3rd Battalion, 75th Ranger Regiment Beret Flash and regimental DUI (c. 1993)

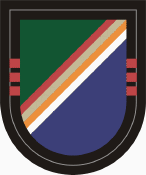
Current 3rd Battalion, 75th Ranger Regiment Beret Flash

An infantry NCO wearing tan beret with 3rd Battalion, 75th Ranger Regiment Beret Flash and regimental DUI (c. 2017)

First organizational beret flash authorized for a non–airborne unit since 1979

1st SFAB Beret Flash

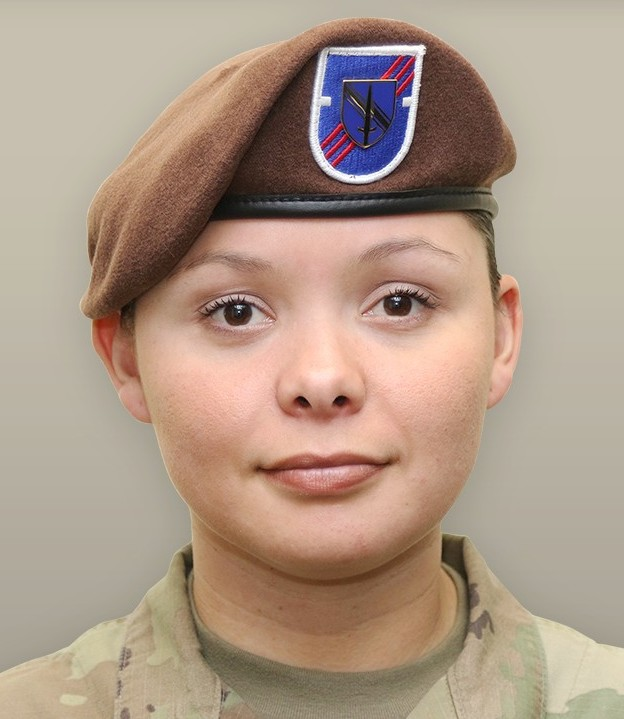
A soldier with 1st SFAB wearing brown beret with unit beret flash and DUI affixed (2018)

Army units can request an organizational beret flash for their unit from TIOH given it is not for wear on the Army black beret. A good example of this is TIOH's 2018 authorization of organizational beret flashes for the Security Force Assistance Command and its brigades (SFABs) for wear on their brown beret.

In 2024, soldiers with the 101st Airborne Division began wearing their unit's historical organizational beret flashes from the 1970s, as well as new beret flashes patterned after their battalion's airborne background trimming, on the Army black beret. Although no authorization for wear of new organizational beret flashes on Army black berets has been identified, soldiers from the 101st Airborne Division and the 1st Mobile Brigade Combat Team, 11th Airborne Division have been observed wearing new beret flashes in full view of senior leaders. Both formations have the "air assault" designation, which may relate to the new wear of organizational beret flashes.

Example of new and historical organizational beret flashes being worn by 101st Airborne Division soldiers

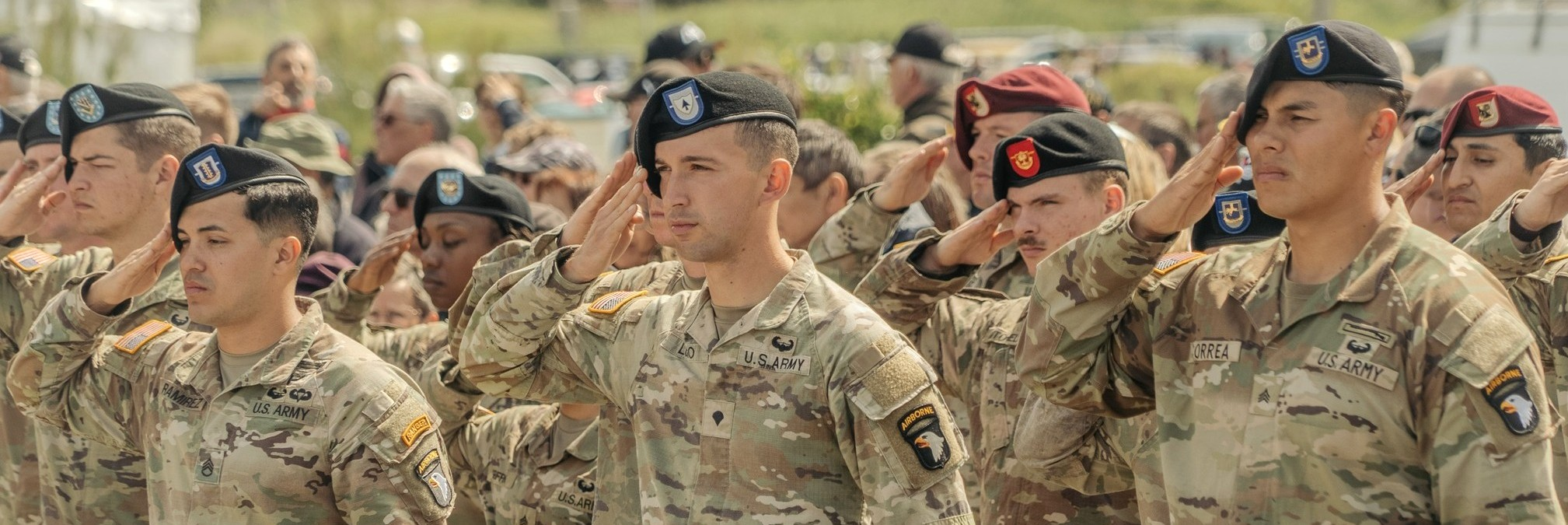
Some 101st battalion–level beret flashes from left–to–right: 1st Battalion, 187th Infantry Regiment (front–left); 1st Battalion, 26th Infantry Regiment (front–middle); 1st Battalion, 320th Field Artillery Regiment (FAR) (second row–middle); 1st Battalion, 502nd Infantry Regiment (third row–right); and 2nd Battalion, 502nd Infantry Regiment (first row–right) (2025)

1st Battalion, 187th Infantry Regiment Beret Flash (new)

1st Battalion, 26th Infantry Regiment Beret Flash (new)

1st Battalion, 320th FAR Beret Flash (same as 1-319th FAR)

1st Battalion, 502nd Infantry Regiment Beret Flash (historical)

2nd Battalion, 502nd Infantry Regiment Beret Flash (historical)

Example of the Special Forces Beret Flash

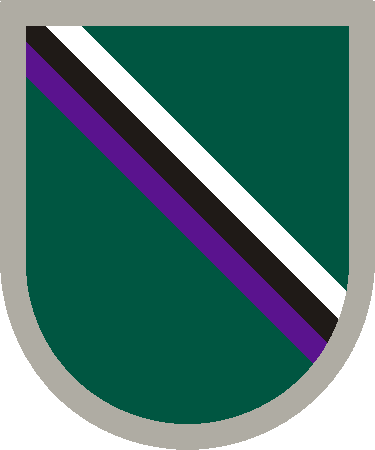
Special Forces (generic) Beret Flash

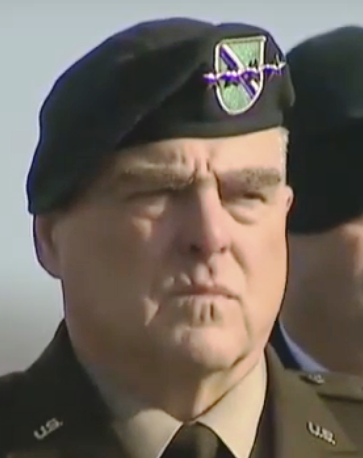
A special forces qualified officer wearing rifle–green beret with the generic Special Forces Beret Flash and polished metal general (O-10/OF-9) rank insignia affixed (2019)

In the 21st century, Army organizational beret flashes signify a specific formation of a specialized unit, such as an airborne, air assault, ranger, special forces, or combat advisor unit with some historical airborne units still authorized to wear their unit's beret flash. However, there is a generic Special Forces Beret Flash worn on the rifle–green beret when a special forces soldier is assigned to a special forces position in a unit not authorized an organizational beret flash. This beret flash is often worn by special forces qualified soldiers regardless of their status or position due to the rifle-green beret informally representing a soldier's special forces qualification rather than a special forces unit as it did in the 1960s through the early 1990s.

=== US Air Force ===
==== Weather Parachutists ====
First beret flash of the US Air Force

Vietnam Era Combat Weather Team Beret Flash

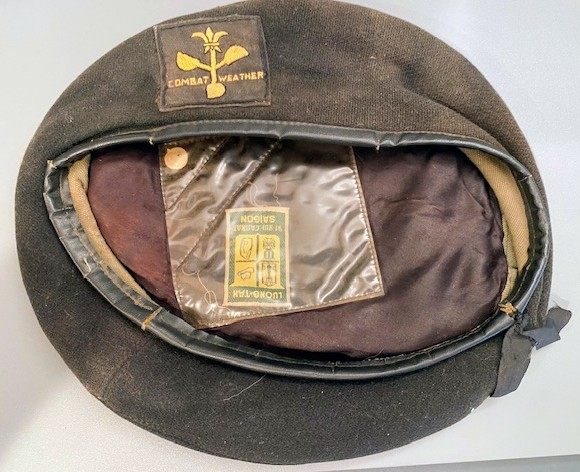
Photograph of Vietnam Era Combat Weather Team beret with beret flash

In the mid 1960s, Air Force commando weathermen, formally known as weather parachutists, with Detachment 26 of the 30th Weather Squadron and Detachment 32 of the 5th Weather Squadron informally wore black berets. A black cloth rectangle with a yellow embroidered anemometer surmounted by a fleur–de–lis with the words "Combat Weather" split by the anemometer was used as their beret flash.

5th Weather Squadron insignia and beret
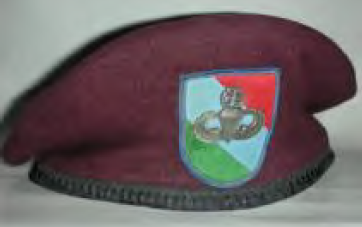
5th Weather Squadron Beret Flash (left) and maroon beret with beret flash and master parachutist badge affixed (right)

From 1970 through the 1980s, weather parachutists with the 5th Weather Squadron wore maroon berets with an Army style beret flash that incorporated their squadron emblem's alchemical symbol (for water) colors—green (Earth), blue (air), and red (fire)—and would affix their parachutist badge to the flash.

In 1979, weather parachutists were authorized to wear navy–blue berets with an Army style beret flash consisting of a blue and black field surrounded by yellow piping. Enlisted and NCOs affixed their parachutist badge to the flash while officers affixed their polished metal rank insignia. In 1986, the gray beret was authorized for wear by weather parachutists who continued to wear the aforementioned cloth beret flash until a new large color metallic Special Operations Weather Team Crest was authorized.

In 1992, the Air Force approved the return of the weather parachutist's blue, black, and yellow beret flash from the late 1970s and affixed their large color metal Special Operations Weather Team Crest to it.

Special Operations Weather Team example

Special Operations Weather Team Beret Flash

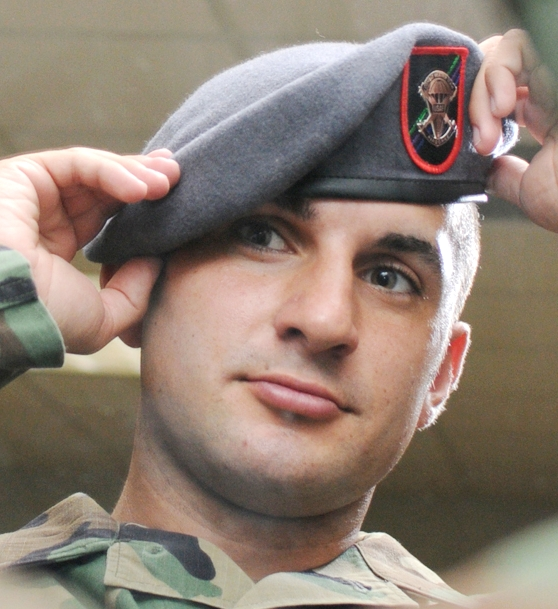
A weather parachutist with AFSOC's 107th Weather Flight wearing gray beret with Special Operations Weather Team Beret Flash and Combat Weather Team Crest (2008)

In 1996, weather parachutists assigned to Air Force Special Operations Command (AFSOC) began wearing a new Army style beret flash, known as the Special Operations Weather Team Beret Flash, while those assigned to Air Combat Command, known as combat weather teams, continued to wear the blue, black and yellow beret flash. The Special Operations Weather Team Beret Flash consisted of a red border representing the blood shed by their predecessors, a black background representing special operations, and three diagonal lines of various colors representing the services they supported (green=Army, purple=joint forces, and blue=Air Force). Officers affixed their polished metal rank insignia while enlisted and NCOs affixed their parachutist badge to the Special Operations Weather Team Beret Flash until 2002 when the Combat Weather Team Crest was created. The Combat Weather Team Crest was affixed to both Special Operations Weather Team and Combat Weather Team Beret Flashes by enlisted and NCOs while officers continued to affix their polished metal rank insignia.

In 2007/2008, the Special Operations Weather Team Beret Flash stopped being worn by AFSOC weather parachutists while the Combat Weather Team Beret Flash continues to be worn by combat weather teams.

==== Security Forces ====
1041st Security Police Squadron example

1041st Security Police Squadron Beret Flash

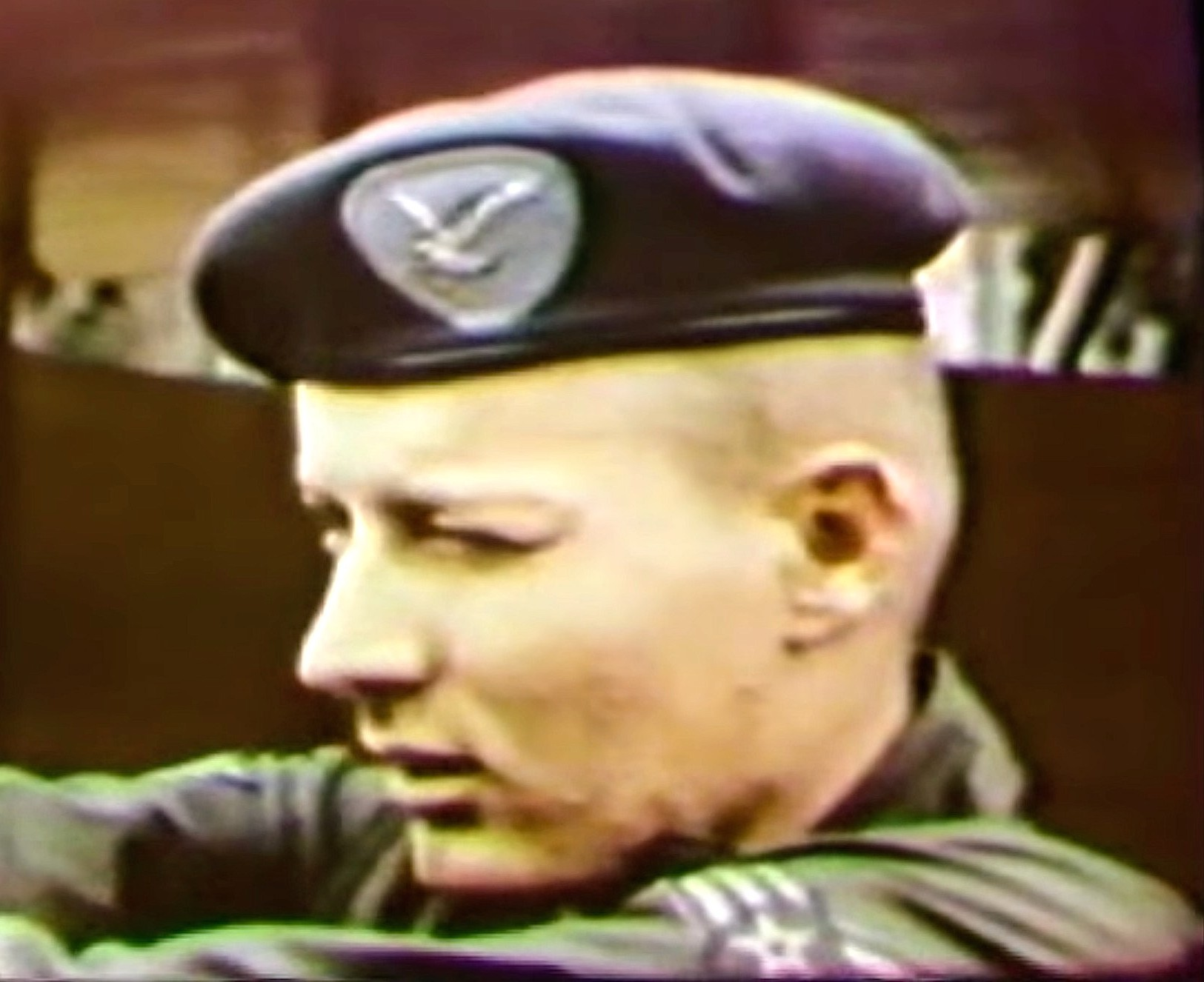
A security policeman with the 1041st Security Police Squadron wearing dark–blue beret and unit beret flash (c. 1967)

In 1966/67, the newly formed 1041st Security Police Squadron was authorized to wear a dark–blue beret with a unique organizational beret flash. The 1041st's beret flash has a depiction of a white falcon carrying a pair of lightning bolts on a rounded inverted light–blue cloth triangle that was worn over the left temple.

Security Forces example

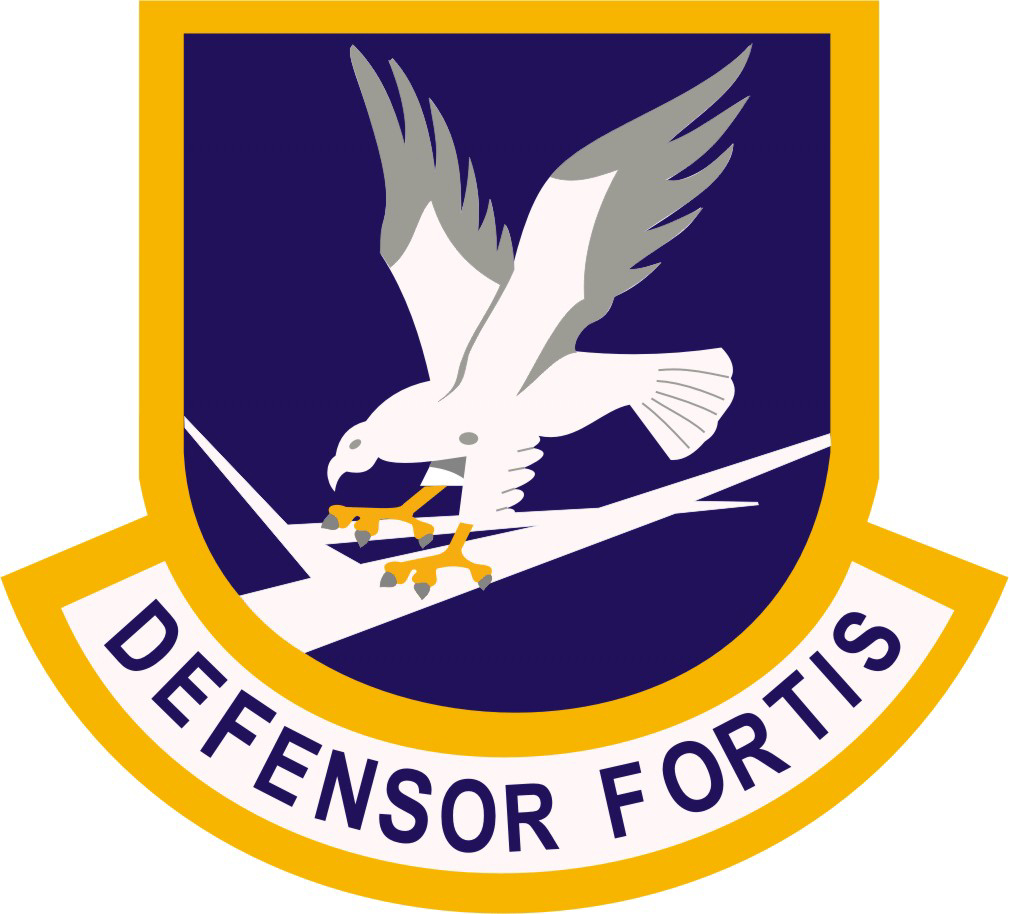
Security Forces Beret Flash

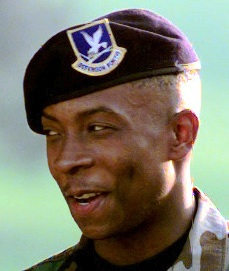
A security forces airman with the 55th Security Forces Squadron wearing navy–blue beret with Security Forces Beret Flash (1998)

In 1997, the Air Force stood up the security forces Air Force Specialty Code (AFSC), combining Air Force police and security forces into one career field, and honored the heraldry of the 1041st Security Police Squadron by creating a new organizational beret flash for all security forces airman and NCOs for wear on their dark-blue beret. The new Security Forces Beret Flash depicts the 1041st's falcon over an airfield on a dark–blue shield–shaped patch bordered in gold with a white scroll at its base embroidered with the motto "Defensor Fortis" (defenders of the force) in dark–blue title case. Security forces officers wear the same basic beret flash minus the embroidered falcon and airfield and in its place they affix their polished metal rank insignia.

==== TACP ====
Air Mobility Liaison Officer example

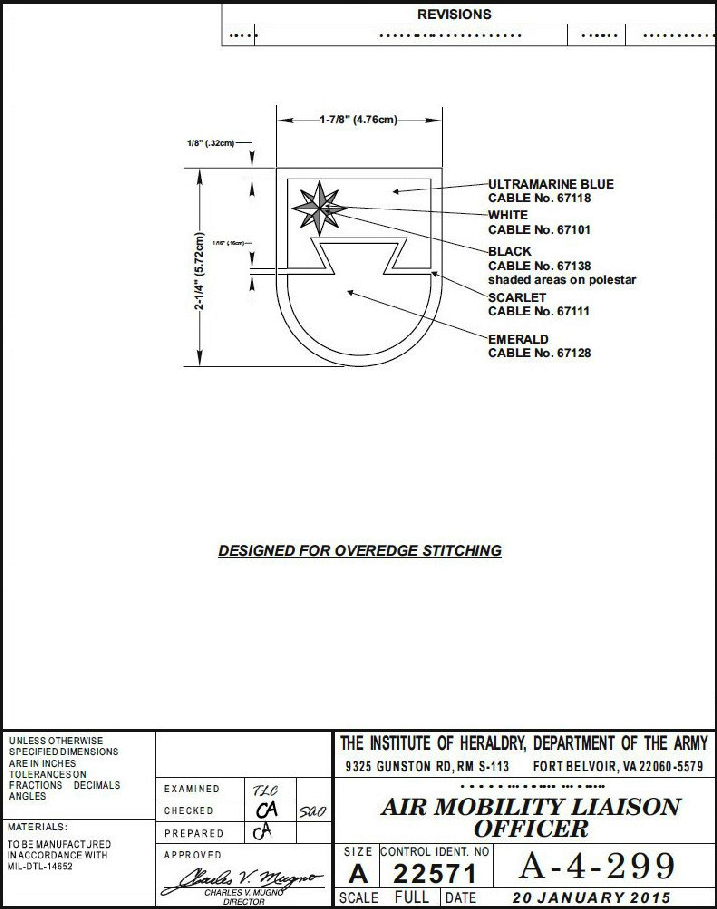
TIOH's manufacturing instructions

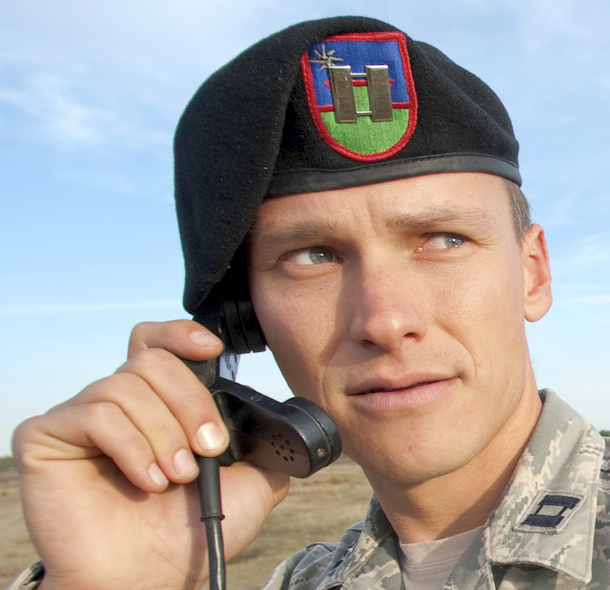
An Air Mobility Liaison Officer with the 8th Air Support Operations Squadron wearing black beret with Air Mobility Liaison Officer Beret Flash and polished metal captain rank insignia affixed (2011)

In 1979, TACP airman and NCOs were given authorization to wear the black beret. In 1984, two TACP's submitted a design for a unique beret flash and crest for wear on their berets which the Air Force approved one year later. The TACP Beret Flash consists of a scarlet border that represent the firepower TACP's bring to bear with two dovetailed fields of blue and green representing the close working relationship between the Air Force and the Army that is enabled by the TACP. TACP officers also wear the TACP Beret Flash and Crest but with miniature polished metal rank insignia below the crest.

Air liaison officers assigned to an air support operations squadron or group can also be given authorization to wear the black beret and TACP Beret Flash with full-size polished metal officer rank insignia (no crest).

Some Air Mobility Liaison Officers also wore the black beret. Although worn informally, in 2015 TIOH authorized a slight modification of the TACP Beret Flash for wear by Air Mobility Liaison Officers, incorporating an embroidered compass rose in the upper–left corner of the flash. The Air Mobility Liaison Officer Beret Flash was worn in the same manner as Air Liaison Officers wear the TACP Beret Flash.

==== Combat Aviation Advisors ====
Combat Aviation Advisor example

Combat Aviation Advisor Flash

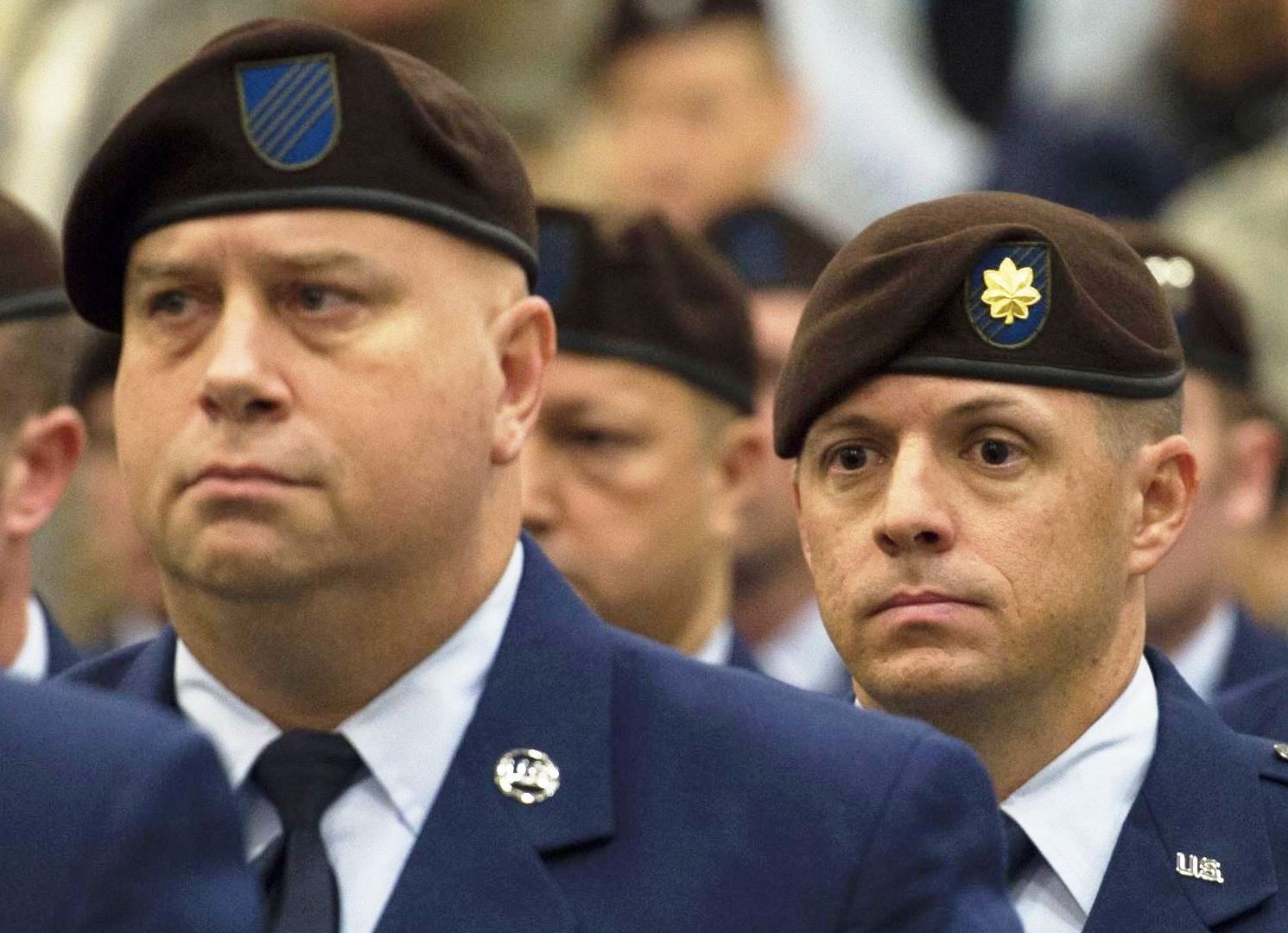
An NCO (left) and an officer (right) with a combat aviation advisor squadron are wearing brown berets with Combat Aviation Advisor Beret Flash with the officer affixing his metal major rank insignia (2018)

From 2018–2022, AFSOC authorized the wear of a dark brown beret for airman, NCOs, and officers assigned to combat aviation advisor squadrons, such as the 6th and 711th Special Operations Squadrons. The dark brown beret was worn with an Army style organizational beret flash consisting of a blue field with olive–green diagonal stripes and border. The Combat Aviation Advisor Beret Flash was worn centered over the left eye with polished metal officer rank insignia, chaplain branch insignia, or an AFSC metallic beret crest while all other advisors wore it without accoutrements.

=== US Navy ===
In the 1960s, select US Navy riverine patrol units operating in South Vietnam adopted the black beret to be part of their daily uniform and wore various accouterments on their berets. In 1967, the Commander of the Riverine Patrol Force sent an official message to the Commander of River Patrol Flotilla Five authorizing the wear of the black beret. In this message, the wear and appearance of the beret was defined stating, "Beret will be worn with river patrol force insignia centered on right side" and "Only standard size river patrol force insignia will be worn on beret. ... No other emblem or rank insignia will be displayed on beret." Today, these US Navy small boat units honor their heritage by wearing the black beret during special occasions—such as induction ceremonies into the Gamewardens Association—and will affix historically relevant riverine task force insignia for use as their beret flash.

Examples of US Navy riverine units' use of the black beret

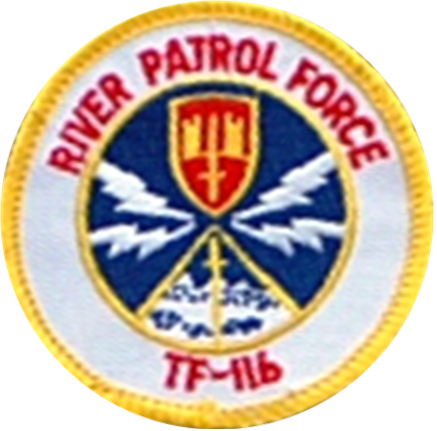
Riverine Patrol Force, Task Force 116 Insignia

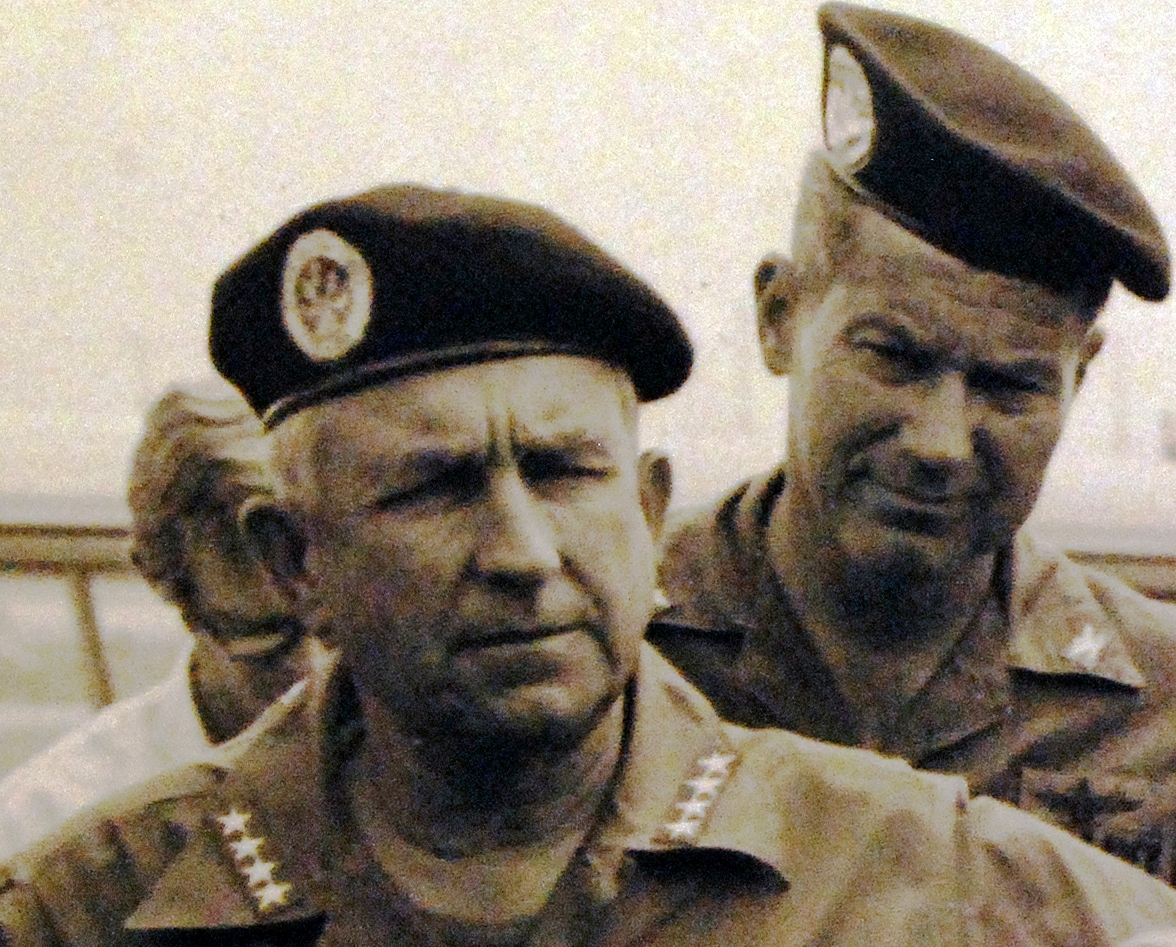
Chief of Naval Operations (left) and Commander, Riverine Patrol Force (right) wearing black berets with Task Force 116 Insignia (1969)

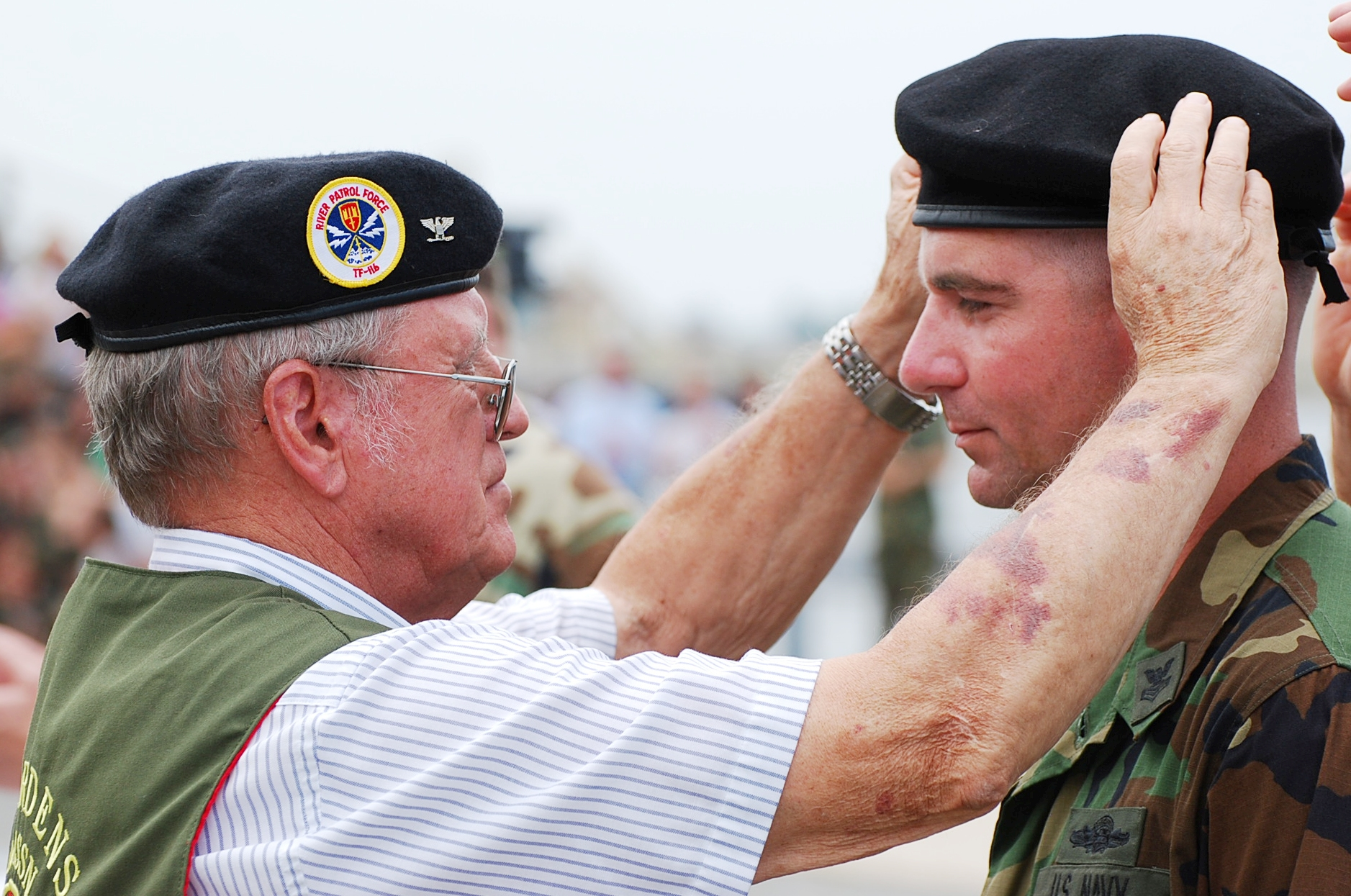
A Navy NCO from Riverine Squadron 1 receives the black beret with Task Force 116 Insignia at a ceremony making him an honorary "Gamewarden" (2011)

== Beret flashes of the US military (1973–present) ==
=== Air Force ===
Combat Weather Team
—formerly Special Operations Weather Team

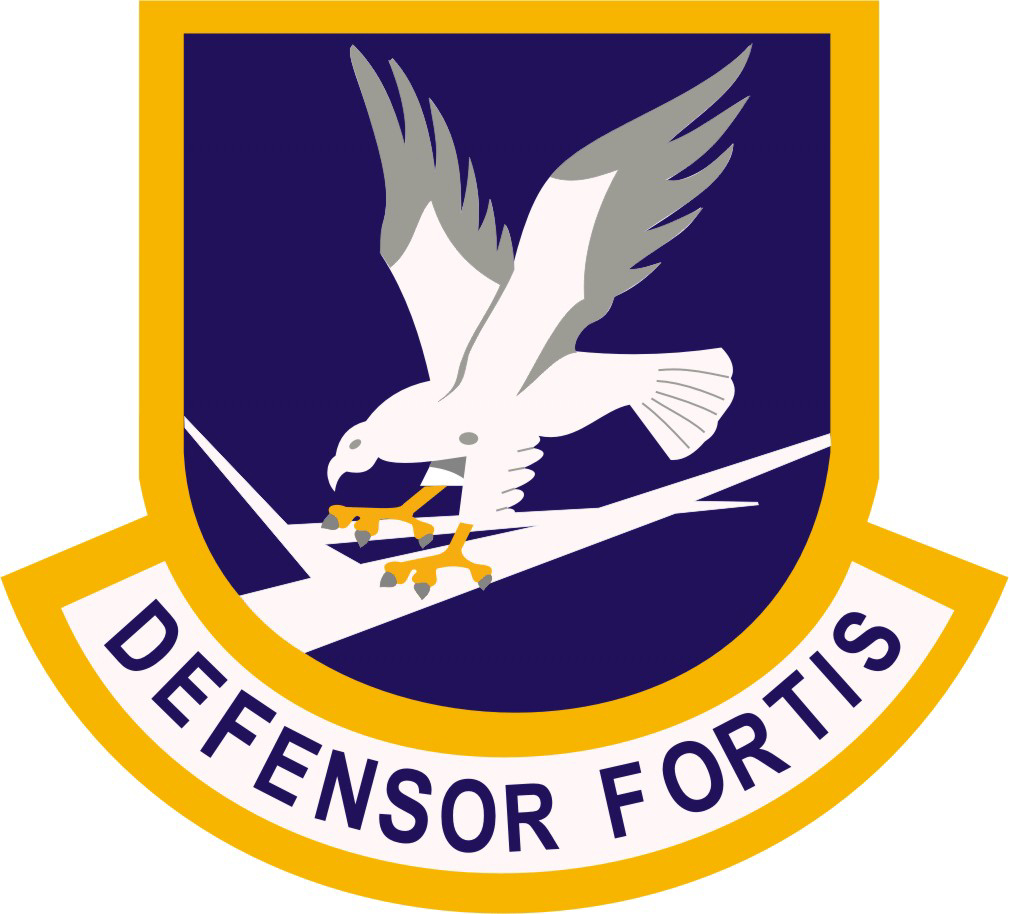
Security Forces

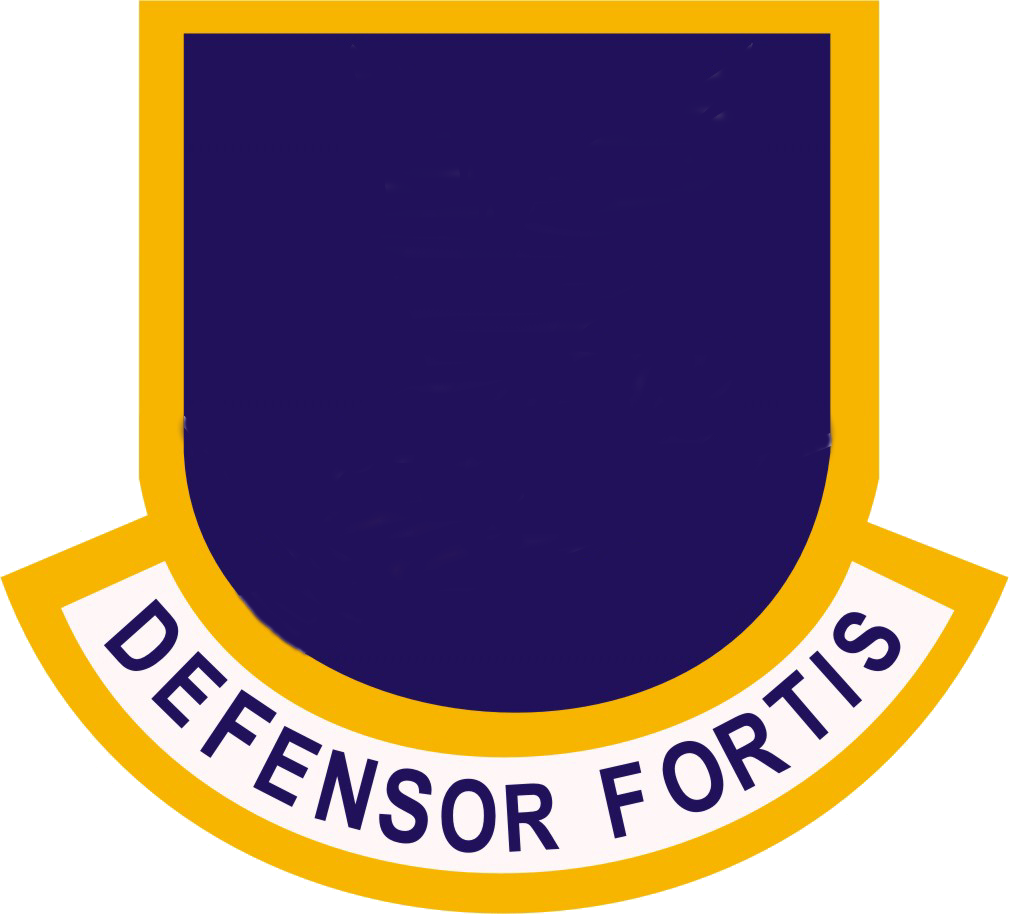
Security Forces Officer

–TACP
–TACP Officer
–Air Liaison Officer

Obsolete

Air Mobility Liaison Officer

Combat Aviation Advisor

Special Operations Weather Team

557th Weather Wing, 1st Weather Group, 5th Weather Squadron

=== Army ===
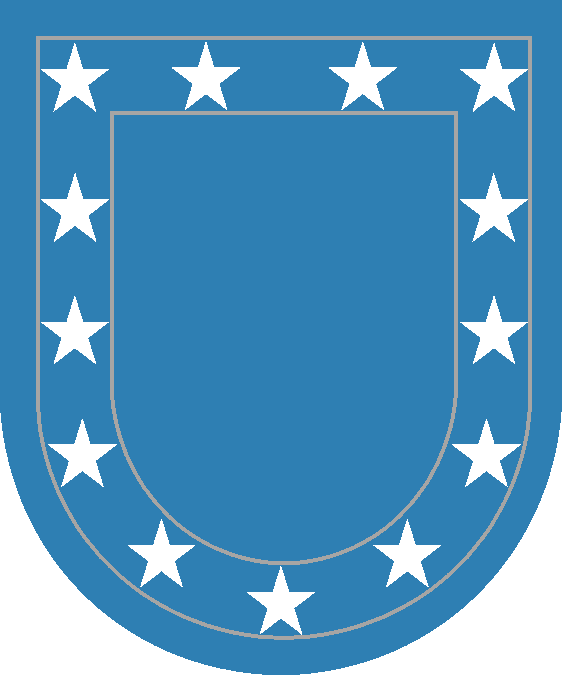
Department of the Army

==== Adjutant general ====
Obsolete

US Army Alaska, Fort Wainwright, Finance Element

1st Cavalry Division, 15th Adjutant General Company

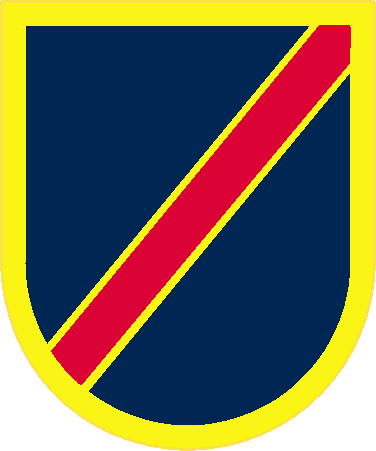
XVIII Airborne Corps, 18th Personnel Group

82nd Airborne Division, 82nd Finance Battalion

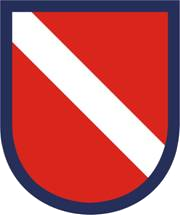
82nd Airborne Division, 82nd Personnel Services Battalion

==== Air defense artillery ====
82nd Airborne Division, 4th Air Defense Artillery Regiment, 3rd Division Air Defense Battalion
—formerly XVIII Airborne Corps, 108th Air Defense Artillery Brigade, 4th Air Defense Artillery Regiment, 3rd Battalion, Battery E

101st Airborne Division, 101st Airborne Division Artillery, 44th Air Defense Artillery Regiment, 2nd Battalion
—formerly 101st Airborne Division, 3rd Air Defense Artillery Regiment, 1st Battalion

Obsolete

US Army Alaska, 172nd Infantry Brigade, 43rd Air Defense Artillery Regiment, 1st Battalion

==== Aviation ====
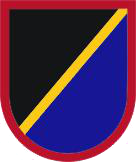
US Army Special Operations Aviation Command (USASOAC)

USASOAC, 160th Special Operations Aviation Regiment

USASOAC, 160th Special Operations Aviation Regiment, 1st Battalion

USASOAC, 160th Special Operations Aviation Regiment, 2nd Battalion

USASOAC, 160th Special Operations Aviation Regiment, 3rd Battalion

USASOAC, 160th Special Operations Aviation Regiment, 4th Battalion

82nd Airborne Division, Combat Aviation Brigade

82nd Airborne Division, Combat Aviation Brigade, 82nd Aviation Regiment, 1st Battalion

82nd Airborne Division, Combat Aviation Brigade, 82nd Aviation Regiment, 2nd Battalion

82nd Airborne Division, Combat Aviation Brigade, 82nd Aviation Regiment, 3rd Battalion

101st Airborne Division, 101st Combat Aviation Brigade
—formerly 1st Special Forces, 445th Chemical Detachment

Obsolete

Ohio National Guard, 73rd Infantry Brigade, 77th Infantry Detachment (Pathfinder)

Oklahoma Army National Guard, 245th Special Operations Aviation Regiment, 1st Battalion

Special Operations Command South, 617th Special Operations Aviation Detachment

-Texas Army National Guard, 1136th Infantry Detachment (Pathfinder)
-Texas Army National Guard, 36th Airborne Brigade

US Army Alaska, 172nd Infantry Brigade, 222nd Aviation Battalion

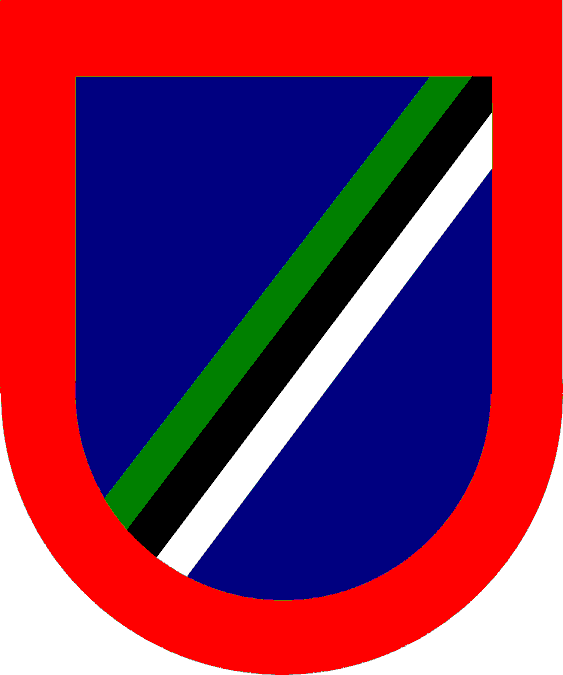
US Army Special Operations Command (USASOC), 160th Special Operations Aviation Group

Washington National Guard, 81st Infantry Brigade, Aviation Section

1st Special Forces, 22nd Aviation Detachment

1st Special Forces, 22nd Aviation Detachment Recognition Bar

–III Corps, 6th Cavalry Brigade, Pathfinder Section
–Various other units (see "Armor and cavalry" section)

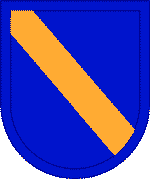
V Corps, 12th Aviation Brigade, Pathfinder Platoon

–VII Corps, 11th Aviation Group, Pathfinder Platoon (original version)
–1st Cavalry Division, 1st Brigade, 12th Cavalry Regiment, 1st Battalion
—currently National Guard Bureau, Army National Guard Warrior Training Center Brigade

VII Corps, 11th Aviation Brigade, Pathfinder Platoon

Eighth Army, 17th Aviation Brigade, Pathfinder Platoon

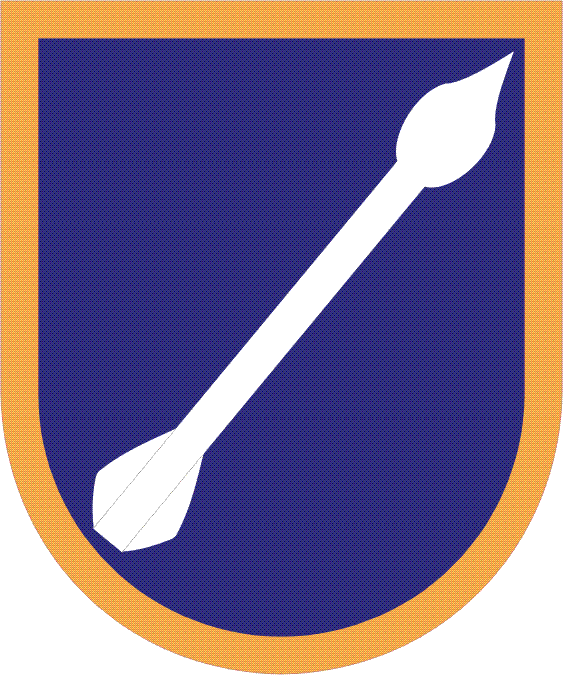
XVIII Airborne Corps, 18th Aviation Brigade

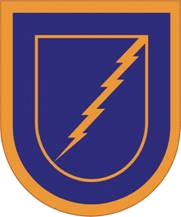
XVIII Airborne Corps, 58th Aviation Regiment, 1st Battalion

XVIII Airborne Corps, 229th Aviation Group

28th Infantry Division, 28th Infantry Detachment (Pathfinder) (original version)

28th Infantry Division, 28th Infantry Detachment (Pathfinder)

29th Infantry Division, 129th Infantry Detachment (Pathfinder)

40th Infantry Division, 76th Infantry Detachment (Pathfinder)

82nd Airborne Division, 82nd Aviation Brigade (original version)

82nd Airborne Division, 82nd Aviation Regiment, 1st Battalion (original version)

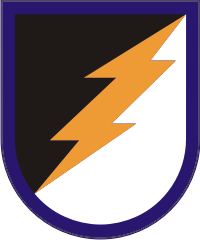
–82nd Airborne Division, 82nd Aviation Regiment, 1st Battalion (second version)

82nd Airborne Division, 82nd Aviation Regiment, 2nd Battalion (original version)

82nd Airborne Division, 82nd Combat Aviation Battalion (original version)

82nd Airborne Division, 82nd Combat Aviation Battalion

89th Army Reserve Command, 26th Infantry Platoon (Pathfinder)

96th Army Reserve Command, 79th Infantry Platoon (Pathfinder)

97th Army Reserve Command, 5th Infantry Platoon (Pathfinder)

==== Cavalry ====
Obsolete

–Arkansas Army National Guard, 39th Infantry Brigade, 151st Cavalry Regiment, Troop E
–Puerto Rico Army National Guard, 92nd Infantry Brigade, 192nd Cavalry Regiment, Troop E
–Tennessee Army National Guard, 278th Armored Cavalry Regiment
–US Army Armor School, 194th Armored Brigade, 10th Cavalry Regiment, Troop D (Long-Range Surveillance)
–US Army Reserve Officers' Training Corps, Temple University
–III Corps, 3rd Armored Cavalry Regiment
–III Corps, 6th Cavalry Brigade, Pathfinder Section
–82nd Airborne Division, 17th Cavalry Regiment, 1st Squadron (original version)

–US Army Alaska, 172nd Infantry Brigade, 1st Cavalry Regiment, Troop E
–1st Cavalry Division

–US Army Europe, 2nd Armored Cavalry Regiment (West Germany) (original version)
–US Army Europe, 11th Armored Cavalry Regiment, Reconnaissance Platoon (West Germany)

–US Army Europe, 2nd Armored Cavalry Regiment (West Germany)
–US Army Europe, 11th Armored Cavalry Regiment (West Germany)

–US Army Europe, 173rd Airborne Brigade, 16th Cavalry Regiment, Company D
–82nd Airborne Division, M10 Test Detachment
–82nd Airborne Division, 1st Brigade Combat Team, 68th Armor Regiment, 4th Battalion, Company A
–82nd Airborne Division, 73rd Armor Regiment, 3rd Battalion

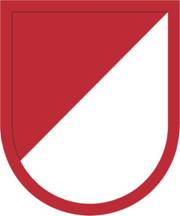
US Army Europe and Africa (USAREUR–AF), 173rd Airborne Brigade, 91st Cavalry Regiment, 1st Squadron

1st Cavalry Division, 1st Brigade, 8th Cavalry Regiment, 1st Battalion

1st Cavalry Division, 1st Brigade, 8th Cavalry Regiment, 2nd Battalion

–1st Cavalry Division, 1st Brigade, 12th Cavalry Regiment, 1st Battalion
–VII Corps, 11th Aviation Group, Pathfinder Platoon (original version)
—currently National Guard Bureau, Army National Guard Warrior Training Center Brigade

1st Cavalry Division, 2nd Brigade, 5th Cavalry Regiment, 1st Battalion

1st Cavalry Division, 2nd Brigade, 5th Cavalry Regiment, 2nd Battalion (made of plastic)

1st Cavalry Division, 3rd Brigade

1st Cavalry Division, 3rd Brigade, 7th Cavalry Regiment, 2nd Battalion

1st Cavalry Division, 3rd Brigade 7th Cavalry Regiment, 5th Battalion

1st Cavalry Division, 9th Cavalry Regiment, 1st Squadron

1st Cavalry Division, 10th Cavalry Regiment, 3rd Battalion

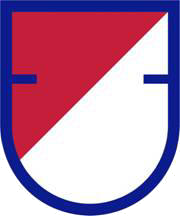
–11th Airborne Division, 2nd Mobile Brigade Combat Team, 40th Cavalry Regiment, 1st Squadron
–25th Infantry Division, 4th Brigade Combat Team, 40th Cavalry Regiment, 1st Squadron

82nd Airborne Division, 1st Brigade Combat Team, 73rd Cavalry Regiment, 3rd Squadron

82nd Airborne Division, 2nd Brigade Combat Team, 73rd Cavalry Regiment, 1st Squadron

82nd Airborne Division, 3rd Brigade Combat Team, 73rd Cavalry Regiment, 5th Squadron

82nd Airborne Division, 4th Brigade Combat Team, 73rd Cavalry Regiment, 4th Squadron

82nd Airborne Division, 82nd Combat Aviation Brigade, 17th Cavalry Regiment, 1st Squadron

101st Airborne Division, 17th Cavalry Regiment, 2nd Squadron

==== Chemical ====
Obsolete

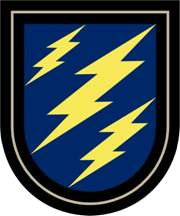
1st Special Forces, 5th Special Forces Group, 56th Chemical Reconnaissance Detachment

1st Special Forces, 445th Chemical Detachment
—Currently 101st Airborne Division, 101st Combat Aviation Brigade

==== Civil affairs ====
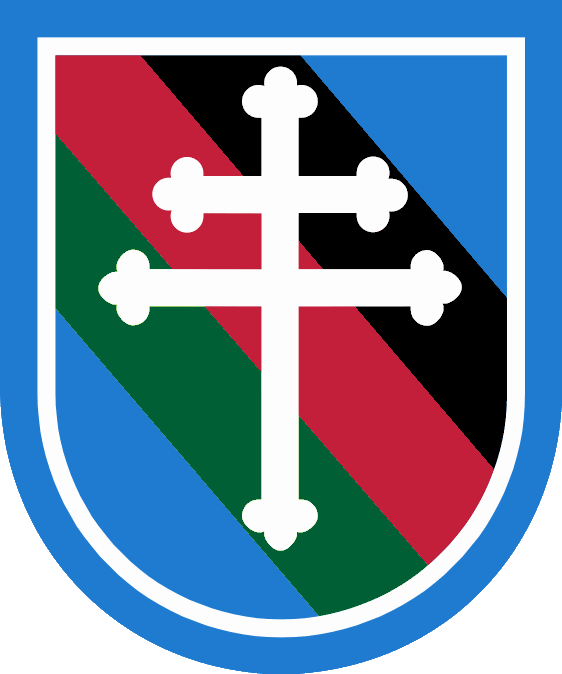
US Army Civil Affairs and Psychological Operations Command (USACAPOC), 351st Civil Affairs Command, 358th Civil Affairs Brigade, 416th Civil Affairs Battalion

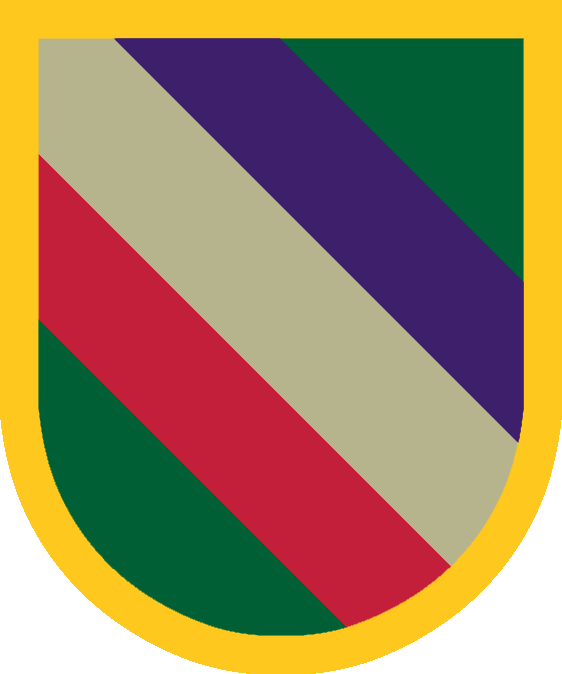
USACAPOC, 351st Civil Affairs Command, 358th Civil Affairs Brigade, 426th Civil Affairs Battalion

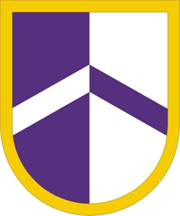
USACAPOC, 352nd Civil Affairs Command, 360th Civil Affairs Brigade

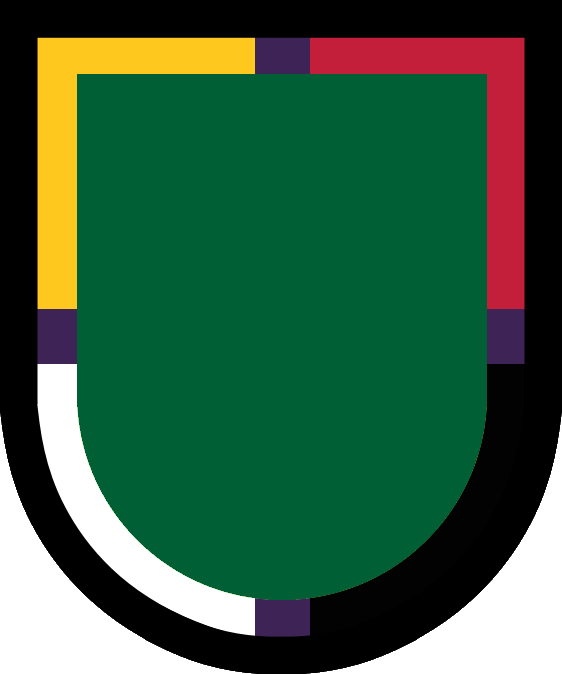
USACAPOC, 352nd Civil Affairs Command, 360th Civil Affairs Brigade, 404th Civil Affairs Battalion

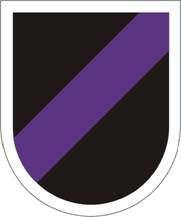
USACAPOC, 352nd Civil Affairs Command, 360th Civil Affairs Brigade, 412th Civil Affairs Battalion

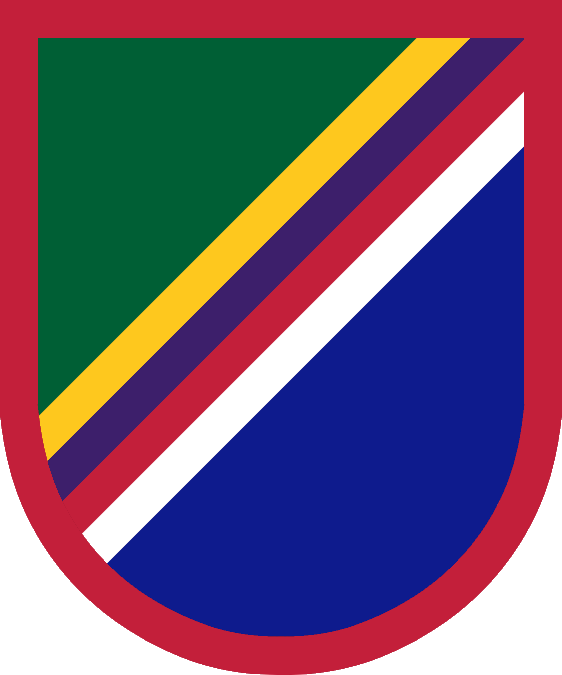
USACAPOC, 352nd Civil Affairs Command, 360th Civil Affairs Brigade, 450th Civil Affairs Battalion

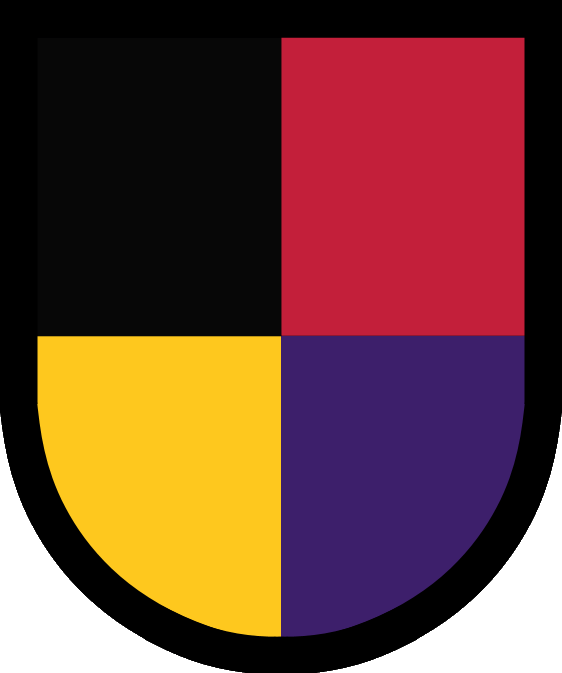
USACAPOC, 352nd Civil Affairs Command, 360th Civil Affairs Brigade, 478th Civil Affairs Battalion

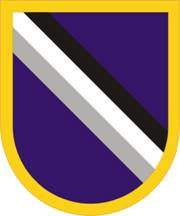
1st Special Forces Command, 95th Civil Affairs Brigade

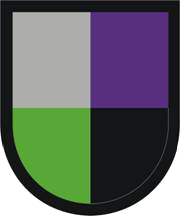
1st Special Forces Command, 95th Civil Affairs Brigade, 91st Civil Affairs Battalion

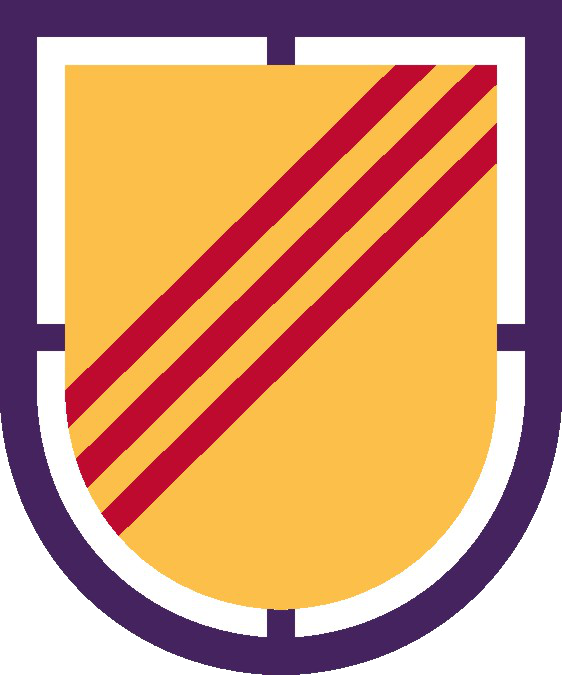
1st Special Forces Command, 95th Civil Affairs Brigade, 92nd Civil Affairs Battalion

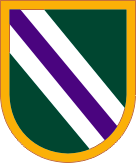
1st Special Forces Command, 95th Civil Affairs Brigade, 96th Civil Affairs Battalion

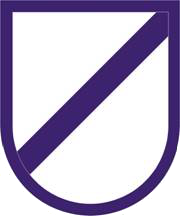
1st Special Forces Command, 95th Civil Affairs Brigade, 97th Civil Affairs Battalion

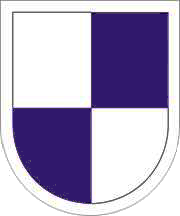
1st Special Forces Command, 95th Civil Affairs Brigade, 98th Civil Affairs Battalion

Obsolete

1st Special Operations Command, 96th Civil Affairs Battalion, Company A

==== Engineers ====
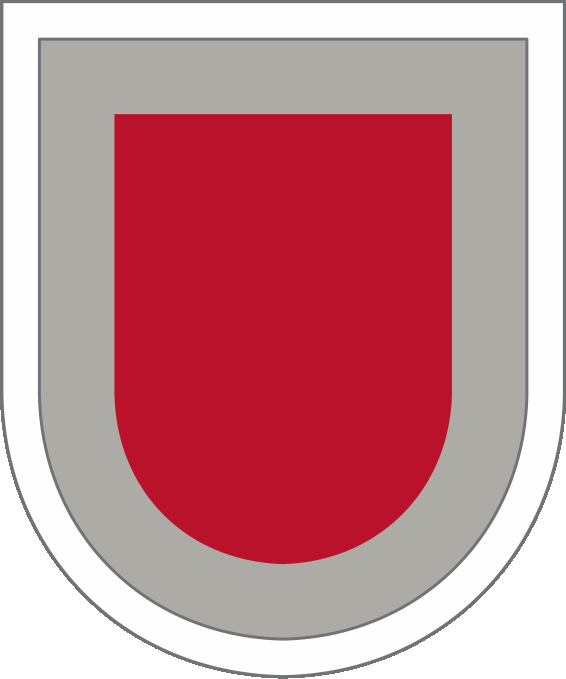
USAREUR–AF, 173rd Airborne Brigade, 173rd Brigade Engineer Company
—formerly USAREUR–AF, 173rd Airborne Brigade, 54th Brigade Engineer Battalion

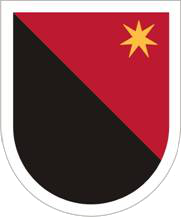
11th Airborne Division, 6th Division Engineer Battalion
—formerly
–11th Airborne Division, 2nd Brigade Combat Team, 6th Brigade Engineer Battalion
–25th Infantry Division, 4th Brigade Combat Team, 6th Brigade Engineer Battalion

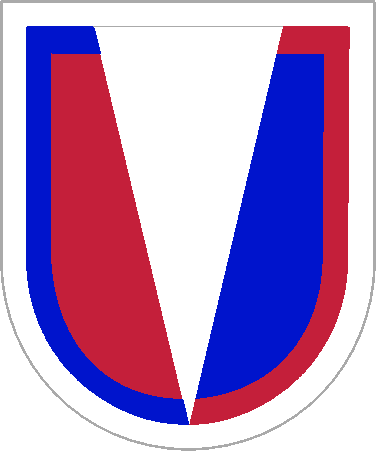
XVIII Airborne Corps, 20th Engineer Brigade

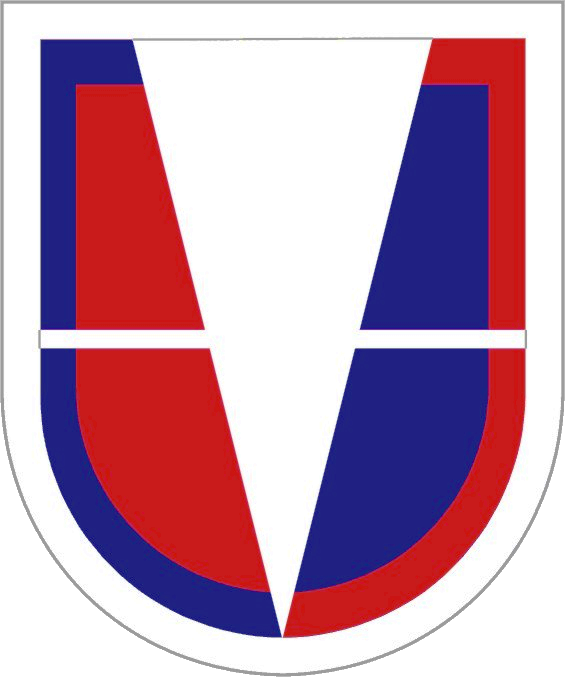
XVIII Airborne Corps, 20th Engineer Brigade, 27th Engineer Battalion

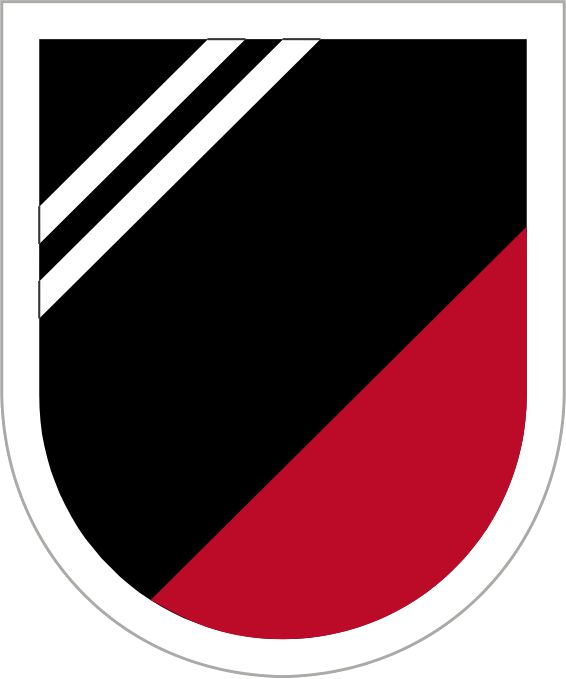
XVIII Airborne Corps, 20th Engineer Brigade, 27th Engineer Battalion, 57th Engineer Company

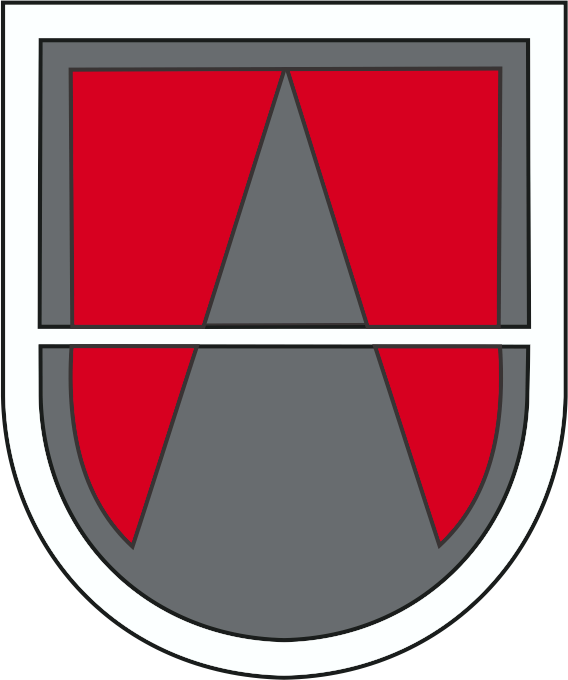
XVIII Airborne Corps, 20th Engineer Brigade, 27th Engineer Battalion, 161st Engineer Company

82nd Airborne Division, 307th Division Engineer Battalion

82nd Airborne Division, 307th Division Engineer Battalion, 618th Engineer Support Company

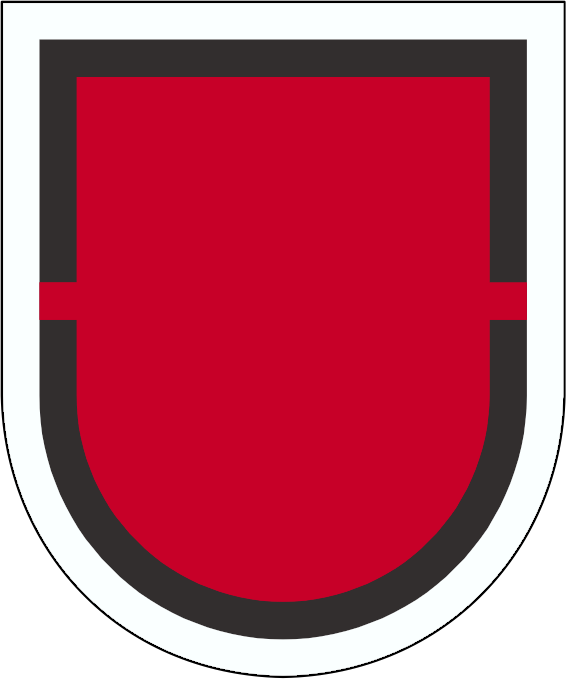
82nd Airborne Division, 307th Division Engineer Battalion, 919th Engineer Company

101st Airborne Division, 326th Division Engineer Battalion

Obsolete

US Army Alaska, Fort Wainwright, 47th Engineer Company

US Army Alaska, 172nd Infantry Brigade, 23rd Engineer Company (original version)

US Army Alaska, 172nd Infantry Brigade, 562nd Engineer Company

US Army Forces Command, 20th Engineer Battalion

–1st Cavalry Division, 8th Engineer Battalion
–1st Cavalry Division, 1st Cavalry Division Artillery (original version)

XVIII Airborne Corps, 20th Engineer Brigade (original version)

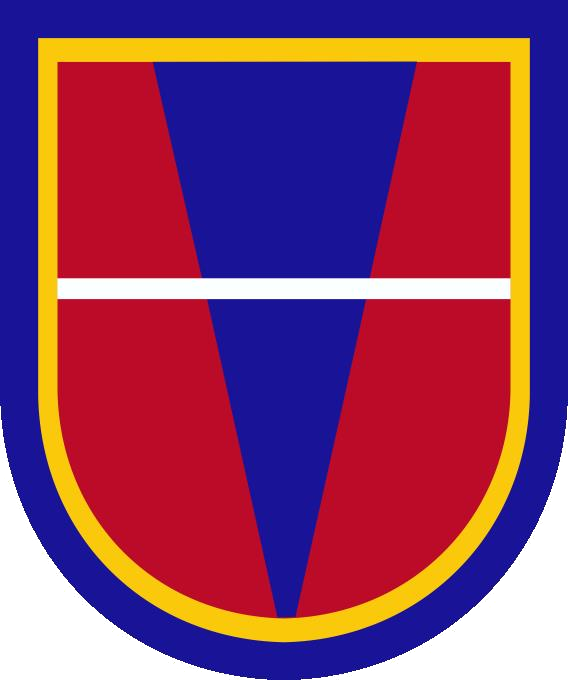
XVIII Airborne Corps, 20th Engineer Brigade, 738th Engineer Company

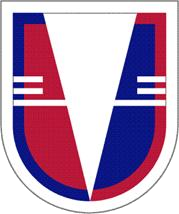
XVIII Airborne Corps, 20th Engineer Brigade, 30th Engineer Battalion

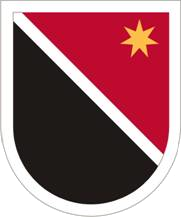
25th Infantry Division, 4th Brigade Combat Team, 6th Brigade Engineer Battalion, 23rd Engineer Company

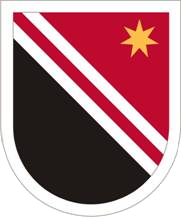
25th Infantry Division, 4th Brigade Combat Team, 6th Brigade Engineer Battalion, 84th Engineer Company

82nd Airborne Division, 1st Brigade Combat Team, 127th Engineer Battalion (original version)

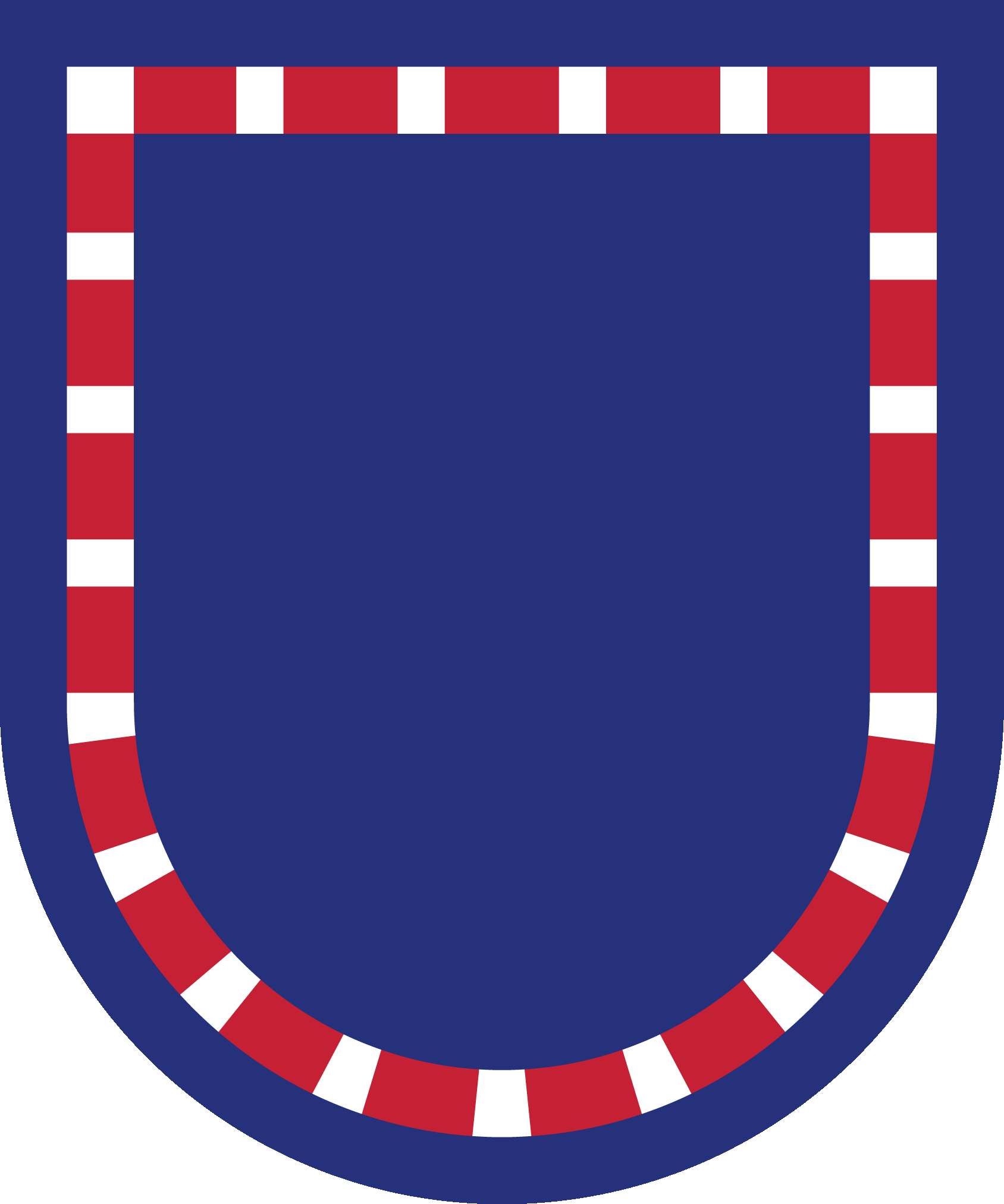
82nd Airborne Division, 1st Brigade Combat Team, 127th Brigade Engineer Battalion

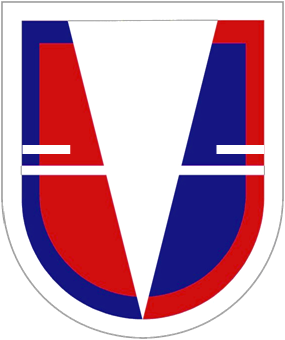
82nd Airborne Division, 2nd Brigade Combat Team, 37th Brigade Engineer Battalion

101st Airborne Division, 2nd Mobile Brigade Combat Team, 39th Brigade Engineer Battalion

==== Field artillery ====
USAREUR–AF, 173rd Airborne Brigade, 319th FAR, 4th Battalion

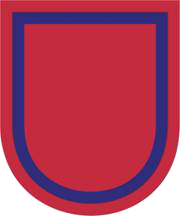
11th Airborne Division, 2nd Mobile Brigade Combat Team, 377th FAR, 2nd Battalion
—formerly 25th Infantry Division, 4th Brigade Combat Team, 377th FAR, 2nd Battalion

–82nd Airborne Division, 82nd Airborne Division Artillery
–101st Airborne Division, 101st Airborne Division Artillery

–82nd Airborne Division, 82nd Airborne Division Artillery, 319th FAR, 1st Battalion
–101st Airborne Division, 101st Airborne Division Artillery, 320th FAR, 1st Battalion

–82nd Airborne Division, 82nd Airborne Division Artillery, 319th FAR, 2nd Battalion
–101st Airborne Division, 101st Airborne Division Artillery, 32nd FAR, 2nd Battalion

–82nd Airborne Division, 82nd Airborne Division Artillery, 319th FAR, 3rd Battalion
–101st Airborne Division, 101st Airborne Division Artillery, 320th FAR, 3rd Battalion

Obsolete

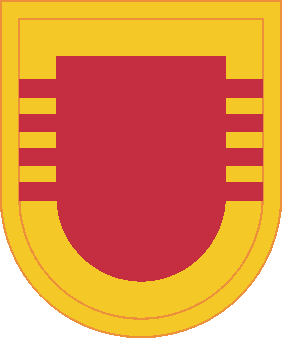
US Army Alaska, 172nd Infantry Brigade, 11th FAR, 4th Battalion, Battery C

–US Army Alaska, 172nd Infantry Brigade, 37th FAR, 1st Battalion, Battery C
–1st Cavalry Division, 1st Cavalry Division Artillery

–1st Cavalry Division, 1st Cavalry Division Artillery (original version)
–1st Cavalry Division, 8th Engineer Battalion

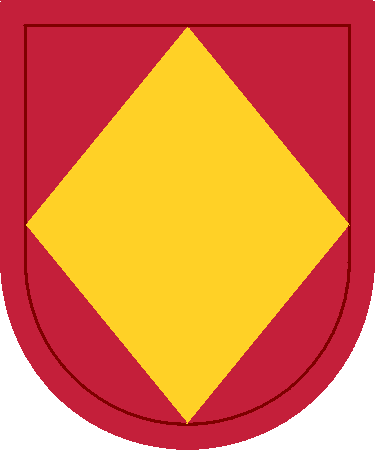
XVIII Airborne Corps, XVIII Airborne Corps Artillery

XVIII Airborne Corps, 18th Field Artillery Brigade

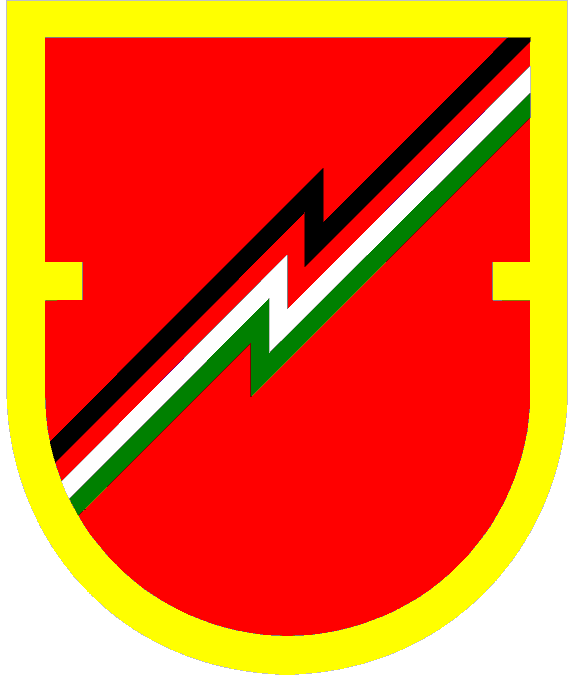
XVIII Airborne Corps, 18th Field Artillery Brigade, 1st Field Artillery Detachment

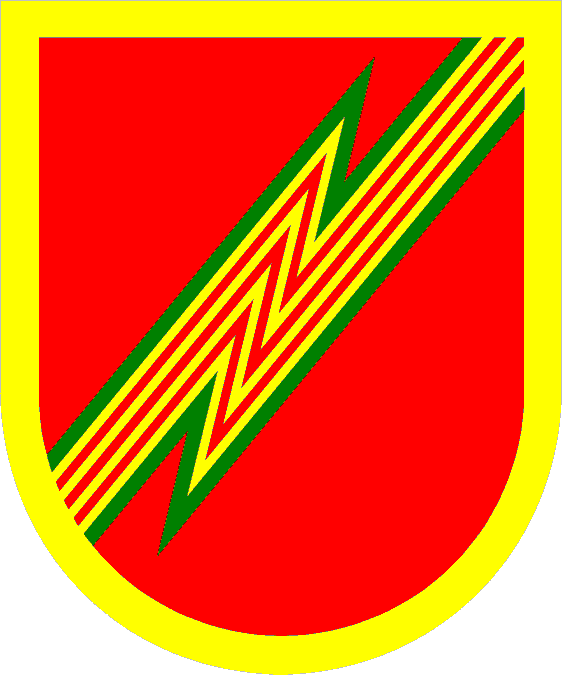
XVIII Airborne Corps, 18th Field Artillery Brigade, 234th Field Artillery Detachment

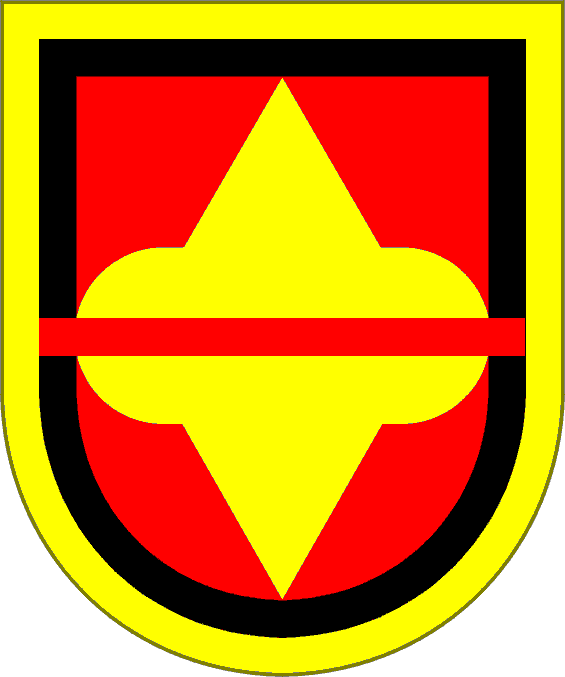
XVIII Airborne Corps, 18th Field Artillery Brigade, 321st FAR, 1st Battalion

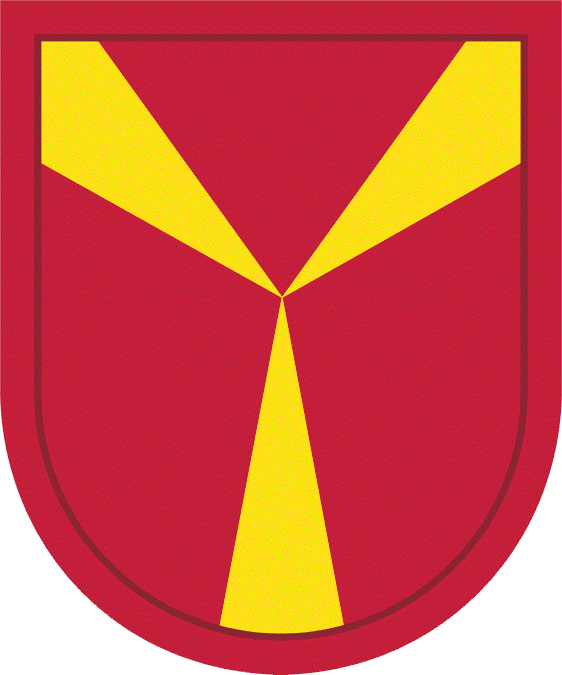
XVIII Airborne Corps, 18th Field Artillery Brigade, 377th FAR, 1st Battalion

82nd Airborne Division, 4th Brigade Combat Team, 321st FAR, 2nd Battalion

==== Infantry ====
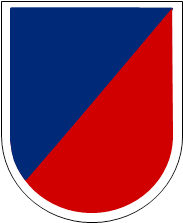
USAREUR–AF, 173rd Airborne Brigade

USAREUR–AF, 173rd Airborne Brigade, 503rd Infantry Regiment, 1st Battalion
—formerly 101st Airborne Division, 3rd Brigade, 503rd Infantry Regiment, 1st Battalion

USAREUR–AF, 173rd Airborne Brigade, 503rd Infantry Regiment, 2nd Battalion
—formerly 101st Airborne Division, 3rd Brigade, 503rd Infantry Regiment, 2nd Battalion

USAREUR–AF, 173rd Airborne Brigade, 504th Infantry Regiment, 3rd Battalion
—formerly 82nd Airborne Division, 1st Brigade Combat Team, 504th Infantry Regiment, 3rd Battalion

USASOC, 75th Ranger Regiment

USASOC, 75th Ranger Regiment, 1st Battalion

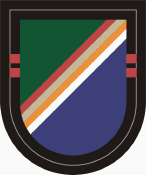
USASOC, 75th Ranger Regiment, 2nd Battalion

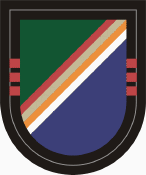
USASOC, 75th Ranger Regiment, 3rd Battalion

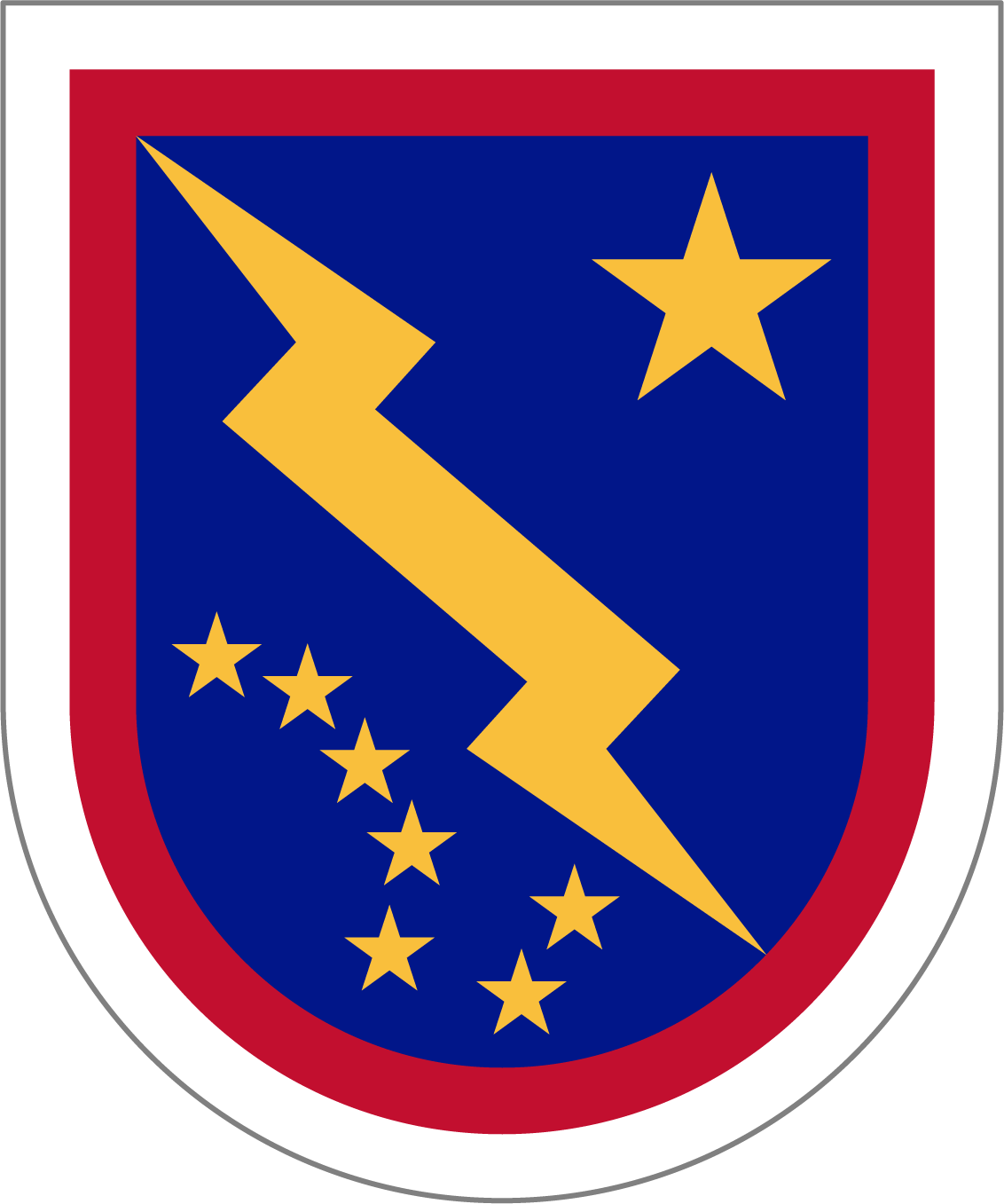
11th Airborne Division

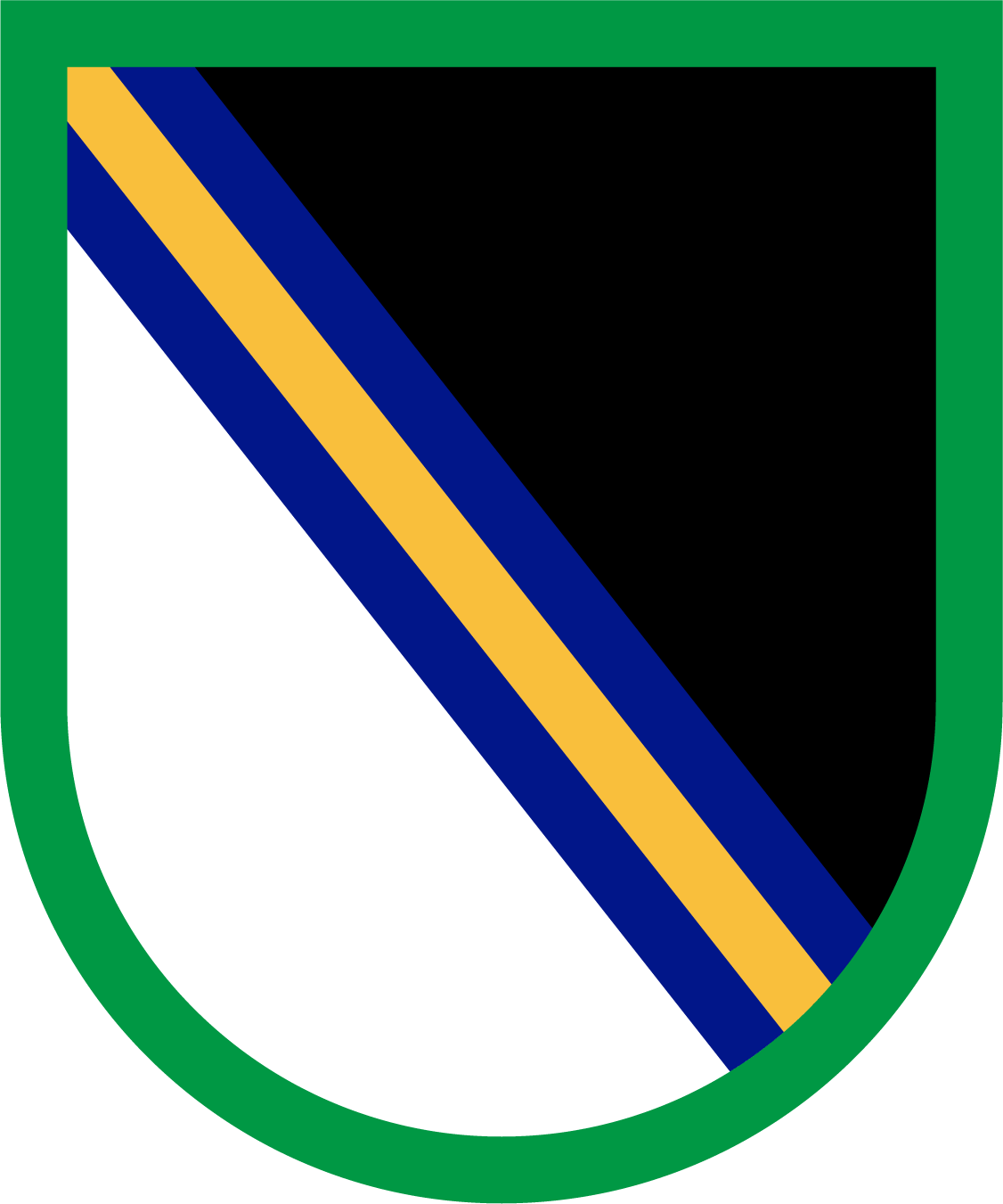
11th Airborne Division, 1st Mobile Brigade Combat Team

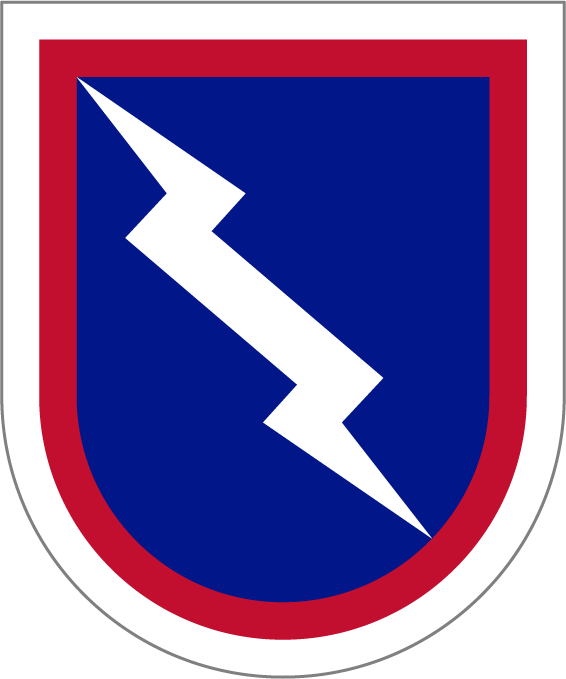
11th Airborne Division, 2nd Mobile Brigade Combat Team

11th Airborne Division, 2nd Mobile Brigade Combat Team, 501st Infantry Regiment, 1st Battalion
—formerly
–25th Infantry Division, 4th Mobile Brigade Combat Team, 501st Infantry Regiment, 1st Battalion
–101st Airborne Division, 2nd Brigade, 501st Infantry Regiment, 1st Battalion

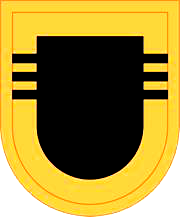
11th Airborne Division, 2nd Mobile Brigade Combat Team, 509th Infantry Regiment, 3rd Battalion
—formerly 25th Infantry Division, 4th Brigade Combat Team, 509th Infantry Regiment, 3rd Battalion

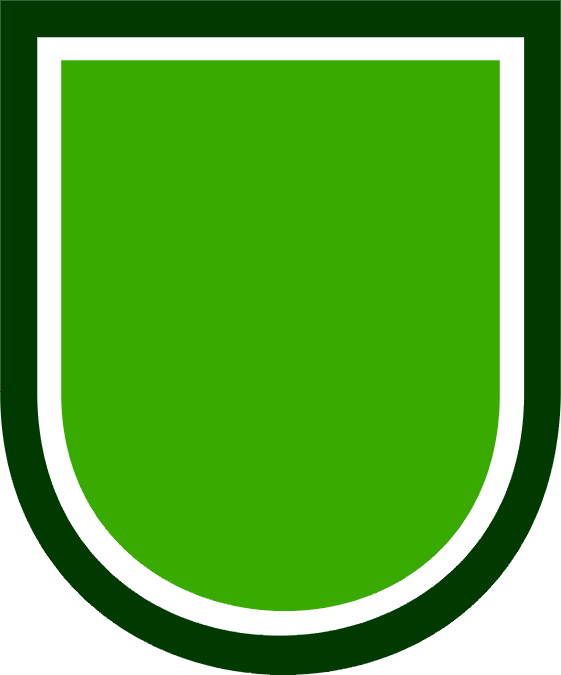
11th Airborne Division, 2nd Mobile Brigade Combat Team, 511th Infantry Regiment, 1st Battalion
—formerly US Army Aviation Center and School, 511th Infantry, Company A (Pathfinder)

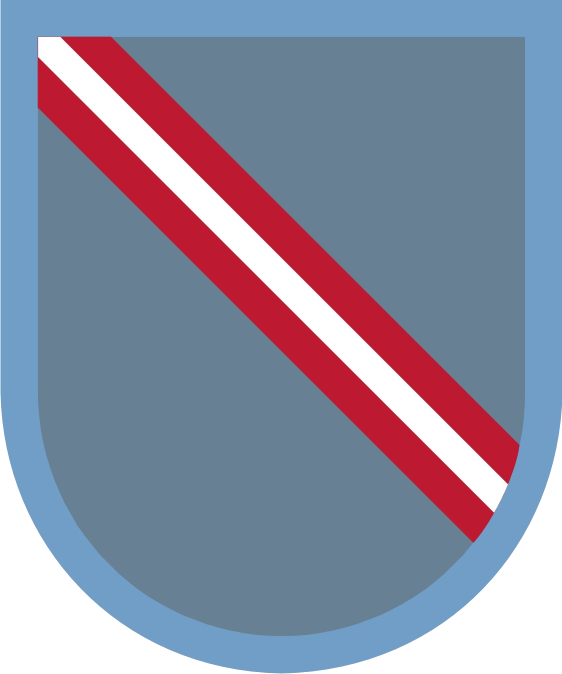
36th Infantry Division, 56th Brigade Combat Team, 143rd Infantry Regiment, 1st Battalion

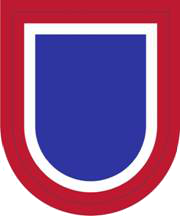
82nd Airborne Division

82nd Airborne Division, 1st Brigade Combat Team

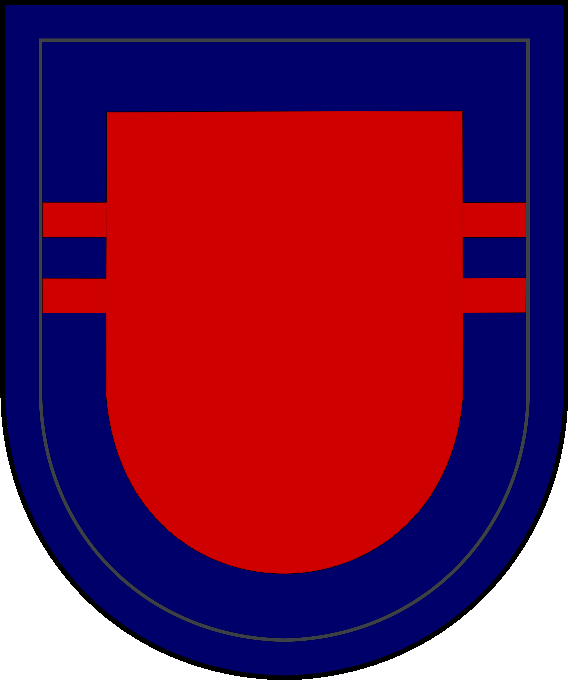
82nd Airborne Division, 1st Brigade Combat Team, 501st Infantry Regiment, 2nd Battalion

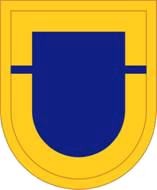
82nd Airborne Division, 1st Brigade Combat Team, 504th Infantry Regiment, 1st Battalion

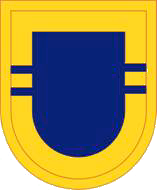
82nd Airborne Division, 1st Brigade Combat Team, 504th Infantry Regiment, 2nd Battalion

82nd Airborne Division, 2nd Brigade Combat Team

82nd Aiirborne Division, 2nd Brigade Combat Team, 325th Infantry Regiment, 1st Battalion

82nd Airborne Division, 2nd Brigade Combat Team, 325th Infantry Regiment, 2nd Battalion

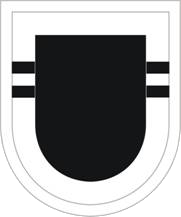
82nd Airborne Division, 2nd Brigade Combat Team, 508th Infantry Regiment, 2nd Battalion
—formerly 82nd Airborne Division, 4th Brigade Combat Team, 508th Infantry Regiment, 2nd Battalion

82nd Airborne Division, 3rd Brigade Combat Team

82nd Airborne Division, 505th Infantry Regiment, 1st Battalion

82nd Airborne Division, 3rd Brigade Combat Team, 505th Infantry Regiment, 2nd Battalion

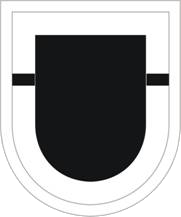
82nd Airborne Division, 3rd Brigade Combat Team, 508th Infantry Regiment, 1st Battalion
—formerly 82nd Airborne Division, 4th Brigade Combat Team, 508th Infantry Regiment, 1st Battalion

101st Airborne Division

101st Airborne Division, 1st Mobile Brigade Combat Team

101st Airborne Division, 1st Mobile Brigade Combat Team, 327th Infantry Regiment, 1st Battalion

101st Airborne Division, 1st Mobile Brigade Combat Team, 327th Infantry Regiment, 2nd Battalion

101st Airborne Division, 1st Mobile Brigade Combat Team, 506th Infantry Regiment, 1st Battalion

101st Airborne Division, 2nd Mobile Brigade Combat Team

101st Airborne Division, 2nd Mobile Brigade Combat Team, 26th Infantry Regiment, 1st Battalion

101st Airborne Division, 2nd Mobile Brigade Combat Team, 502nd Infantry Regiment, 1st Battalion

101st Airborne Division, 2nd Mobile Brigade Combat Team, 502nd Infantry Regiment, 2nd Battalion

101st Airborne Division, 3rd Mobile Brigade Combat Team

101st Airborne Division, 3rd Mobile Brigade Combat Team, 187th Infantry Regiment, 1st Battalion

101st Airborne Division, 3rd Mobile Brigade Combat Team, 187th Infantry Regiment, 3rd Battalion

101st Airborne Division, 3rd Mobile Brigade Combat Team, 506th Infantry Regiment, 2nd Battalion

Obsolete

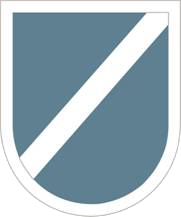
–Indiana Army National Guard, 151st Infantry Regiment, Company D (Ranger)
–Indiana Army National Guard, 219th Battlefield Surveillance Brigade (BfSB), 152nd Cavalry Regiment, 2nd Squadron, Troop C (Long-Range Surveillance)
–38th Infantry Division, 151st Infantry Regiment, Company D (Long-Range Surveillance)

Michigan Army National Guard, 425th Infantry Regiment, Company E and F (Ranger)

Puerto Rico Army National Guard, 92nd Infantry Brigade

–Texas Army National Guard, 143rd Infantry Regiment, Company G (Ranger)
–Texas Army National Guard, 143rd Infantry Regiment, Company G (Long-Range Surveillance)

-Texas Army National Guard, 36th Airborne Brigade
-Texas Army National Guard, 1136th Infantry Detachment (Pathfinder)

Texas Army National Guard, 36th Airborne Brigade, 143rd Infantry Regiment, 1st Battalion

Texas Army National Guard, 36th Airborne Brigade, 143rd Infantry Regiment, 2nd Battalion

–US Army Alaska, 172nd Infantry Brigade (original version)
–101st Airborne Division, Screaming Eagle Replacement Training School

US Army Alaska, 172nd Infantry Brigade

US Army Alaska, 172nd Infantry Brigade, 9th Infantry Regiment, 4th Battalion

–US Army Alaska, 172nd Infantry Brigade, 23rd Infantry Regiment, 4th Battalion
–US Army Alaska, 172nd Infantry Brigade, 327th Infantry Regiment, 5th Battalion, Company C (original version)

US Army Alaska, 172nd Infantry Brigade, 60th Infantry Regiment, 1st Battalion

US Army Alaska, 172nd Infantry Brigade, 327th Infantry Regiment, 4th Battalion, Company C

US Army Alaska, 172nd Infantry Brigade, 327th Infantry Regiment, 5th Battalion, Company C

US Army Alaska, 172nd Infantry Brigade, 327th Infantry Regiment, 6th Battalion, Company C

US Army South, 193rd Infantry Brigade, 5th Infantry Regiment, 3rd Battalion, Company A

US Army South, 193rd Infantry Brigade, 187th Infantry Regiment, 2nd Battalion

–US Army Southern European Task Force, 325th Infantry Regiment, 3rd Battalion
–82nd Airborne Division, 2nd Brigade Combat Team, 325th Infantry Regiment, 3rd Battalion

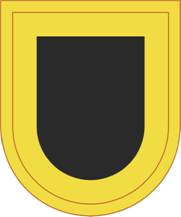
US Army Southern European Task Force, 509th Infantry Regiment, 1st Battalion (original version)

USASOC, 75th Ranger Regiment (original version)

USASOC, 75th Ranger Regiment, 1st Battalion (original version)

USASOC, 75th Ranger Regiment, 2nd Battalion (original version)

USASOC, 75th Ranger Regiment, 3rd Battalion (original version)

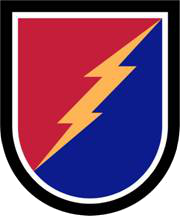
25th Infantry Division, 4th Brigade Combat Team

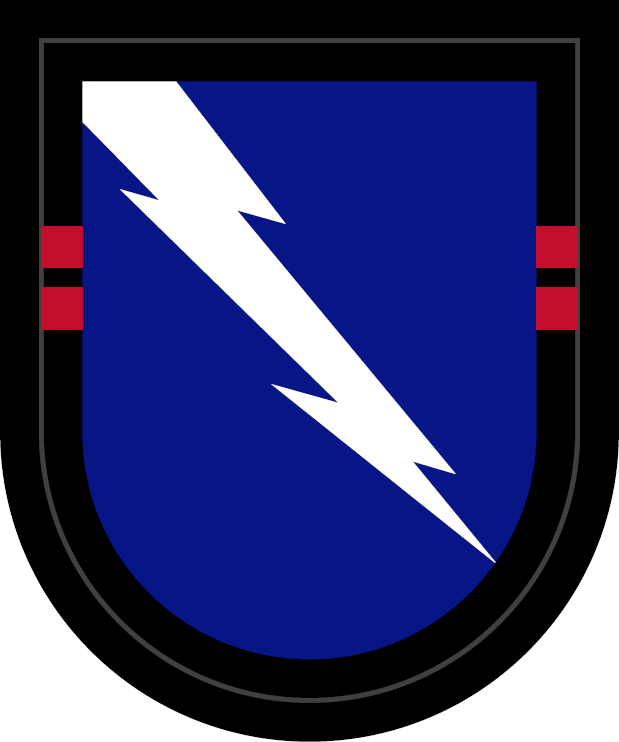
35th Infantry Division, 45th Brigade Combat Team, 134th Infantry Regiment, 2nd Battalion

82nd Airborne Division, 1st Brigade Combat Team (original version)

82nd Airborne Division, 2nd Brigade Combat Team (original version)

82nd Airborne Division, 2nd Brigade Combat Team, 325th Infantry Regiment, 4th Battalion

82nd Airborne Division, 3rd Brigade Combat Team (original version)

82nd Airborne Division, 3rd Brigade Combat Team, 505th Infantry Regiment, 3rd Battalion

82nd Airborne Division, 3rd Brigade Combat Team, 505th Infantry Regiment, 4th Battalion

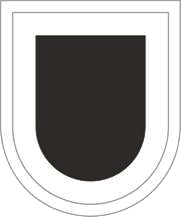
82nd Airborne Division, 4th Brigade Combat Team

101st Airborne Division, 1st Brigade (original version)

101st Airborne Division, 2nd Brigade (original version)

101st Airborne Division, 2nd Brigade, 506th Infantry Regiment, 1st Battalion (original version)

101st Airborne Division, 3rd Brigade (original version)

==== Medical ====
Beret flashes in this section may be obsolete.

USAREUR–AF, 30th Medical Brigade, 212th Combat Support Hospital, 67th Forward Resuscitative and Surgical Detachment

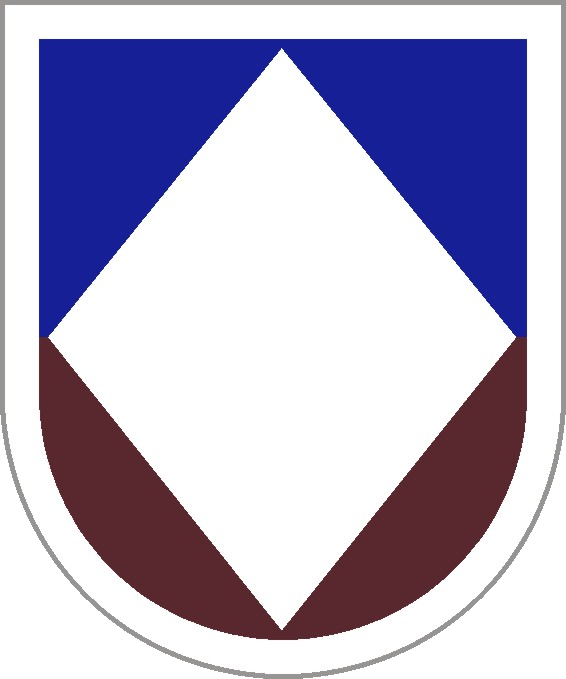
XVIII Airborne Corps, 44th Medical Brigade, 16th Hospital Center, 240th Forward Resuscitative and Surgical Detachment

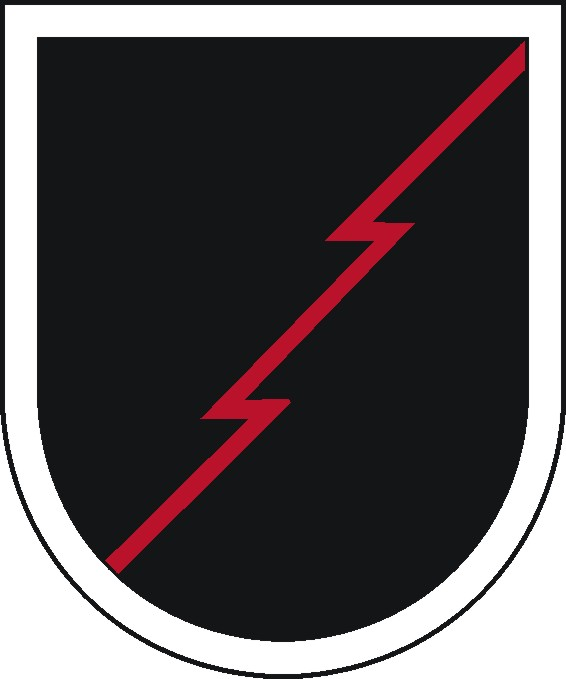
XVIII Airborne Corps, 44th Medical Brigade, 16th Hospital Center, 274th Forward Resuscitative and Surgical Detachment

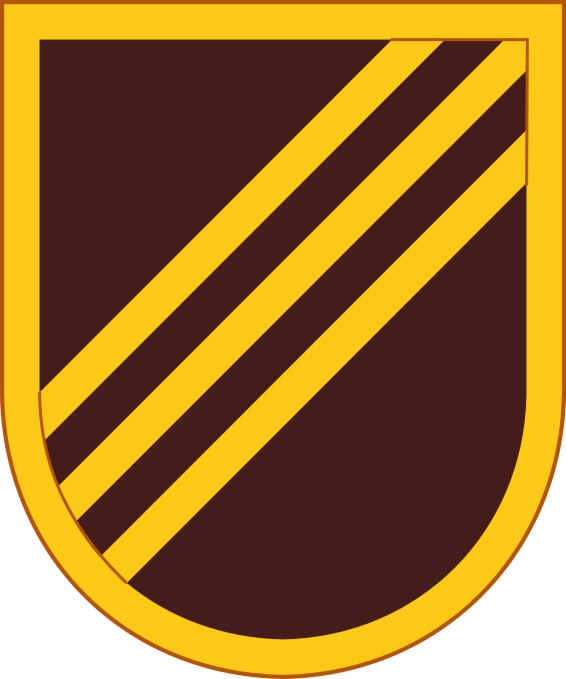
XVIII Airborne Corps, 44th Medical Brigade, 16th Hospital Center, 541st Forward Resuscitative and Surgical Detachment

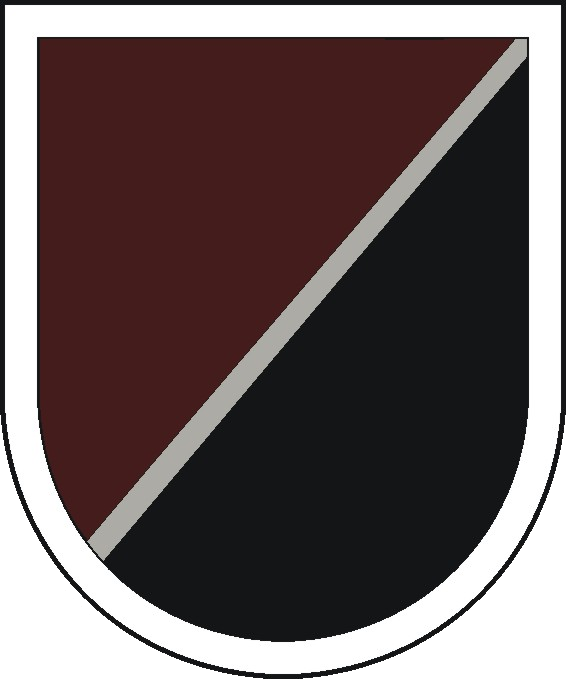
XVIII Airborne Corps, 44th Medical Brigade, 16th Hospital Center, 759th Forward Resuscitative and Surgical Detachment

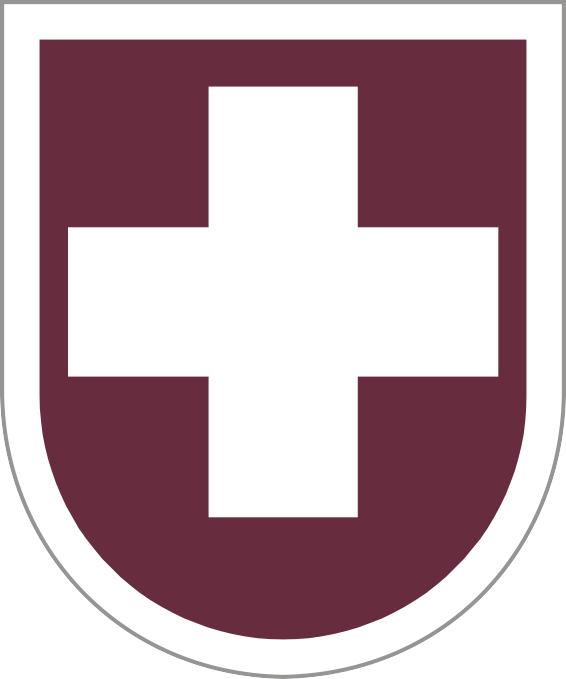
18th Medical Command, 8th Forward Resuscitative and Surgical Detachment

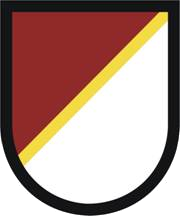
593rd Expeditionary Sustainment Command, 62nd Medical Brigade, 47th Combat Support Hospital, 250th Forward Resuscitative and Surgical Detachment

Obsolete

US Army Forces Command, 86th Combat Support Hospital

1st Cavalry Division Support Command, 15th Medical Battalion (original version)

1st Cavalry Division Support Command, 15th Medical Battalion

4th Infantry Division, 4th Medical Battalion, Company C

XVIII Airborne Corps, 44th Medical Brigade

82nd Airborne Division, 307th Medical Battalion
—currently 82nd Airborne Division, 1st Brigade Combat Team, 307th Brigade Support Battalion

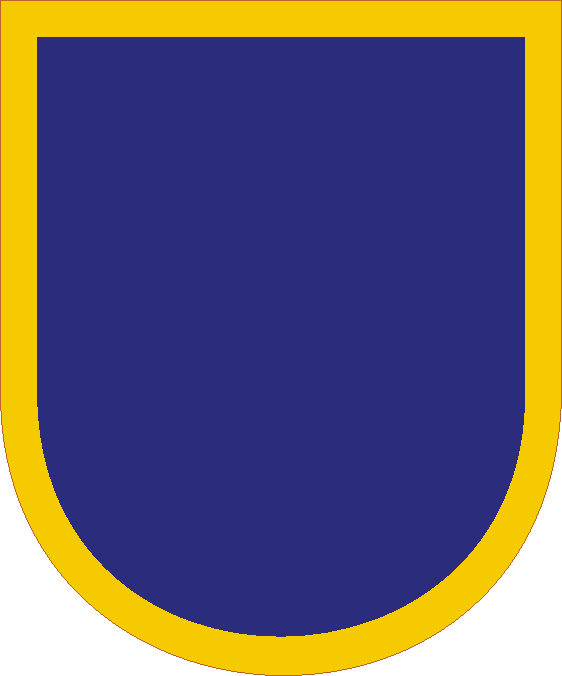
593rd Expeditionary Sustainment Command, 62nd Medical Brigade, 47th Combat Support Hospital, 250th Medical Detachment

==== Military intelligence ====
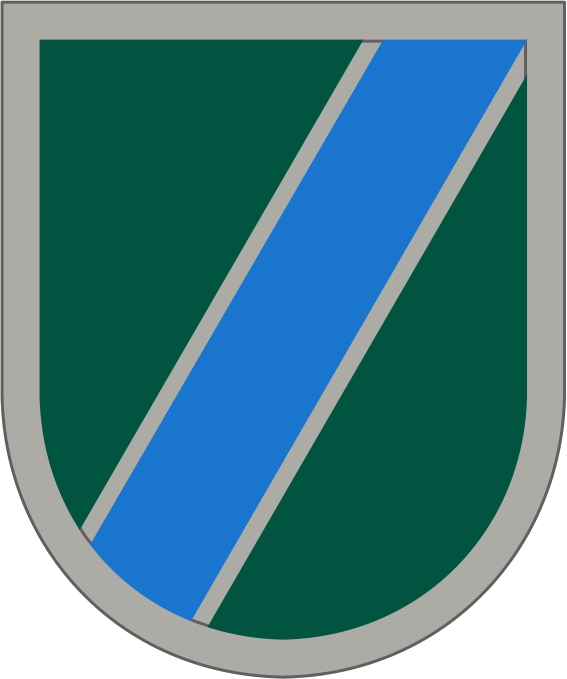
1st Special Forces Command, 528th Sustainment Brigade, 389th Military Intelligence Battalion

Obsolete

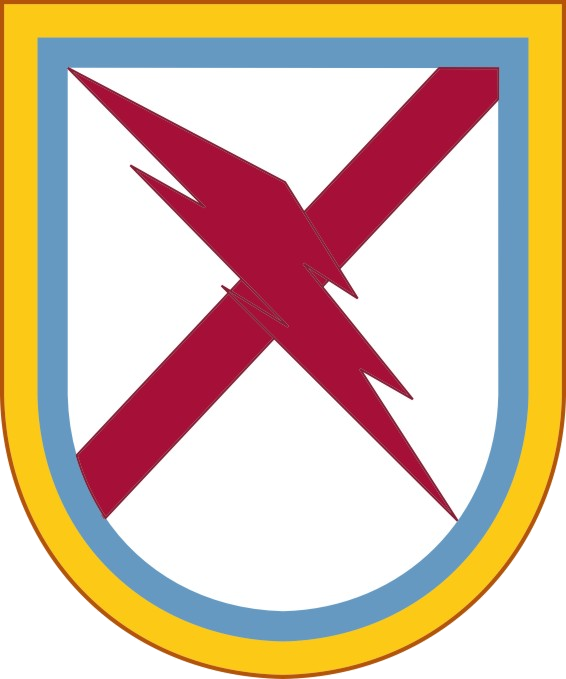
–Alabama Army National Guard, 62nd Troop Command, 173rd Infantry Regiment, 1st Battalion, Company E (Long-Range Surveillance)
–Alabama Army National Guard, 142nd BfSB, 131st Cavalry Regiment, 1st Squadron, Troop C (Long-Range Surveillance)

Alaska Army National Guard, 207th Infantry Group, Headquarters and Headquarters Company, Arctic Light Reconnaissance Detachment

Alaska Army National Guard, 297th BfSB, 297th Cavalry Regiment, 1st Battalion, Troop C (Long-Range Surveillance)

–Georgia Army National Guard, 121st Infantry Regiment, Company H (Long-Range Surveillance)
–Georgia Army National Guard, 560th BfSB, 108th Cavalry Regiment, 3rd Squadron, 121st Infantry Regiment, Company H (Long-Range Surveillance)

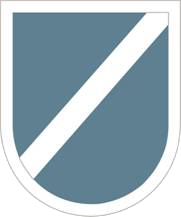
–Indiana Army National Guard, 219th BfSB, 152nd Cavalry Regiment, 2nd Squadron, Troop C (Long-Range Surveillance)
–38th Infantry Division, 151st Infantry Regiment, Company D (Long-Range Surveillance)
–Indiana Army National Guard, 151st Infantry Regiment, Company D (Ranger)

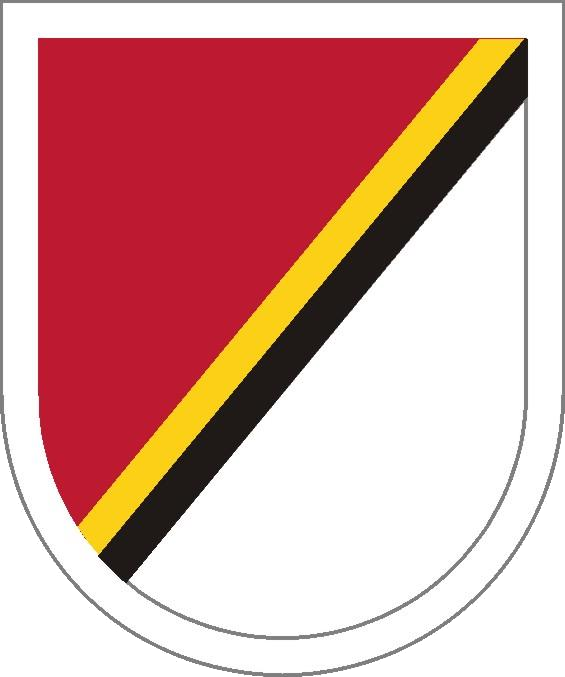
Maryland Army National Guard, 58th BfSB, 158th Cavalry Regiment, 1st Squadron, Troop C (Long-Range Surveillance)

Michigan Army National Guard, 425th Infantry Regiment, Company F (Long-Range Surveillance)

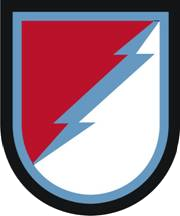
Texas Army National Guard, 71st BfSB, 124th Cavalry Regiment, 3rd Squadron, Troop C (Long-Range Surveillance)

–Texas Army National Guard, 143rd Infantry Regiment, Company G (Long-Range Surveillance)
–Texas Army National Guard, 143rd Infantry Regiment, Company G (Ranger)

Texas Army National Guard, 1136th Infantry Detachment (Long-Range Surveillance)

US Army Europe, 66th Military Intelligence Brigade, 105th Military Intelligence Battalion, Long-Range Surveillance Detachment

USAREUR–AF, 173rd Airborne Brigade, 74th Infantry Detachment (Long-Range Surveillance)

US Army South, 470th Military Intelligence Brigade, 14th Military Intelligence Battalion, Company C (Long-Range Surveillance)

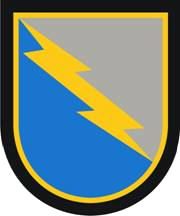
I Corps, 201st BfSB, 38th Cavalry Regiment, Troop C (Long-Range Surveillance)

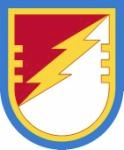
I Corps, 201st BfSB, 38th Cavalry Regiment, 3rd Squadron, Troop C (Long-Range Surveillance)

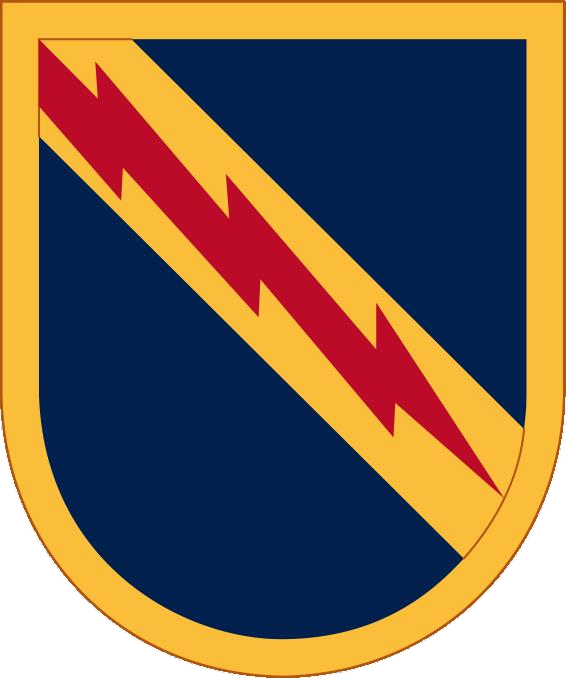
I Corps, 201st BfSB, 109th Military Intelligence Battalion, 52nd Infantry Regiment, Company C (Long-Range Surveillance)

1st Cavalry Division, 312th Military Intelligence Battalion, Long-Range Surveillance Detachment

1st Infantry Division, 101st Military Intelligence Battalion, Company D, Long-Range Surveillance Detachment

–1st Special Forces, 19th Special Forces Group, 297th Military Intelligence Company
–XVIII Airborne Corps, 525th Military Intelligence Brigade, 337th Military Intelligence Battalion

2nd Armored Division, 303rd Army Security Agency Battalion

2nd Infantry Division, 2nd Division Support Group, 102nd Military Intelligence Battalion, Long-Range Surveillance Detachment

III Corps, 504th BfSB, 38th Cavalry Regiment, 2nd Squadron, Troop C (Long-Range Surveillance) (original version)

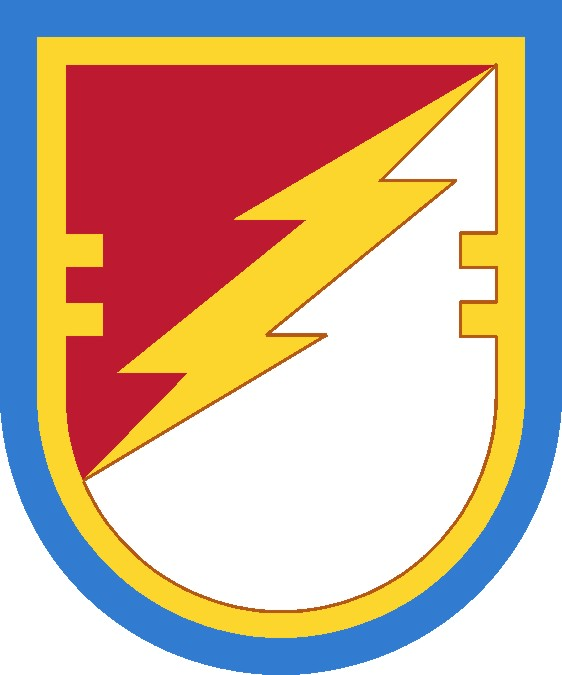
III Corps, 504th BfSB, 38th Cavalry Regiment, 2nd Squadron, Troop C (Long-Range Surveillance)

III Corps, 504th Military Intelligence Brigade, 163rd Military Intelligence Battalion, Long-Range Surveillance Detachment (original version)

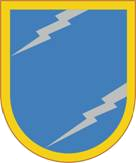
III Corps, 504th Military Intelligence Brigade, 163rd Military Intelligence Battalion, Long-Range Surveillance Detachment

3rd Infantry Division, 103rd Military Intelligence Battalion, Long-Range Surveillance Detachment

4th Infantry Division, 104th Military Intelligence Battalion, Long-Range Surveillance Detachment

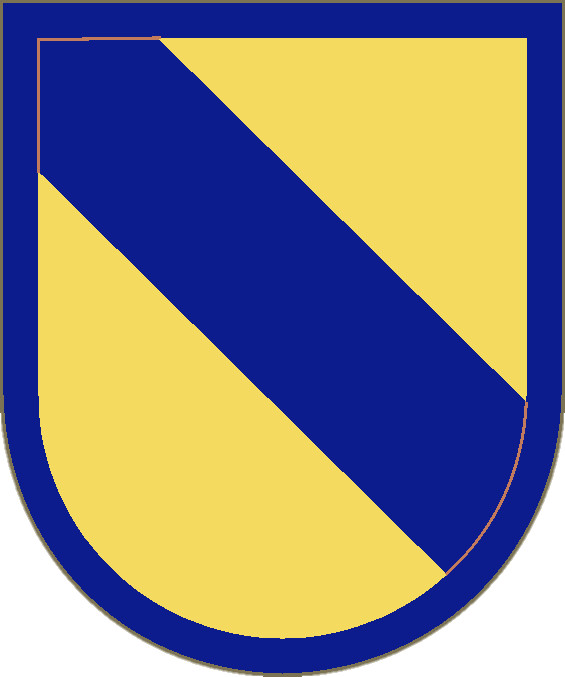
–V Corps, 205th BfSB, 51st Infantry Regiment, Company E (Long-Range Surveillance)
–XVIII Airborne Corps, 525th BfSB, 51st Infantry Regiment, Company F (Long-Range Surveillance)

6th Infantry Division, 106th Military Intelligence Battalion, Company C, Long-Range Surveillance Detachment

7th Infantry Division, 107th Military Intelligence Battalion, Long-Range Surveillance Detachment

8th Infantry Division, 108th Military Intelligence Battalion, Long-Range Surveillance Detachment

9th Infantry Division, 109th Military Intelligence Battalion, Company E, Long-Range Surveillance Detachment

10th Mountain Division, 110th Military Intelligence Battalion, Long-Range Surveillance Detachment

XVIII Airborne Corps, 525th Military Intelligence Brigade

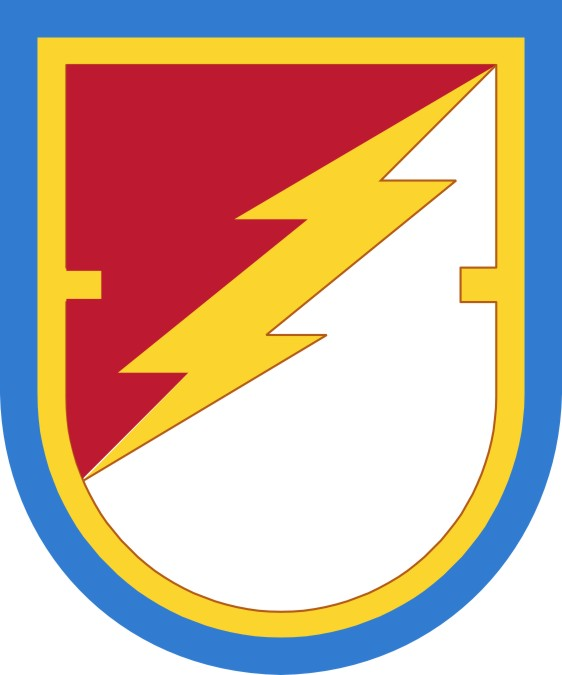
XVIII Airborne Corps, 525th BfSB, 38th Cavalry Regiment, 1st Squadron, Troop C (Long-Range Surveillance)

24th Infantry Division, 124th Military Intelligence Battalion, Long-Range Surveillance Detachment

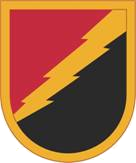
25th Infantry Division, Long-Range Surveillance Detachment

25th Infantry Division, 125th Military Intelligence Battalion, Long-Range Surveillance Detachment

26th Infantry Division, 173rd Infantry Detachment (Long-Range Surveillance)

28th Infantry Division, 104th Infantry Detachment (Long-Range Surveillance) (original version)

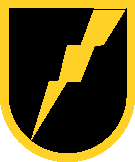
28th Infantry Division, 104th Infantry Detachment (Long-Range Surveillance)

–34th Infantry Division, 194th Infantry Detachment (Long-Range Surveillance)
–47th Infantry Division, 194th Infantry Detachment (Long-Range Surveillance)

35th Infantry Division, 167th Cavalry Regiment, 1st Squadron, Long-Range Surveillance Detachment

40th Infantry Division, 79th Brigade Combat Team, 18th Cavalry Regiment, 1st Squadron, Long-Range Surveillance Detachment

42nd Infantry Division, 27th Brigade Combat Team, 101st Cavalry Regiment, 2nd Squadron, Long-Range Surveillance Detachment

42nd Infantry Division, 117th Cavalry Regiment, 5th Squadron, Long-Range Surveillance Detachment

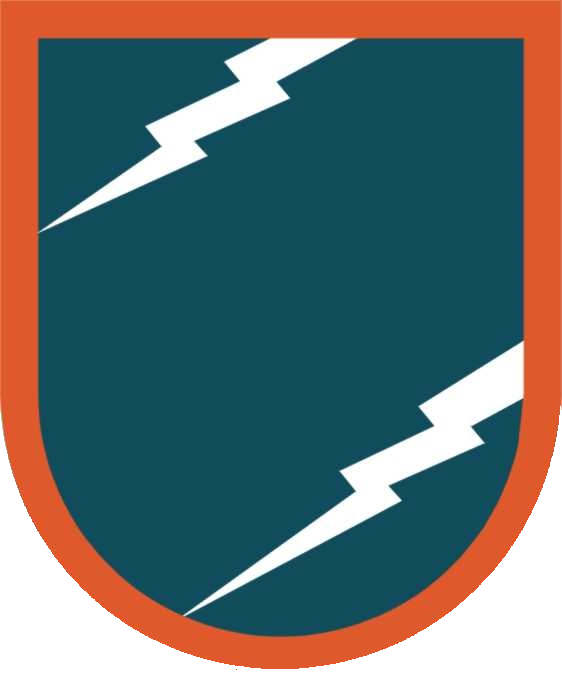
–82nd Airborne Division, 313th Military Intelligence Battalion
–US Army Forces Command, 313th Army Security Agency Battalion, 265th Army Security Agency Company

101st Airborne Division, 311th Military Intelligence Battalion, Long-Range Surveillance Detachment

==== Military police ====
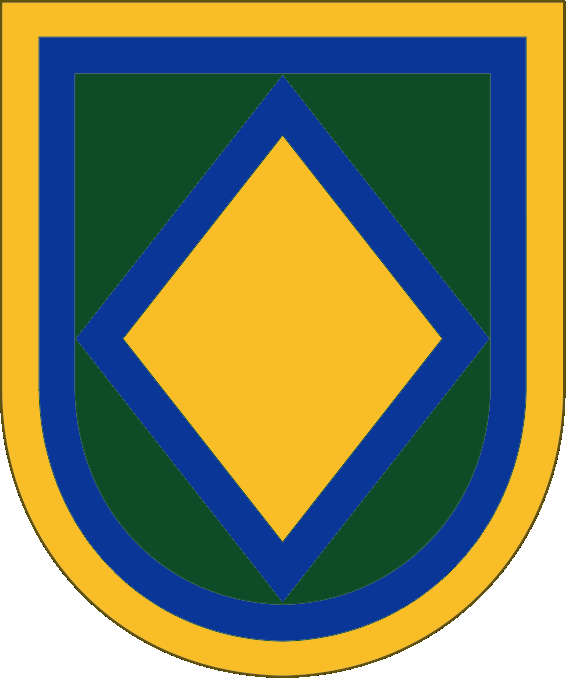
XVIII Airborne Corps, Headquarters and Headquarters Battalion, Fort Bragg Law Enforcement Company

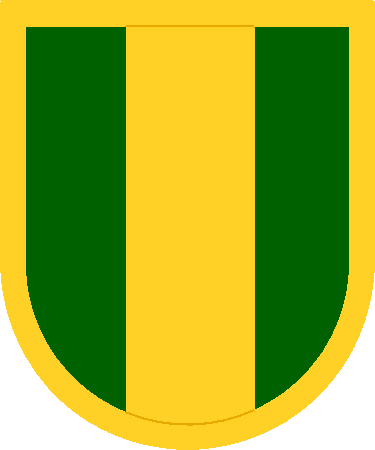
XVIII Airborne Corps, 16th Military Police Brigade, 503rd Military Police Battalion
—formerly XVIII Airborne Corps, 16th Military Police Brigade

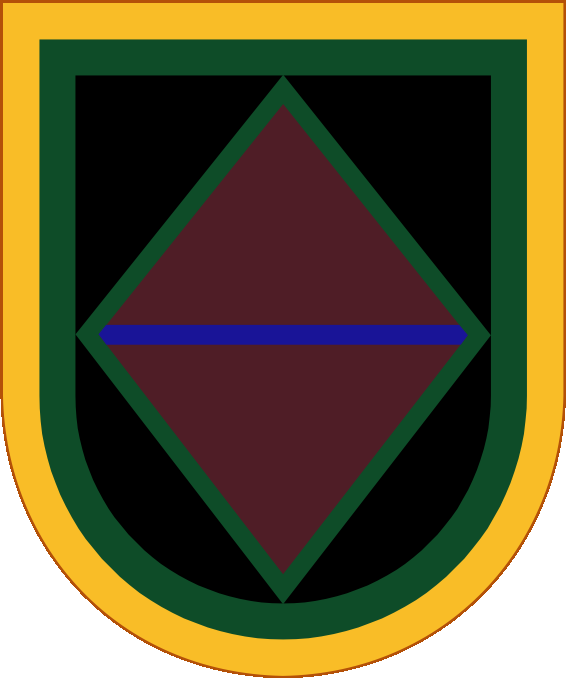
XVIII Airborne Corps, 16th Military Police Brigade, 503rd Military Police Battalion, 21st Military Police Company

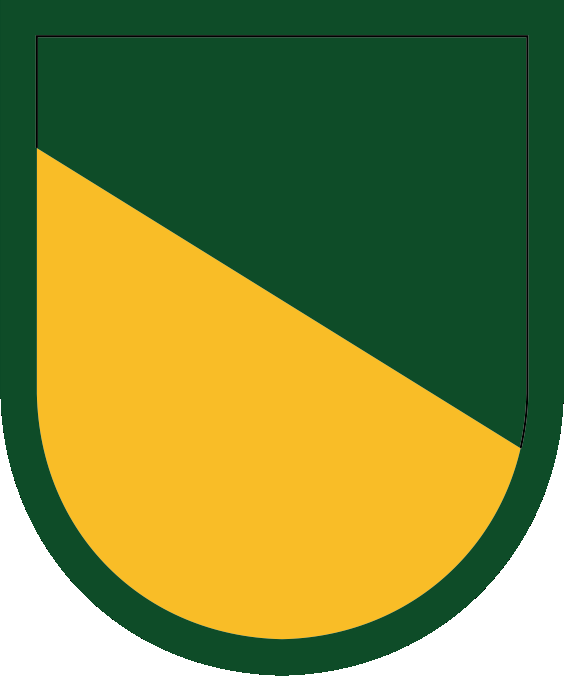
XVIII Airborne Corps, 16th Military Police Brigade, 503rd Military Police Battalion, 65th Military Police Company

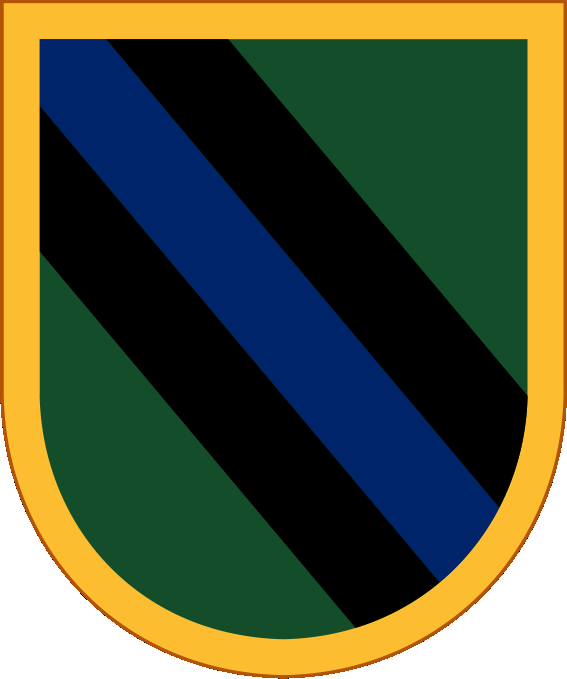
XVIII Airborne Corps, 16th Military Police Brigade, 503rd Military Police Battalion, 108th Military Police Company

Obsolete

US Army Alaska, Fort Wainwright, 472nd Military Police Company

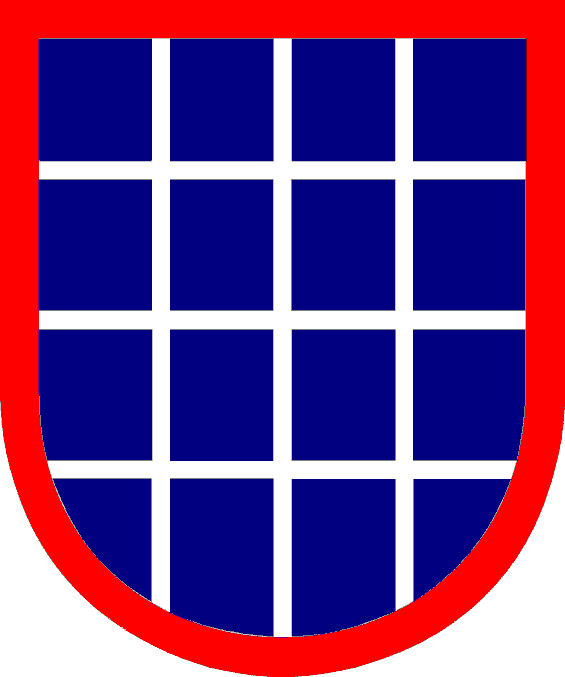
US Army Criminal Investigation Command, 3rd Military Police Group, 10th Military Police Battalion

–US Army Forces Command, 553rd Military Police Company
–101st Airborne Division, 101st Military Police Company

XVIII Airborne Corps, 16th Military Police Group

==== Multidisciplinary commands ====
Allied Special Operations Forces Command
—formerly Supreme Headquarters Allied Powers Europe, North Atlantic Treaty Organization Special Forces Headquarters

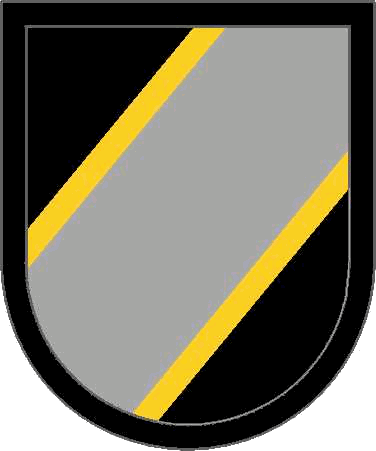
Joint Special Operations Command–Army Element

Rhode Island Army National Guard, 56th Troop Command

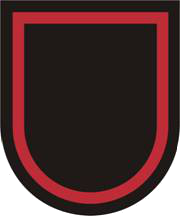
Special Operations Command Africa–Army Element

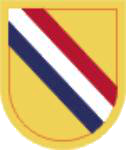
Special Operations Command Central–Army Element

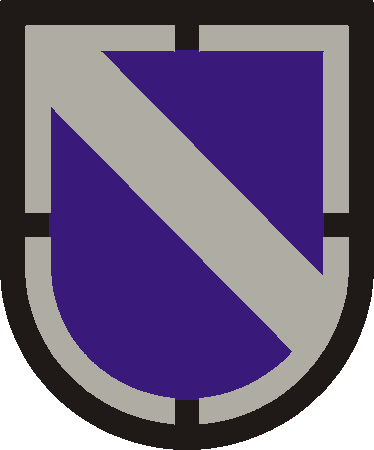
Special Operations Command Europe–Army Element

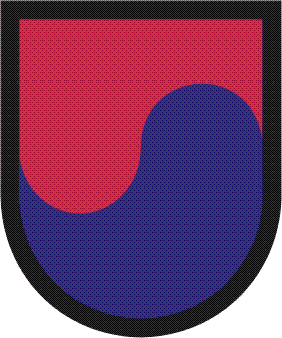
Special Operations Command Korea–Army Element

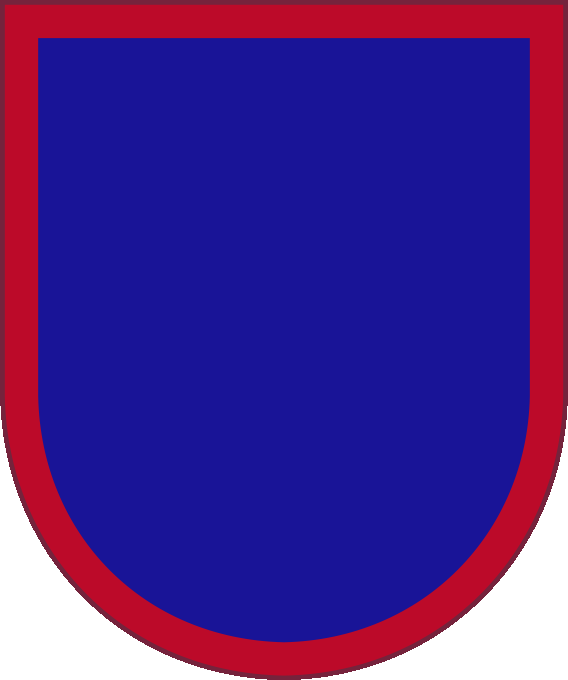
Special Operations Command North–Army Element

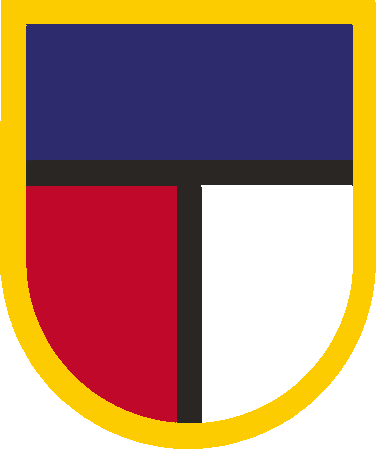
Special Operations Command Pacific–Army Element

Special Operations Command South–Army Element

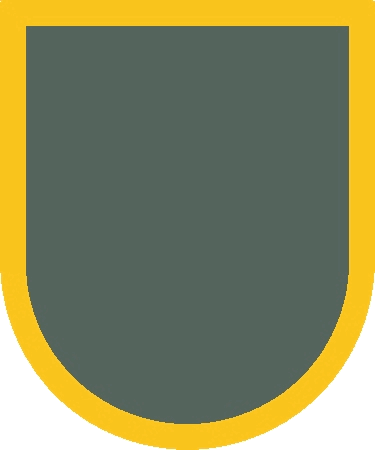
Supreme Headquarters Allied Powers Europe, Special Projects Branch–Army Element

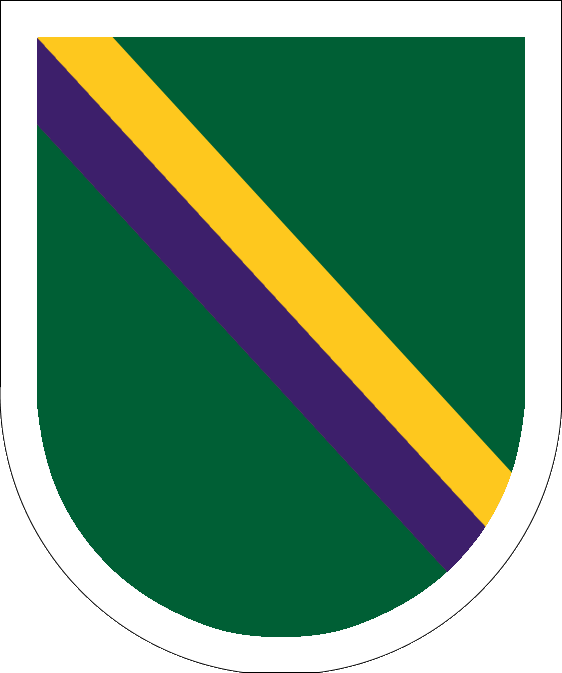
USACAPOC

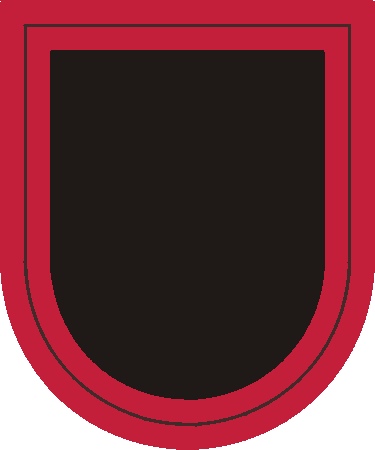
USASOC

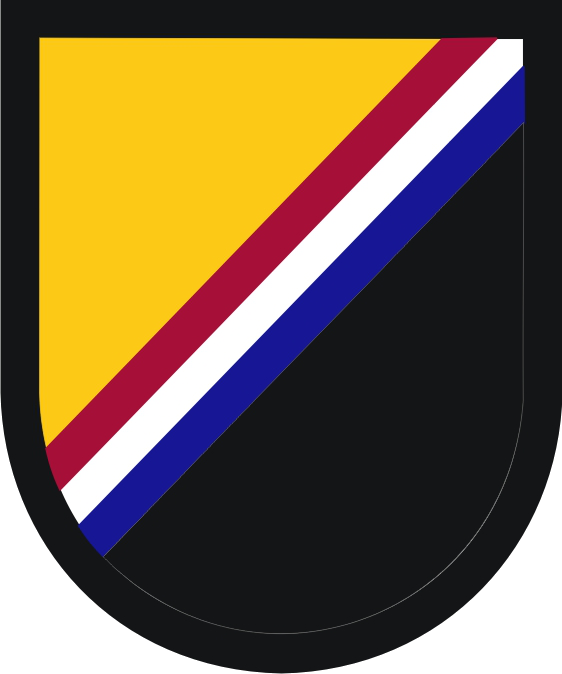
US Special Operations Command–Army Element

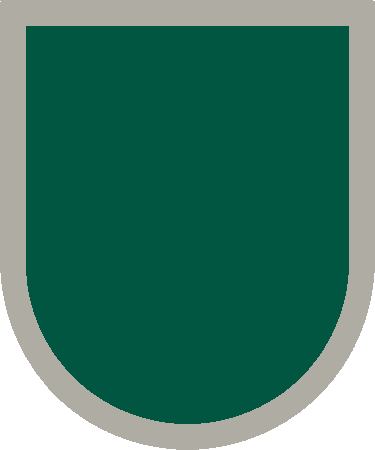
1st Special Forces Command
—formerly 1st Special Forces

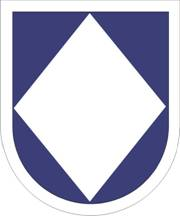
XVIII Airborne Corps

Obsolete

Puerto Rico National Guard Headquarters–Army Element (original version)

Puerto Rico National Guard Headquarters–Army Element
—currently Puerto Rico State Guard

Puerto Rico Army National Guard Headquarters, Command and Control

Puerto Rico Army National Guard, 292nd Area Command

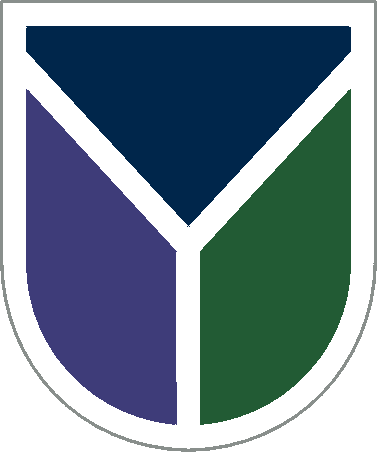
–Special Operations Command Atlantic–Army Element
–Special Operations Command Joint Forces–Army Element

Special Operations Command Central, Combined Joint Special Operations Task Force–Afghanistan

Special Operations Command Central, Combined Joint Special Operations Task Force–Arabian Peninsula

Special Operations Command East–Army Element

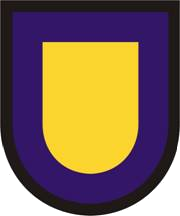
Special Operations Task Force Europe–Army Element

US Army Forces Command

US Army Forces Command, Joint Task Force Deployable

US Army Futures Command
—currently US Army Combat Capabilities Development Command, Soldier Center

US Army Pacific, Early Entry Command Post (US Army Alaska)

US Army Reserve Special Operations Command

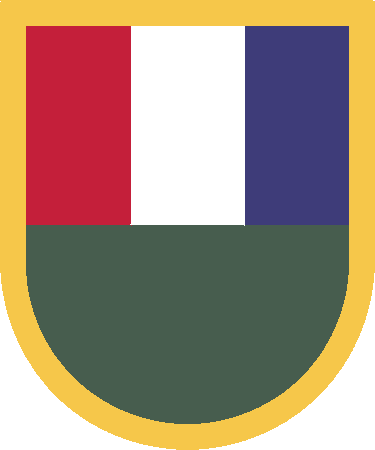
US Army Southern European Task Force

US Southern Command, Joint Task Force–Bravo

1st Special Operations Command

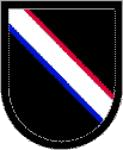
3rd Special Operations Support Command

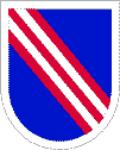
4th Special Operations Support Command

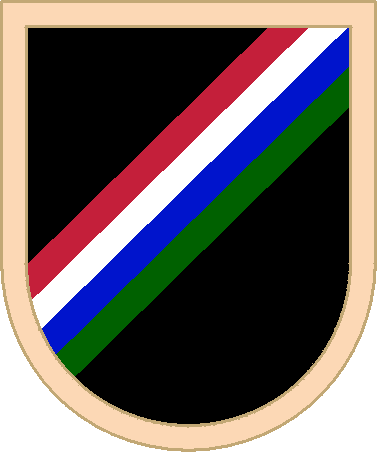
5th Special Operations Support Command

6th Special Operations Support Command (original version)

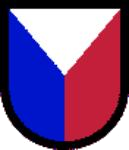
6th Special Operations Support Command

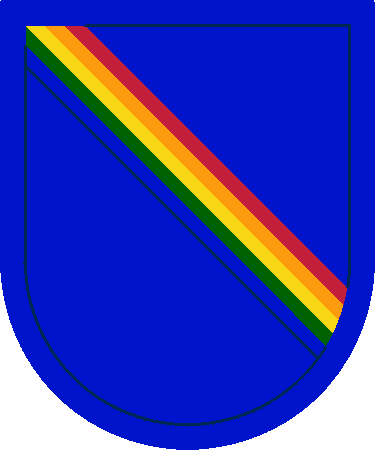
7th Special Operations Support Command

==== Ordnance ====
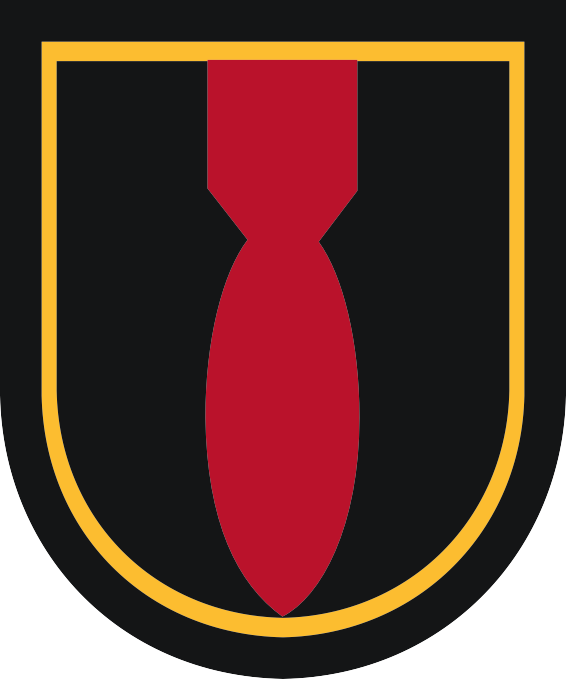
20th Chemical, Biological, Radiological, Nuclear, and high-yield Explosives (CBRNE) Command, 52nd Ordnance Group, 192nd Ordnance Battalion, 28th Ordnance Company

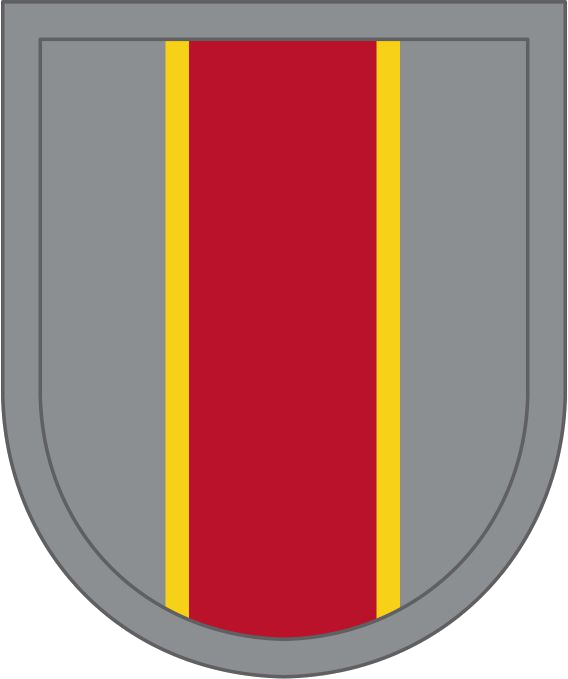
20th CBRNE Command, 52nd Ordnance Group, 192nd Ordnance Battalion, 722nd Ordnance Company

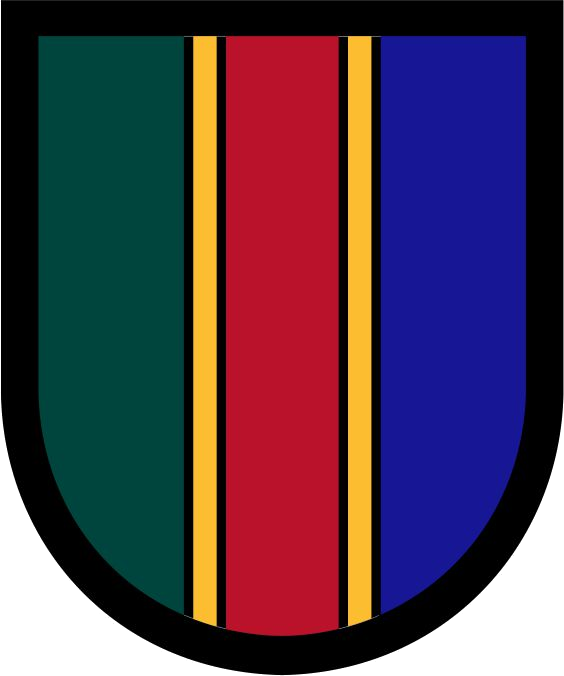
20th CBRNE Command, 52nd Ordnance Group, 192nd Ordnance Battalion, 767th Ordnance Company

==== Psychological operations ====
USACAPOC, 2nd Psychological Operations (PSYOP) Group, 15th PSYOP Battalion, 310th Tactical PSYOP Company

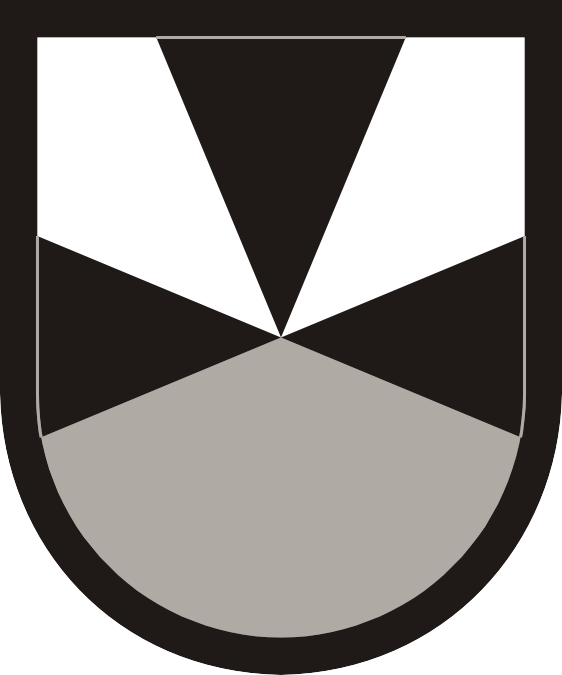
USACAPOC, 2nd PSYOP Group, 15th PSYOP Battalion, 325th Tactical PSYOP Company

USACAPOC, 2nd PSYOP Group, 15th PSYOP Battalion, 340th PSYOP Company

USACAPOC, 2nd PSYOP Group, 15th PSYOP Battalion, 346th Tactical PSYOP Company

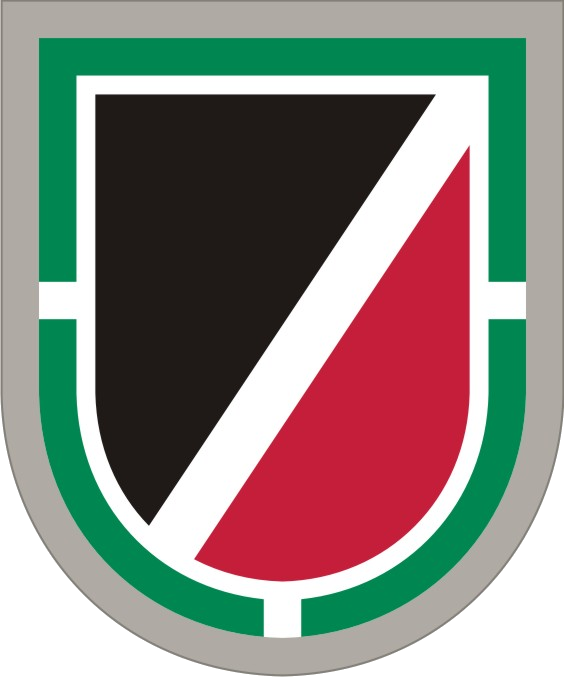
USACAPOC, 7th PSYOP Group, 14th PSYOP Battalion, 301st Tactical PSYOP Company

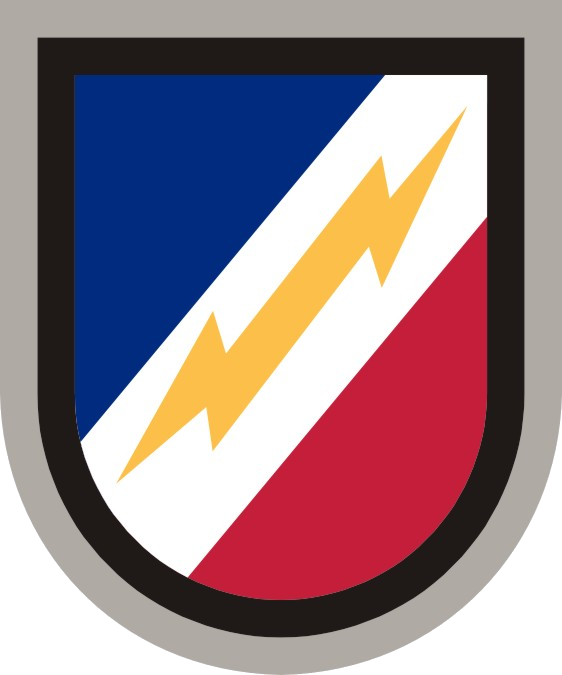
USACAPOC, 7th PSYOP Group, 17th PSYOP Battalion, 344th Tactical PSYOP Company

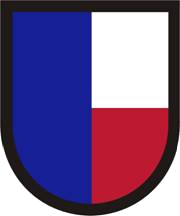
USACAPOC, 7th PSYOP Group, 17th PSYOP Battalion, 345th Tactical PSYOP Company

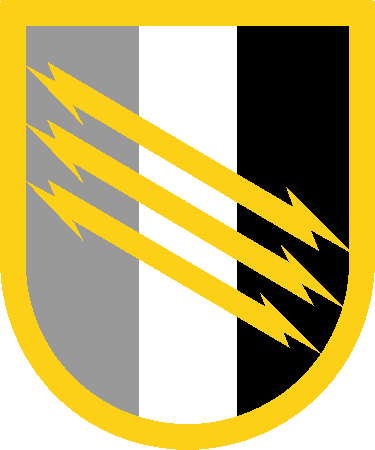
1st Special Forces Command, 4th PSYOP Group

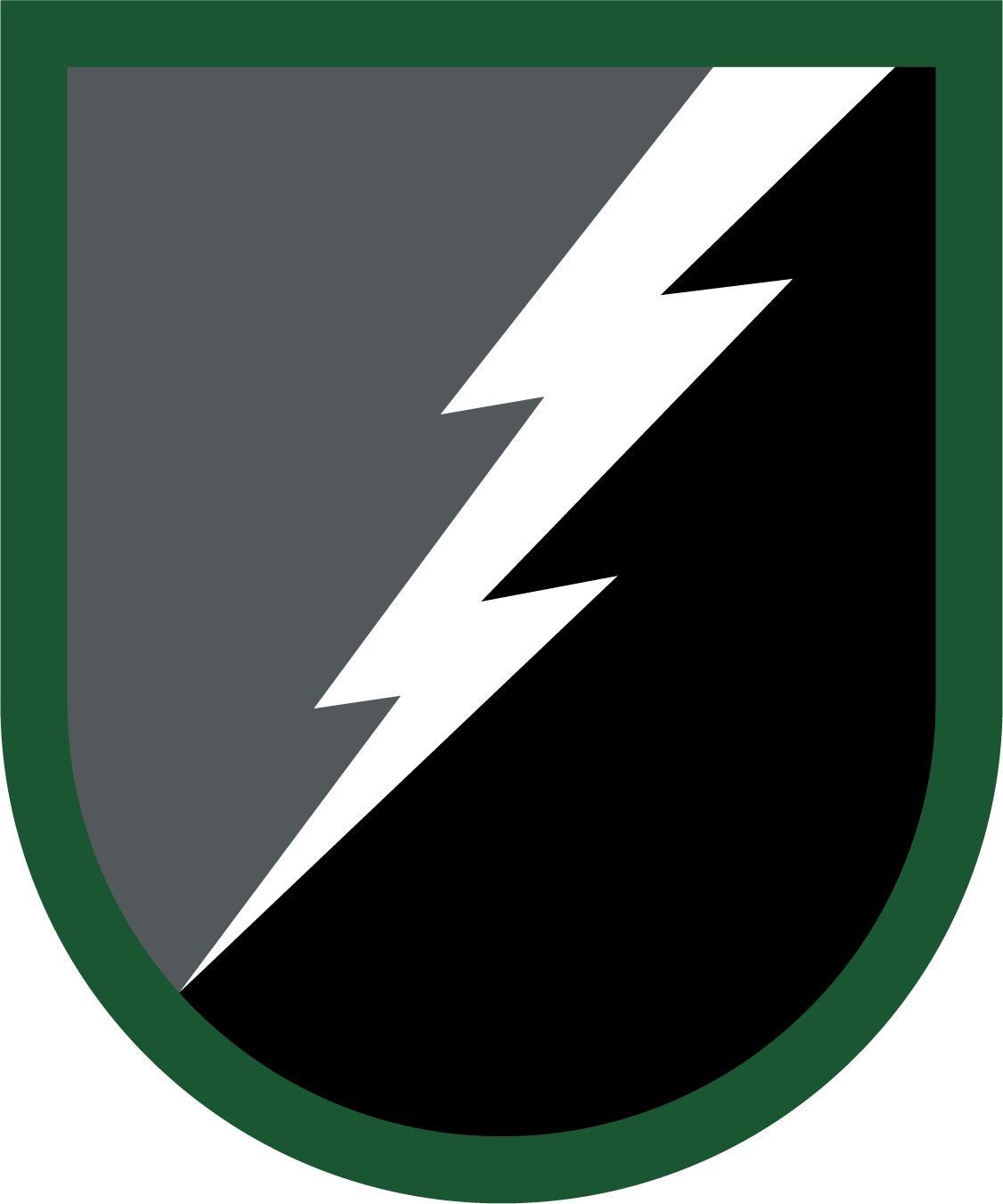
1st Special Forces Command, 4th PSYOP Group, 1st PSYOP Battalion

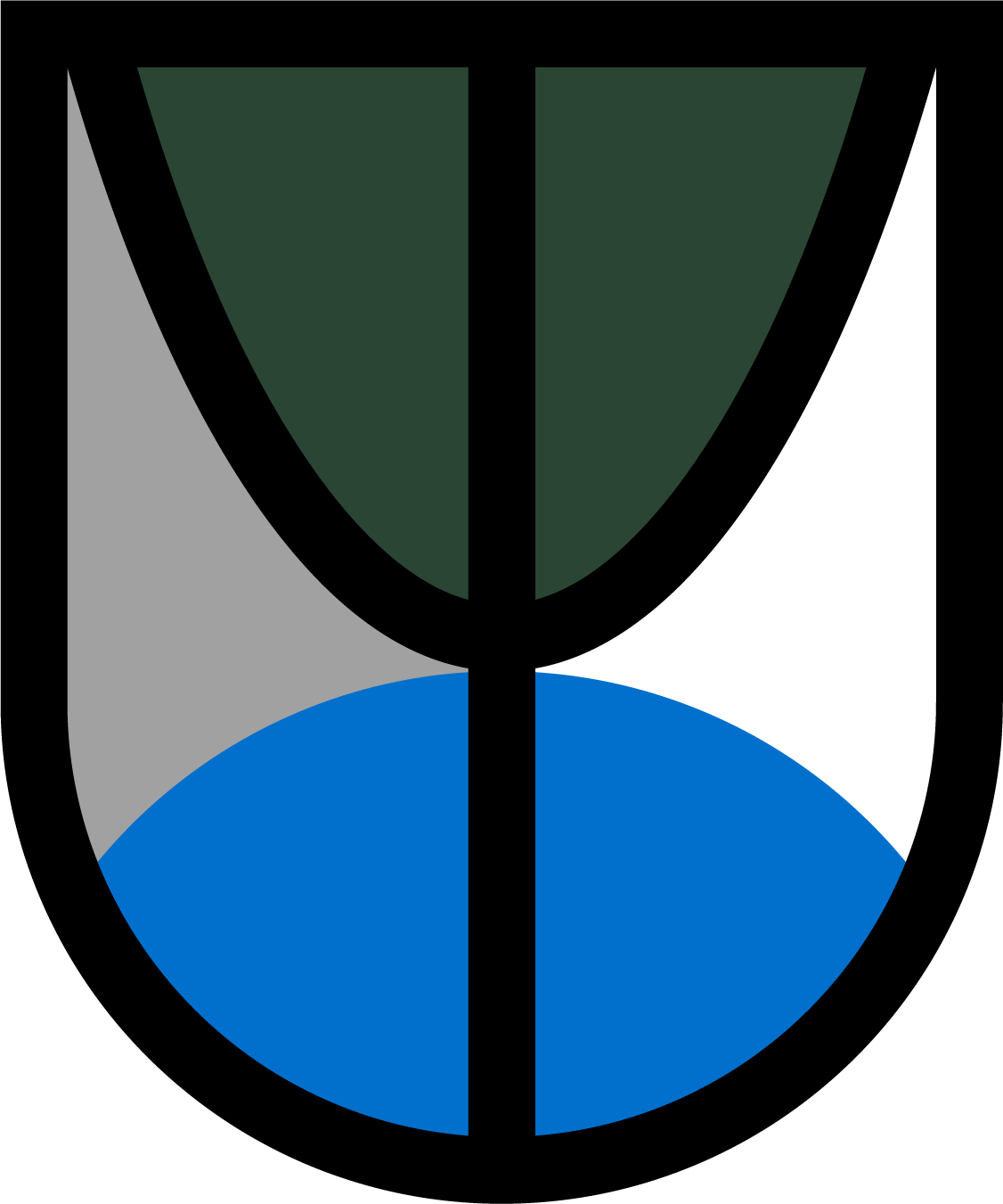
1st Special Forces Command, 4th PSYOP Group, 5th PSYOP Battalion

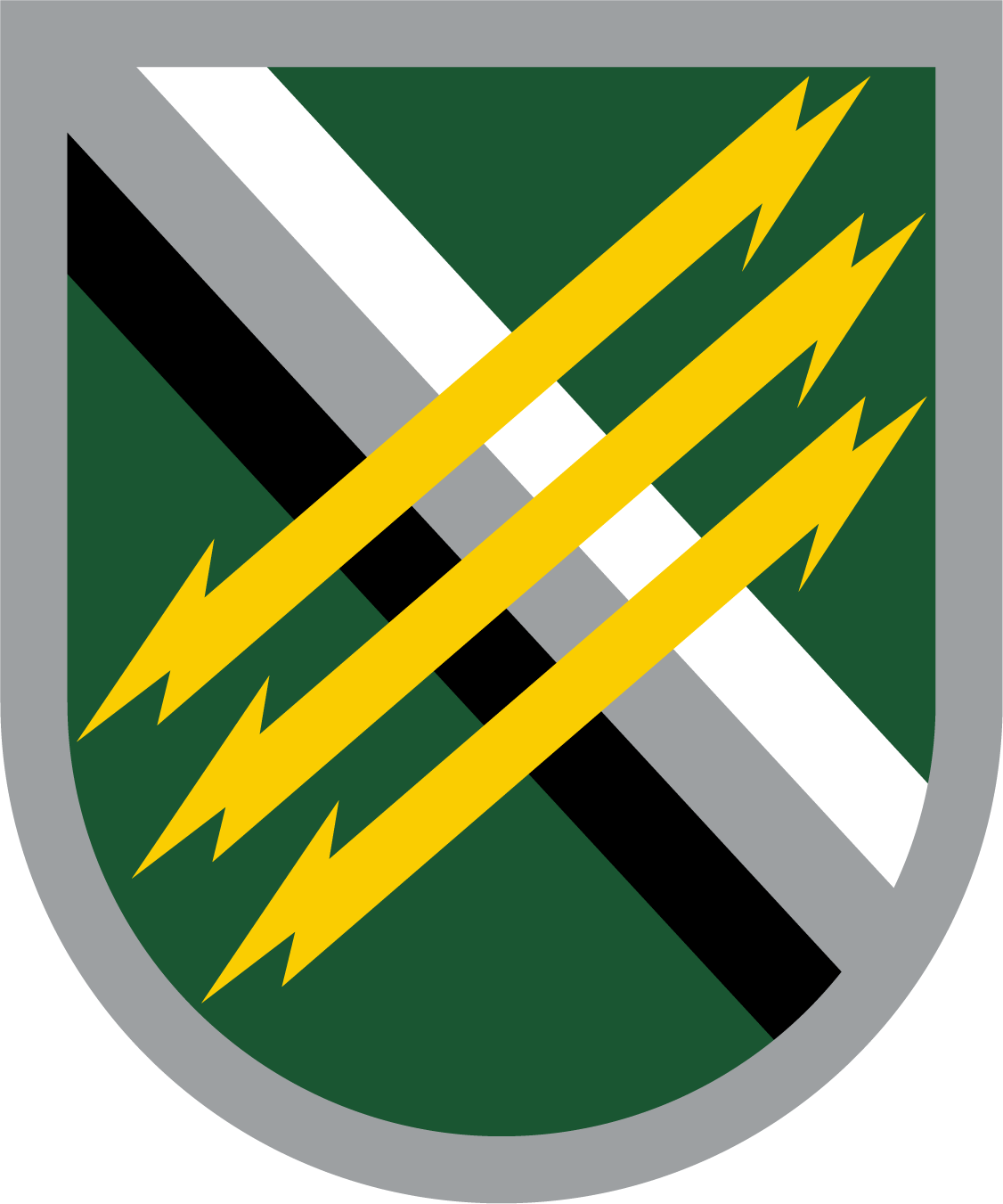
1st Special Forces Command, 4th PSYOP Group, 6th PSYOP Battalion

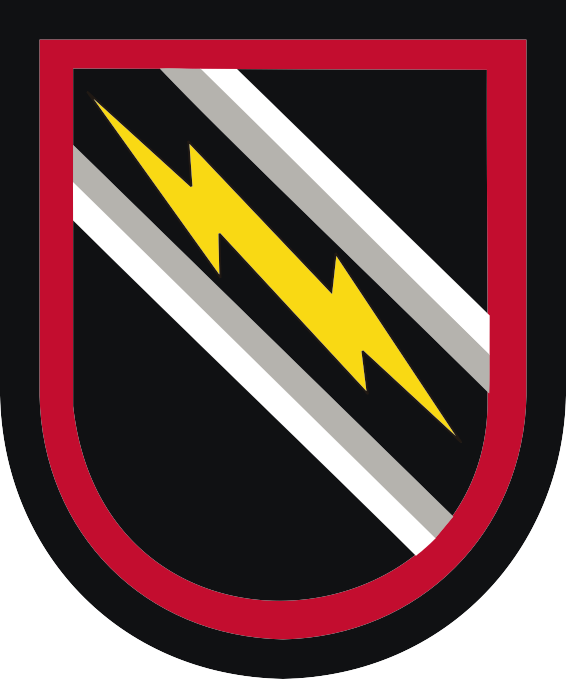
1st Special Forces Command, 4th PSYOP Group, 7th PSYOP Battalion

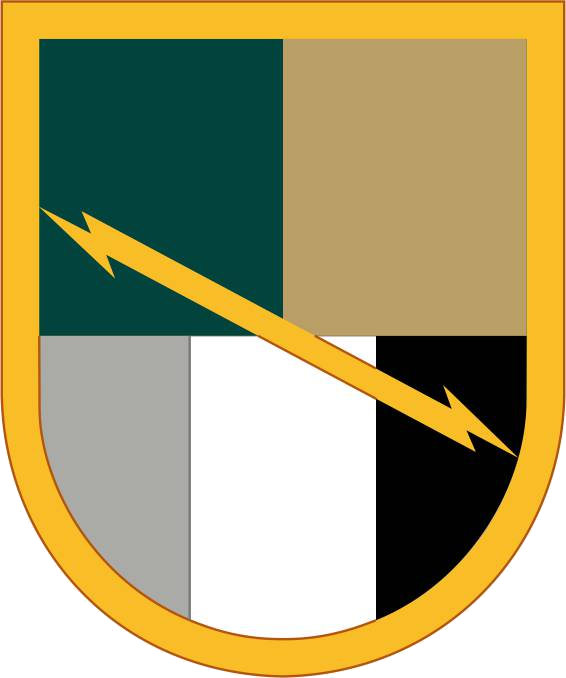
1st Special Forces Command, 4th PSYOP Group, 8th PSYOP Battalion

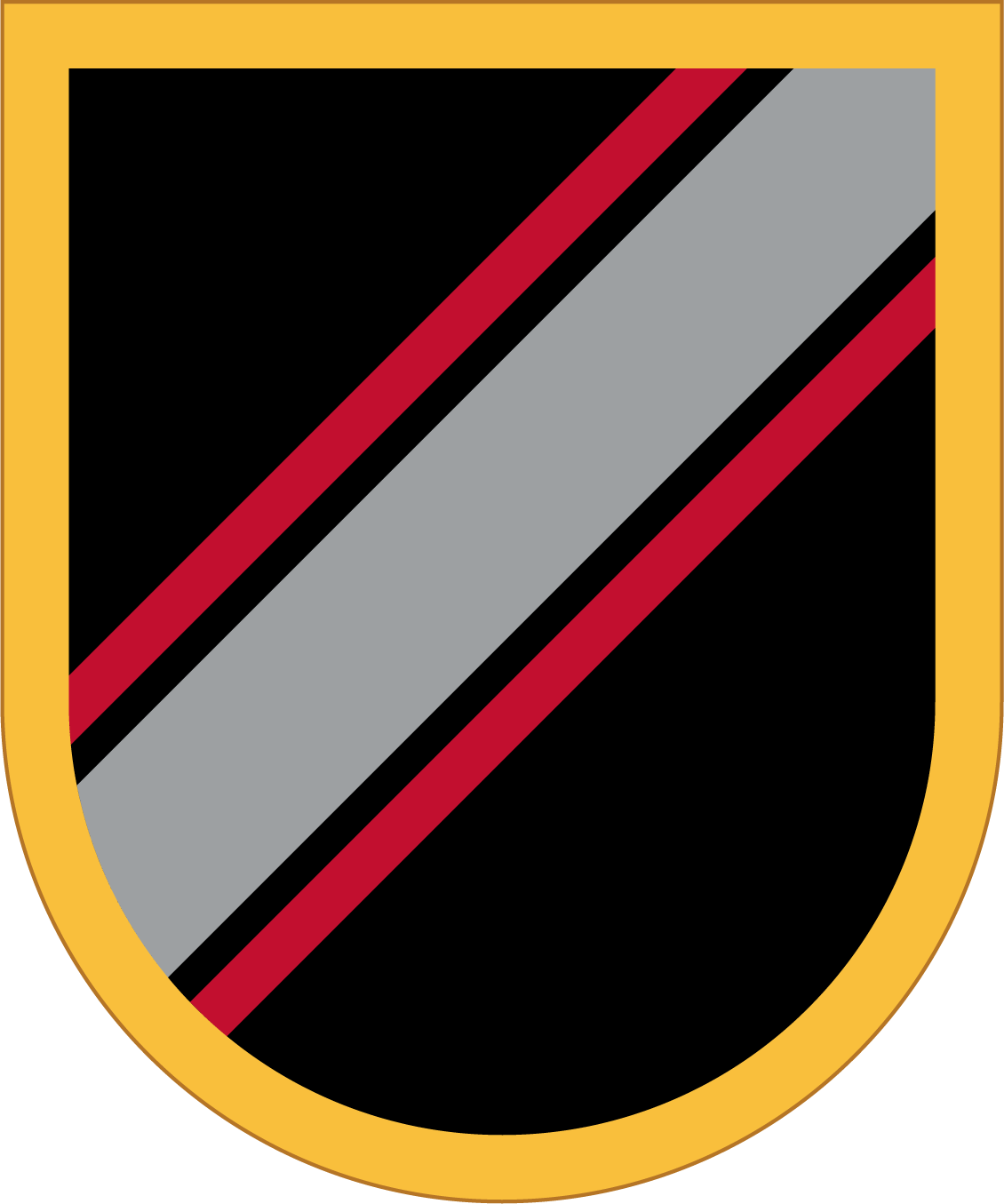
1st Special Forces Command, 4th PSYOP Group, 9th PSYOP Battalion Echelon suspected

Obsolete

USACAPOC, 2nd PSYOP Group, 15th PSYOP Battalion, 325th Tactical PSYOP Company (original version)

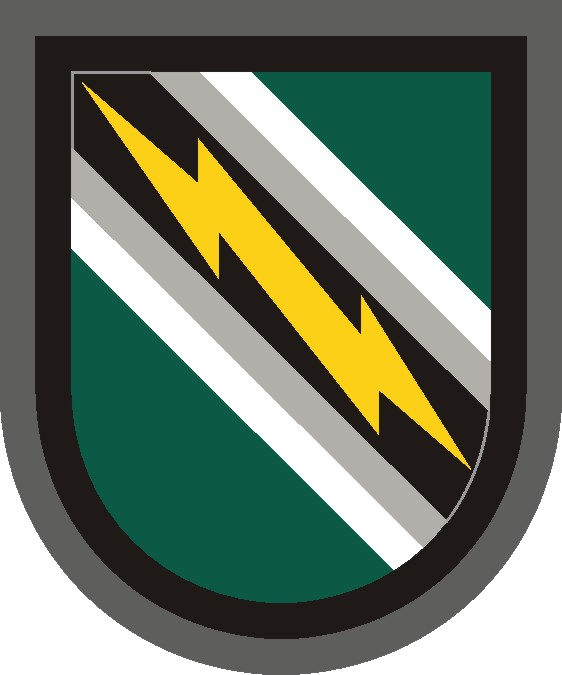
1st Special Forces Command, 8th PSYOP Group

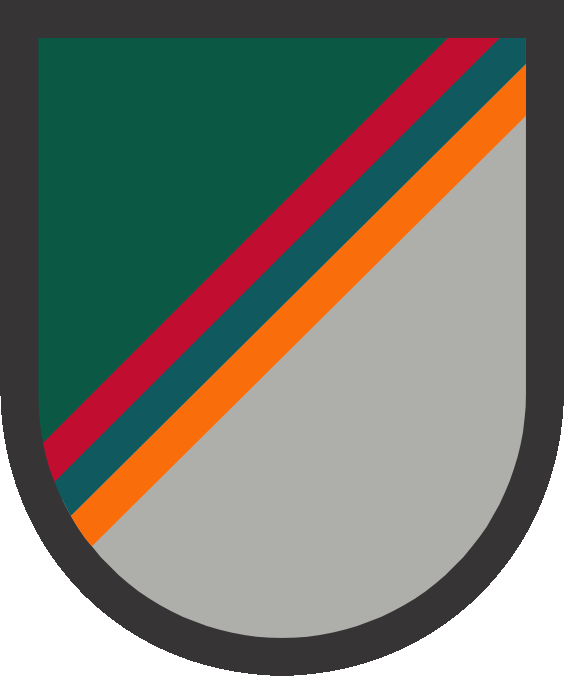
1st Special Forces Command, 8th PSYOP Group, 3rd PSYOP Battalion

==== Public affairs ====
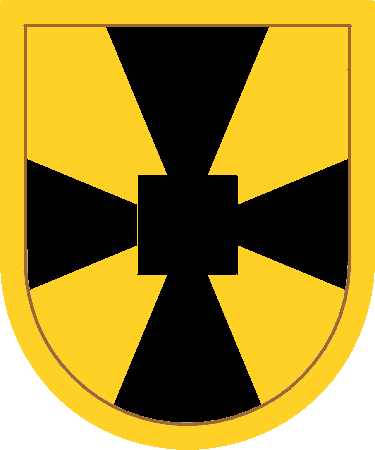
US Army Recruiting Command, Marketing and Engagement Brigade, US Army Parachute Team

Obsolete

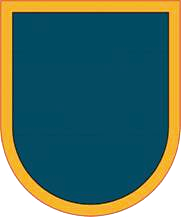
82nd Airborne Division, 49th Public Affairs Detachment

==== Signal ====
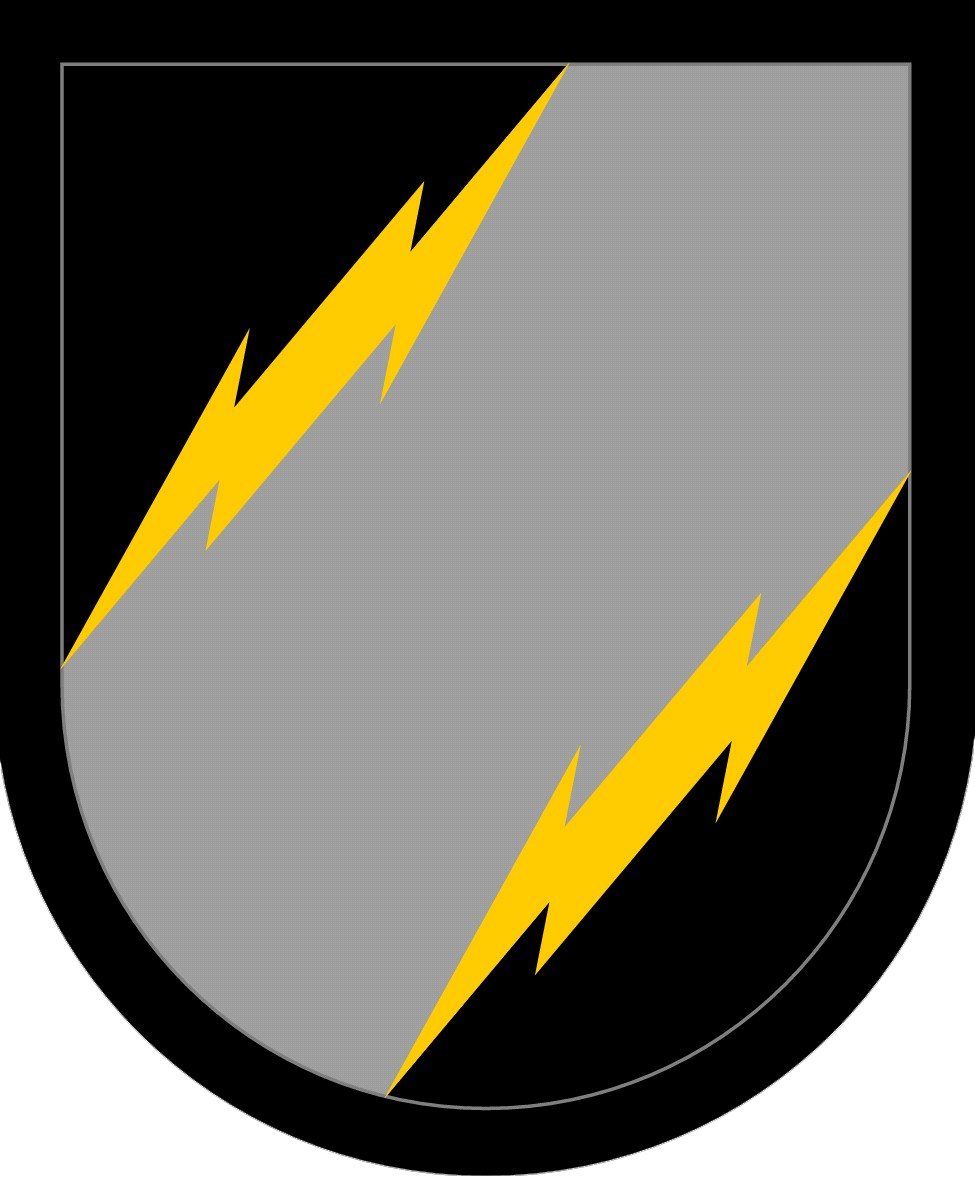
Joint Special Operations Command, Joint Communications Unit–Army element

1st Special Forces Command, 528th Sustainment Brigade, 112th Special Operations Signal Battalion

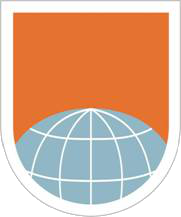
7th Signal Command, 21st Signal Brigade, 55th Signal Company

82nd Airborne Division, 82nd Signal Battalion

101st Airborne Division, 501st Division Signal Battalion

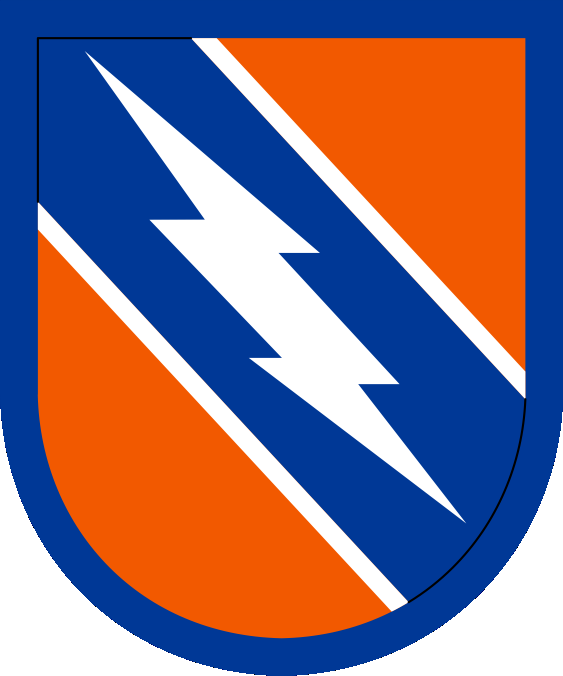
335th Theater Signal Command, 359th Signal Brigade, 982nd Signal Company

Obsolete

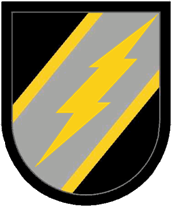
Joint Special Operations Command, Joint Communications Unit–Army element (original version)

US Army Communications–Electronics Command, Airborne Communications Electronics Board

US Army Communications–Electronics Command, Airborne, Electronics, and Special Warfare Board

1st Cavalry Division Support Command, 13th Signal Battalion

XVIII Airborne Corps, 35th Signal Brigade

–XVIII Airborne Corps, 35th Signal Group
–XVIII Airborne Corps, 35th Signal Brigade, 50th Signal Battalion

XVIII Airborne Corps, 35th Signal Brigade, 51st Signal Battalion

XVIII Airborne Corps, 35th Signal Brigade, 327th Signal Battalion (original version)

XVIII Airborne Corps, 35th Signal Brigade, 327th Signal Battalion

XVIII Airborne Corps, 35th Signal Brigade, 426th Signal Battalion

101st Airborne Division, 21st Division Signal Battalion

335th Theater Signal Command, 359th Signal Brigade, 982nd Signal Company (original version)

==== Special forces ====
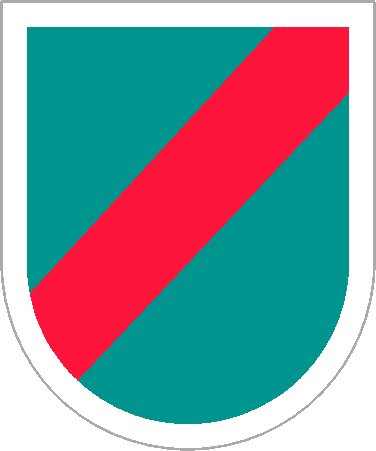
Alabama Army National Guard, 20th Special Forces Group

Joint US Military Advisory Group, Thailand–Special Forces Element
—formerly 1st Special Forces, 46th Special Forces Company

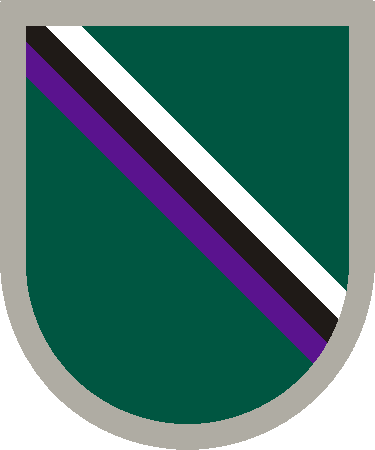
Special Forces (generic)

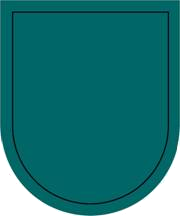
Utah Army National Guard, 19th Special Forces Group

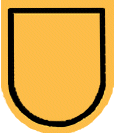
1st Special Forces Command, 1st Special Forces Group

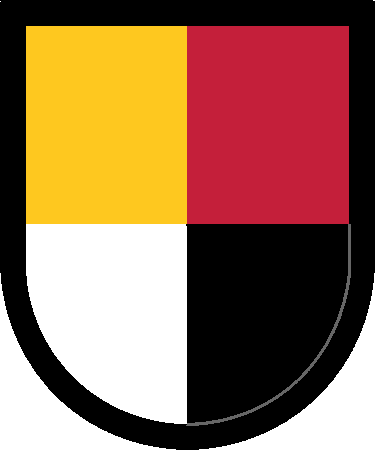
1st Special Forces Command, 3rd Special Forces Group

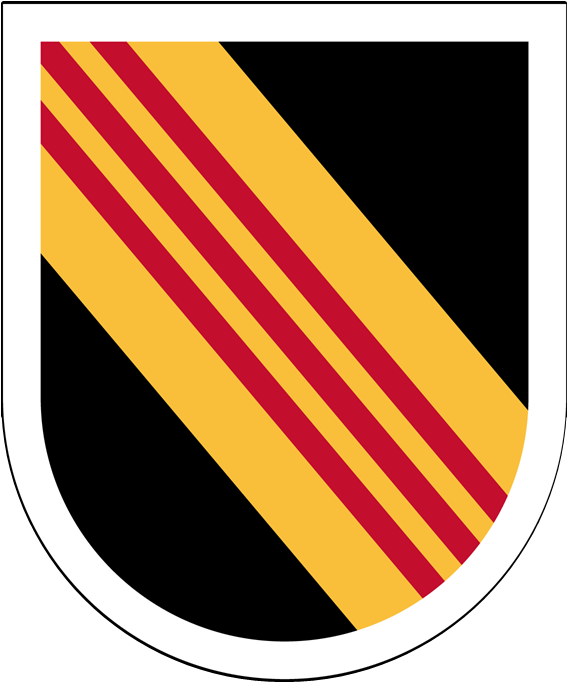
1st Special Forces Command, 5th Special Forces Group
—formerly 1st Special Forces, 5th Special Forces Group–Vietnam

1st Special Forces Command, 7th Special Forces Group

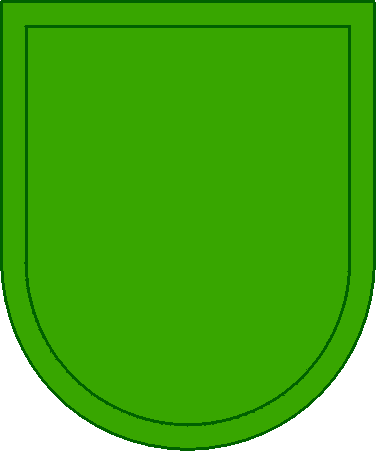
1st Special Forces Command, 10th Special Forces Group

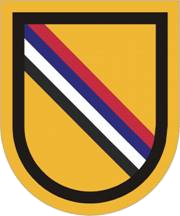
1st Special Forces Command, 39th Special Forces Detachment
—formerly 1st Special Forces, 1st Special Forces Group, Special Forces Detachment–Korea

Obsolete

Alaska Army National Guard, 38th Special Forces Company

Alabama Army National Guard, 20th Special Forces Group Recognition Bar

Special Forces personnel assigned to the Joint Chiefs of Staff

Supreme Headquarters Allied Powers Europe, North Atlantic Treaty Organization Special Forces Headquarters
—currently Allied Special Operations Forces Command

US Pacific Command, Joint Casualty Resolution Center–Special Forces Element

Utah Army National Guard, 19th Special Forces Group Recognition Bar

1st Special Forces, Special Forces Reserve

1st Special Forces, Special Forces Reserve Recognition Bar

1st Special Forces, 1st Special Forces Group Recognition Bar

1st Special Forces, 3rd Special Forces Group Recognition Bar

1st Special Forces, 5th Special Forces Group (original version)

1st Special Forces, 5th Special Forces Group Recognition Bar

1st Special Forces, 5th Special Forces Group–Vietnam Recognition Bar

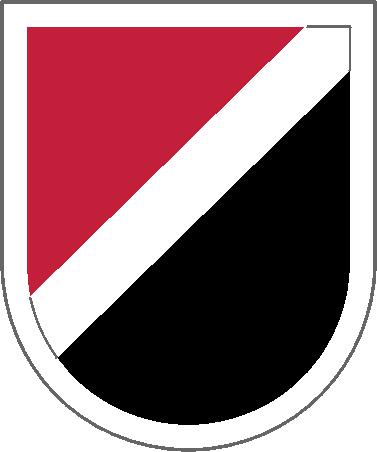
1st Special Forces, 6th Special Forces Group

1st Special Forces, 6th Special Forces Group Recognition Bar

1st Special Forces, 7th Special Forces Group Recognition Bar

1st Special Forces, 8th Special Forces Group

1st Special Forces, 8th Special Forces Group Recognition Bar

1st Special Forces, 10th Special Forces Group Recognition Bar

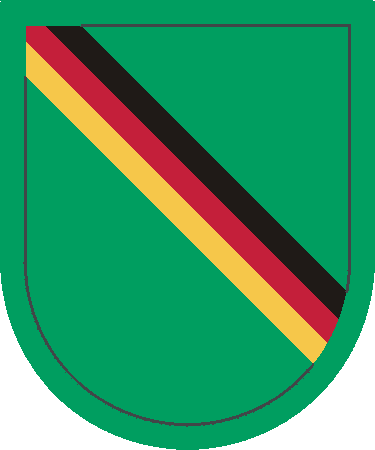
1st Special Forces, 10th Special Forces Group, Special Forces Detachment–Europe

1st Special Forces, 10th Special Forces Group, Special Forces Detachment–Europe Recognition Bar

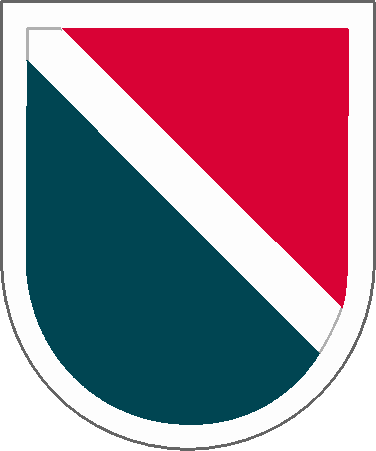
1st Special Forces, 11th Special Forces Group

1st Special Forces, 11th Special Forces Group Recognition Bar

1st Special Forces, 12th Special Forces Group

1st Special Forces, 12th Special Forces Group Recognition Bar

1st Special Forces, 46th Special Forces Company
—currently Joint US Military Advisory Group, Thailand–Special Forces Element

==== Sustainment ====
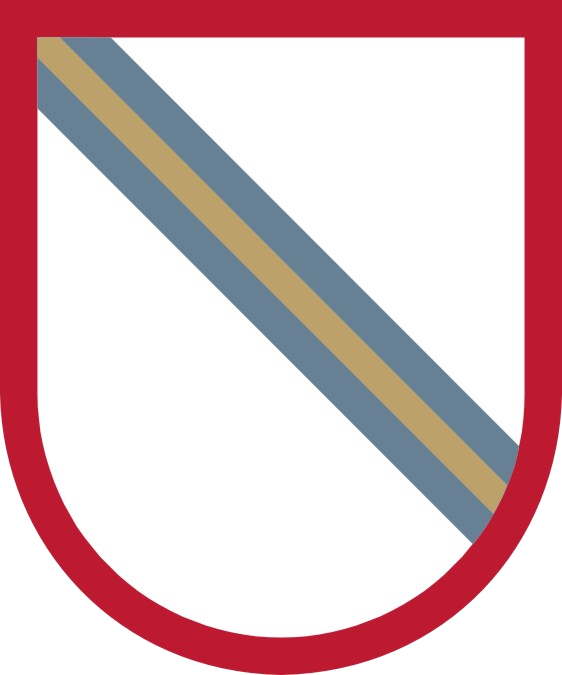
Defense Logistics Agency, Defense Distribution Depot–Army Element

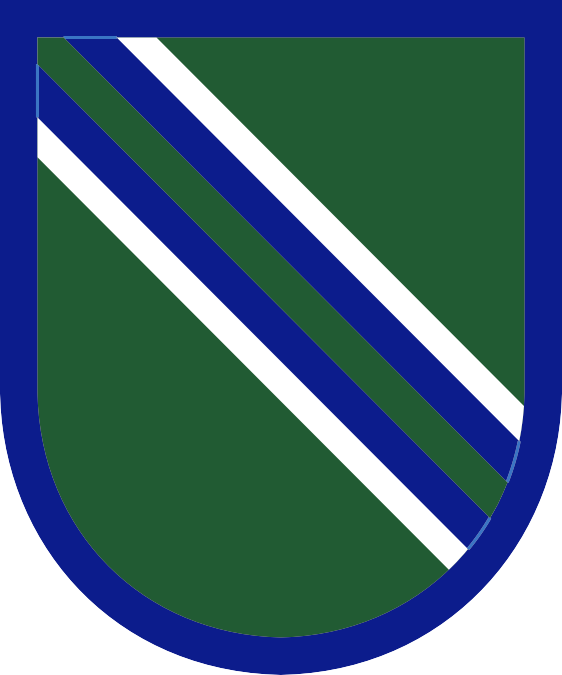
Georgia Army National Guard, 165th Quartermaster Company

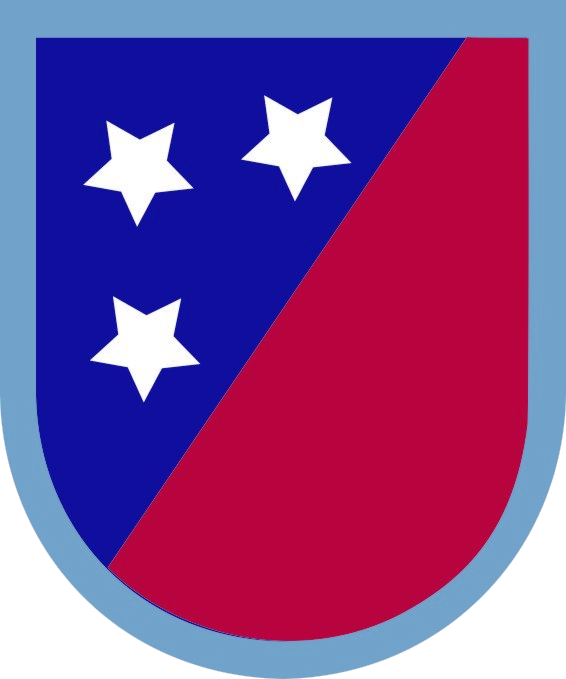
Program Executive Office, Airborne Procurement Team

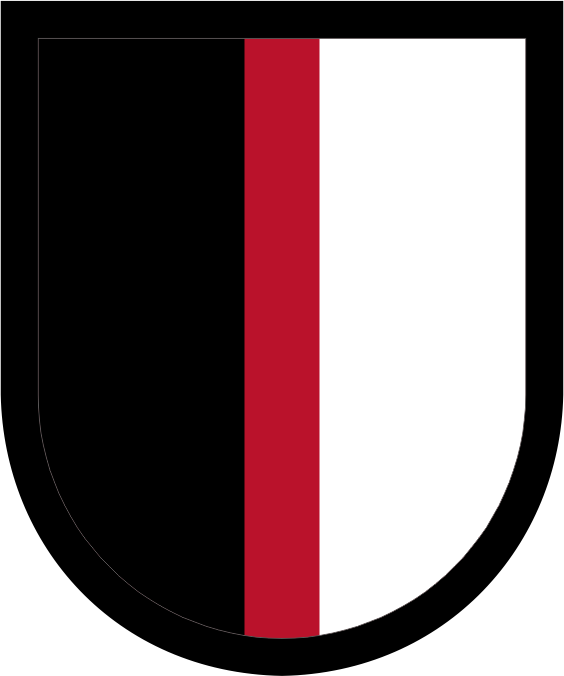
Rhode Island Army National Guard, 56th Quartermaster Rigger Support Team

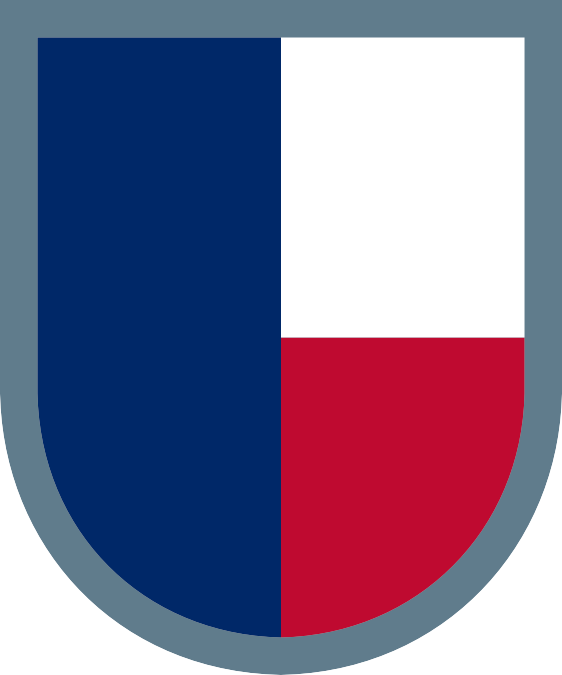
Texas Army National Guard, 528th Sustainment Brigade, Special Troops Battalion, 197th Special Troops Support Company

US Army Combat Capabilities Development Command, Soldier Center
—formerly US Army Futures Command

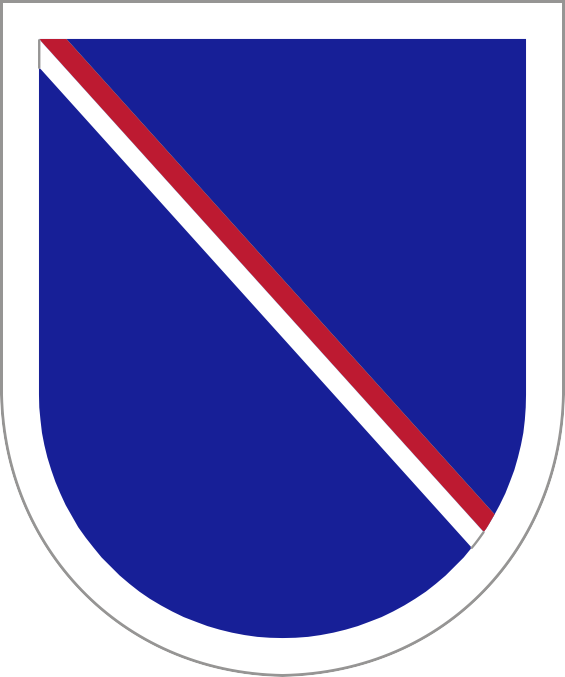
US Army Test and Evaluation Command, Yuma Proving Ground, Airborne Test Force

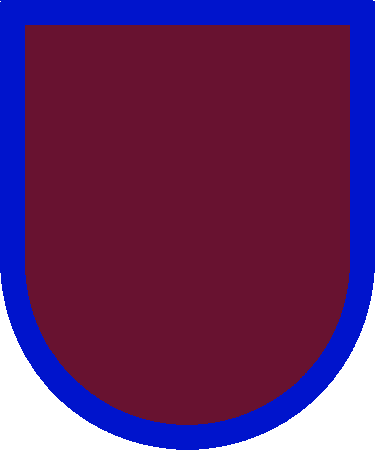
US Army Test and Evaluation Command, Airborne and Special Operations Test Directorate
—formerly US Army Airborne Board

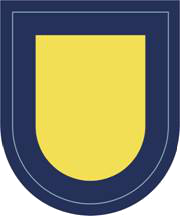
USAREUR–AF, 173rd Airborne Brigade, 173rd Brigade Support Battalion

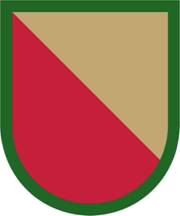
1st Special Forces Command, 528th Sustainment Brigade

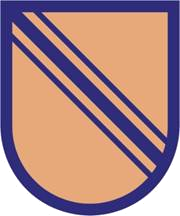
3rd Expeditionary Sustainment Command, 264th Combat Sustainment Support Battalion (CSSB), 647th Quartermaster Company

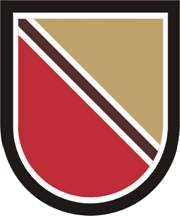
11th Airborne Division, 2nd Mobile Brigade Combat Team, 725th Brigade Support Battalion
—formerly 25th Infantry Division, 4th Brigade Combat Team, 725th Brigade Support Battalion

11th Airborne Division, 17th CSSB, 4th Quartermaster Company
—formerly Arctic Support Command, 17th CSSB, 4th Quartermaster Detachment

21st Theater Sustainment Command, 16th Sustainment Brigade, 16th Special Troops Battalion, 5th Quartermaster Theater Aerial Delivery Company

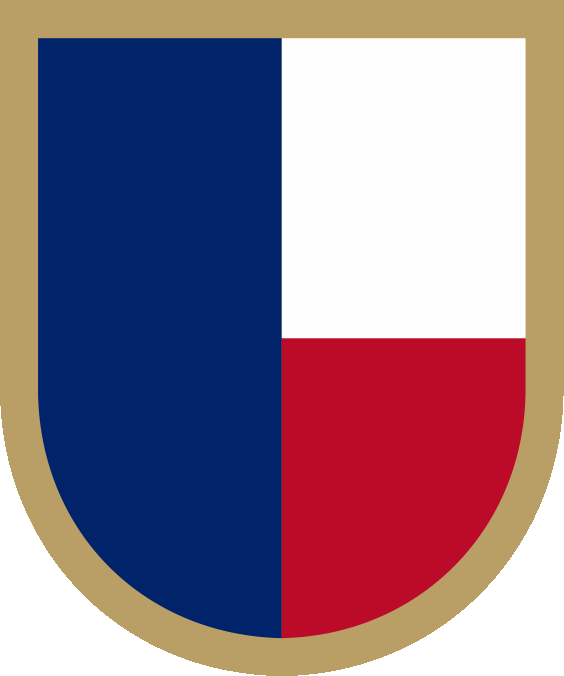
36th Infantry Division, 36th Sustainment Brigade, 372nd CSSB, 294th Quartermaster Company

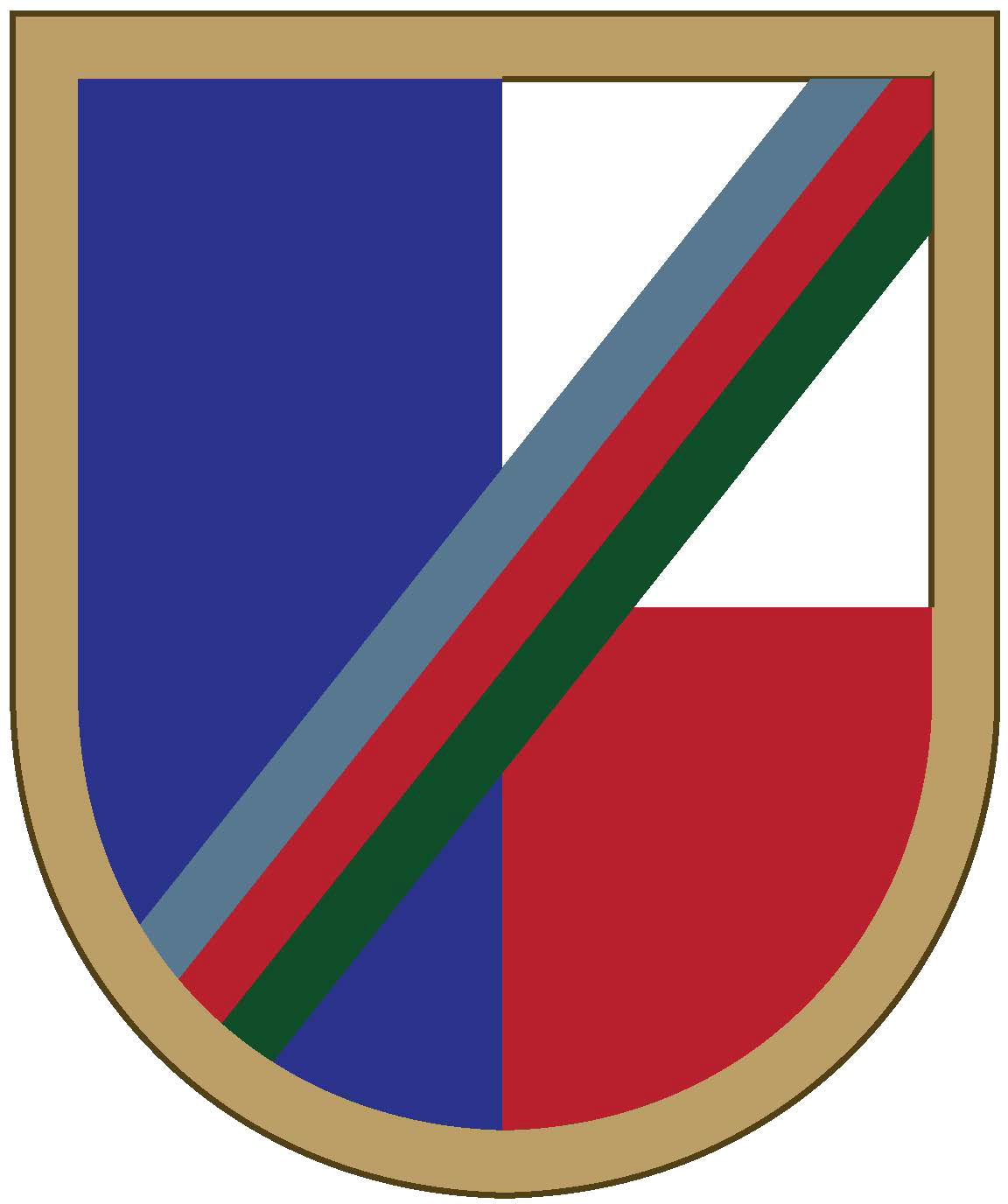
36th Infantry Division, 36th Sustainment Brigade, 372nd CSSB, 294th Quartermaster Company, 36th Quartermaster Detachment Echelon suspected

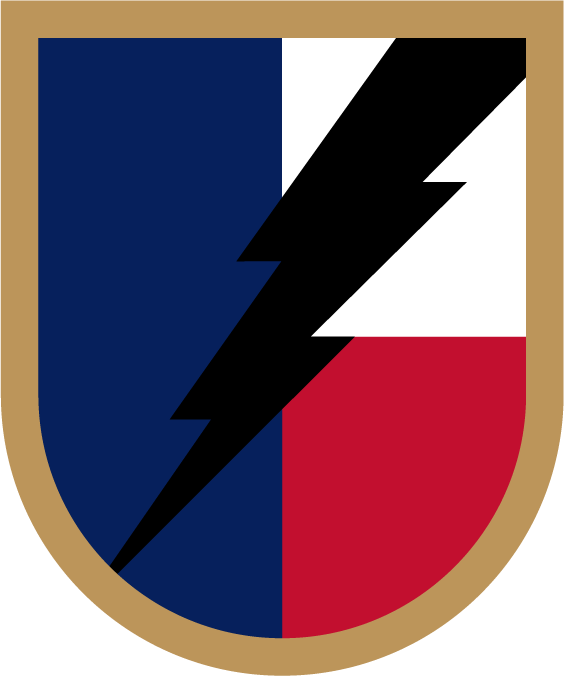
36th Infantry Division, 36th Sustainment Brigade, 372nd CSSB, 294th Quartermaster Company, 71st Quartermaster Detachment Echelon suspected

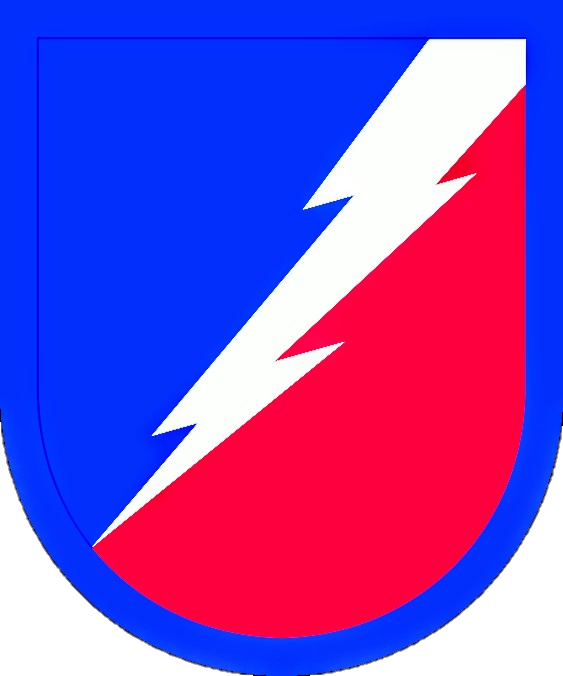
82nd Airborne Division, 82nd Airborne Division Sustainment Brigade

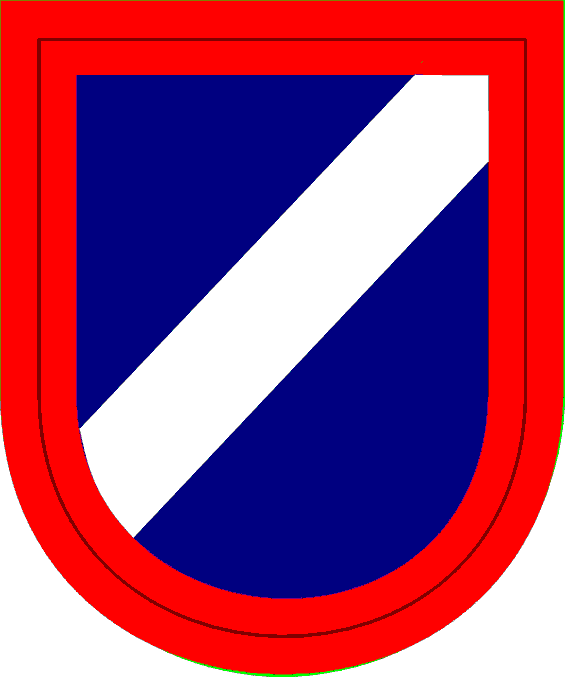
82nd Airborne Division, 82nd Airborne Division Sustainment Brigade, 82nd Light Support Battalion

82nd Airborne Division, 82nd Airborne Division Sustainment Brigade, 307th Light Support Battalion
—formerly 82nd Airborne Division, 307th Medical Battalion

82nd Airborne Division, 82nd Airborne Division Sustainment Brigade, 407th Light Support Battalion
—formerly 82nd Airborne Division, 407th Supply and Transportation Battalion

82nd Airborne Division, 82nd Combat Aviation Brigade, 122nd Aviation Support Battalion
—formerly 82nd Airborne Division, 82nd Aviation Brigade, 82nd Aviation Regiment, Company D (Aviation Maintenance)

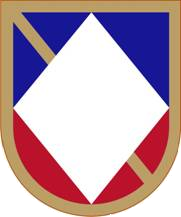
82nd Airborne Division, 82nd Airborne Division Sustainment Brigade, 189th CSSB, 11th Quartermaster Company

101st Airborne Division, 101st Division Sustainment Brigade
—formerly other Fort Campbell units who lacked an organizational beret flash in the 1970s

101st Airborne Division, 101st Division Sustainment Brigade, 426th Light Support Battalion

101st Airborne Division, 101st Division Sustainment Brigade, 526th Light Support Battalion

101st Airborne Division, 101st Division Sustainment Brigade, 626th Light Support Battalion

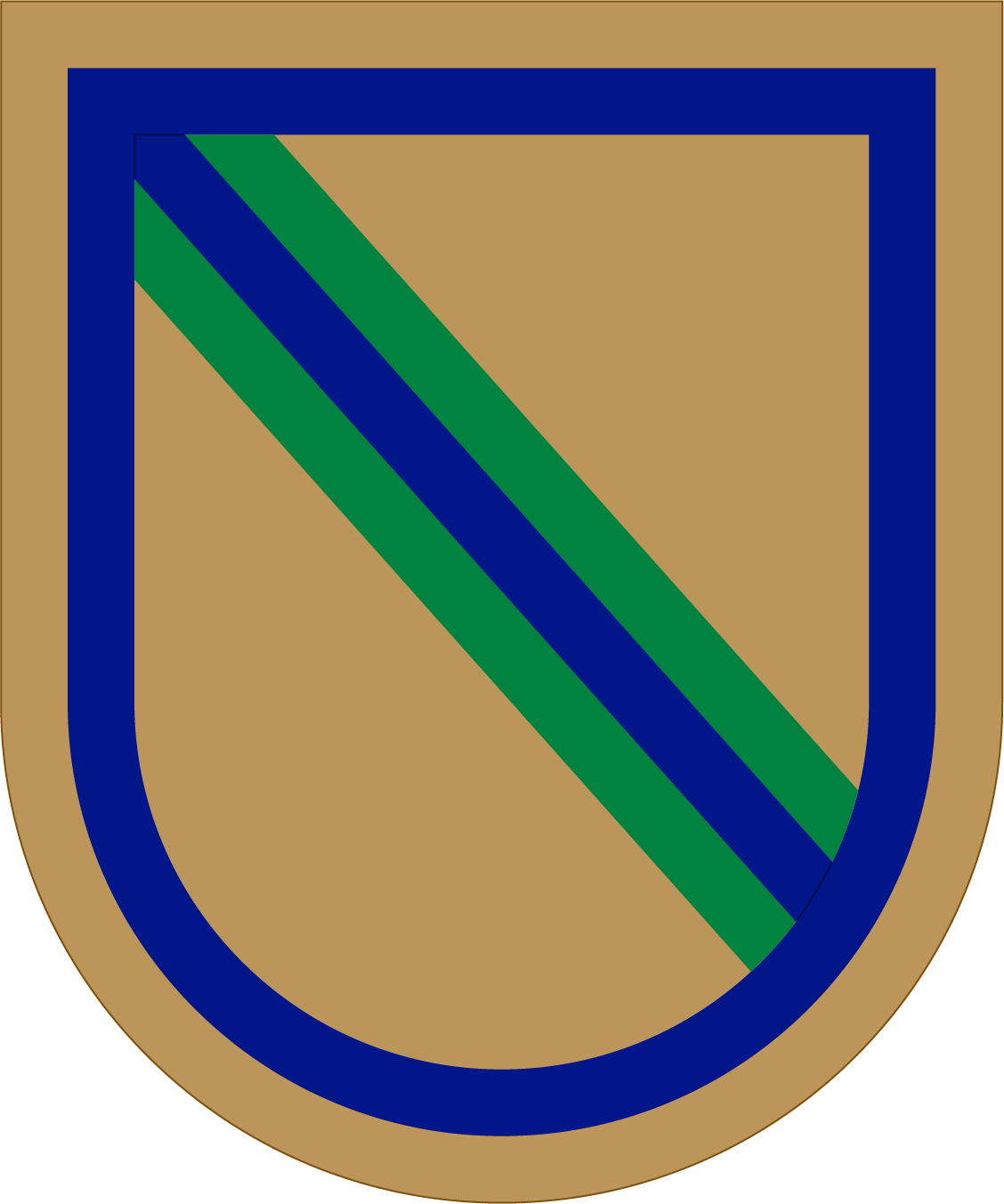
143rd Expeditionary Sustainment Command, 333rd Quartermaster Detachment

143rd Expeditionary Sustainment Command, 518th Sustainment Brigade, 275th CSSB, 824th Quartermaster Company

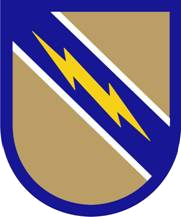
143rd Expeditionary Sustainment Command, 518th Sustainment Brigade, 275th CSSB, 861st Quartermaster Company

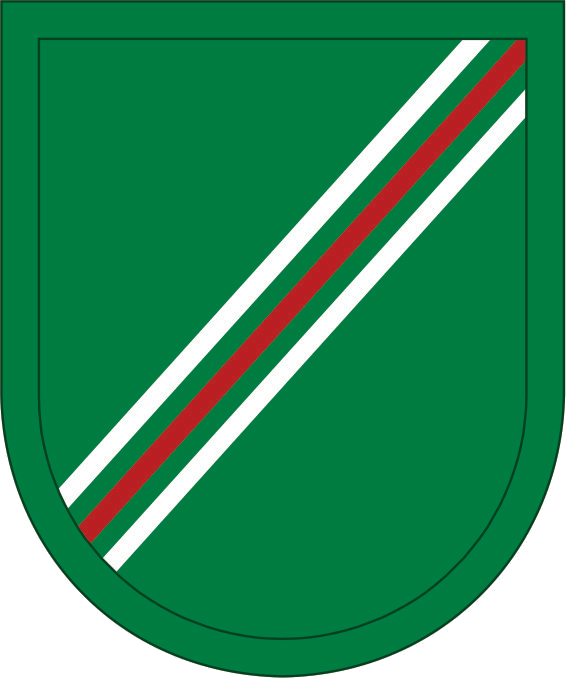
143rd Expeditionary Sustainment Command, 518th Sustainment Brigade, 352nd CSSB, 346th Quartermaster Company

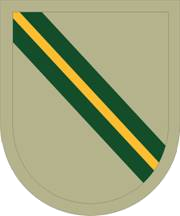
143rd Expeditionary Sustainment Command, 518th Sustainment Brigade, 352nd CSSB, 421st Quartermaster Company

Obsolete

US Army Europe, 29th Transportation Battalion

US Army Europe, 173rd Airborne Brigade, Combat Support Battalion

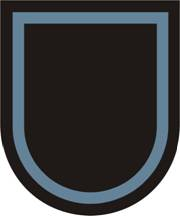
US Army Europe, 173rd Airborne Brigade, Special Troops Battalion

US Army Forces Command, 561st Maintenance Battalion

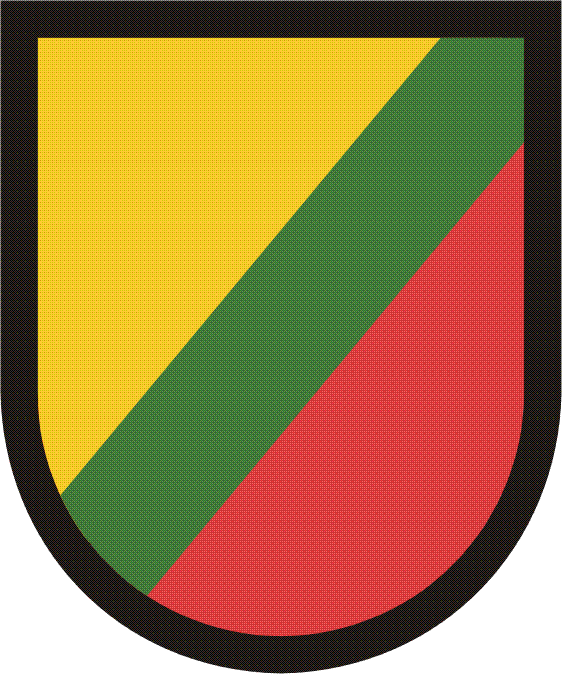
US Army Garrison, Fort Bragg

US Army Japan, 10th Regional Support Group, 35th CSSB, 87th Quartermaster Detachment

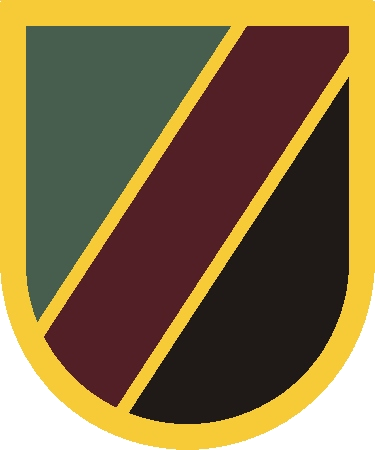
US Army Special Operations Support Command

1st Cavalry Division Support Command

1st Cavalry Division Support Command, 15th Support and Transport Battalion (original version)

1st Cavalry Division Support Command, 15th Support and Transport Battalion

1st Cavalry Division Support Command, 15th Support and Transport Battalion, Company A

1st Cavalry Division Support Command, 15th Support and Transport Battalion, Company B

1st Cavalry Division Support Command, 27th Maintenance Battalion

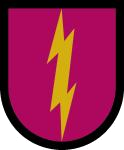
1st Cavalry Division, 1st Cavalry Division Sustainment Brigade, 527th Quartermaster Detachment

1st Corps Support Command, 600th Quartermaster Company

1st Corps Support Command, 612th Quartermaster Company

1st Corps Support Command, 623rd Quartermaster Company

–1st Special Operations Command, 13th Support Battalion
–1st Special Operations Command, 528th Support Battalion

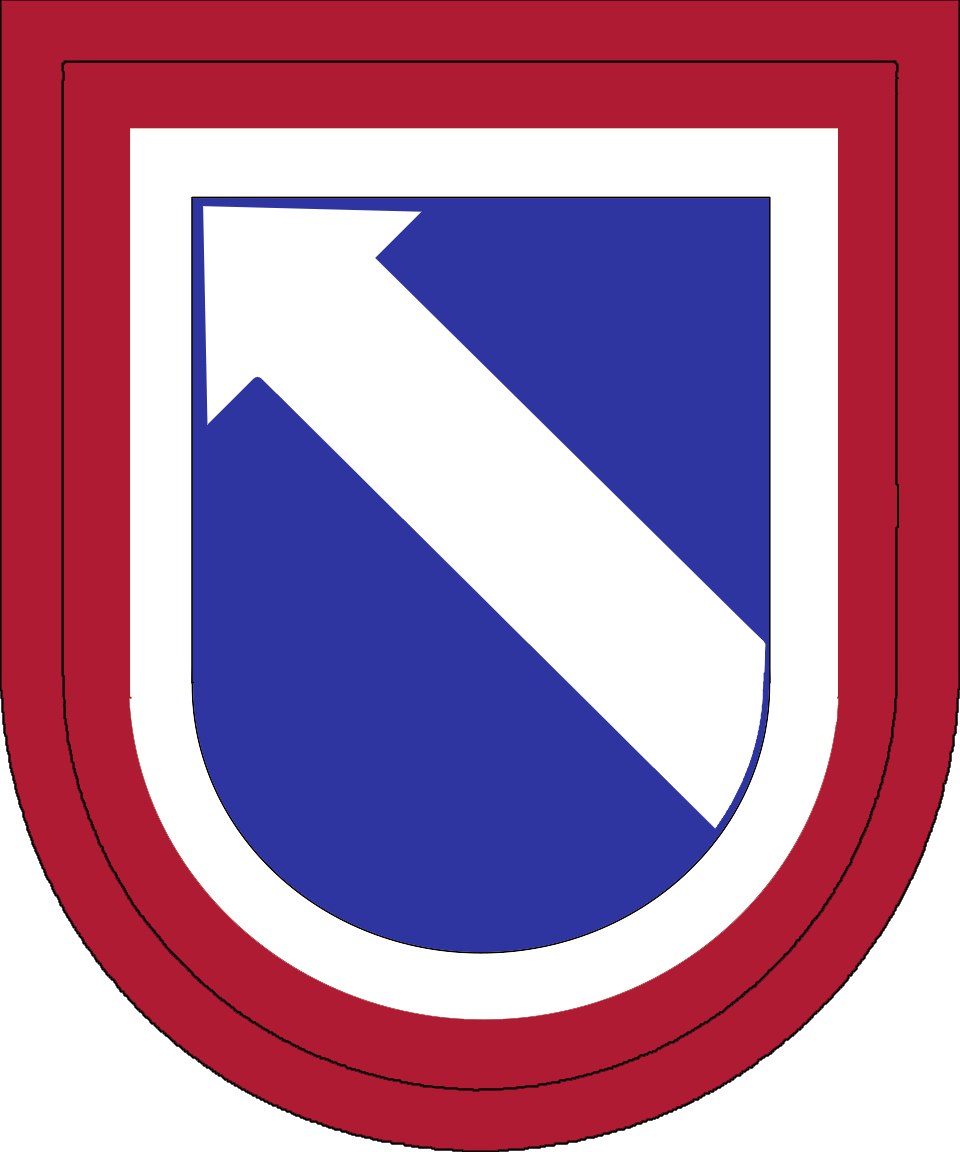
1st Sustainment Command

21st Theater Sustainment Command, 16th Sustainment Brigade, 16th Special Troops Battalion, 5th Quartermaster Theater Aerial Delivery Company (original version)

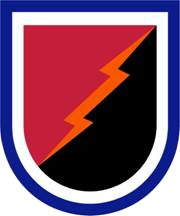
25th Infantry Division, 4th Brigade Combat Team, Special Troops Battalion

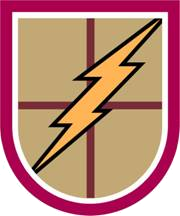
25th Infantry Division, 4th Brigade Combat Team, 167th Brigade Support Battalion

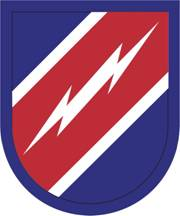
82nd Airborne Division, Special Troops Battalion

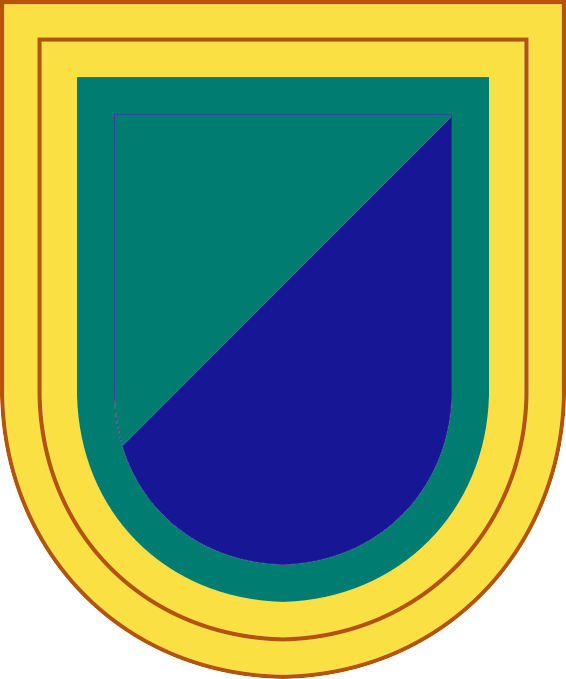
82nd Airborne Division, 1st Brigade Combat Team, Special Troops Battalion

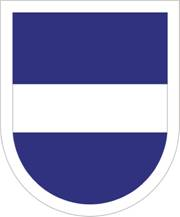
82nd Airborne Division, 2nd Brigade Combat Team, Special Troops Battalion

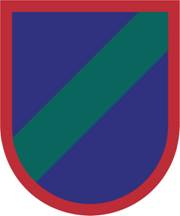
82nd Airborne Division, 3rd Brigade Combat Team, Special Troops Battalion

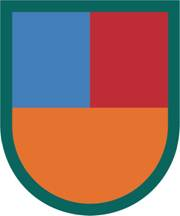
82nd Airborne Division, 4th Brigade Combat Team, Special Troops Battalion

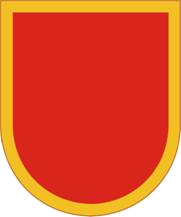
–82nd Airborne Division, 4th Brigade Combat Team, 782nd Maintenance Battalion
–82nd Airborne Division, 4th Brigade Combat Team, 782nd Brigade Support Battalion

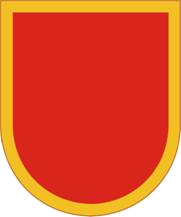
–82nd Airborne Division, 4th Brigade Combat Team, 782nd Brigade Support Battalion
–82nd Airborne Division, 782nd Maintenance Battalion

82nd Airborne Division, 82nd Aviation Brigade, 82nd Aviation Regiment, Company D (Aviation Maintenance)
—currently 82nd Airborne Division, 82nd Combat Aviation Brigade, 122nd Aviation Support Battalion

82nd Airborne Division, 82nd Aviation Brigade, 82nd Aviation Regiment, 33rd Aviation Maintenance Company

82nd Airborne Division, 407th Supply and Transportation Battalion
—currently 82nd Airborne Division, 2nd Brigade Combat Team, 407th Brigade Support Battalion

101st Airborne Division, 53rd Quartermaster Detachment

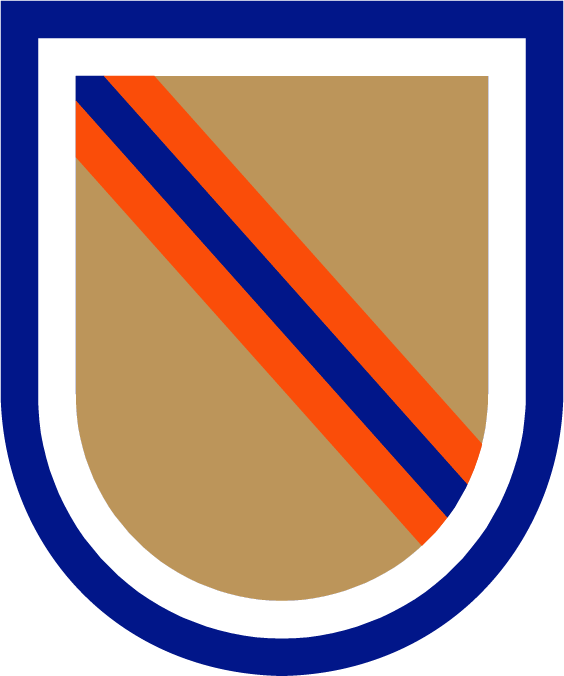
143rd Expeditionary Sustainment Command, 518th Sustainment Brigade, 275th CSSB, 470th Quartermaster Company

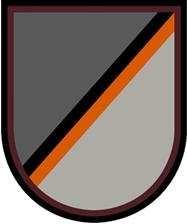
451st Expeditionary Sustainment Command, 89th Sustainment Brigade, 620th CSSB, 383rd Quartermaster Company

==== Training ====
National Guard Bureau, Army National Guard Warrior Training Center Brigade
—formerly
–1st Cavalry Division, 1st Brigade, 12th Cavalry Regiment, 1st Battalion
–VII Corps, 11th Aviation Group, Pathfinder Platoon (original version)

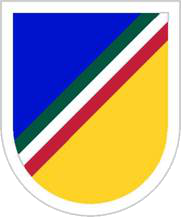
Joint Readiness Training Center and Operations Group

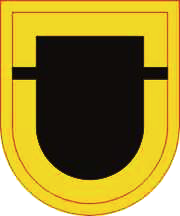
Joint Readiness Training Center, 509th Infantry Regiment, 1st Battalion

Security Force Assistance Command, 3rd SFAB

Security Force Assistance Command, 4th SFAB

Security Force Assistance Command, 5th SFAB

Security Force Assistance Command, 54th SFAB

US Army Infantry School, Airborne and Ranger Training Brigade

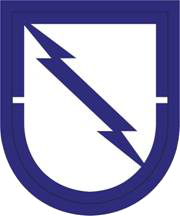
US Army Infantry School, Airborne and Ranger Training Brigade, 507th Infantry Regiment, 1st Battalion

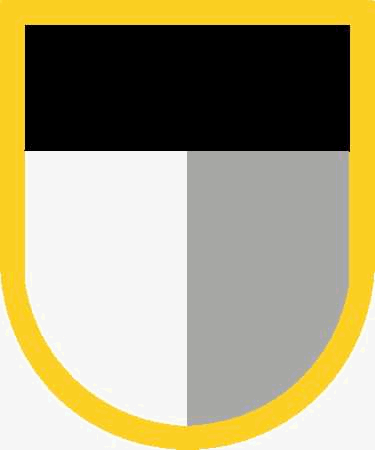
US Army John F. Kennedy Special Warfare Center and School (SWCS)

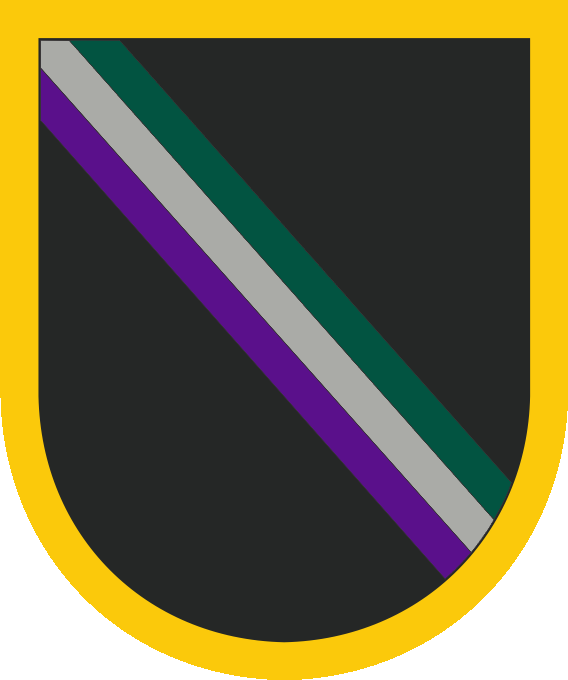
SWCS, David K Thuma NCO Academy

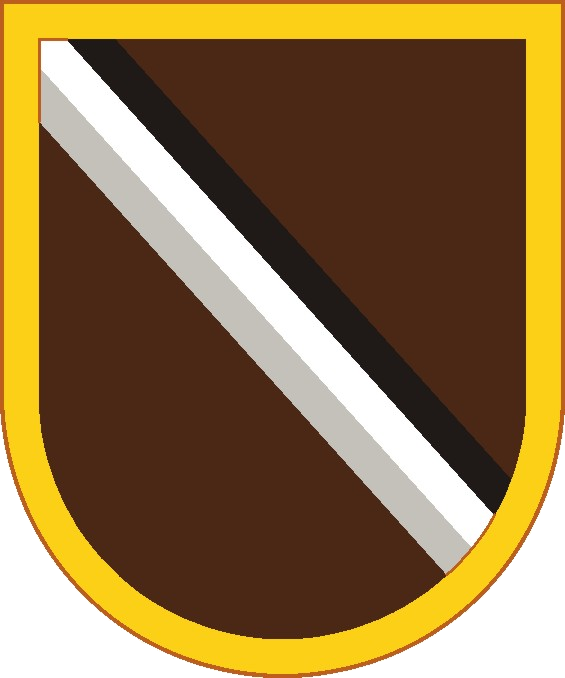
SWCS, Special Forces Warrant Officer Institute

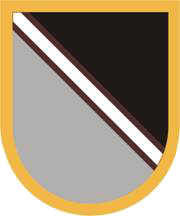
SWCS, Special Warfare Medical Group

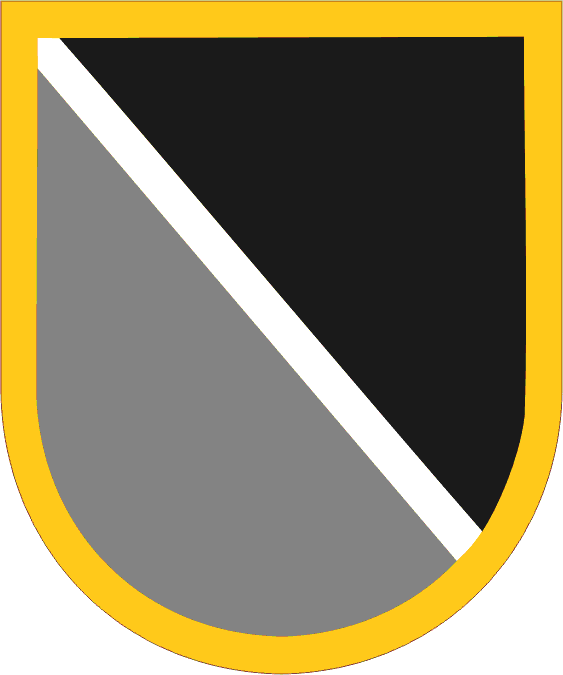
SWCS, 1st Special Warfare Training Group

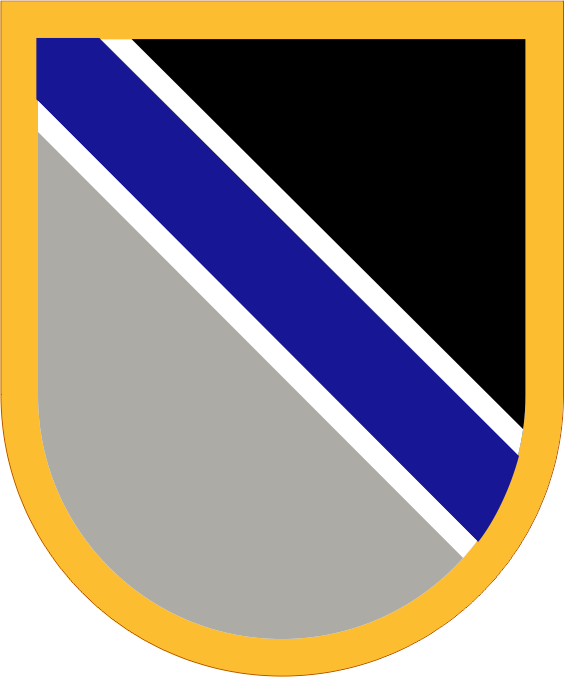
SWCS, 2nd Special Warfare Training Group

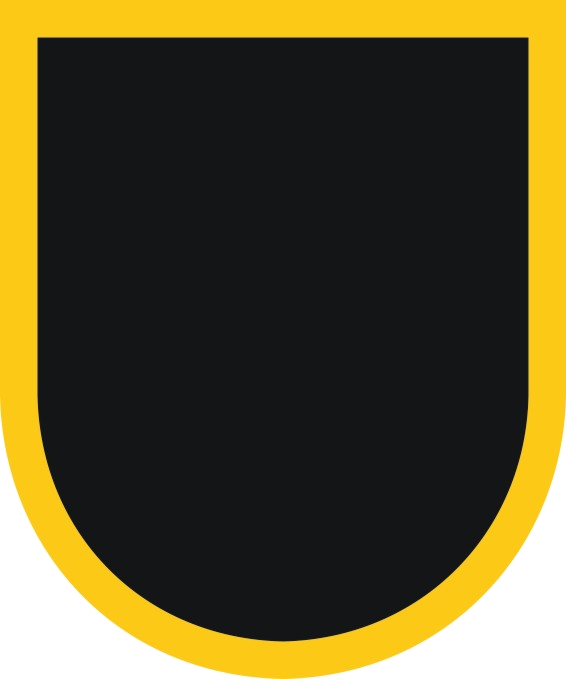
US Army Junior Reserve Officers' Training Corps
—formerly North Carolina State Defense Militia, Fayette Regiment

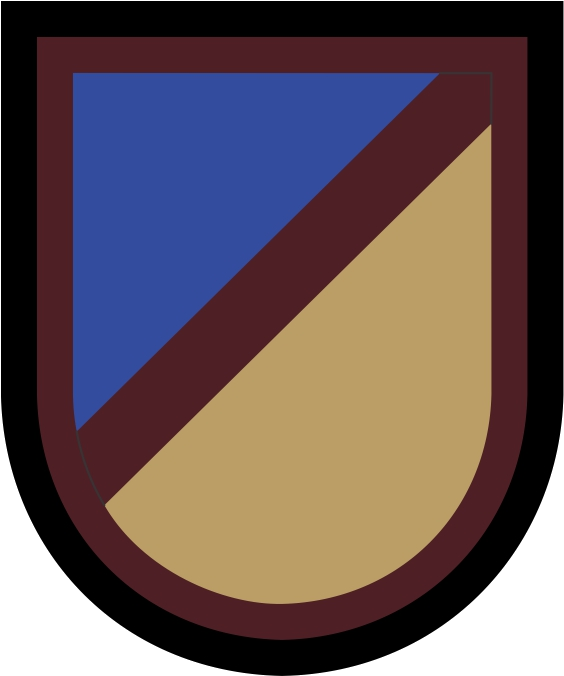
US Army Quartermaster Center and School, 23rd Quartermaster Brigade, 262nd Quartermaster Battalion

7th Army Training Command, Joint Multinational Readiness Center, 4th Infantry Regiment, 1st Battalion (Opposing Force)

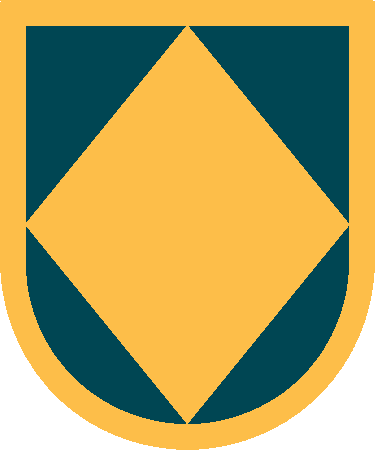
XVIII Airborne Corps, NCO Academy

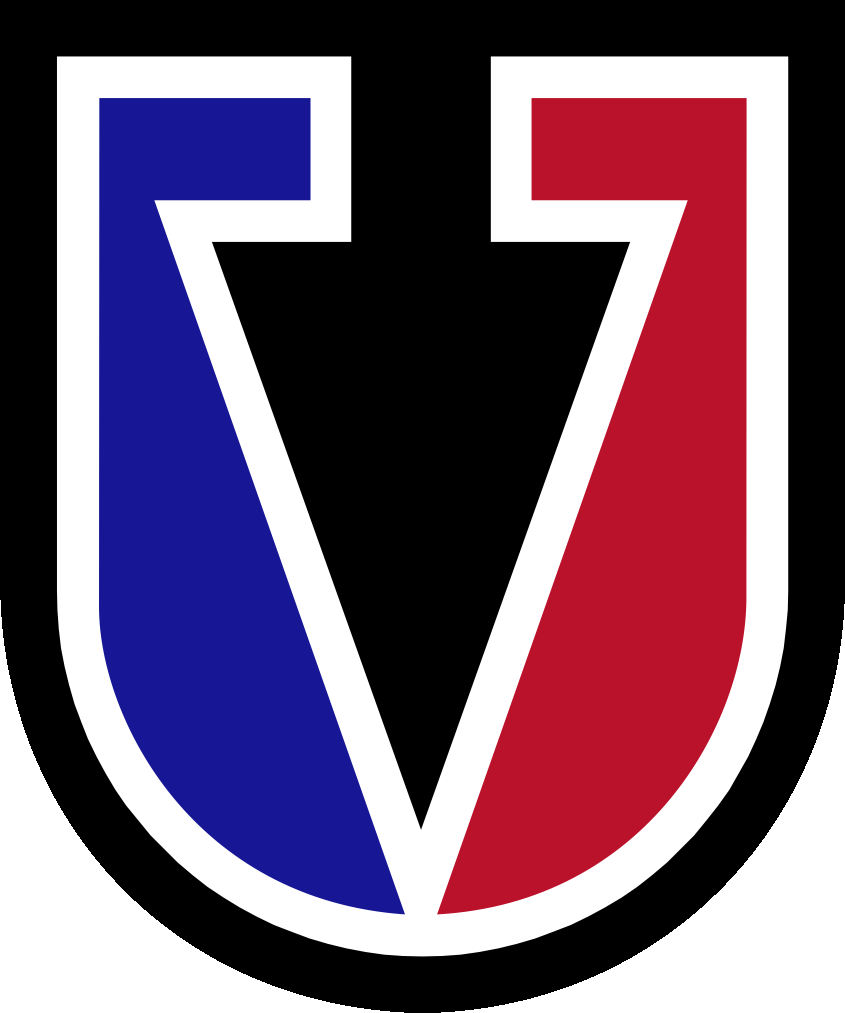
82nd Airborne Division, Advanced Airborne School

Obsolete

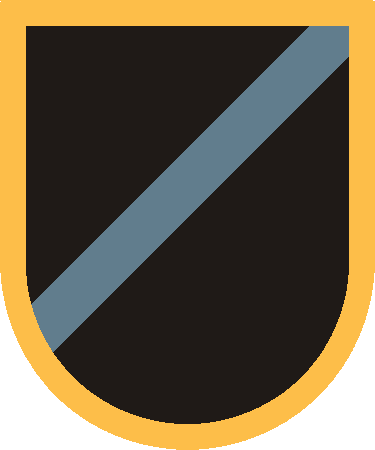
Fort Irwin National Training Center, Light Infantry and Task Force Observer/Controller Team

Joint Readiness Training Center and Operations Group (original version)

North Atlantic Treaty Organization International Long Range Reconnaissance Patrol School–US Army Element

Security Force Assistance Command

Security Force Assistance Command, 1st SFAB

Security Force Assistance Command, 2nd SFAB

–US Army Academy of Health Sciences, Academy Brigade, 3rd Battalion, Company F (Special Forces Medic School)
–Walter Reed Army Institute of Research, Field Epidemiologic Survey Team (Special Forces Element)

US Army Armor School, Armor Committee Group

US Army Armor School Instructor (made of plastic)

US Army Armor School Instructor Training Course (made of plastic)

US Army Armor School, 1st Armor Training Brigade

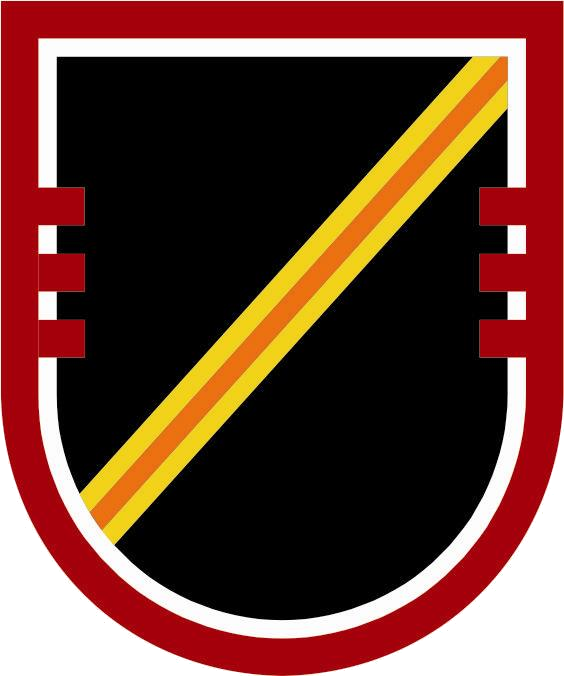
US Army Armor School, 16th Cavalry Regiment, 3rd Squadron, Company D (Reconnaissance and Surveillance Leaders Course)

US Army Armor School, 194th Armored Brigade, 3rd Field Artillery, 3rd Battalion (made of plastic)

–US Army Armor School, 194th Armored Brigade, 10th Cavalry Regiment, Troop D (Long-Range Surveillance)
–US Army Reserve Officers' Training Corps, Temple University
–Various other units (see "Armor and cavalry" section)

–US Army Armor School, 194th Armored Brigade, 33rd Armor Regiment, 5th Battalion
–US Army Armor School, 194th Armored Brigade, 37th Armor Regiment, 4th Battalion
(made of plastic)

US Army Armor School, 194th Armored Brigade, 54th Infantry Regiment, 4th Battalion (made of plastic)

US Army Aviation Center and School, 509th Infantry, Company C (Pathfinder)

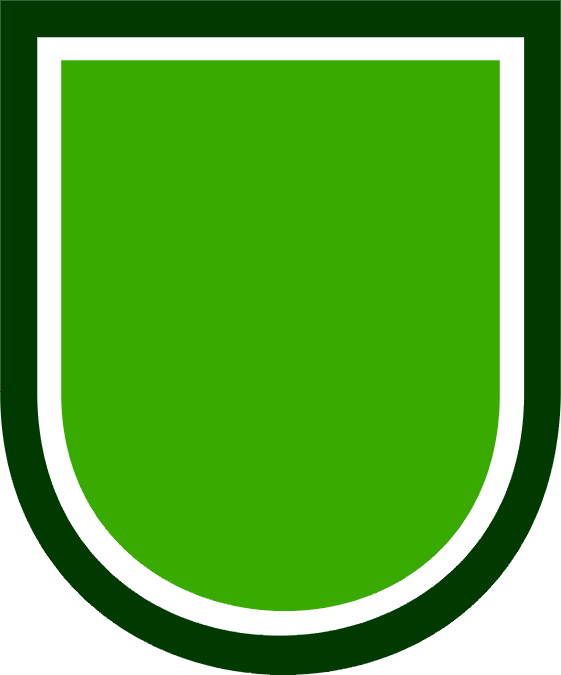
US Army Aviation Center and School, 511th Infantry, Company A (Pathfinder)
—currently 11th Airborne Division, 2nd Mobile Brigade Combat Team, 511th Infantry Regiment, 1st Battalion

US Army Infantry School, Airborne Department

US Army Infantry School, Ranger Department Recognition Bar

US Army Infantry School, 187th Infantry, Pathfinder Detachment

US Army Mountain Warfare School, 172nd Infantry Regiment, 3rd Battalion

US Army Quartermaster Center and School, Aerial Delivery & Field Services Department

SWCS, Special Forces Training Group

SWCS, Special Forces Training Group Recognition Bar

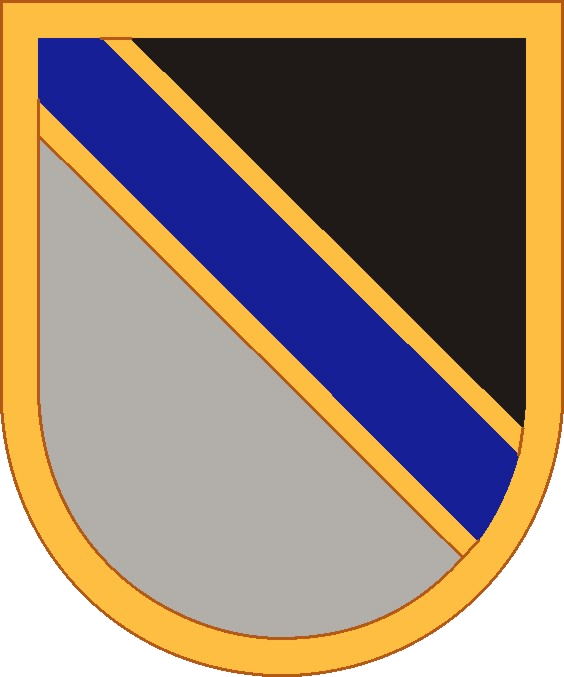
SWCS, Special Warfare Education Group

US Army Junior Reserve Officers' Training Corps

US Army Junior Reserve Officers' Training Corps, Oak Hills High School

US Army Junior Reserve Officers' Training Corps, Sussex Technical High School

US Army Reserve Officers' Training Corps, Drexel University

US Army Reserve Officers' Training Corps, Ranger Challenge Team

US Army Reserve Officers' Training Corps, Sam Houston State University, Counterguerrilla Company

US Army Reserve Officers' Training Corps, Senior Ranger Challenge Team

US Army Reserve Officers' Training Corps, Southwest Missouri State University

US Army Reserve Officers' Training Corps, University of North Carolina–Chapel Hill

US Army Reserve Officers' Training Corps, University of Puerto Rico–Mayagüez

US Army Reserve Officers' Training Corps, University of Utah, Ute Scouts Ranger Company

US Army Reserve Officers' Training Corps, University of Utah Recognition Bar

US Army Reserve Officers' Training Corps, Western Michigan University

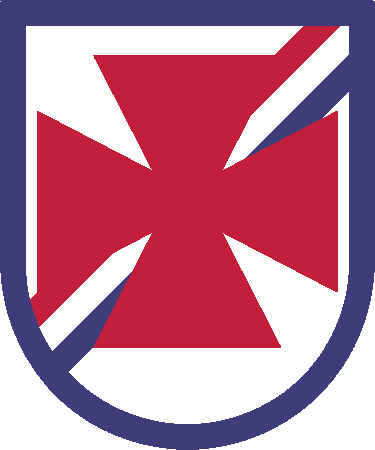
US Army School of the Americas, Special Operations and Civil Military Operations Department

US Army Training and Doctrine Command, Airborne/Airlift Action Office

US Military Academy, Airborne Detachment (original version)

US Military Academy, Airborne Detachment

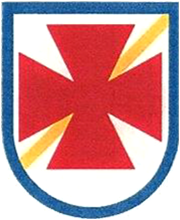
Western Hemisphere Institute for Security Cooperation, Training Battalion

–101st Airborne Division, Screaming Eagle Replacement Training School
–US Army Alaska, 172nd Infantry Brigade (original version)

=== Joint ===
Joint Enabling Capabilities Command, Joint Communications Support Element

Joint Enabling Capabilities Command, Joint Communications Support Element, 1st Squadron

Joint Enabling Capabilities Command, Joint Communications Support Element, 2nd Squadron

Joint Enabling Capabilities Command, Joint Communications Support Element, 4th Squadron

Joint Enabling Capabilities Command, Joint Communications Support Element, Communications Support Detachment

Obsolete

Joint Enabling Capabilities Command, Joint Communications Support Element, 3rd Squadron

=== State defense forces ===
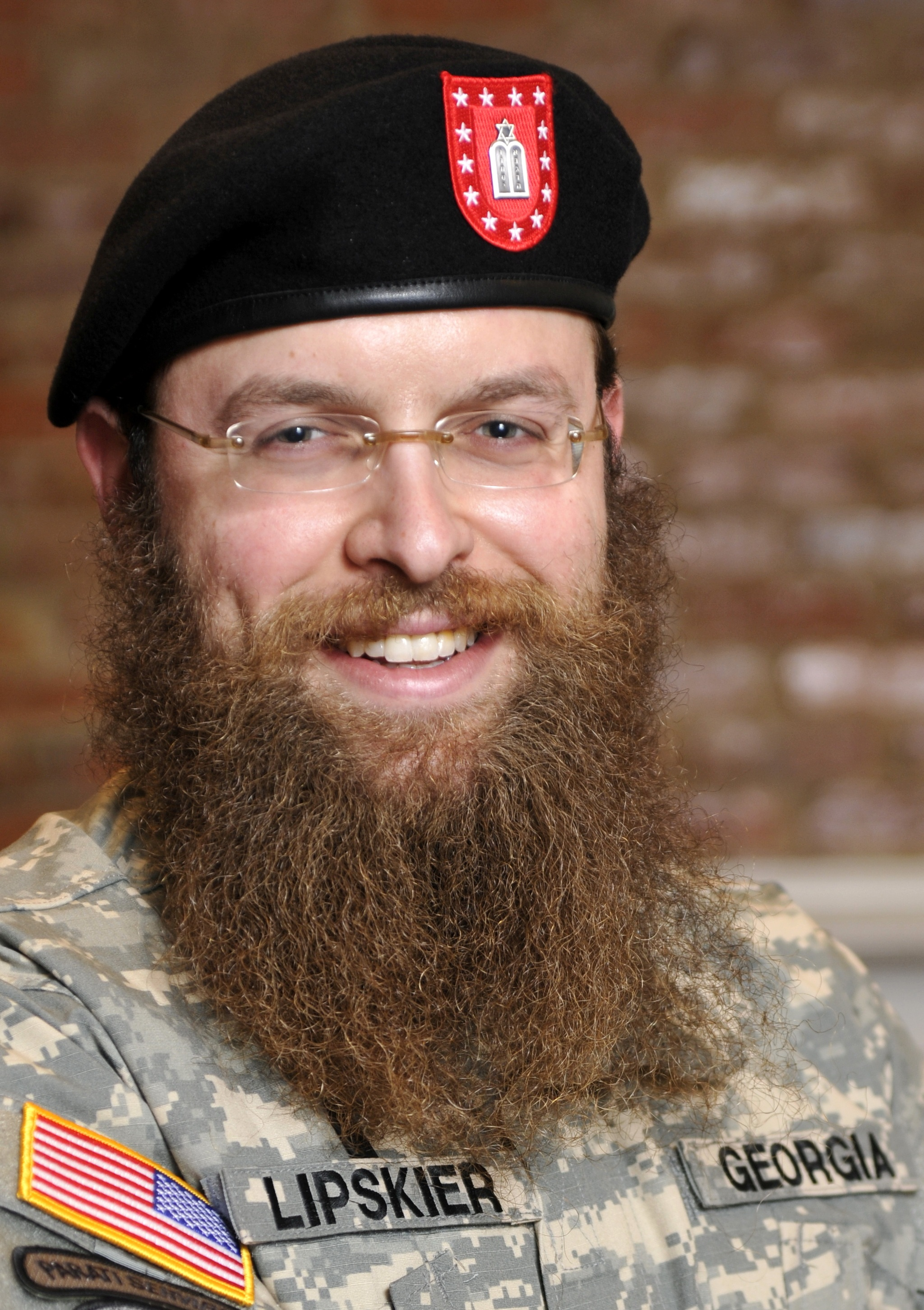
A Georgia State Defense Force chaplain wearing an Army combat uniform with State Defense Force Beret Flash and Chaplain (Judaism) Branch Insignia (2011)

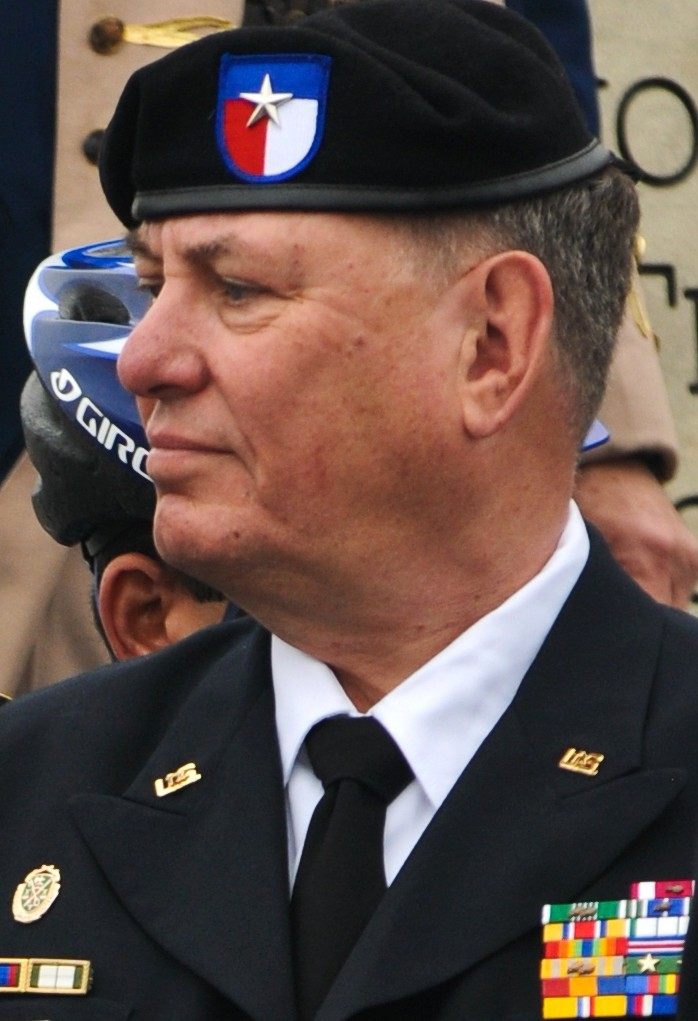
A Texas State Guard officer wearing an Army blue service uniform with Texas State Guard Beret Flash and brigadier general rank insignia affixed (2010)

Many US state defense forces—also known as state guard, state military reserve, or state militia—wear modified versions of US military uniforms. If a state or territory militia chooses to wear a military beret, a unique organizational beret flash is worn to help distinguish them from Army and Air Force formations, such as that state's or territory's Army National Guard. These state military reserve organizational beret flashes are worn in the same manner as today's Army and Air Force beret flashes. The following is a list of organizational beret flashes worn by various state and territory militias:

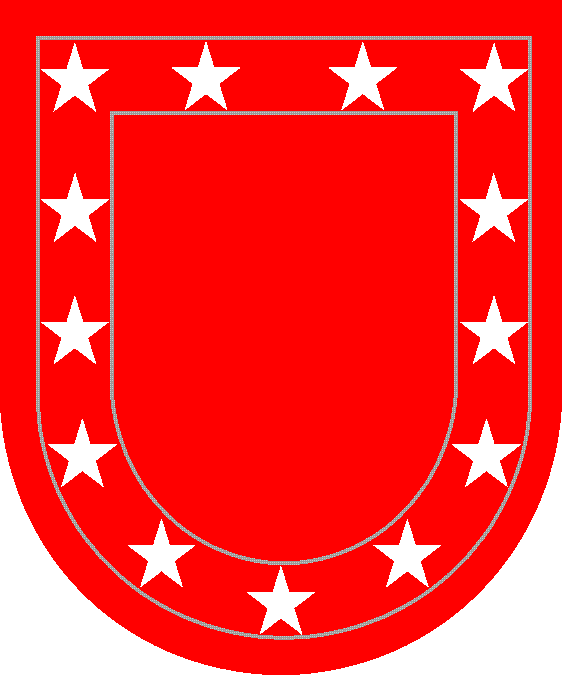
State Defense Force (worn by various state guard units)

==== State/Territory specific beret flashes ====
California State Guard

Maryland Defense Force

New York Guard

Puerto Rico State Guard
—formerly Puerto Rico National Guard Headquarters–Army Element

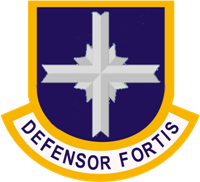
Puerto Rico State Guard, Air Division, 1st Air Base Group, Security Forces

Texas State Guard

Washington State Guard

Obsolete

Beret flashes in this section are difficult to verify.

District of Columbia Defense Force

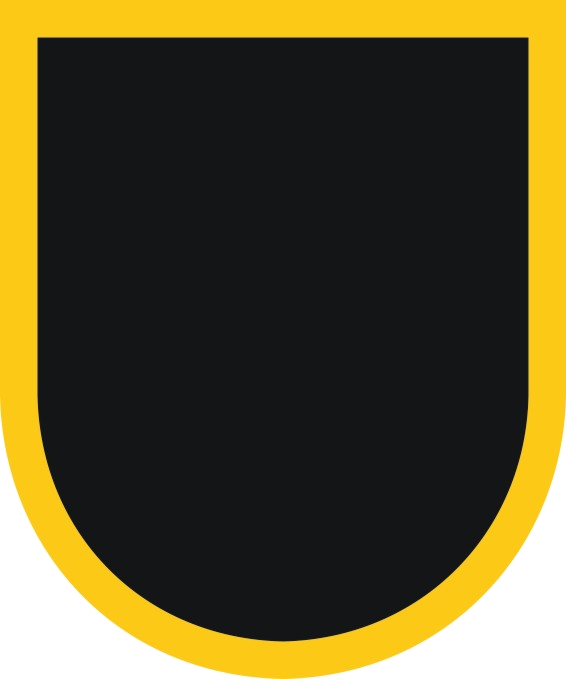
North Carolina State Defense Militia, Fayette Regiment
—currently US Army Junior Reserve Officers' Training Corps

North Carolina State Defense Militia, 12th Regiment

North Carolina State Defense Militia, 31st Regiment

North Carolina State Defense Militia, 38th Regiment

North Carolina State Defense Militia, 55th Regiment

North Carolina State Defense Militia, 70th Regiment

North Carolina State Defense Militia, 83rd Regiment

Ohio Military Reserve, 1st Brigade

Ohio Military Reserve, 2nd Brigade

Ohio Military Reserve, 4th Brigade

Ohio Military Reserve, 4th Brigade, 41st Battalion

Ohio Military Reserve, 4th Brigade, 42nd Battalion

Ohio Military Reserve, 4th Brigade, 43rd Battalion

Ohio Military Reserve, 5th Brigade

Texas State Guard, 404th Military Police Battalion

Washington State Guard, 1st Brigade

Washington State Guard, 2nd Brigade

== See also ==
- Red Patch
- Cap badge
- Tabs of the United States Army
- Uniforms of the United States Army
- Uniforms of the United States Air Force
- Badges of the United States Air Force
- Obsolete badges of the United States military#U.S. Air Force
- Uniforms of the United States Navy
