= Arthur Forrest =

Arthur Forrest may refer to:

- Arthur Forrest (speedway rider) (1932–2000), English speedway rider
- Arthur J. Forrest (1896–1964), American soldier and Medal of Honor recipient
- Arthur Forrest (Royal Navy officer) (died 1770), British naval officer
- Arthur Forrest (rugby union)
