= 451st =

451st may refer to:

- 451st Air Expeditionary Wing, a provisional United States Air Force Air Combat Command unit, currently in Afghanistan
- 451st Expeditionary Sustainment Command (ESC) is a subordinate command of 79th Sustainment Support Command
- 451st Flying Training Squadron, active United States Air Force unit
- 451st Intelligence Squadron, intelligence unit located at RAF Menwith Hill, United Kingdom

== See also ==
- 451 (number)
- 451, the year 451 (CDLI) of the Julian calendar
- 451 BC
