= 89th Infantry Division (United States) =

89th Infantry Division 89th Division
- 89th Infantry Division shoulder sleeve insignia
- Active: 5 August 1917–12 June 1919 (National Army); 24 June 1921–17 December 1945 (Organized Reserves); 24 January 1947–1 March 1975 (Army Reserve)
- Country: United States
- Branch: United States Army
- Type: Infantry
- Size: Division
- Nickname: "The Rolling W"
- Engagements: World War I; St. Mihiel; Meuse-Argonne; Lorraine 1918; World War II; Rhineland; Central Europe

Commanders
- Notable commanders: Leonard Wood; William M. Wright

Insignia
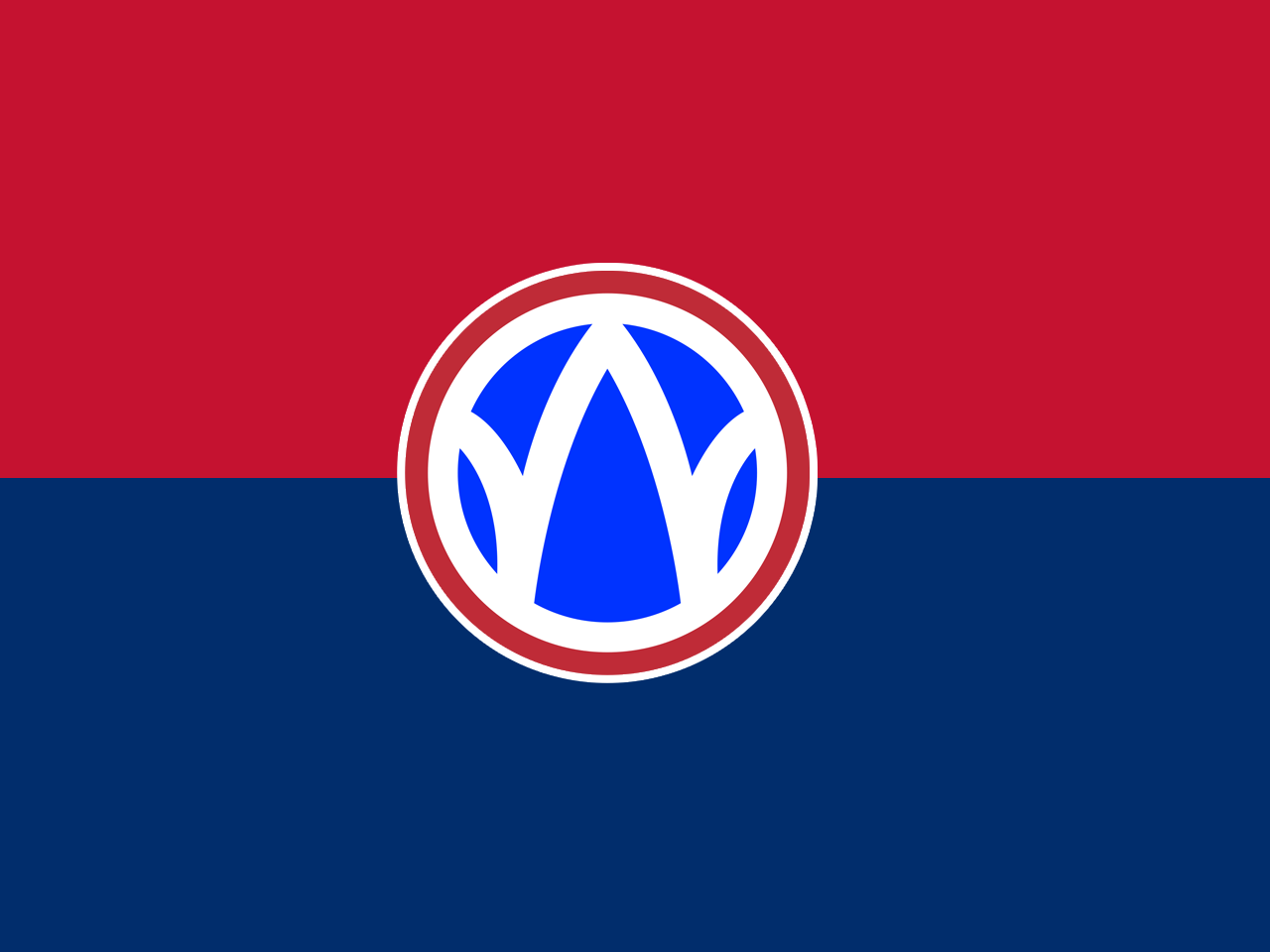
- Flag of the United States Army 89th Infantry Division

The 89th Infantry Division, originally known as the "89th Division," was an infantry formation of the United States Army that was active during World War I, World War II, and the Cold War.

== History ==
=== World War I ===
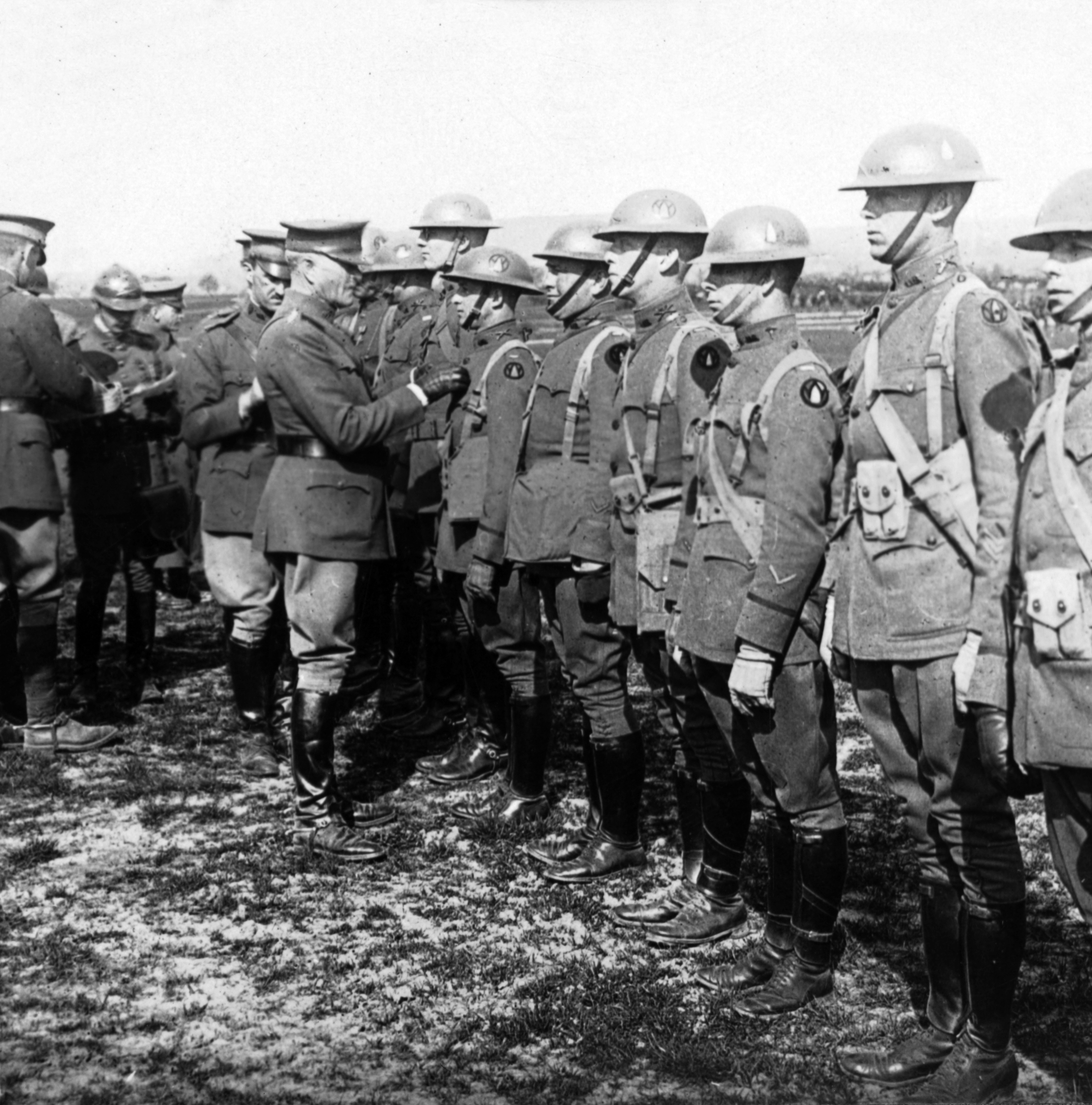
Officers of the 89th Division being decorated by General John J. Pershing in Trier, Germany, April 1919.

The 89th Division was officially established by the War Department on 5 August 1917, four months after the American entry into World War I, at Camp Funston, Fort Riley, Kansas. On 27 August, Major General Leonard Wood, formerly the Chief of Staff of the United States Army, assumed command. Organization of the division began during the last week of August, with a cadre of officers and men of the Regular Army, and from officers of the Officers' Reserve Corps and National Army officer graduates of the First Officers Training Camp held at Fort Riley. From September 5–10, the initial draft of 2,200 Selective Service men arrived, and from Sept 19-24, an additional 18,600 arrived. The drafted men came from Arizona, Colorado, Kansas, Missouri, Nebraska, New Mexico, and South Dakota.

The 353rd Infantry was organized with men from Kansas, the 354th Infantry with men from southeastern and eastern Missouri, the 355th Infantry with men from Nebraska, and the 356th Infantry with men from northwest Missouri. The 340th Machine Gun Battalion was organized with men from South Dakota, the 341st Machine Gun Battalion principally from men living in the Omaha, Nebraska, area, and the 342nd Machine Gun Battalion got men from Arizona, Colorado, and South Dakota. The 340th Field Artillery was sent men from Arizona, the 341st Field Artillery from Colorado, and the 342nd Field Artillery from southeast Missouri. The 314th Engineer Regiment received men from southeastern and eastern Missouri that were surplus after the organization of the 354th Infantry. The 314th Field Signal Battalion was organized using men of the Signal Enlisted Reserve Corps called to active duty. They were principally from the Chicago area, but the unit also "contained representatives of almost every state;" Company A, the radio company, was made up principally of reservists who worked for the Western Electric Company. Men from Nebraska comprised the 314th Ammunition Train, while the 314th Engineer, Sanitary, and Supply Trains received men from each state sent to Camp Funston.

Systematic training began. Between January and June 1918, arrivals and departures at Camp Funston aggregated 20,000 each, and on April 30, the 89th Division numbered 16,000 men, having been reduced by transfers to the 3rd, 4th, 35th, and other divisions. In May, fresh drafts and transfers completed the division.

The division, now commanded by Major General William M. Wright, was sent overseas in June and July 1918 to join the American Expeditionary Force (AEF) in the final stages of World War I, which ended on November 11, 1918, due to the Armistice with Germany. The 89th Division, now under Major General Frank L. Winn, participated in the Battle of St. Mihiel and the Meuse-Argonne Offensive. Two 89th staff officers would serve together in significant roles in WWII: Division Chief of Staff Col. John C.H. Lee, and his G-4 (supply officer), Lt. Col. Brehon B. Somervell, who also received the Distinguished Service Cross for leading a three-man patrol to inspect damage to a bridge some 600 yards (550 m) in front of American lines. Lee would serve under Somervell in the Army Service Forces from 1942 to 1945.

==== Order of battle ====
- Headquarters, 89th Division
- 177th Infantry Brigade
  - 353rd Infantry Regiment
  - 354th Infantry Regiment
  - 341st Machine Gun Battalion
- 178th Infantry Brigade
  - 355th Infantry Regiment
  - 356th Infantry Regiment
  - 342nd Machine Gun Battalion
- 164th Field Artillery Brigade
  - 340th Field Artillery Regiment (75 mm)
  - 341st Field Artillery Regiment (75 mm)
  - 342nd Field Artillery Regiment (155 mm)
  - 314th Trench Mortar Battery
- 340th Machine Gun Battalion
- 314th Engineer Regiment
- 314th Field Signal Battalion
- Headquarters Troop, 89th Division
- 314th Train Headquarters and Military Police
  - 314th Ammunition Train
  - 314th Supply Train
  - 314th Engineer Train
  - 314th Sanitary Train
    - 353rd-356th Ambulance Companies and Field Hospitals

=== Interwar period ===
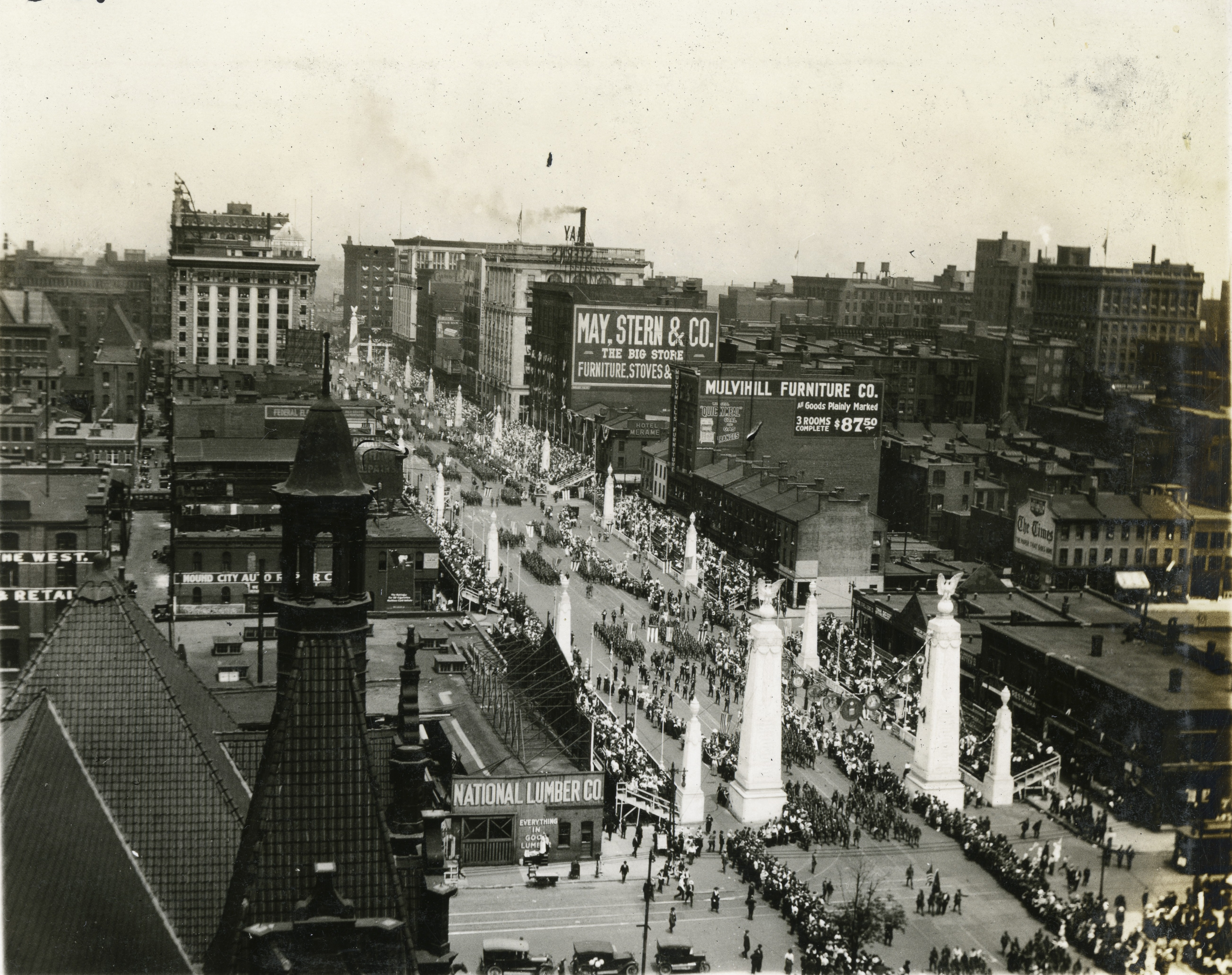
89th Division passing through the Court of Honor in St. Louis, Missouri, in May 1919

The division was reconstituted in the Organized Reserve on 24 June 1921, allotted to the Seventh Corps Area, and assigned to the XVII Corps. The division was further allotted to the states of Nebraska, Kansas, and South Dakota. The headquarters was organized on 2 September 1921 at the Army Building at 15th and Dodge Streets in Omaha, Nebraska. It moved in April 1922 to 22nd and Hickory Streets, and to the new Federal Office Building at 106 South 15th Street on 18 January 1934, where it remained until the division was ordered into active military service for World War II. The designated mobilization station for the division during this period was Fort Riley, Kansas. After its reorganization, the division formed rapidly and by November 1922, the “Middle West Division” was up to 95 percent strength in its complement of officers as required by its peacetime tables of organization.

The headquarters and staff usually trained with the staff of the 14th Infantry Brigade, 7th Division, either at Fort Crook, Nebraska, or at Fort Snelling, Minnesota. The infantry regiments of the division held their summer training primarily with the 17th Infantry Regiment at Fort Crook, or Fort Leavenworth, Kansas. Other units, such as the special troops, artillery, engineers, aviation, medical, and quartermaster, trained at various posts in the Sixth and Seventh Corps Areas, often with the active units of the 7th Division. For example, the division's artillery trained at various posts to include Fort Riley, Fort Des Moines, Iowa, and Camp McCoy, Wisconsin, with the 9th and 14th Field Artillery Regiments; the 314th Engineer Regiment trained at Fort Riley, with Troop A, 9th Engineer Squadron; the 314th Medical Regiment trained at the Medical Corps training camp at Fort Snelling; and the 314th Observation Squadron trained with the 16th Observation Squadron at Marshall Army Airfield, Kansas. In addition to the unit training camps, the infantry regiments of the division rotated responsibility to conduct the Citizens Military Training Camps held at Fort Crook, Fort Des Moines, and Fort Leavenworth each year. On a number of occasions, the division participated in Seventh Corps Area and Fourth Army command post exercises in conjunction with other Regular Army, National Guard, and Organized Reserve units. Unlike the Regular and Guard units, however, the 89th Division did not participate in the various Seventh Corps Area maneuvers and the Fourth Army maneuvers of 1937, 1940, and 1941 as an organized unit due to lack of enlisted personnel and equipment. Instead, the officers and a few enlisted reservists were assigned to Regular and Guard units to fill vacant slots and bring the units up to war strength for the exercises. Additionally, some officers were assigned duties as umpires or as support personnel.

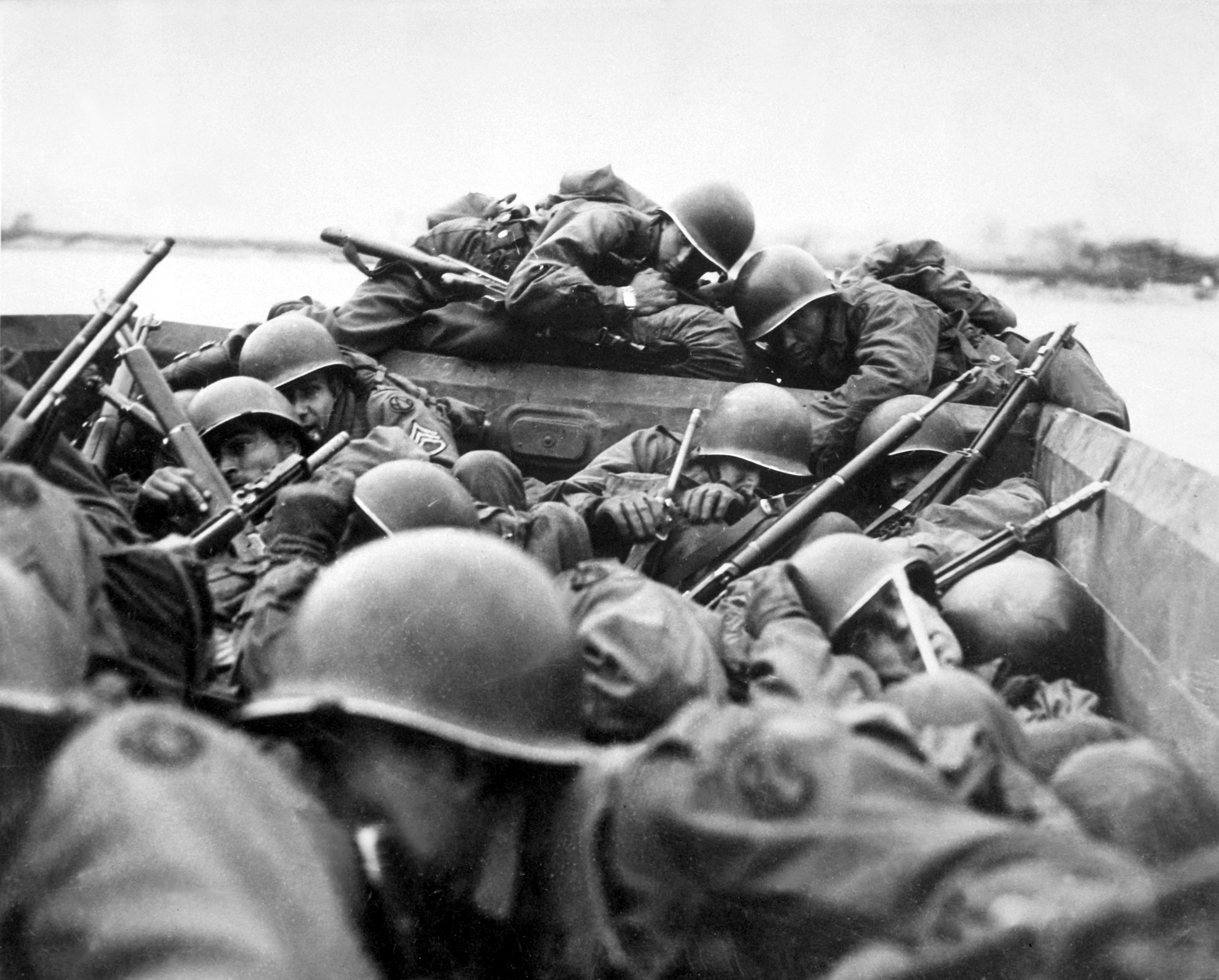
Men of the 89th Infantry Division cross the Rhine River in assault boats, March 1945.

==== Organization 1939 ====
- Headquarters (Omaha, NE)
- Headquarters, Special Troops (Omaha, NE)
  - Headquarters Company (Omaha, NE)
  - 89th Military Police Company (Alliance, NE)
  - 89th Signal Company (Omaha, NE)
  - 314th Ordnance Company (Medium) (Beatrice, NE)
  - 89th Tank Company (Light) (Scottsbluff, NE)
- 177th Infantry Brigade (Wichita, KS)
  - 353rd Infantry Regiment (Wichita, KS)
  - 354th Infantry Regiment (Kansas City, KS)
- 178th Infantry Brigade (Norfolk, NE)
  - 355th Infantry Regiment (Omaha, NE)
  - 356th Infantry Regiment (Sioux Falls, SD)
- 164th Field Artillery Brigade (Topeka, KS)
  - 340th Field Artillery Regiment (75 mm) (Wichita, KS)
  - 341st Field Artillery Regiment (75 mm) (Omaha, NE)
  - 342nd Field Artillery Regiment (155 mm) (Lincoln, NE)
  - 314th Ammunition Train (O'Neill, NE)
- 314th Engineer Regiment (Grand Island, NE)
- 314th Medical Regiment (Omaha, NE)
- 414th Quartermaster Regiment (Mitchell, SD)

=== World War II ===
==== Mobilization ====
Before Organized Reserve infantry divisions were ordered into active military service, they were reorganized on paper as "triangular" divisions under the 1940 tables of organization. The headquarters companies of the two infantry brigades were consolidated into the division's cavalry reconnaissance troop, and one infantry regiment was removed by inactivation. The field artillery brigade headquarters and headquarters battery became the headquarters and headquarters battery of the division artillery. Its three field artillery regiments were reorganized into four battalions; one battalion was taken from each of the two 75 mm gun regiments to form two 105 mm howitzer battalions, the brigade's ammunition train was reorganized as the third 105 mm howitzer battalion, and the 155 mm howitzer battalion was formed from the 155 mm howitzer regiment. The engineer, medical, and quartermaster regiments were reorganized into battalions. In 1942, divisional quartermaster battalions were split into ordnance light maintenance companies and quartermaster companies, and the division's headquarters and military police company, which had previously been a combined unit, was split.

==== Division organization ====
The division consisted of the following units:

89th Infantry Division organization (click to enlarge)

- 89th Infantry Division
  - 89th Infantry Division Headquarters
  - 89th Cavalry Reconnaissance Troop (Mechanized) (M3 scout cars and then M8 Greyhound armored cars)
  - 353rd Infantry Regiment
    - Headquarters and Headquarters Company
    - 3× Infantry battalions
      - each battalion consists of: 1× Headquarters and Headquarters Company, 3× Rifle companies, 1× Heavy Weapons Company
    - Cannon Company (T12 Gun Motor Carriages and T19 Howitzer Motor Carriages, later replaced by either M3 105mm towed howitzers or M7 Priest self propelled howitzers)
    - Anti-Tank Company (M3 37mm anti-tank guns, which were replaced by 1944 with M1 57mm anti-tank guns)
    - Service Company
  - 354th Infantry Regiment
    - same organization as 353rd Infantry Regiment
  - 355th Infantry Regiment
    - same organization as 353rd Infantry Regiment
  - 89th Infantry Division Artillery
    - Headquarters and Headquarters Battery
    - 340th Field Artillery Battalion
      - Headquarters and Headquarters Battery
      - 3× Batteries (M2 105mm towed howitzers)
      - Service Battery
    - 341st Field Artillery Battalion
      - same organization as 340th Field Artillery Battalion
    - 563rd Field Artillery Battalion
      - Headquarters and Headquarters Battery
      - 3× Batteries (M1 155mm towed howitzers)
      - Service Battery
    - 914th Field Artillery Battalion
      - same organization as 340th Field Artillery Battalion
  - Headquarters Special Troops
    - Headquarters Company, 89th Infantry Division
    - 89th Signal Company
    - 89th Quartermaster Company
    - 789th Ordnance Light Maintenance Company
    - Military Police Platoon
    - 89th Infantry Division Band (attached)
  - 314th Engineer Combat Battalion
    - Headquarters and Headquarters and Service Company
    - 3× Engineer combat companies
  - 314th Medical Battalion
    - Headquarters and Headquarters Detachment
    - 3× Collecting companies
    - Clearing Company

==== Combat chronicle ====
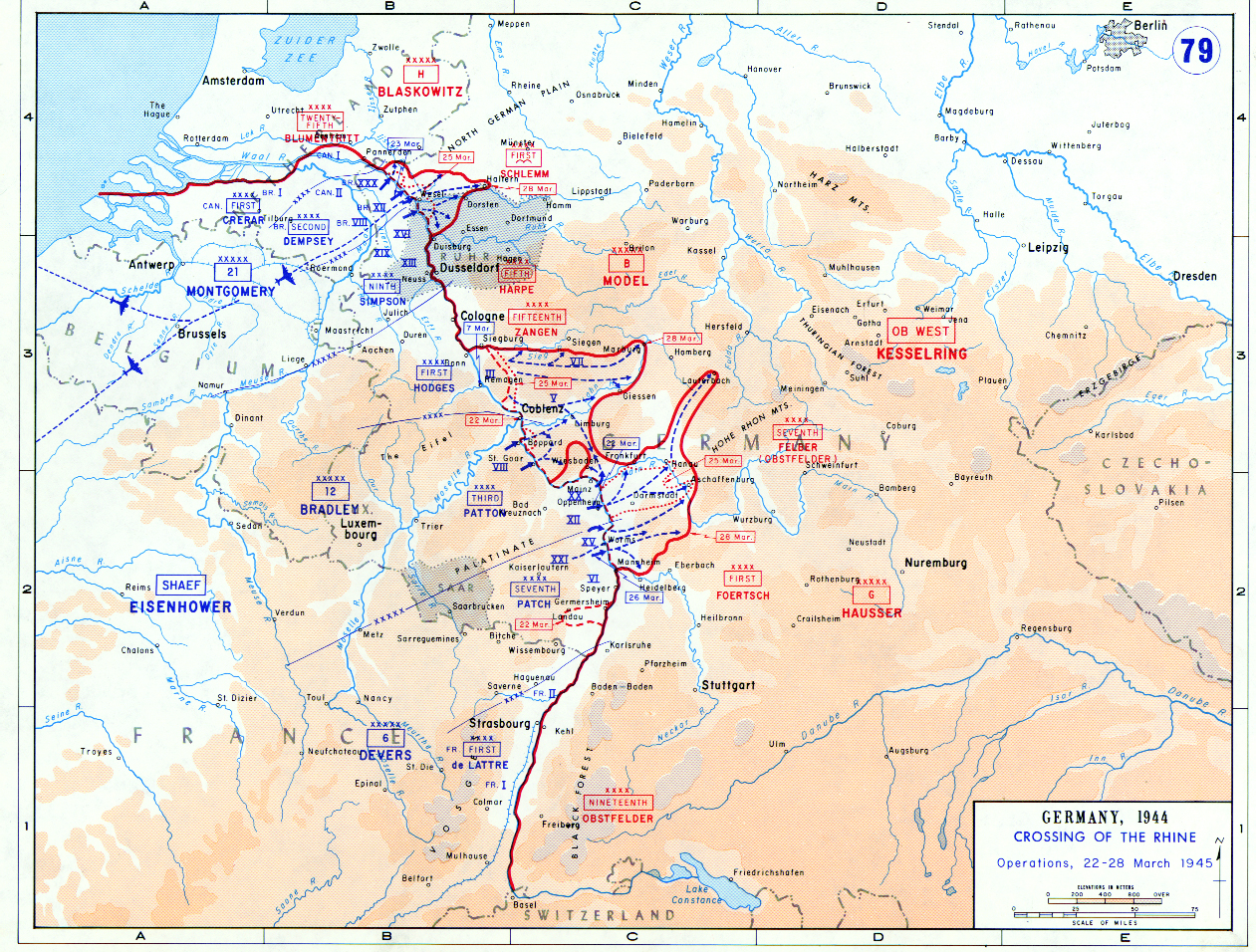
The crossing of the Rhine between 22 and 28 March 1945.

The 89th Infantry Division landed in France at Le Havre, 21 January 1945, and engaged in several weeks of precombat training before moving up to the Sauer River into jump-off positions east of Echternach, 11 March 1945. The next day, the offensive began, and the 89th plunged across the Sauer in a rapid advance to and across the Moselle, 17 March. The offensive rolled on, and the division assaulted across the Rhine River on 26 March 1945 under intense fire in the Wellmich-Oberwesel region. A pontoon bridge was built across the Rhine from St. Goar to St. Goarshausen. In April, the 89th attacked toward Eisenach, taking that town on 6 April. The next objective, Friedrichroda, was secured by 8 April. On 4 April 1945, the 89th overran Ohrdruf, a subcamp of the Buchenwald concentration camp. The division continued to move eastward toward the Mulde River, capturing Zwickau by 17 April. The advance was halted, 23 April, and from then until VE-day, the division saw only limited action, engaging in patrolling and general security. Three towns, Lößnitz, Aue, and Stollberg, were kept under constant pressure, but no attacks were launched.

==== World War II statistics ====
- Ordered into active service: 5 July 1942 at Camp Carson, Colorado
- Overseas: 10 January 1945.
- Campaigns: Rhineland, Central Europe
- Days of Combat: 57
- Entered Combat: 12 March 1945
- Killed in Action: 292
- Total Casualties: 1,029
- Awards: DSC-1; DSM-1; SS-46; LM-5; SM-1; BSM-135; AM-17.
- Commanders:Maj. Gen. William H. Gill (July 1942-February 1943), Maj. Gen. Thomas D. Finley (February 1943 to inactivation).
- Returned to United States: 16 December 1945.
- Inactivated: 27 December 1945 at Camp Kilmer, New Jersey

=== Postwar ===
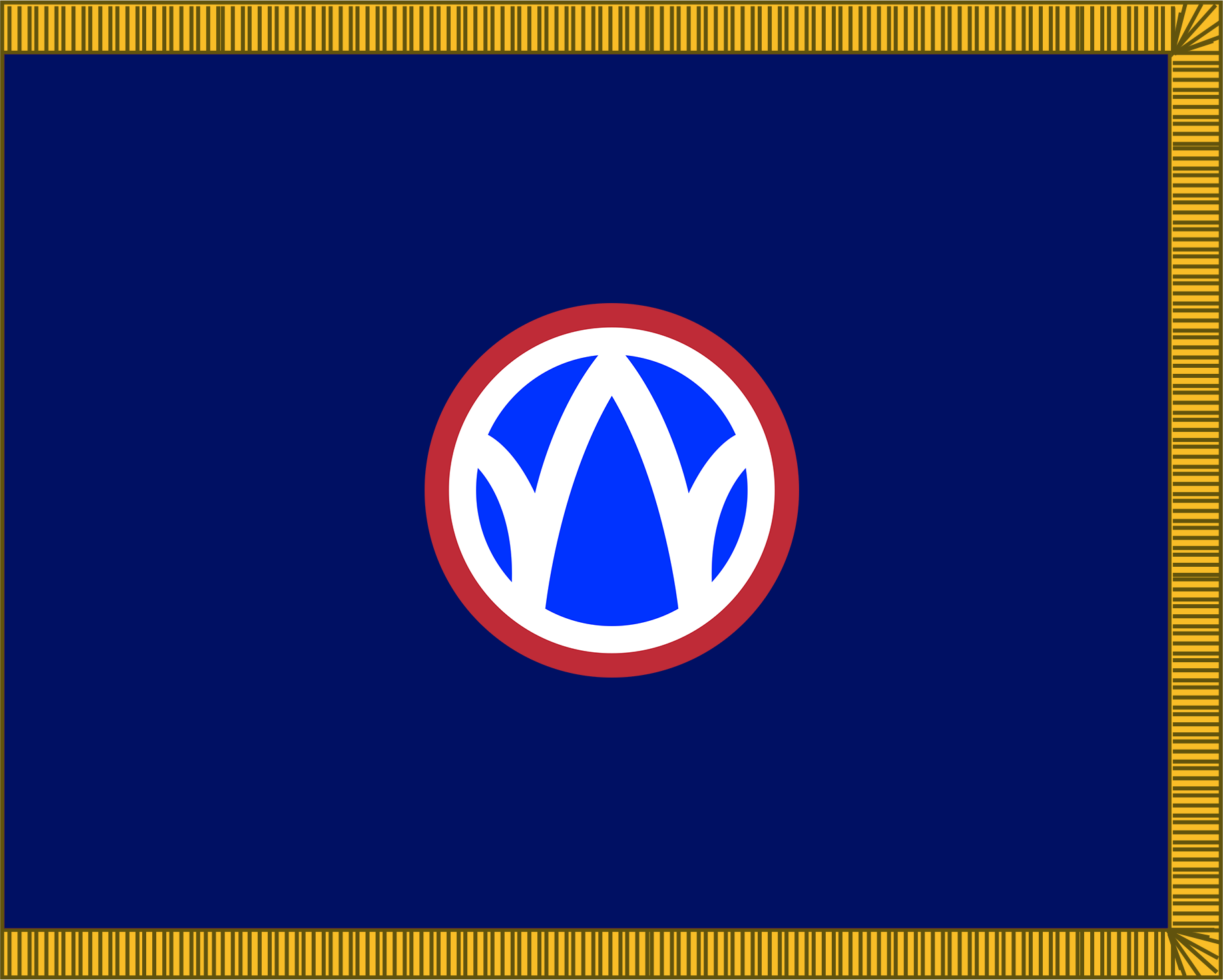
89th Army Reserve Command Flag

The 89th was reactivated as a Reserve unit in 1947 with headquarters in Wichita, Kansas and redesignated as the 89th Division (Training) in 1959. In 1973 the division colors were cased and the shoulder patch (but not the lineage and honors) was continued in use as the 89th Army Reserve Command (ARCOM); ARCOMs were not tactical commands, but were instead regional conglomerations of unrelated units. Upon mobilization, units within the ARCOMs would be assigned to active duty units with which they were aligned. The 89th ARCOM was later redesignated as the 89th Regional Support Command, and in 2003 it became the 89th Regional Readiness Command. In its 2005 BRAC recommendations, United States Department of Defense recommended realigning the Wichita U.S. Army Reserve Center by disestablishing the 89th Regional Readiness Command. This recommendation was part of a larger recommendation to reengineer and streamline the command and control structure of the Army Reserve that would create the Northwest Regional Readiness Command at Fort McCoy, Wisconsin. The 89th currently exists as the 89th Sustainment Brigade in the Reserve.

== Notable personnel ==
- Charles Denver Barger - Medal of Honor recipient
- David B. Barkley - Medal of Honor recipient
- Marcellus H. Chiles - Medal of Honor recipient
- Arthur J. Forrest - Medal of Honor recipient
- Jesse N. Funk - Medal of Honor recipient
- Harold A. Furlong – Medal of Honor recipient
- M. Waldo Hatler - Medal of Honor recipient
- Harold I. Johnston Medal of Honor recipient
- Charles E. Kilbourne - Medal of Honor and Distinguished Service Cross recipient who served as the 89th Division's chief of staff in World War I
- J. Hunter Wickersham - Medal of Honor recipient
- Milton C. Portmann Professional football player, Silver Star, Order of Leopold WWI
- Charles T. Payne - (great-uncle of Barack Obama, the 44th President of the United States)
- Marcelino Serna - the most decorated soldier from Texas in World War I.
- Ferdinand Louis Schlemmer – Division camouflage officer in World War I and noted artist in civilian life.
- Maurice Rose - future commander of the 3rd Armored Division during World War II who served with the 89th Division during World War I
- John C. H. Lee - future lieutenant general who served as aide-de-camp to Major General Leonard Wood at Ft. Riley, then as 89th Div. Chief of Staff in the AEF under MG Winn, and the youngest full-colonel in WWI.
- Brehon B. Somervell - served as G-4 Supply officer in France under Gen. Winn, and found his calling in military logistics. In the reorganization of the Army in the spring of 1942, he took command of the Services of Supply, later renamed Army Service Forces, and ran the administrative & supply 1/3rd of the Army for the duration of WWII.
- James H. Reeves Colonel, Commander of The 353rd, distinguished service medal, Citation l' Order 32nd corps France 1919, Military distinguished service medal and two silver stars for the Spanish–American War in Cuba.

== Bibliography ==
- 89th Infantry Division website: http://www.89infdivww2.org/index.htm.
- The Army Almanac: A Book of Facts Concerning the Army of the United States U.S. Government Printing Office, 1950 reproduced at
- Davis, Henry Blaine Jr. Generals in Khaki. Raleigh, NC: Pentland Press, 1998. ISBN 1571970886 OCLC 231779136
