= David B. Barkley =

American World War I soldier recipient of the Medal of Honor (1899–1918)

David Bennes Barkley
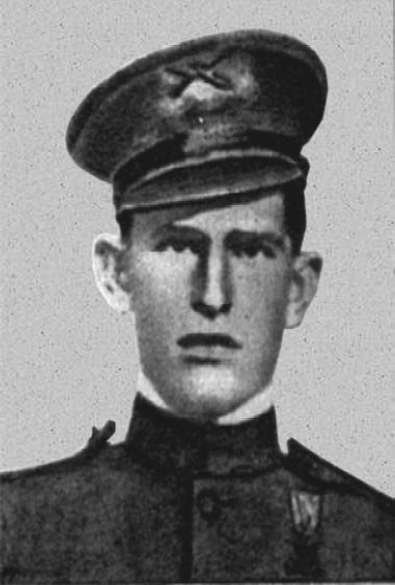
- David Bennes Barkley
- Born: March 31, 1899; Laredo, Texas, U.S.
- Died: November 9, 1918 (aged 19) near Pouilly-sur-Meuse, France
- Burial place: San Antonio National Cemetery
- Military career
- Allegiance: United States of America
- Branch: United States Army
- Service years: 1917–1918
- Rank: Private
- Units: 356th Infantry Regiment, 89th Division
- Conflicts: World War I
- Awards: Medal of Honor; Croix de Guerre; Croce al Merito di Guerra

David Bennes Barkley (also known as David B. Barkeley Cantu; March 31, 1899 – November 9, 1918) was an American soldier who was posthumously awarded the Medal of Honor for his heroic actions during World War I in France. After successfully completing a scouting mission behind enemy lines, he drowned while swimming back across the Meuse River near Pouilly-sur-Meuse.

== Biography ==
Barkley was born in Laredo, Webb County, Texas, to Joseph S. Barkley and the former Antonia Cantu. Joseph was a career soldier, and the couple married in Starr County, TX while Joseph was stationed at Ft Ringgold, TX. Deployed to Puerto Rico shortly after David's birth, the family remained in Texas. David grew up with his Mexican-American mother and younger sister while his father remained in the Army. David first enlisted in the Texas National Guard, entering the U.S. Army in April 1917, shortly after the U.S. entered World War I. He enlisted under his legal name, though some claim he used his Anglo father's name only to avoid being segregated into a non-combat unit.

Arriving in France with the 155th Infantry in August 1918, he was later assigned to Company A, 356th Infantry, 89th Division. Only days before the Armistice, he volunteered for a mission with Sergeant M. Waldo Hatler to swim across the Meuse River near Pouilly-sur-Meuse to get behind German lines and gather information about troop strength and deployments. They were able to gather the needed information; however, returning across the river, Barkley was "seized with cramps and drowned". (This is the exact wording from his citation, duplicated below.) Sergeant Hatler survived to bring the information back to their unit.

Barkley and Hatler were both awarded the Medal of Honor for their actions, one of three Texans to be awarded the Medal of Honor during World War I. Additionally, France awarded him the Croix de Guerre, and Italy the Croce al Merito di Guerra.

Private Barkley lay in state at the Alamo, the second person to receive this honor. He was then buried at the San Antonio National Cemetery.

== Rank and organization ==
Rank and organization: Private, U.S. Army, Company A, 356th Infantry, 89th Division. Place and date: Near Pouilly, France, November 9, 1918. Entered service at: San Antonio, Tex. Birth: Laredo, Tex. G.O. No.: 20, W.D., 1919. Citation

When information was desired as to the enemy's position on the opposite side of the Meuse River, Pvt. Barkeley, with another soldier, volunteered without hesitation and swam the river to reconnoiter the exact location. He succeeded in reaching the opposite bank, despite the evident determination of the enemy to prevent a crossing. Having obtained his information, he again entered the water for his return, but before his goal was reached, he was seized with cramps and drowned.

== In memory ==
Barkley has received notable posthumous recognition. In 1921, an elementary school in San Antonio, Texas, was named in his honor. On January 10, 1941, a U.S. Army installation, Camp Barkeley, was also named in his honor. A clerical error resulted in the discrepancy in spelling. His mother attended the dedication ceremony and met with surviving members of his unit, and her photo appeared in several Texas newspapers.

=== David B. Barkley Plaza ===
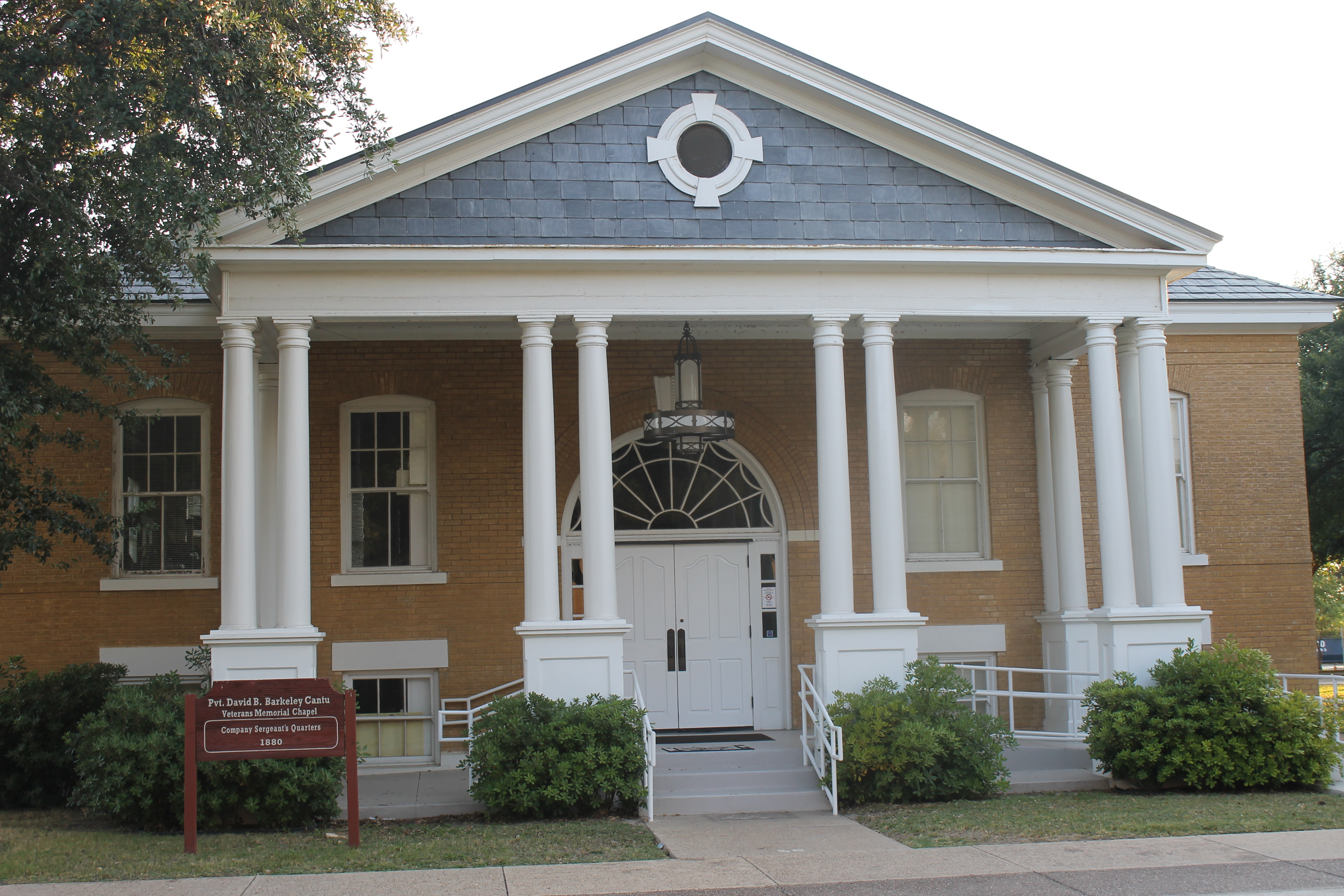
The David Barkeley Cantu Memorial Chapel at Laredo Community College

A memorial honoring the forty-one Hispanic soldiers who have received the Congressional Medal of Honor was built in Laredo in 2002 and named for Barkley. The David B. Barkley Plaza has a bronze statue of David B. Barkley and an American flag measuring 100 ft by 50 ft and is 308 ft tall making it the second tallest flagpole in the United States. The memorial was located at 27°30′22″N 99°30′8″W. On October 18, 2023, the statue was rededicated after the local PNC Bank gifted the statue to Laredo College where it was placed adjacent to the restored chapel at Laredo College which also bears Barkley's name in his honor.

Memorial Day and Veterans Day services are held there each year.

== Awards and decorations ==
David Bennes Barkley's awards and decorations include the following:

- Medal of Honor
- Purple Heart with Oak Leaf Cluster.
- World War I Victory Medal
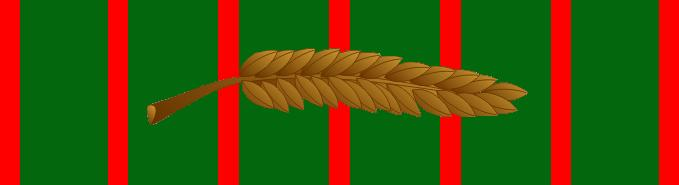
- French Croix de Guerre with Palm medals (2)
- Croce al Merito di Guerra (War Merit Cross)-Italy

== See also ==
- List of Hispanic Medal of Honor recipients
- List of Medal of Honor recipients
- List of Medal of Honor recipients for World War I
- Private Marcelino Serna who also served in the 86th Division and became the most decorated soldier from Texas in World War I.
