= 89th Sustainment Brigade =

89th Sustainment Brigade 89th Regional Readiness Command 89th Regional Support Command 89th Army Reserve Command
- 89th Sustainment Brigade insignia
- Active: 1974-1986; 1996-2003; 2003-2011; 2011-present
- Country: United States
- Branch: United States Army Reserve
- Type: Sustainment
- Size: Brigade
- Part of: 451st Expeditionary Sustainment Command
- Headquarters: Kansas City, Missouri
- Nickname: "The Rolling W"
- Motto: Get R Done

Commanders
- Commanding officer: COL Jodi Marang
- Command Sergeant Major: CSM Roquelle Castonguay

Insignia
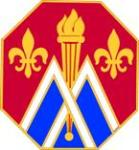
- Distinctive unit insignia

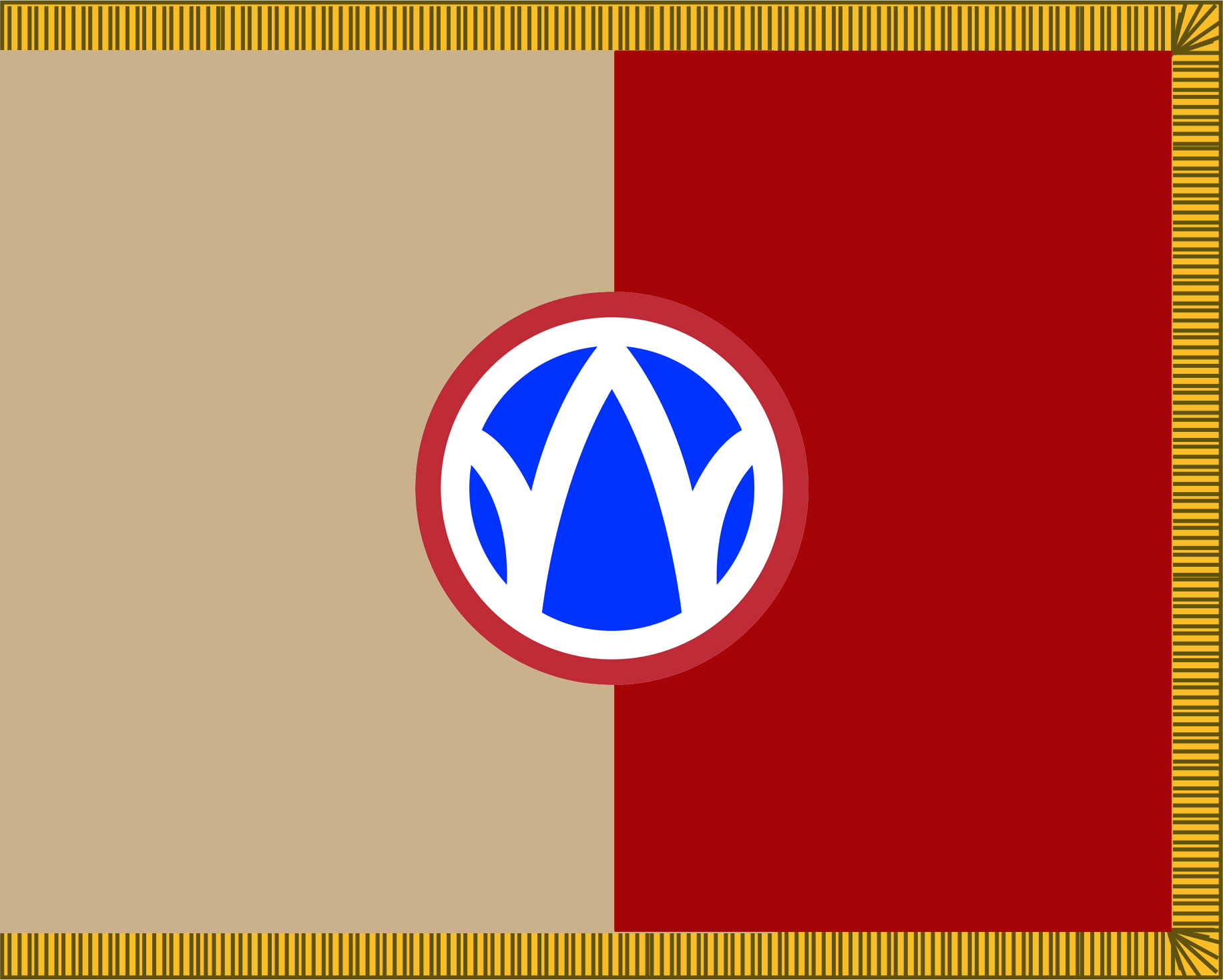
- 89th Sustainment Brigade Flag

The 89th Sustainment Brigade is a subordinate command of 451st Expeditionary Sustainment Command and one of only eight of its kind in the United States Army Reserve. The unit is the latest addition in the Army Transformation process for the 451st but will manage a peacetime downtrace that has command and control of approximately 1,700 Army Reservists located throughout the Kansas, Missouri, and Nebraska areas, and its Soldiers support diverse missions that are logistical in nature. Its mission is to plan, coordinate, synchronize, monitor, and control Logistics Operations within an assigned area of responsibility. The brigade also coordinates host nation support and contracting, as well as providing support to joint, interagency, and multinational forces as directed.

== Organization ==
The brigade is a subordinate unit of the 451st Expeditionary Sustainment Command. As of January 2026 the brigade consists of the following units:

- 89th Sustainment Brigade, in Kansas City (MO)
  - 89th Special Troops Battalion, in Kansas City (MO)
    - Headquarters and Headquarters Company, 89th Sustainment Brigade, in Kansas City (MO)
  - 329th Combat Sustainment Support Battalion, in Parsons (KS)
    - Headquarters and Headquarters Company, 329th Combat Sustainment Support Battalion, in Parsons (KS)
    - 387th Human Resources Company, in Wichita (KS)
      - 1st Platoon, 387th Human Resources Company, in Bethany (MO)
      - 5th Platoon (Postal), 387th Human Resources Company, in Bethany (MO)
    - 1011th Quartermaster Company (Supply), in Independence (KS)
      - Detachment 1, 1011th Quartermaster Company (Supply), in Beatrice (NE)
    - 368th Financial Management Support Unit, in Wichita (KS)
      - Detachment 2, 368th Financial Management Support Unit, in Lawrence (KS)
  - 484th Transportation Battalion (Movement Control), in Springfield (MO)
    - Headquarters and Headquarters Detachment, 484th Transportation Battalion (Movement Control), in Springfield (MO)
    - 428th Transportation Medium Truck Company (Cargo) (EAB Linehaul), in Jefferson City (MO)
      - Detachment 1, 428th Transportation Medium Truck Company (Cargo) (EAB Linehaul), in Springfield (MO)
    - 473rd Transportation Detachment (Movement Control Team), in Kansas City (MO)
    - 557th Transportation Detachment (Movement Control Team), in Springfield (MO)
    - 560th Transportation Detachment (Movement Control Team), in Springfield (MO)
    - 561st Transportation Detachment (Movement Control Team), in Springfield (MO)
    - 842nd Quartermaster Company (Petroleum Support), in Tonganoxie (KS)
  - 620th Combat Sustainment Support Battalion, in St. Louis (MO)
    - Headquarters and Headquarters Company, 620th Combat Sustainment Support Battalion, in St. Louis (MO)
    - 245th Ordnance Company (Support Maintenance), in St. Charles (MO)
      - 1st Platoon, 245th Ordnance Company (Support Maintenance), in Farmington (MO)
      - 2nd Platoon, 245th Ordnance Company (Support Maintenance), in Washington (MO)
    - 383rd Quartermaster Company (Petroleum Support), in Saint Charles (MO)
    - 824th Quartermaster Detachment (Petroleum Liaison Team), in Lawrence (KS)
    - 863rd Quartermaster Detachment (Petroleum Liaison Team), in Great Bend (KS)

Abbreviations: EAB — Echelon Above Brigade

== History ==
The 89th initially started as the 89th Division, activated on 27 August 1917, at Camp Funston, Kansas. The division was reactivated in 1921 as part of the Army Reserve when it expanded from a Medical Reserve Corps to the Officer Reserve Corps and Enlisted Reserve Corps. In 1942 the division was again called to active service at Camp Carson, Colorado, until 21 January 1945 when the 89th landed in France at Le Havre, for World War II. In 1947, the division was reactivated in the Army Reserve with its headquarters located in Wichita, Kansas. In 1959 it was re-designated the 89th Division (Training) and then in 1973 it became a United States Army Reserve Command (ARCOM). In 1995 it was again re-designated as the 89th Regional Support Command until late in 2003 when all the regional support commands were re-designated as regional readiness commands.

In 2009, the 89th RRC converted to the 89th Sustainment Brigade thus transforming to an MTOE command with a logistical sustainment mission to provide support to combat and combat support forces deployed in support of contingency and combat operations within the designated combatant commander's area of responsibility.

The 89th Sustainment Brigade was first activated 27 August 1917, as an Infantry Division at Camp Funston, Fort Riley, Kansas in support of World War I. It was deployed to France in 1918 and participated in the Lorraine Campaign, St. Mehiel Campaign and the Meuse Argonne Post War Campaign.

The division was reactivated in 1921 as part of the Army Reserve when it expanded from a Medical Reserve Corps to the Officer Reserve Corps and Enlisted Reserve Corps. In 1942 the division was again called to active service at Camp Carson, Colorado until 21 January 1945 when the 89th landed in France at Le Havre, for World War II. On 11 March 1945 the 89th moved up the Sauer River into jump-off position east of Echternach. On 17 March, they pushed forward through Moselle, and on 26 March crossed the Rhine between the towns of Kestert and Kaub. On 6 April, they took the town of Eisenach, and pushed forward towards their next objective Friedrichroda, core of the vaulted Nazi Redoubt in Thuringia. The city was secured by 8 April, and the division continued eastward toward the Mulde River, capturing Zwickau by the 17th of April. The advance was halted on 23 April, and from then until VE-Day the division saw only limited action, engaging in patrolling and general security missions. Three towns, Lossnitz, Aue and Stollberg, were kept under constant pressure, but no attacks were launched during that time.

In 1947, the division was reactivated in the Army Reserve with its headquarters located in Wichita, Kansas. In 1959 it was re-designated the 89th Division (Training) and then in 1973 it became a United States Army Reserve Command (ARCOM).

In 1995 it was again re-designated as the 89th Regional Support Command until late in 2003 when all the Regional Support Commands were re-designated as Regional Readiness Commands.

The 89th Sustainment Command has since supplied over 12,000 soldiers for Desert Shield/Desert Storm, operations in Haiti, Bosnia, Kosovo, as well as small scale contingencies around the world.

== Shoulder sleeve insignia ==
On a blue disc 1 5/8 inches (4.1 cm) in diameter and within a white annulet 3/16 inch (0.48 cm) in width a white letter "W" formed of curved lines 3/16 in (0.48 cm) in width and joining the annulet, all within a 1/8 inch (0.32 cm) red border. The overall dimension is 2 1/4 inches (5.7 cm) in diameter. Red, white, and blue are the national colors. The stylized "W" which when reversed becomes an "M," refers to this division, known in the past as the "Middle West Division," since many of its personnel came from the Midwestern states.

The shoulder sleeve insignia was originally approved for the 89th Division on 25 October 1918 by telegram but not officially announced by the War Department until 23 June 1922. It was amended on 21 December 1948, to change the colors and reword the measurements. The insignia was approved for the 89th U.S. Army Reserve Command on 26 July 1974. On 16 April 1996, the insignia was reassigned and approved for the 89th Regional Support Command. It was redesignated effective 16 July 2003, for the US Army 89th Regional Readiness Command. The insignia was redesignated effective 16 September 2009, for the 89th Sustainment Brigade and amended to add a symbolism.

== Distinctive unit insignia ==
A gold color metal and enamel device 1 1/8 (2.86 cm) in height overall consisting of a red octagon (two vertical sides longer than the other six sides which are all equal) charged with a gold torch between two gold fleurs-de-lis, in base two white chevronels in front of the torch base with the internal area blue. The elements of the design reflect the history of the 89th Division, for whom the insignia was originally authorized: The gold torch symbolizes the 89th Division's peacetime role as a training unit. The two fleurs-de-lis allude to the division's service in France during World Wars I and II. The chevronels represent support and also simulate the letter "M" for "Midwest," the geographical source of the division's original personnel. The chevronels over the blue background also allude to the crossing of the Rhine River by the division in World War II.

The distinctive unit insignia was originally authorized for the 89th Division (Training) on 29 May 1969. It was authorized for the 89th U.S. Army Reserve Command on 26 July 1974. On 16 April 1996, the insignia was reassigned and authorized for the 89th Regional Support Command. The insignia was redesignated for the U.S. Army 89th Regional Readiness Command effective 16 July 2003. It was redesignated effective 18 September 2009, for the 89th Sustainment Brigade.
