= M. Waldo Hatler =

American Army sergeant and Medal of Honor recipient

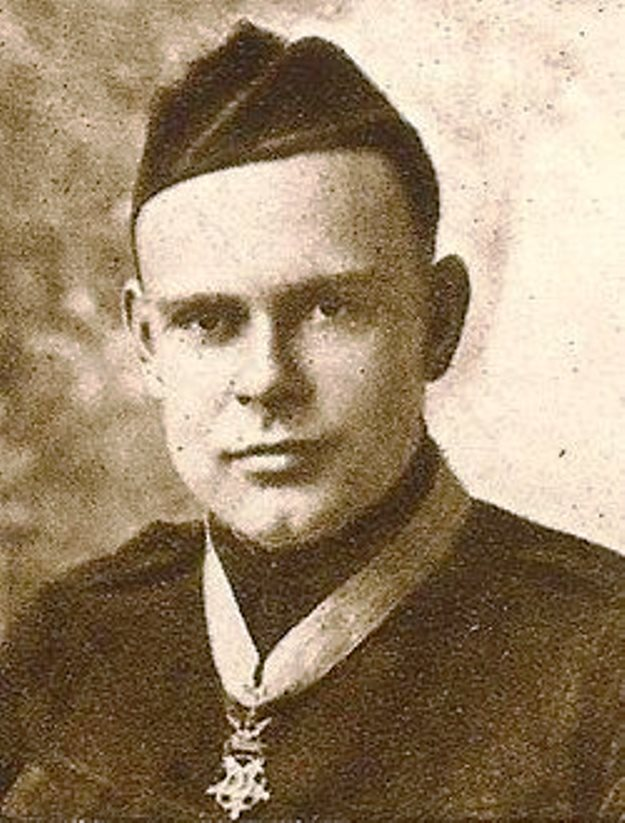
- Medal of Honor recipient
- Born: January 6, 1894; Bolivar, Missouri
- Died: August 31, 1967 (aged 73)
- Burial place: Grand Army of the Republic Cemetery, Sulphur Springs, Arkansas
- Military career
- Allegiance: United States of America
- Branch: United States Army
- Rank: Sergeant
- Service number: 2199881
- Conflicts: World War I
- Awards: Medal of Honor

Marcus Waldo Hatler (January 6, 1894 - August 31, 1967) was a Sergeant in the United States Army during World War I who received the Medal of Honor for heroism near Pouilly, France, November 8, 1918.

== Biography ==
M. Waldo Hatler was born January 6, 1894, at Bolivar, Missouri, elder of two sons of Troy and Rose Hatler. His father was a banker and real estate developer. Waldo graduated from the University of Michigan Law School in 1914 but never practiced law, instead following his father into banking and real estate. He was working in his father's bank at Neosho, Missouri when the United States entered World War I. He attempted to secure a commission in the navy but was turned down for medical reasons. He later waived exemption to the draft and was inducted into the army from Neosho. Assigned to Company B, 356th Infantry, he had risen to the rank of sergeant when, just days before the armistice, his regiment was halted by the enemy in its advance toward Germany at the Meuse River near the French village of Pouilly. Information relative to enemy strength and disposition on the opposite bank was vitally needed and Hatler along with David B. Barkley gathered the information. Both received the Medal of Honor.

Extensive biographical and autobiographical information is contained in The M. Waldo Hatler Story, a book compiled and published by in 1968 by his widow Margaret Hatler, using the Ozarkana Book Press (Neosho, Mo.) imprint.

M. Waldo Hatler is buried at Grand Army of the Republic Cemetery, Sulphur Springs, Arkansas.

== Medal of Honor citation ==
Rank and organization: Sergeant, U.S. Army, Company B, 356th Infantry, 89th Division. Place and date: Near Pouilly, France, November 8, 1918. Entered service at: Neosho, Mo. Born: January 6, 1894, Bolivar, Mo. G.O. No.: 74, W.D., 1919.

Citation:

When volunteers were called for to secure information as to the enemy's position on the opposite bank of the Meuse River, Sgt. Hatler was the first to offer his services for this dangerous mission. Swimming across the river, he succeeded in reaching the German lines, after another soldier, who had started with him, had been seized with cramps and drowned in midstream. Alone he carefully and courageously reconnoitered the enemy's positions, which were held in force, and again successfully swam the river, bringing back information of great value.

== See also ==
- List of Medal of Honor recipients
- List of Medal of Honor recipients for World War I
