= Marcelino Serna =

United States soldier from Mexican origin, receiver of the Distinguished Service Cross

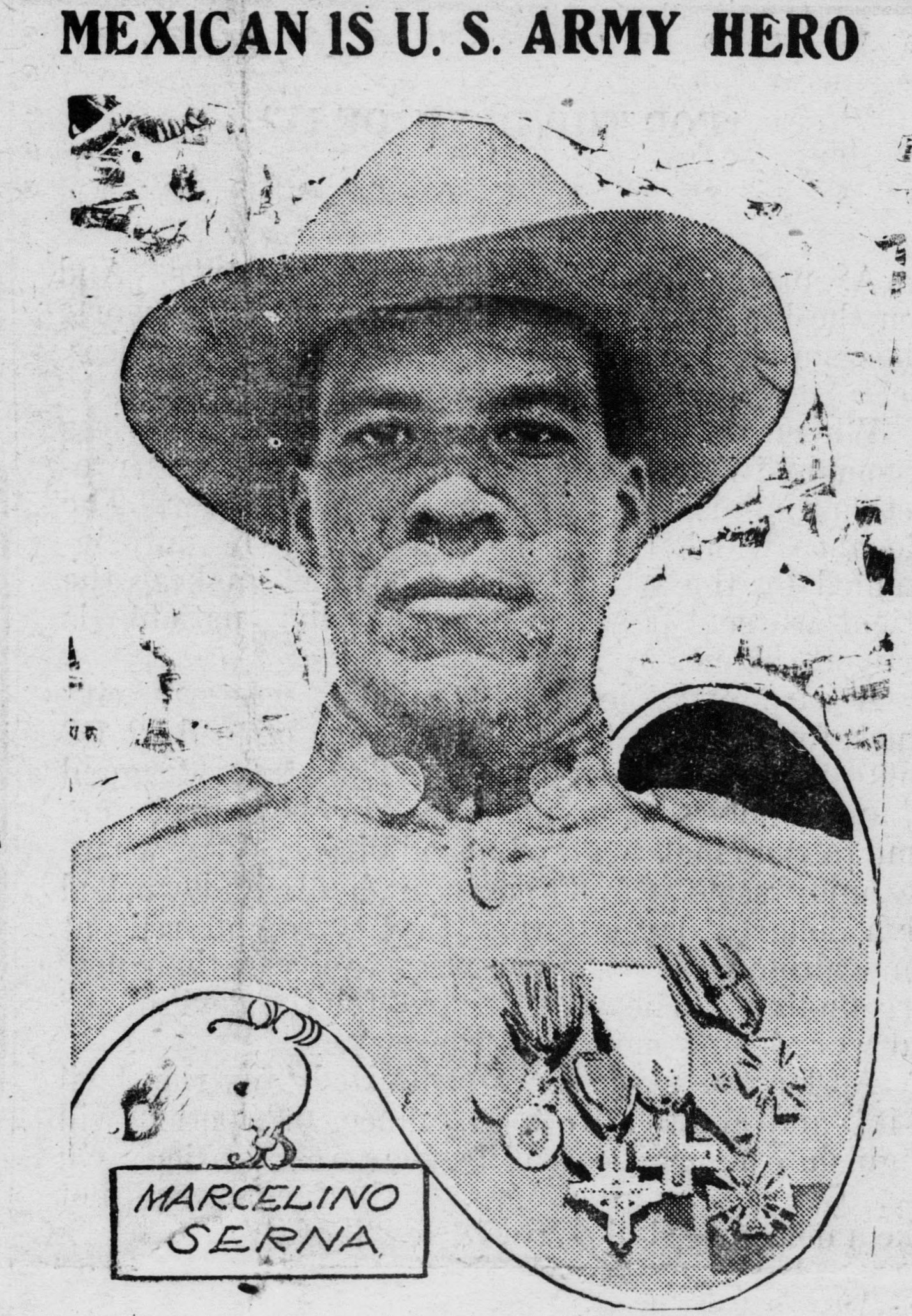
- Private Marcelino Serna, first Hispanic to be awarded the Distinguished Service Cross
- Born: April 26, 1896; Chihuahua, Chih., Mexico
- Died: February 29, 1992 (aged 95); El Paso, Texas
- Military career
- Allegiance: United States
- Branch: United States Army
- Service years: 1917-1919
- Rank: Private
- Units: Company B, 355th Infantry of the 89th Division
- Conflicts: World War I *Lucey Sector; *Puvenelle Sector; *Meuse-Argonne; *Battle of Saint-Mihiel; *Ennezin
- Awards: Distinguished Service Cross; Purple Heart with Oak Leaf Cluster; French Croix de Guerre with Palm (2x); War Merit Cross (Italy)

Private Marcelino Serna (April 26, 1896 – February 29, 1992) was a Mexican who enlisted as an American soldier and settled from El Paso, Texas. He became one of the most decorated soldiers from Texas in World War I. Serna was the first Hispanic to be awarded the Distinguished Service Cross.

== Early years ==
Serna was born in the city of Chihuahua, in the Mexican state of Chihuahua, to a poor family. In 1916, when he was 20 years old, Serna decided to enter the United States by crossing the Rio Grande and going to El Paso, Texas, in search of a job and a better way of life. Serna did not speak English, and he was only able to find low-paying jobs. He soon found himself working as a farm hand in a sugar beet field in Denver, Colorado.

The United States declared war on Germany on April 6, 1917. Serna was with a group of men in Denver when he was picked up by federal officials. He faced the possibility of being deported, but before that could happen, he volunteered to serve in the Army.

== World War I ==
After his basic training, Serna was sent overseas and assigned to Company B, 355th Infantry Regiment, 89th Division. When the Army realized that he was a Mexican national, he was offered a discharge. Serna, however, chose to stay with his new friends.

Serna's unit was ordered to advance towards the Meuse River and Argonne Forest in France. When his unit arrived at Saint-Mihiel, they encountered a German machine gunner who killed 13 soldiers. Serna crawled up to the machine gunner's left flank. Even though his helmet was hit twice by bullets, Serna was able to get close enough to throw four grenades into the nest. Eight Germans surrendered and the rest were dead.

On September 12, 1918, Serna's unit was engaged in combat inside the Meuse-Argonne region when he spotted a German sniper and wounded him with his Enfield rifle. Serna followed the wounded soldier to a trench. He threw three grenades into the trench, which resulted in the death of 26 enemy soldiers and the capture of 24.

Serna was wounded in both of his legs by sniper fire, four days before the Armistice. During his recovery, General John J. Pershing, Commander-in-Chief of the American Expeditionary Forces, pinned on his chest the Distinguished Service Cross, the second highest military decoration of the United States Army to the Medal of Honor. Serna was told by an officer that a "'buck' private" was not eligible for the Medal of Honor, and that he could not be promoted because he did not know enough English. Private David B. Barkley, who also served in the 89th Division, was awarded the Medal of Honor for his actions. Years later, it was discovered that Barkley was Hispanic, thus the only Hispanic recipient of the Medal of Honor in World War I. Field Marshal Ferdinand Foch, Supreme Commander of the Allied forces, awarded Serna the French Croix de Guerre for bravery.

== Distinguished Service Cross Citation ==

SERNA, MARCELINO
Private, U.S. Army
Company B, 355th Infantry Regiment, 89th Division, A.E.F.
Date of Action: September 12, 1918
Citation:

"The Distinguished Service Cross is presented to Marcelino Serna, Private, U.S. Army, for extraordinary heroism in action near Flirey, France, September 12, 1918. Private Serna displayed exceptional coolness and courage in single handed charging and capturing 24 Germans." General Orders No. 27, W.D., 1919 Home Town: Fort Morgan, CO.

== Later years ==
Serna returned to the U.S. as the most decorated soldier from Texas and was discharged at Camp Bowie, Texas in May 1919. In 1924, Serna became a United States citizen and soon after he married and settled down in El Paso, Texas. He went to work at the Peyton Packing Company. In 1960, he retired as a plumber from William Beaumont Hospital. On February 29, 1992, Marcelino Serna died at the age of 95. He was buried with full military honors at Fort Bliss National Cemetery, of El Paso, Texas.

On January 17, 1995, Congressman Ronald D'Emory Coleman introduced legislation before the House of Representatives that requested that Serna be awarded the Medal of Honor posthumously, to no avail.

In 2007 at the 78th Annual LULAC (League of United Latin American Citizens) Convention, the following resolution was adopted by the National Assembly: Congressional Medal of Honor Recommendation for Guy Louis Gabaldon, Rafael Peralta and Marcelino Serna.

On September 29, 2016, the United States designated the Customs and Border Protection Port of Entry located at 1400 Lower Island Road in Tornillo, Texas, as the "Marcelino Serna Port of Entry."

In 2020 it was reported that "Private Marcelino Serna did not receive the Medal of Honor due to him being a Mexican American and an immigrant.”

On March 2, 2022, Serna was awarded the Texas Legislative Medal of Honor for his actions on September 12, 1918.

== Awards and decorations ==
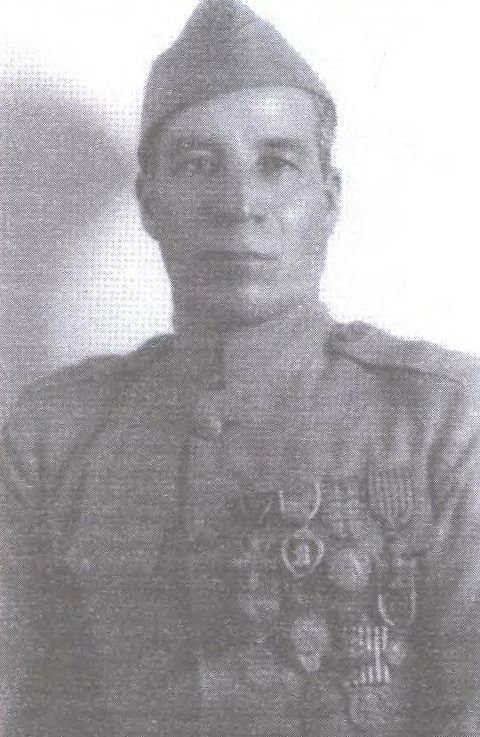
Marcelino Serna

Among Serna's many military decorations are the following: (Note: According to some cited references, such as Borderlands, Serna was awarded the "British Medal of Honor". There is not, nor has ever been, such a decoration.)

| Distinguished Service Cross |
| Purple Heart with oak leaf cluster |
| World War I Victory Medal |
| French Croix de Guerre with Palm (2) (France) |
| French Médaille militaire (France) |
| Croce al Merito di Guerra (Italy) |
| French Commemorative Medal (France) |
| 1914–1918 Inter-Allied Victory medal (France) (France) |
| St. Mihiel Medal (France) |
| Verdun Medal (France) |
| Texas Legislative Medal of Honor (Texas) |

== See also ==
- Private David Bennes Barkley who also served in the 89th Division and was the only Hispanic recipient of the Medal of Honor in World War I.
