= Grand View Burial Park, Hannibal =

Cemetery in Ralls County, Missouri

Coordinates: 39°40′05″N 91°24′52″W

Grand View Burial Park
- Interactive map of Grand View Burial Park

Details
- Established: 1934
- Location: Hannibal, Missouri
- No. of interments: Over 13,000

Grand View Burial Park is a cemetery in Hannibal, Missouri, developed in 1934 as a memorial cemetery.

The first burial was on May 11, 1934. Two more burials were performed in May and 19 more during the rest of 1934. During an average year, approximately 225 burials are performed.

In 1981 Grand View Funeral Home was opened adjacent to the memorial park. In 2021 the total number of interments in the memorial park exceeded 13,000.

== Notable burials ==
- Arthur J. Forrest (1895–1964), World War I Medal of Honor recipient
- Edward V. Long (1908–1972), US Senator
