= Camp Barkeley =

US Army training installation during World War II in Texas

Coordinates: 32.357°N 99.867°W

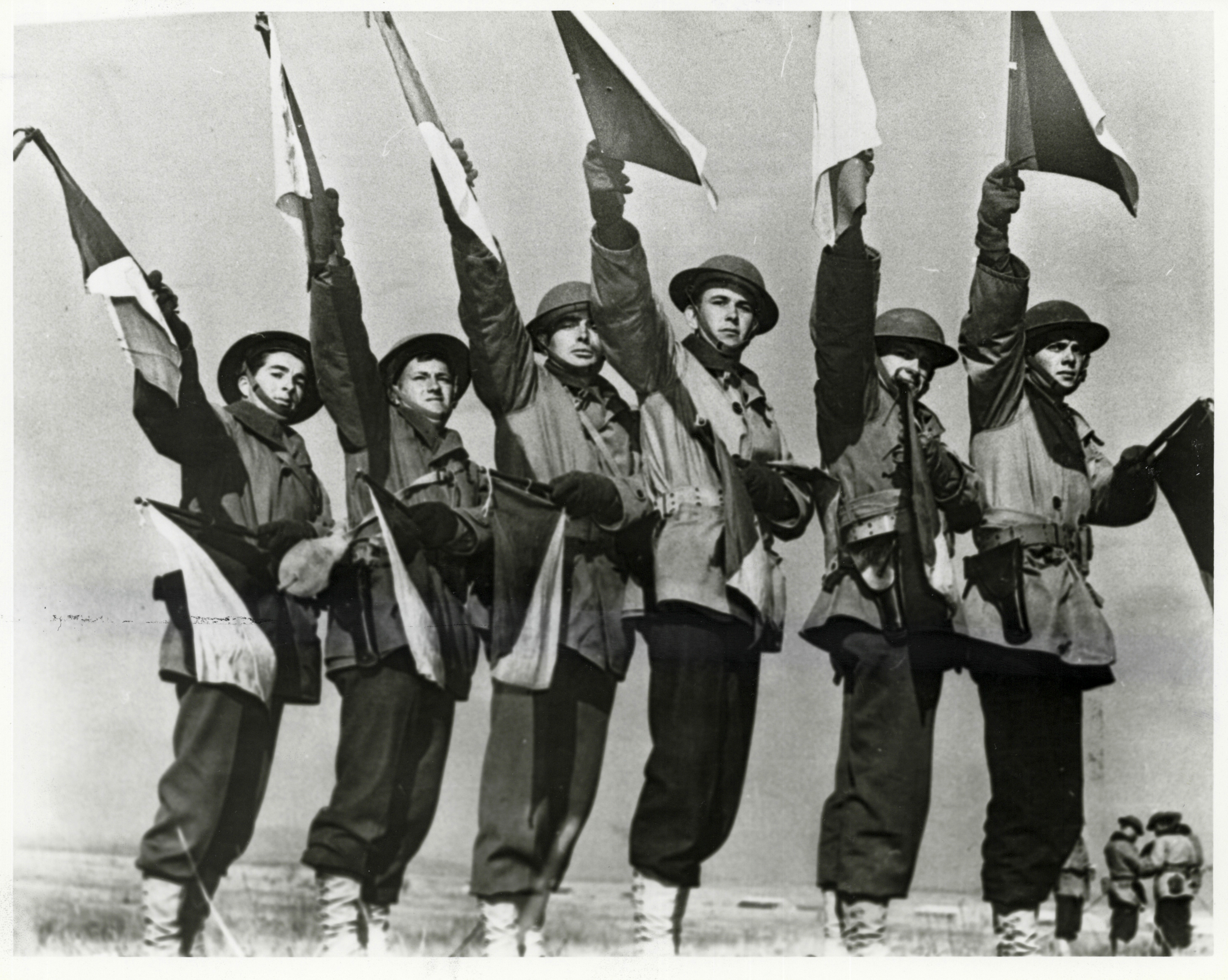
Photo taken at Camp Barkeley, Texas, on April 23, 1941

Camp Barkeley was a large United States Army training installation during World War II. The base was located eleven miles (18 km) southwest of Abilene, Texas, near what is now Dyess Air Force Base. The base was named after David B. Barkley, a Medal of Honor recipient during World War I; a clerical error is believed to have caused the spelling discrepancy, which stuck. The camp was 70,229 acres (284.21 km^{2}) in size and had a population of 50,000 at its peak of operation.

Construction of the camp began in December 1940 and was completed in July 1941. Before it was finished, the 19,000 man 45th Infantry Division, which had been at Fort Sill, Oklahoma, on a temporary basis, began to occupy the camp. Other units that trained at the camp include the 11th Armored Division and the 12th Armored Division. The Medical Administrative Corps Officer Candidate School was established at Barkeley in May 1942. In 1942, the Abilene Army Air Field opened nearby to train pilots. The field was renamed Dyess Air Force Base in 1956.

On February 1, 1944, the 1846th Unit POW Camp was activated at Camp Barkeley. At its peak, in March 1945, the POW camp housed 840 German prisoners. According to Krammer, "the few escape attempts invariably found the German prisoners sleeping in the bandstand in Abilene's central park."

Camp Barkeley was officially closed in September 1945 and dismantled. The land, which was leased, reverted to the original landowners.

== See also ==
- List of World War II prisoner-of-war camps in the United States
