= Jesse N. Funk =

United States Army soldier

Jesse Nathaniel Funk
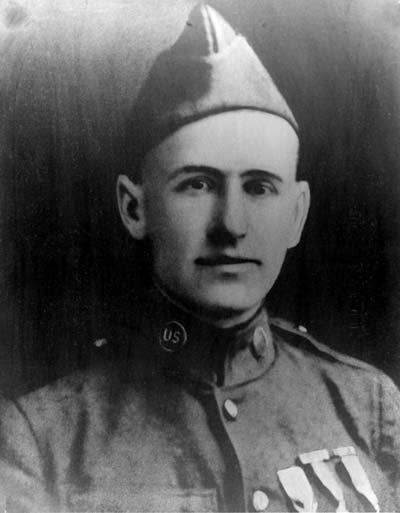
- Corporal Jesse N. Funk
- Born: August 20, 1888; New Hampton, Missouri, US
- Died: March 21, 1933 (aged 44)
- Military career
- Allegiance: United States
- Branch: United States Army
- Service years: 1915 - 1920
- Rank: Corporal
- Service number: 2187583
- Units: 354th Infantry Regiment, 89th Division
- Conflicts: World War I • Battle of Saint-Mihiel • Meuse–Argonne offensive
- Awards: Medal of Honor

Corporal Jesse Nathaniel Funk (August 20, 1888 – March 21, 1933) was a United States Army soldier and a recipient of the United States military's highest decoration, the Medal of Honor, for his actions in World War I. He earned the medal while serving as a stretcher bearer during the Meuse–Argonne offensive, when he and another soldier, Charles D. Barger, entered no man's land despite heavy fire and rescued two wounded officers.

== Biography ==
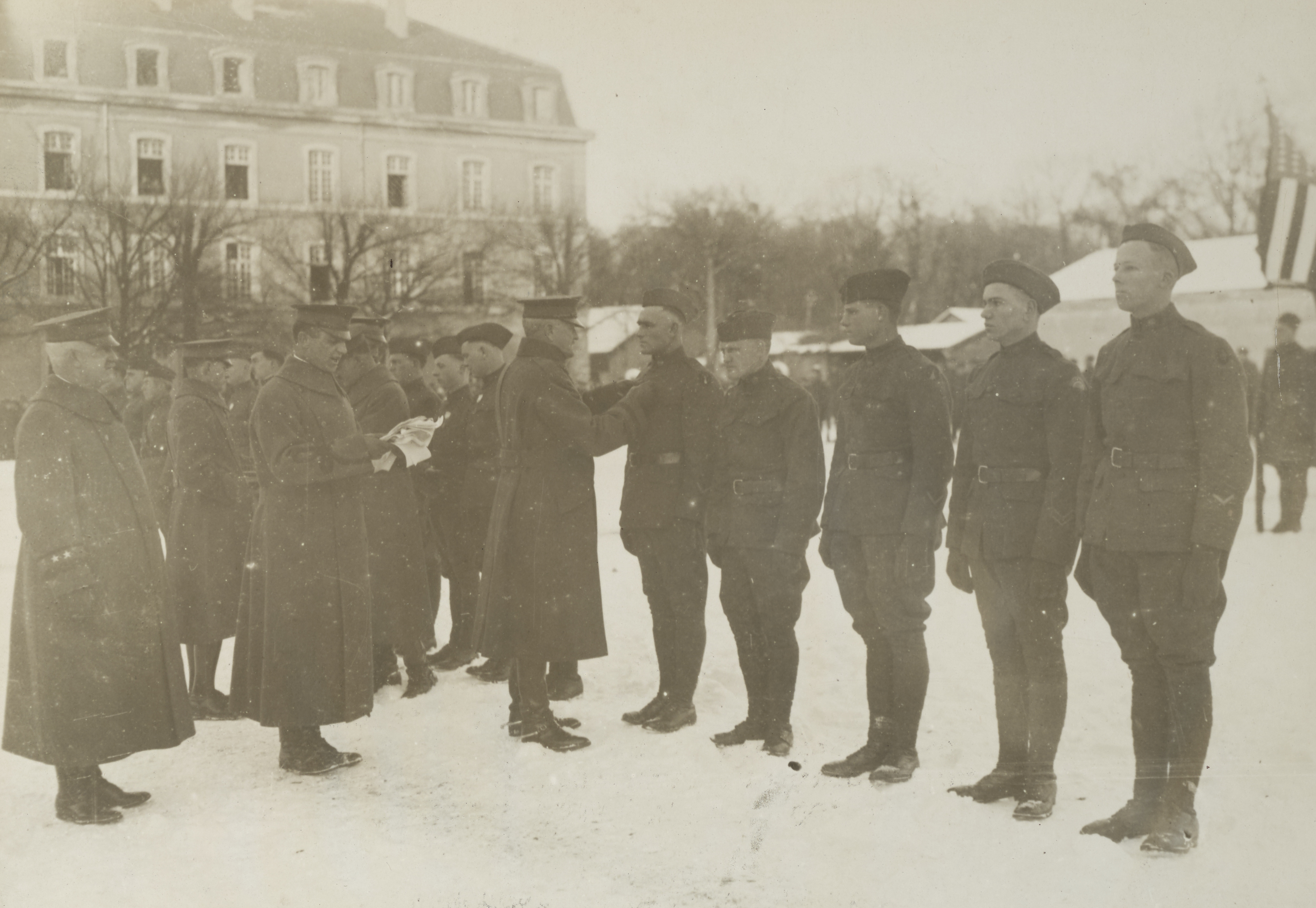
General John J. Pershing presenting the Medal of Honor to Corporal Jesse N. Funk of Company L, 354th Infantry, 89th Division, outside Pershing's headquarters at Chaumont, France, February 1919.

Born in New Hampton, Missouri, Funk later moved to Calhan, Colorado, where he worked as a rancher. He married and had one son before entering the Army in 1915.

After training at Camp Funston in Kansas, Funk was sent to Europe with the 354th Infantry Regiment, 89th Division. He saw action in the Battle of Saint-Mihiel and, by October 31, 1918, was a private first class serving as a stretcher bearer in the 354th Regiment's Company L. On that day, near Bois-de-Bantheville, France, Funk's division sent several patrols into no man's land to reconnoiter German positions in preparation for an advance as part of the Meuse-Argonne Offensive. Unusually, the patrols had been sent out during daylight, rather than waiting for the cover of darkness. Two patrols from Funk's regiment became pinned down by heavy rifle and machine gun fire. Second Lieutenant John M. Millis was seriously wounded in the legs and ordered his men to leave without him. One man managed to crawl to the safety of the Allied lines and brought news that Millis and another wounded officer were trapped in no man's land.

Upon hearing this, Funk and another stretcher bearer, Private First Class Charles D. Barger, voluntarily ran 500 yards (460 m) through heavy machine gun fire with their stretcher and rescued Millis. They then returned to no man's land and rescued the other officer, First Lieutenant Ernest G. Rowell. For these actions, both Funk and Barger were awarded the Medal of Honor the next year. These were the only Medals of Honor received by Army medical personnel in World War I.

Funk reached the rank of corporal before leaving the Army in 1920. He died at age 44 following unsuccessful surgery for appendicitis.

== Medal of Honor Citation ==
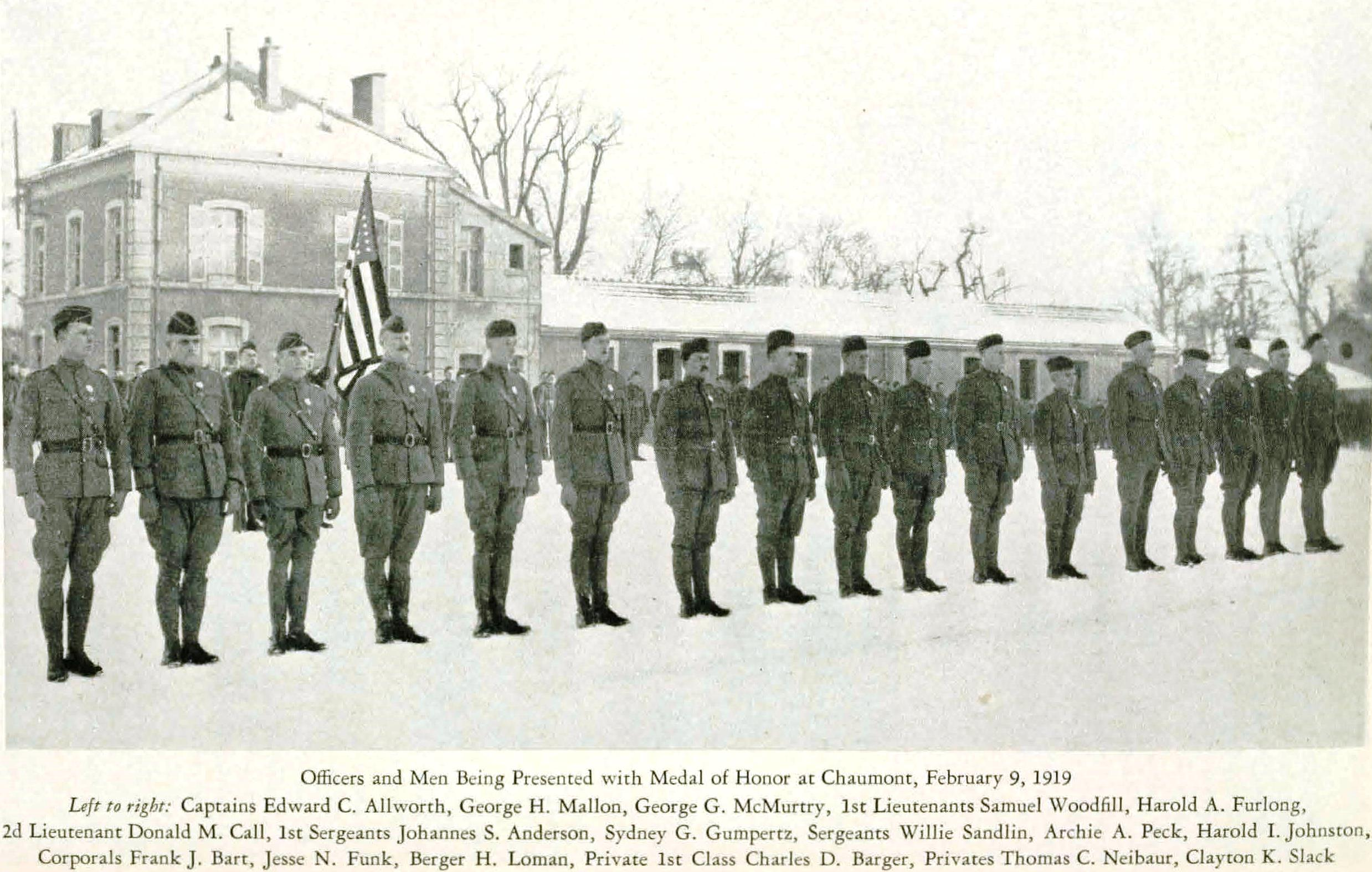
Medal of Honor Presentation Ceremony - February 9, 1919, at Chaumont, France. General John J. Pershing presided.

Funk's official Medal of Honor citation reads:

Learning that 2 daylight patrols had been caught out in No Man's Land and were unable to return, Pfc. Funk and another stretcher bearer, upon their own initiative, made 2 trips 500 yards beyond our lines, under constant machinegun fire, and rescued 2 wounded officers.

== Military awards ==
Funk's military decorations and awards include:(more research needed)

1st row	Medal of Honor

== See also ==
- List of Medal of Honor recipients
- List of Medal of Honor recipients for World War I
