= New Hampton, Missouri =

- City
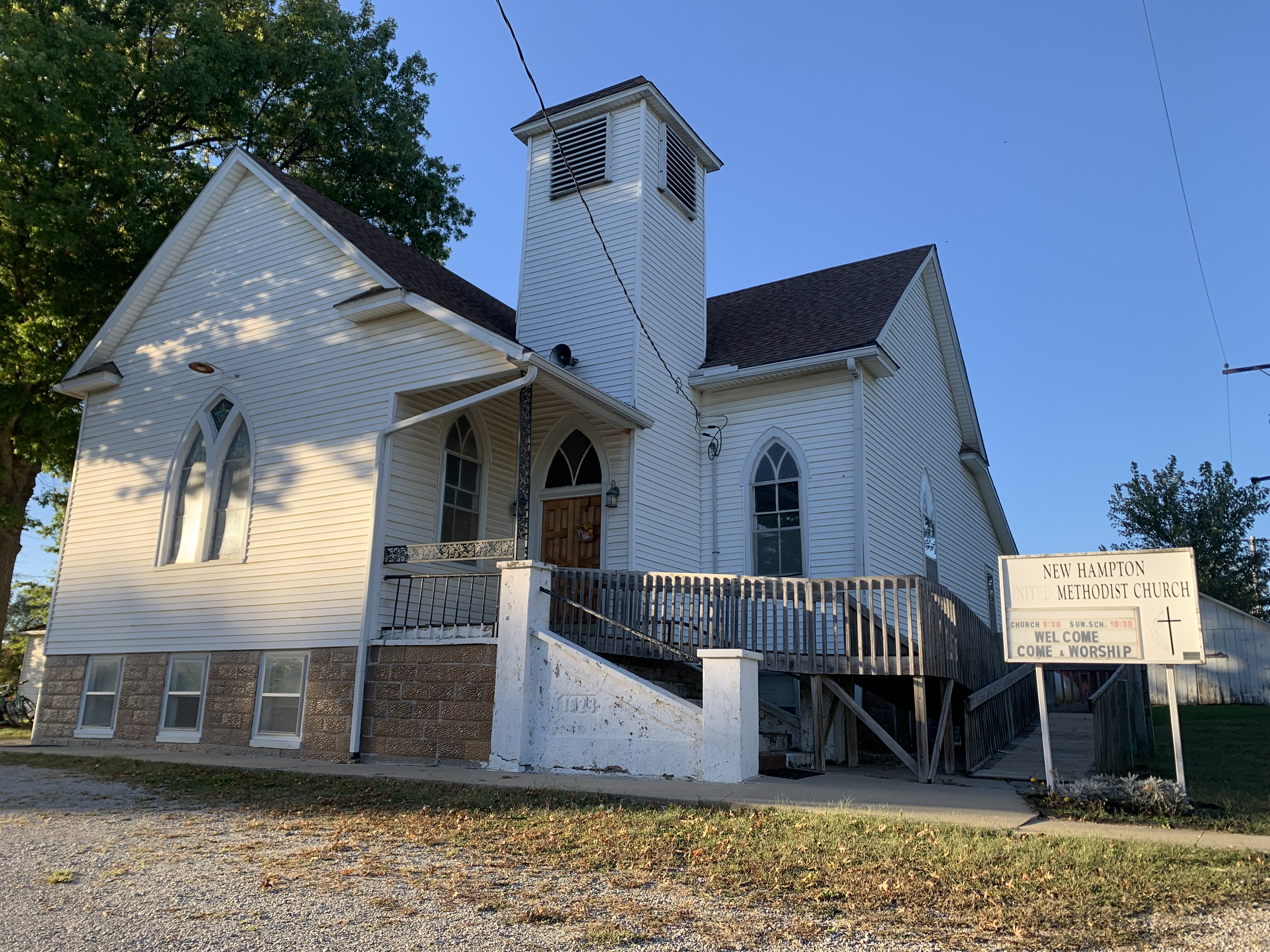
- Methodist Church in New Hampton

- Location of New Hampton, Missouri
- Coordinates: 40°15′55″N 94°11′43″W
- Country: United States
- State: Missouri
- County: Harrison

Area
  - Total: 0.55 sq mi (1.42 km^{2})
  - Land: 0.55 sq mi (1.42 km^{2})
  - Water: 0 sq mi (0.00 km^{2})
- Elevation: 994 ft (303 m)

Population (2020)
  - Total: 228
  - Density: 415.5/sq mi (160.44/km^{2})
- Time zone: UTC-6 (Central (CST))
  - Summer (DST): UTC-5 (CDT)
- ZIP code: 64471
- Area code: 660
- FIPS code: 29-51860
- GNIS feature ID: 2395197

New Hampton is a city in southwest Harrison County, Missouri, United States. The population was 228 at the 2020 census.

== History ==
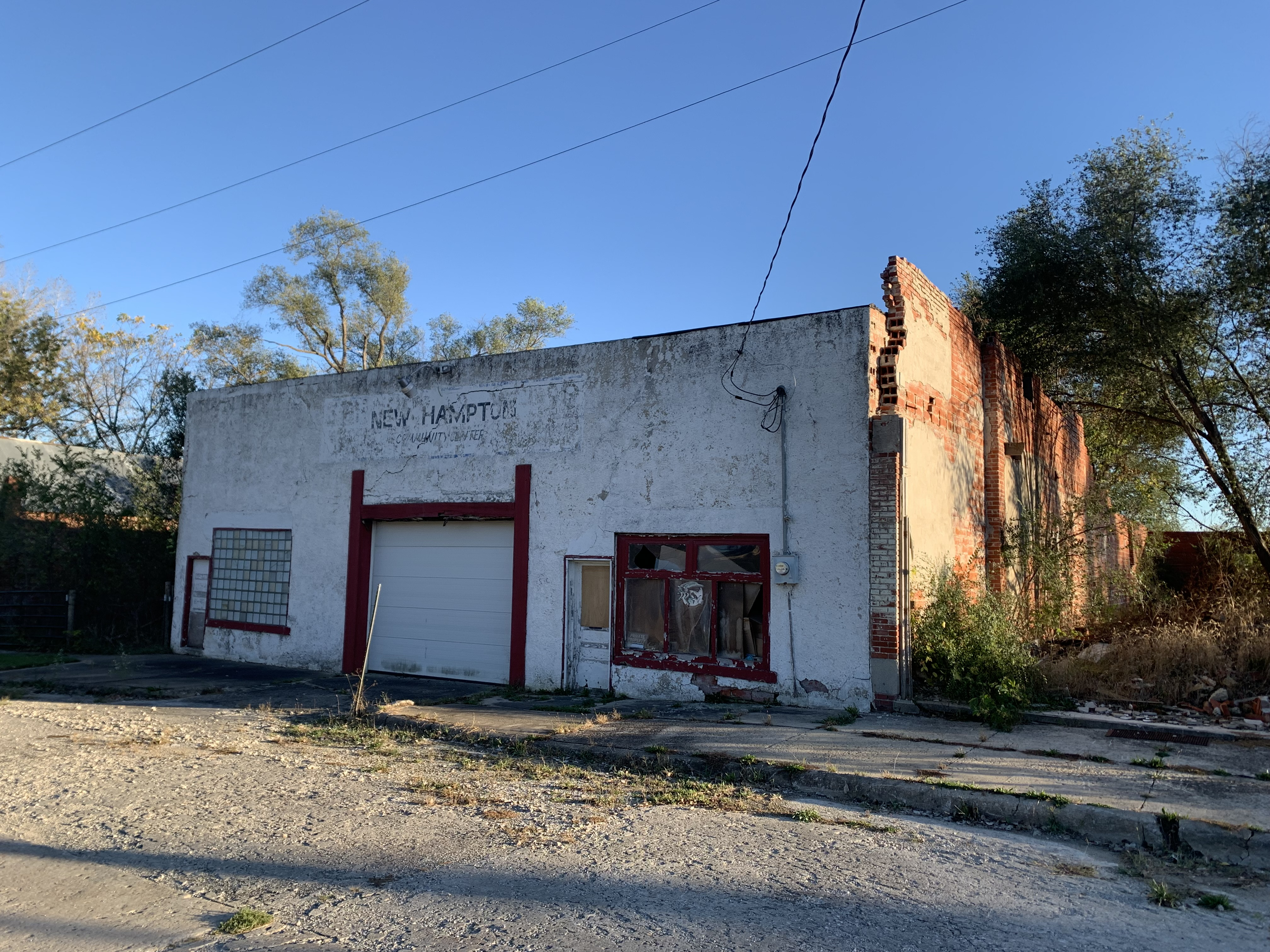
Dilapidated former community center in New Hampton

New Hampton was originally called Hamptonville, and under the latter name was platted in 1869 by Hampton Cox, and named for him. A post office called New Hampton has been in operation since 1881.

== Geography ==
According to the United States Census Bureau, the city has a total area of 0.55 square miles (1.42 km^{2}), all land.

== Demographics ==
Historical population
Census	Pop.	Note	%±
1890	184		—
1900	261		41.8%
1910	456		74.7%
1920	519		13.8%
1930	449		−13.5%
1940	412		−8.2%
1950	375		−9.0%
1960	289		−22.9%
1970	327		13.1%
1980	358		9.5%
1990	320		−10.6%
2000	349		9.1%
2010	291		−16.6%
2020	228		−21.6%
U.S. Decennial Census

=== 2010 census ===
At the 2010 census there were 291 people in 123 households, including 80 families, in the city. The population density was 529.1 inhabitants per square mile (204.3/km^{2}). There were 153 housing units at an average density of 278.2 per square mile (107.4/km^{2}). The racial makup of the city was 95.5% White, 1.7% Native American, and 2.7% from two or more races. Hispanic or Latino of any race were 0.3%.

Of the 123 households, 28.5% had children under the age of 18 living with them, 43.9% were married couples living together, 11.4% had a female householder with no husband present, 9.8% had a male householder with no wife present, and 35.0% were non-families. 30.9% of households were one person, and 20.3% were one person aged 65 or older. The average household size was 2.37 and the average family size was 2.90.

The median age was 38.1 years. 24.4% of residents were under the age of 18; 11.2% were between the ages of 18 and 24; 20.6% were from 25 to 44; 25.8% were from 45 to 64; and 17.9% were 65 or older. The gender makeup of the city was 49.1% male and 50.9% female.

=== 2000 census ===
At the 2000 census there were 349 people in 142 households, including 92 families, in the city. The population density was 501.3 inhabitants per square mile (193.6/km^{2}). There were 170 housing units at an average density of 244.2 per square mile (94.3/km^{2}). The racial makup of the city was 100.00% White. Hispanic or Latino of any race were 1.72%.

Of the 142 households, 26.1% had children under the age of 18 living with them, 54.9% were married couples living together, 6.3% had a female householder with no husband present, and 35.2% were non-families. 31.0% of households were one person, and 16.9% were one person aged 65 or older. The average household size was 2.46 and the average family size was 3.12.

In the city the population was spread out, with 26.4% under the age of 18, 8.0% from 18 to 24, 25.8% from 25 to 44, 19.8% from 45 to 64, and 20.1% 65 or older. The median age was 40 years. For every 100 females, there were 89.7 males. For every 100 females age 18 and over, there were 93.2 males.

The median household income was $32,917 and the median family income was $40,536. Males had a median income of $23,125 versus $16,136 for females. The per capita income for the city was $13,450. About 4.4% of families and 10.9% of the population were below the poverty line, including 11.2% of those under age 18 and 2.9% of those age 65 or over.

== Notable person ==
- Jesse N. Funk, Medal of Honor, World War I
