= Charles D. Barger =

United States Army Medal of Honor recipient

Charles Denver Barger
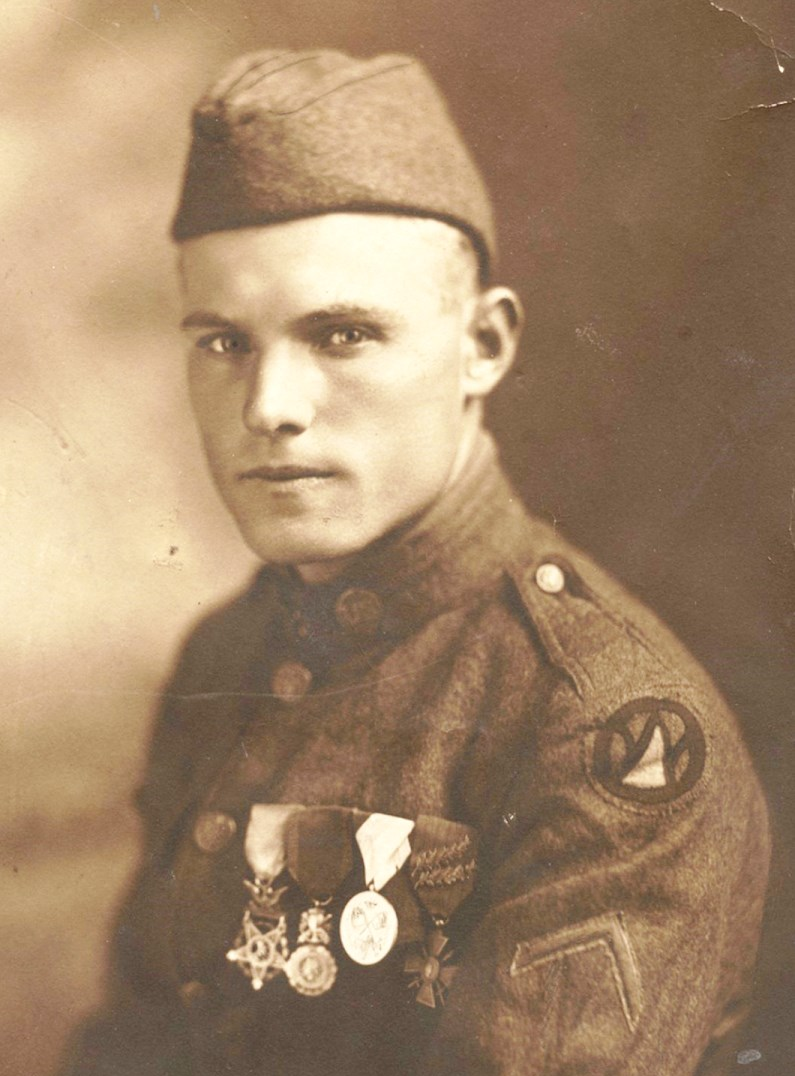
- Barger in 1919
- Born: June 3, 1892; Mount Vernon, Missouri, U.S.
- Died: November 25, 1936 (aged 44); Oak Grove, Missouri, U.S.
- Burial place: Blue Springs Cemetery
- Military career
- Allegiance: United States of America
- Branch: United States Army
- Service years: 1918–1919
- Rank: Private First Class
- Service number: 2205271
- Units: 354th Infantry Regiment, 89th Division
- Conflicts: World War I; Battle of Saint-Mihiel; Meuse–Argonne offensive Defensive Sector
- Awards: Medal of Honor; Purple Heart w/one silver and four bronze oak leaf clusters (10 total awards); World War I Victory Medal w/St. Mihiel, Meuse-Argonne and Defensive Sector Clasps; Army of Occupation of Germany Medal; Military Medal, Great Britain; Médaille Militaire, France; Croix de Guerre, w/ three bronze palms and one bronze star, 1914-1918, France; Order of Leopold, degree of Knight, Belgium, WWI; Croix de guerre w/bronze palm, Belgium, WWI; Croce al Merito di Guerra, Italy, WWI; Medal of Military Bravery, Montenegro, WWI; War with Germany Medal, WWI, Missouri; Expert Rifleman Badge, National Army, WWI

Charles Denver Barger (June 3, 1892 – November 25, 1936) was a United States Army soldier and a recipient of the United States military's highest decoration, the Medal of Honor, for his actions in World War I. He earned the medal while serving as a Chauchat automatic rifle gunner during the Meuse–Argonne offensive, when he and another soldier, Jesse N. Funk, entered no man's land despite heavy fire and rescued two wounded officers and one enlisted man.

== Early life ==
Barger was born in Mount Vernon, Missouri to George and Cora (Lake) Staffelbach. In 1897, his father, a member of the notorious Staffelbach gang from Galena, Kansas, was sentenced to life in prison for murder, and his mother gave him up for adoption. He did not see her again until after World War I. He was taken in by Sidney and Phoebe (Owens) Barger, who eventually adopted him, and he grew up in Stotts City, working as a farmhand.

== Military service ==
On April 1, 1918, Barger enlisted in the United States Army in Mt. Vernon and received his basic military training with the 23rd Company, 164th Depot Brigade, at Camp Funston, Kansas. Upon completion of accession training on April 24, he was assigned to Company L, 354th Infantry Regiment, 89th Division., which absorbed most of the men from southeastern and eastern Missouri. This regiment arrived in France in June 1918, and two months later Barger earned promotion to private first class. Having earned the Expert Rifleman Badge during training, he was selected as an automatic rifle gunner upon reaching France.

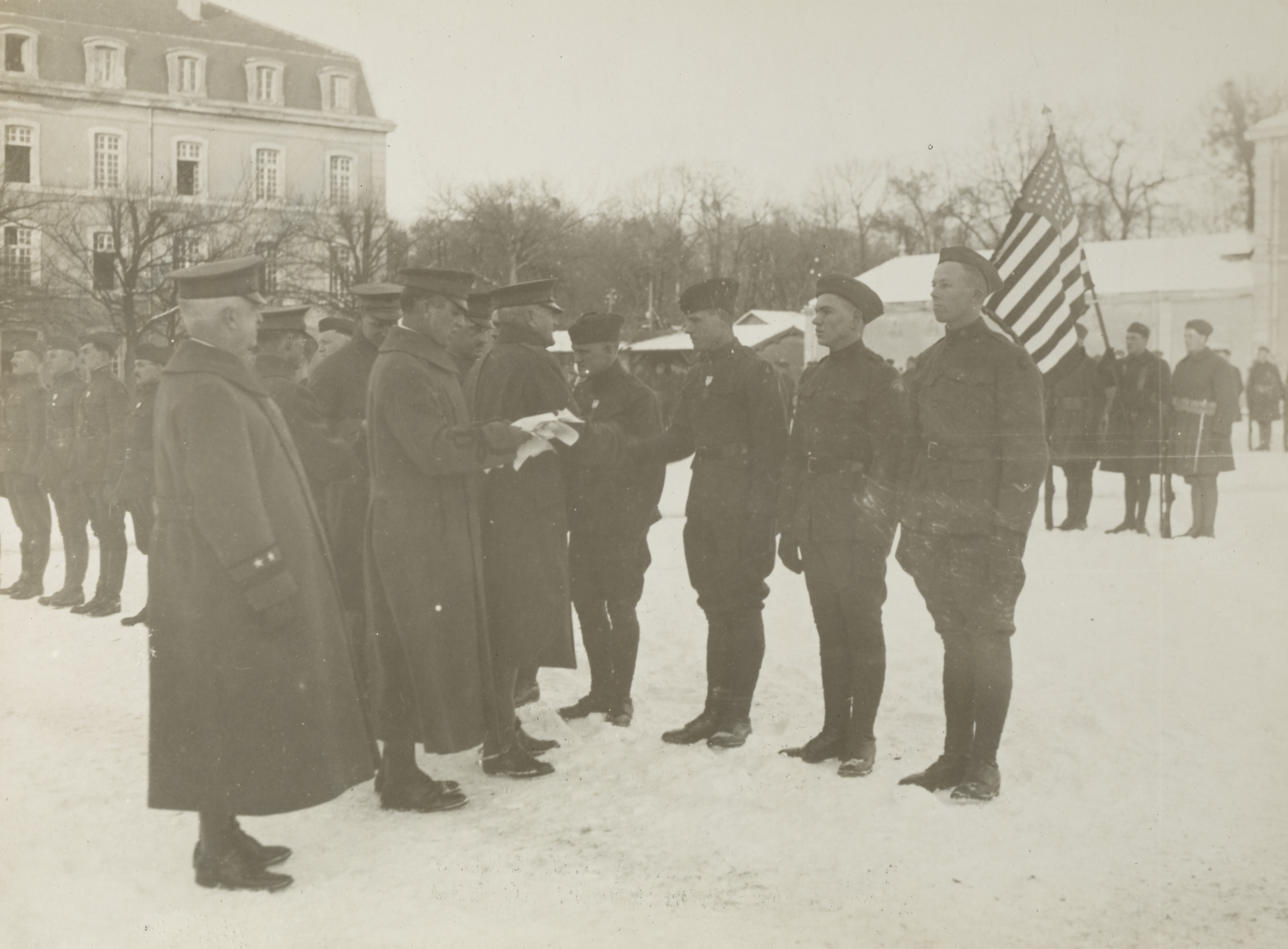
General John J. Pershing presenting the Medal of Honor to Private First Class Charles D. Barger, of Company I, 354th Infantry, 89th Division, outside Pershing's headquarters at Chaumont, France, February 1919.

Barger served in the St. Mihiel Offensive, but it was during the Meuse-Argonne Offensive that he really proved his mettle. The 177th Brigade, to which he was assigned, was situated on the southwest edge of Bois-de-Bantheville, France, during the last couple of weeks of October 1918. For more than a week, the enemy fired high-explosive shells, often containing mustard gas, and gas fumes lingered for days. No one escaped the effects, although some suffered more than others and required medical treatment or evacuation. Barger never reported for medical treatment, so was not allotted a wound chevron for his affliction.

On October 31, 1918, near Bois-de-Bantheville, Barger's regiment sent several patrols into no man's land to reconnoiter German positions in preparation for an advance as part of the Meuse-Argonne Offensive. Unusually, the patrols had been sent out during daylight, rather than waiting for the cover of darkness. Two patrols from Barger's regiment became pinned down by heavy rifle and machine gun fire. Second Lieutenant John M. Millis, of Company L, was seriously wounded in the legs and ordered his men to leave without him. One man managed to crawl to the safety of the Allied lines and brought news that Millis and another wounded officer were trapped in no man's land.

Upon hearing this, Barger and Private First Class Jesse N. Funk, voluntarily ran 500 yards (460 m) through heavy machine gun fire with a stretcher to rescue Millis, but he insisted that First Lieutenant Ernest G. Rowell, of Company I, be rescued first. When they returned to no man's land to rescue Millis, they discovered a wounded enlisted man about fifty yards from a machine gun nest, so they returned a third time to rescue him. For these actions, General John J. Pershing presented Barger and Funk the Medal of Honor in February 1919 in Trier, Germany.

"Then there was Charlie Barger," Funk revealed after the war. "He came from down at Stotts City, Missouri, and he'd never had much of a chance in life. He was an automatic Chauchat gunner; I was his carrier, and I used to write his letters for him and I got to know him pretty well. He was scared, too—just as badly scared as any of us, but he had the grit to put it all behind him, and what was more, he'd force it down so far that he could cheer up the other fellows. Believe me, he sure had grit and I'm proud to have been the running mate of a man that had as much fight in him as he had." In total, Barger was awarded the Purple Heart ten times for wounds he sustained.

== Later years and death ==
Barger returned to farming with his adopted uncle, Henry McFerron, and later as a construction worker in Waco, Missouri, but had a rough time making ends meet. He had difficulty adjusting to civilian life and struggled to stay employed. He was a member of the American Legion, and fellow veterans from that group helped him find work until "the general public and those who could give employment to veterans became apathetic to the appeals for help on the ground[s that] he was a national hero".

On January 1, 1921, Congress approved the recruiting of new soldiers, and he enlisted in Joplin on the tenth. He was assigned as a machine gunner to Company D, 38th Infantry Regiment, 3rd Division, at Camp Pike, Arkansas, until being permanently discharged from the Army on July 15, 1921.

While stationed in Arkansas, Barger married Audrey E. Hurst in Hardy, Arkansas, on March 2, 1921, and on June 6, 1922, they had a son named Charles Denver Barger Jr. This marriage was short-lived, and he went on to marry Ruth Irene Bailey. They had two children, Joseph Elmer Barger, born on January 25, 1925, and Mabel Louise "Dodi" Barger, born on April 13, 1928.

In January 1922, Barger was hired as a police officer in Kansas City. On February 22, he and Officer Howard Pollard were dispatched to 1724 Holly Street where two men were involved in bootlegging and one was suspected of murder. The suspects holed up on the second floor of the residence and decided to shoot it out with the officers. Pollard was hit in the arm and went down, and Barger was shot in the left wrist, right arm, chest and head—a total of five times. Nonetheless, he returned fire, shooting one man in the abdomen and hitting the other three times. While the latter fled, the man hit in the abdomen was taken into custody and died from his injury a short while later.

Barger recovered from his injuries, but his head wound coupled with the effects of mustard gas and post-traumatic stress eventually took its toll on his physical and mental health. He remained with the police force for twelve years before they let him go with no compensation or pension.

For the next few years Barger did whatever he could to make ends meet, but every day was a struggle. He raised rabbits to put meat on the table, planted a garden, and, against everything he believed in, accepted charity from the American Legion and Veterans of Foreign Wars, the only two agencies that stood by him through the years. "It's fine to have all the medals," he lamented, "but the trouble is you can't eat them."

In the spring of 1936, Barger moved to a farm four miles southwest of Oak Grove, outside of Kansas City, and began working for the Civilian Conservation Corps in Blue Springs.

On the night of November 23, the Jackson County Sheriff's Office were called to his home where they found him wielding a large hunting knife and setting fire to his farmhouse. He had three self-inflicted wounds to his throat, and the deputies reported that "his clothing was torn and his body burned in a dozen places." When the officers attempted to arrest him for threatening to kill his wife, he lunged at them with the knife. Deputy Frank Ridenour fired in self-defense, inflicting a non-life-threatening wound to Barger's right thigh. He was taken to the Kansas City General Hospital and died two days later from third-degree burns to his face and arms. He was buried at Blue Springs Cemetery in Blue Springs, not far from his Oak Grove home.

"That the breakdown was due to his war experience no comrade of Charles Barger would deny," a reporter friend wrote after his death. "Yet through the years every effort made by the veterans' organizations to persuade the government that sent him to war to admit responsibility for his mental condition ended in failure. There was no 'proof' in cold language that his suffering was connected with his service. Charles Barger remained a name and a case number."

== Medal of Honor citation ==
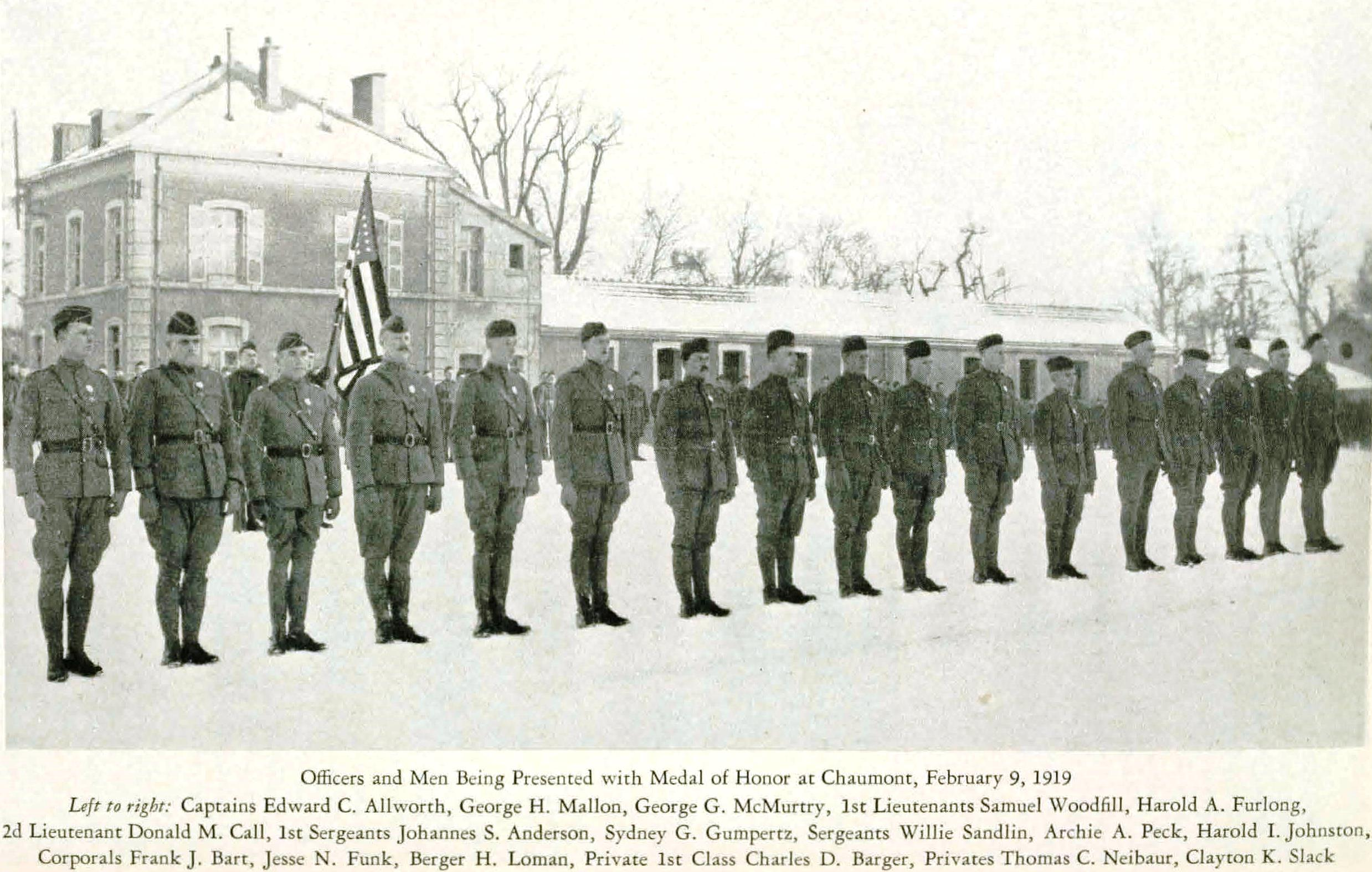
Medal of Honor Presentation Ceremony - February 9, 1919, at Chaumont, France. General John J. Pershing presided.

Rank and organization: Private First Class, U.S. Army, Company L, 354th Infantry, 89th Division. Place and date: Near Bois-deBantheville, France, 31 October 1918. Entered service at: Stotts City, Mo. Birth: Mount Vernon, Mo. General Orders: War Department, General Orders No. 20 (January 30, 1919).

Citation:

Learning that 2 daylight patrols had been caught out in No Man's Land and were unable to return, Pfc. Barger and another stretcher bearer upon their own initiative made 2 trips 500 yards beyond our lines, under constant machinegun fire, and rescued 2 wounded officers.

== Military awards ==
Barger's military decorations and awards include:

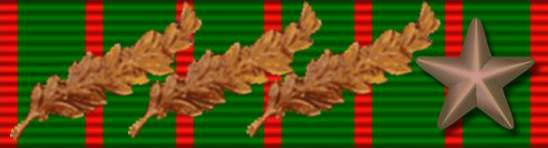

1st row	Medal of Honor	Purple Heart w/ one silver and four bronze oak leaf clusters	
2nd row	World War I Victory Medal w/ three bronze service stars (to denote credit for the St. Mihiel, Meuse-Argonne and Defensive Sector battle clasps)	Army of Occupation of Germany Medal	Military Medal (Great Britain)
3rd row	Médaille militaire (French Republic)	Croix de guerre 1914–1918 w/three bronze palms and one bronze star (French Republic)	Order of Leopold degree of Knight (Belgium)
4th row	Croix de guerre w/ bronze palm (Belgium)	Croce al Merito di Guerra (Italy)	Medal for Military Bravery (Kingdom of Montenegro)

== See also ==
- List of Medal of Honor recipients for World War I
