= Arthur J. Forrest =

United States Army Medal of Honor recipient

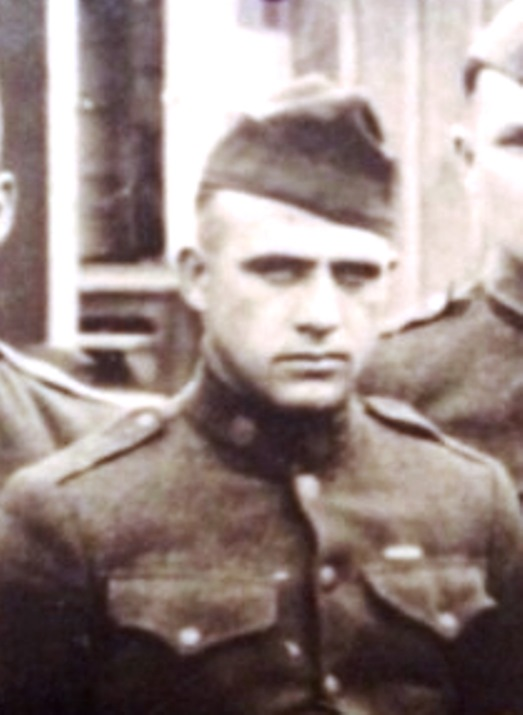
- Medal of Honor recipient
- Born: May 1, 1895; St. Louis, Missouri
- Died: November 30, 1964 (aged 69); St. Louis, Missouri
- Burial place: Grand View Burial Park Ralls, Missouri
- Military career
- Allegiance: United States of America
- Branch: United States Army
- Rank: Sergeant
- Service number: 2178726
- Units: Company D, 354th Infantry, 89th Division
- Conflicts: World War I
- Awards: Medal of Honor

Arthur Joseph Forrest (May 1, 1895—November 30, 1964) was an American soldier serving in the U.S. Army during World War I who received the Medal of Honor for heroism above and beyond the call of duty.

== Biography ==
Arthur J. Forrest was born in 1896 in St. Louis, Missouri, to William Edward Forrest and Mary E. Forrest (née O'Fallon), and prior to World War I he was a professional baseball player, having been with Hannibal, MO, and Quincy, IL, of the Three-I League. He enlisted in the United States Army in 1918 and was sent to France to fight in World War I, therein serving in Company D, 354th Infantry Regiment, 89th Division. Upon returning to the United States in May 1919, he was discharged the following month and returned to Hannibal, Missouri. In 1920, Forrest moved to Laramie, Wyoming, where he was captain and catcher for the Midwest Refining Company baseball team. By the end of the decade, Forrest moved to Winston-Salem, North Carolina, where he played as catcher for the Winston-Salem club of the Piedmont League. Upon retiring from baseball, Forrest returned to Missouri and became a contact representative at the Veterans Administration office in St. Louis. He died on November 30, 1964, while riding a bus to work, and was buried at Grand View Burial Park, Hannibal, Missouri.

== Medal of Honor citation ==
Rank and organization: Sergeant, U.S. Army, Company D, 354th Infantry, 89th Division. Place and date: At Remonville, France, 1 November 1918. Entered service at: Hannibal, Missouri. Birth: St. Louis, Missouri. General Orders: War Department, General Orders No. 50 (April 12, 1919).

Citation:

When the advance of his company was stopped by bursts of fire from a nest of six enemy machineguns, without being discovered, Sergeant Forrest worked his way single-handed to a point within 50 yards of the machinegun nest. Charging, single-handed, he drove out the enemy in disorder, thereby protecting the advance platoon from annihilating fire, and permitting the resumption of the advance of his company.

== Military awards ==
Forrest's military decorations and awards include the following:

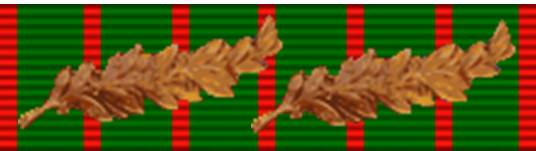

1st row	Medal of Honor		
2nd row	World War I Victory Medal w/ three bronze service stars to denote credit for the St. Mihiel, Meuse-Argonne and Defensive Sector battle clasps	Army of Occupation of Germany Medal	Médaille militaire (French Republic
3rd row	Croix de guerre 1914–1918 w/ two bronze palms (French Republic)	Croce al Merito di Guerra (Italy)	Medal for Military Bravery (Kingdom of Montenegro)

== See also ==
- List of Medal of Honor recipients for World War I
