= Arthur Forrest (rugby union) =

Irish rugby union player

- Full name: Arthur James Forrest
- Born: 13 October 1859 Dublin, Ireland
- Died: 13 July 1936 (aged 76) Thorp Arch, Yorkshire, England
- School: Cheltenham College

Rugby union career
- Position: Forward
International career
Years	Team	Apps	(Points)
1880–85	Ireland	8	(0)

Arthur James Forrest (13 October 1859 — 13 July 1936) was an Irish international rugby union player.

Born in Dublin, Forrest was educated at England's Cheltenham College, where was head boy. He was rugby captain of the Cheltenham College first XV and also captained the college's cricket XI. On his return home, Forrest played for the Dublin Wanderers club and was capped eight times as a forward for Ireland from 1880 and 1885, which included periods as captain. He also captained Yorkshire for two seasons.

Forrest managed the estates of the Duke of Bedfordshire and lived his later years in Thorp Arch, Yorkshire. He was made a Member of the Victorian Order for his contributions to forestry and served on the Wetherby Rural Council.

== See also ==
- List of Ireland national rugby union players
