= 451st Expeditionary Sustainment Command =

451st Expeditionary Sustainment Command (ESC)
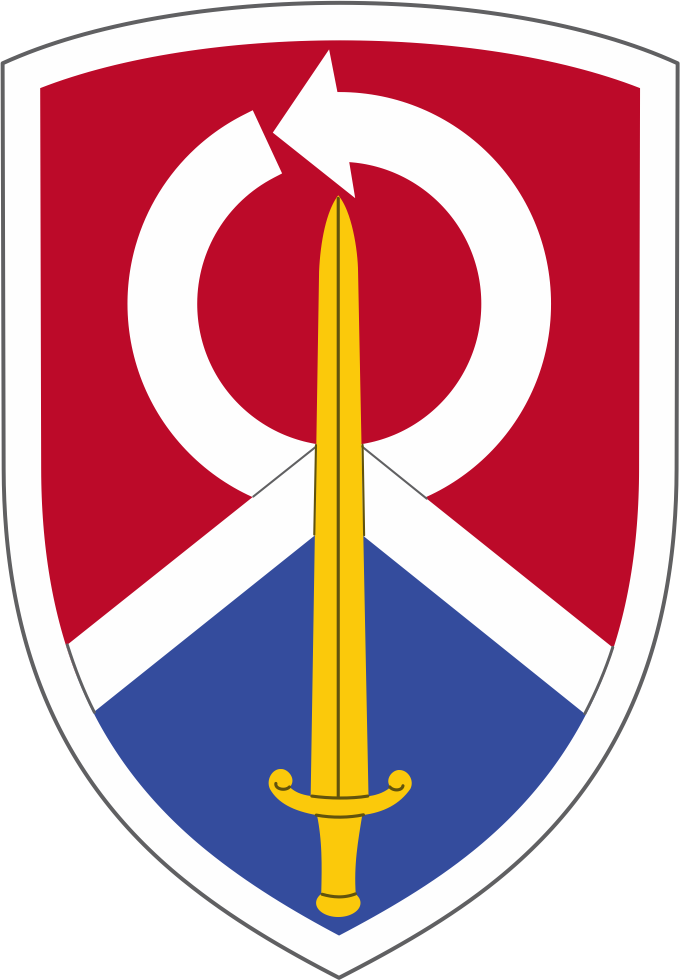
- Shoulder Sleeve Insignia
- Active: September 2011 - Present
- Country: United States
- Branch: United States Army Reserve
- Type: Sustainment Command (Expeditionary)
- Part of: 79th Sustainment Support Command
- Reserve Center: 1LT Lanny J. Wallace Army Reserve Center Wichita, Kansas
- Motto: Sustain with Excellence

Commanders
- Commanding Officer: BG Brandi Peasley
- Command Sergeant Major: CSM Annette Brandenburg-Bethany

Insignia
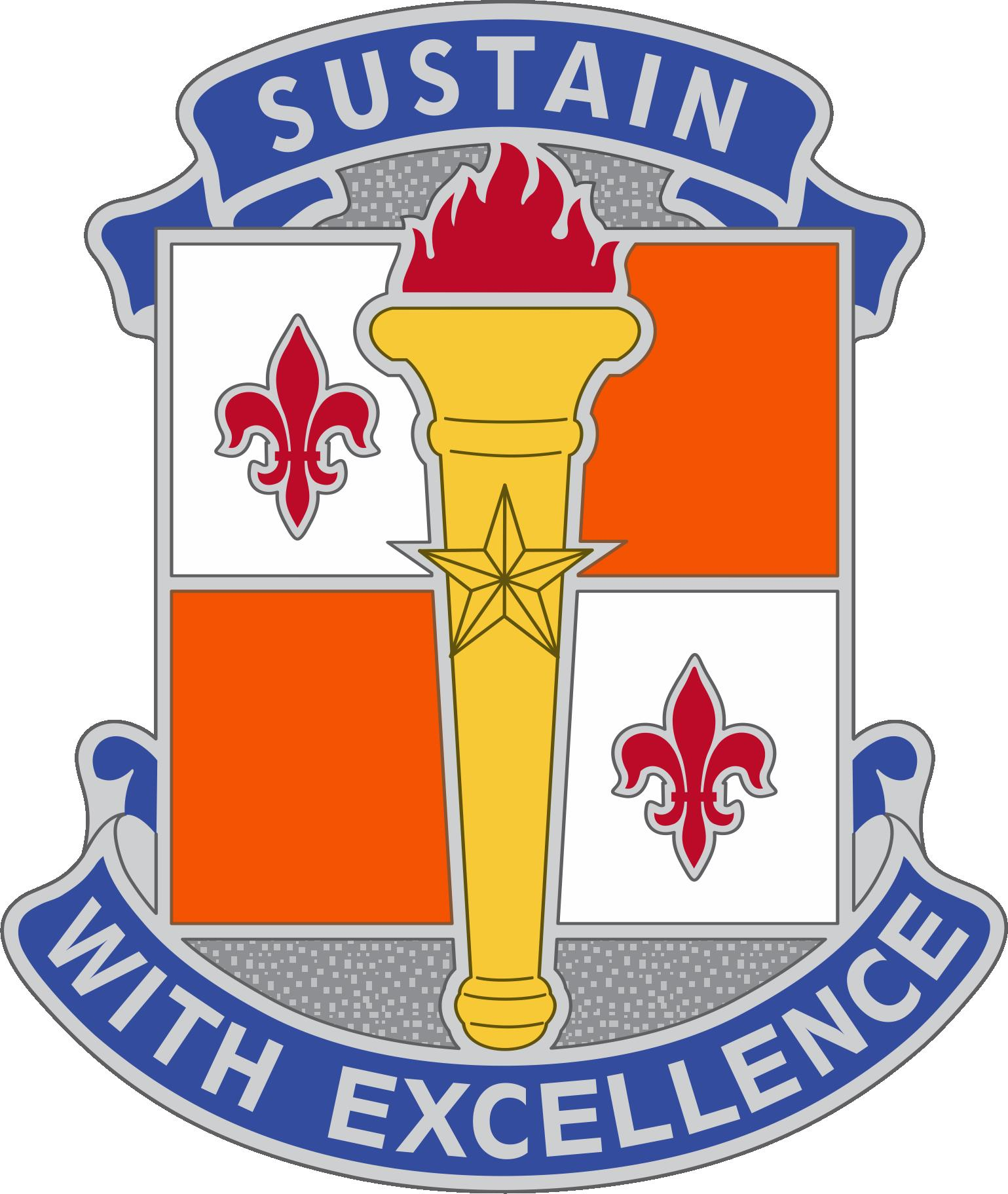
- 451st Sustainment Command DUI

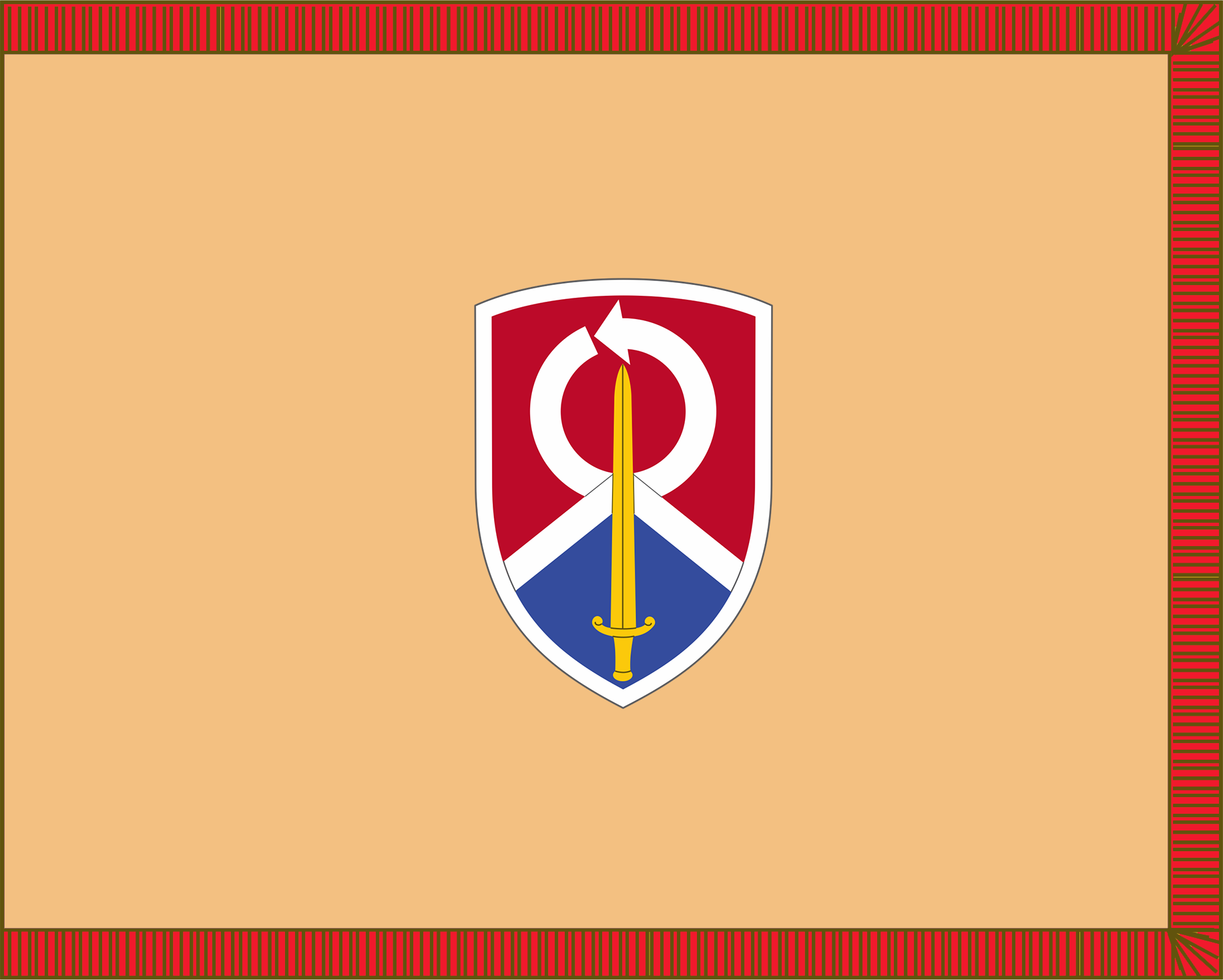
- 451st Sustainment Command Flag

The 451st Expeditionary Sustainment Command (451 ESC) is a subordinate command of 79th Sustainment Support Command.

== History ==
The Army Reserve officially placed the 451st ESC in a two-year "carrier status" to allow the Army Reserve the necessary time to recruit soldiers, equip the unit and begin training to meet its activation date. Located in Wichita, Kansas the 451st ESC activated on 16 September 2011, becoming the newest ESC in the Army Reserve. In October 2012, the 451st took command and control of multiple Army Reserve units throughout the Midwest. The unit deployed to the CENTCOM area of responsibility in support of contingency operations in 2016.

== Organization ==
The command is a subordinate unit of the 79th Theater Sustainment Command. As of January 2026 the command consists of the following units:

- 451st Expeditionary Sustainment Command, in Wichita (KS)
  - Headquarters and Headquarters Company, 451st Expeditionary Sustainment Command, in Wichita (KS)
  - 89th Sustainment Brigade, in Kansas City (MO)
    - 89th Special Troops Battalion, in Kansas City (MO)
      - Headquarters and Headquarters Company, 89th Sustainment Brigade, in Kansas City (MO)
    - 329th Combat Sustainment Support Battalion, in Parsons (KS)
      - Headquarters and Headquarters Company, 329th Combat Sustainment Support Battalion, in Parsons (KS)
      - 387th Human Resources Company, in Wichita (KS)
        - 1st Platoon, 387th Human Resources Company, in Bethany (MO)
        - 5th Platoon (Postal), 387th Human Resources Company, in Bethany (MO)
      - 1011th Quartermaster Company (Supply), in Independence (KS)
        - Detachment 1, 1011th Quartermaster Company (Supply), in Beatrice (NE)
      - 368th Financial Management Support Unit, in Wichita (KS)
        - Detachment 2, 368th Financial Management Support Unit, in Lawrence (KS)
    - 484th Transportation Battalion (Movement Control), in Springfield (MO)
      - Headquarters and Headquarters Detachment, 484th Transportation Battalion (Movement Control), in Springfield (MO)
      - 428th Transportation Medium Truck Company (Cargo) (EAB Linehaul), in Jefferson City (MO)
        - Detachment 1, 428th Transportation Medium Truck Company (Cargo) (EAB Linehaul), in Springfield (MO)
      - 473rd Transportation Detachment (Movement Control Team), in Kansas City (MO)
      - 557th Transportation Detachment (Movement Control Team), in Springfield (MO)
      - 560th Transportation Detachment (Movement Control Team), in Springfield (MO)
      - 561st Transportation Detachment (Movement Control Team), in Springfield (MO)
      - 842nd Quartermaster Company (Petroleum Support), in Tonganoxie (KS)
    - 620th Combat Sustainment Support Battalion, in St. Louis (MO)
      - Headquarters and Headquarters Company, 620th Combat Sustainment Support Battalion, in St. Louis (MO)
      - 245th Ordnance Company (Support Maintenance), in St. Charles (MO)
        - 1st Platoon, 245th Ordnance Company (Support Maintenance), in Farmington (MO)
        - 2nd Platoon, 245th Ordnance Company (Support Maintenance), in Washington (MO)
      - 383rd Quartermaster Company (Petroleum Support), in Saint Charles (MO)
      - 824th Quartermaster Detachment (Petroleum Liaison Team), in Lawrence (KS)
      - 863rd Quartermaster Detachment (Petroleum Liaison Team), in Great Bend (KS)
  - 561st Regional Support Group, in Elkhorn (NE)
    - Headquarters and Headquarters Company, 561st Regional Support Group, in Elkhorn (NE)
    - 394th Combat Sustainment Support Battalion, in Fremont (NE)
      - Headquarters and Headquarters Company, 394th Combat Sustainment Support Battalion, in Fremont (NE)
      - 295th Ordnance Company (Ammo) (Modular), in Hastings (NE)
        - 1st Platoon, 295th Ordnance Company (Ammo) (Modular), in Kearney (NE)
        - 2nd Platoon, 295th Ordnance Company (Ammo) (Modular), in Lincoln (NE)
        - 3rd Platoon, 295th Ordnance Company (Ammo) (Modular), in St. Joseph (MO)
      - 452nd Ordnance Company (Ammo) (Modular), in Aberdeen (SD)
        - 2nd Platoon, 452nd Ordnance Company (Ammo) (Modular), in Grand Forks (ND)
      - 456th Transportation Detachment (Movement Control Team), in Elkhorn (NE)
      - 728th Quartermaster Company (Petroleum Pipeline and Terminal Operation), in Fremont (NE)
        - Detachment 1, 728th Quartermaster Company (Petroleum Pipeline and Terminal Operation), in Norfolk (NE)
      - 903rd Transportation Company (Inland Cargo Transfer Company — ICTC), in Sioux Falls (SD)
        - Detachment 1, 903rd Transportation Company (Inland Cargo Transfer Company — ICTC), in Sioux City (IA)
      - 922nd Transportation Detachment (Trailer Transfer Point Team), in Fremont (NE)
      - 1013th Quartermaster Company (Field Service) (Modular), in North Platte (NE)
        - 2nd Platoon, 1013th Quartermaster Company (Field Service) (Modular), in McCook (NE)
    - 450th Transportation Battalion (Movement Control), in Manhattan (KS)
      - Headquarters and Headquarters Detachment, 450th Transportation Battalion (Movement Control), in Manhattan (KS)
      - 77th Transportation Detachment (Movement Control Team), in Manhattan (KS)
      - 339th Transportation Detachment (Movement Control Team), in Manhattan (KS)
      - 378th Transportation Detachment (Movement Control Team), in Manhattan (KS)
      - 443rd Transportation Company (Combat HET), in Elkhorn (NE)
        - Detachment 1, 443rd Transportation Company (Combat HET), in Lincoln (NE)
      - 531st Transportation Detachment (Movement Control Team), in Manhattan (KS)
      - 535th Transportation Detachment (Movement Control Team), in Manhattan (KS)
      - 538th Transportation Detachment (Movement Control Team), in Manhattan (KS)
      - 607th Transportation Detachment (Movement Control Team), in Manhattan (KS)
      - 625th Transportation Detachment (Movement Control Team), in Manhattan (KS)
    - 821st Transportation Battalion (Motor), in Topeka (KS)
      - Headquarters and Headquarters Detachment, 821st Transportation Battalion (Motor), in Topeka (KS)
      - 129th Transportation Company (Combat HET), at New Century AirCenter (KS)
        - Detachment 1, 129th Transportation Company (Combat HET), in Osage City (KS)
        - Detachment 2, 129th Transportation Company (Combat HET), in Great Bend (KS)
        - Detachment 3, 129th Transportation Company (Combat HET), in Dodge City (KS)
      - 423rd Transportation Medium Truck Company (PLS) (EAB Tactical), in Colorado Springs (CO)
      - 425th Transportation Medium Truck Company (POL, 7.5K GAL) (EAB Linehaul), in Salina (KS)
        - Detachment 1, 425th Transportation Medium Truck Company (POL, 7.5K GAL) (EAB Linehaul), in Emporia (KS)

Abbreviations: PLS — Palletized Load System; HET — Heavy Equipment Transporter; POL — Petroleum Oil Lubricants; EAB — Echelon Above Brigade
