= Pouilly-sur-Meuse =

- Commune
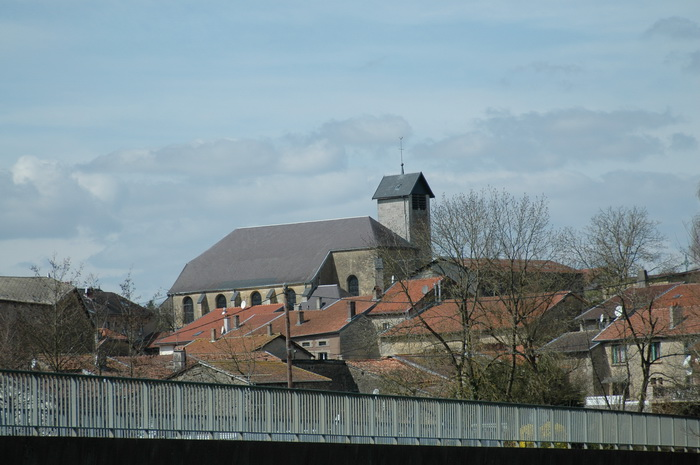
- The church and surroundings in Pouilly-sur-Meuse

- Coat of arms
- Location of Pouilly-sur-Meuse
- Location within France Location within Grand Est
- Coordinates: 49°32′27″N 5°06′34″E
- Country: France
- Region: Grand Est
- Department: Meuse
- Arrondissement: Verdun
- Canton: Stenay

Government
  - Mayor (2020–2026): Dominique Tramecourt
- Area^{1}: 11.83 km^{2} (4.57 sq mi)
- Elevation: 162 m (531 ft)
- Highest elevation: 276 m (906 ft)
- Lowest elevation: 158 m (518 ft)
- Population (2023): 171
  - Density: 14.5/km^{2} (37.4/sq mi)
- Time zone: UTC+01:00 (CET)
  - Summer (DST): UTC+02:00 (CEST)
- INSEE/Postal code: 55408 /55700
- ^{1} French Land Register data, which excludes lakes, ponds, glaciers > 1 km^{2} (0.386 sq mi or 247 acres) and river estuaries.

Pouilly-sur-Meuse (French pronunciation: [puji syʁ møz], literally Pouilly on Meuse) is a commune in the Meuse department in Grand Est in north-eastern France.

== See also ==
- Communes of the Meuse department
